= List of lakes of the Philippines =

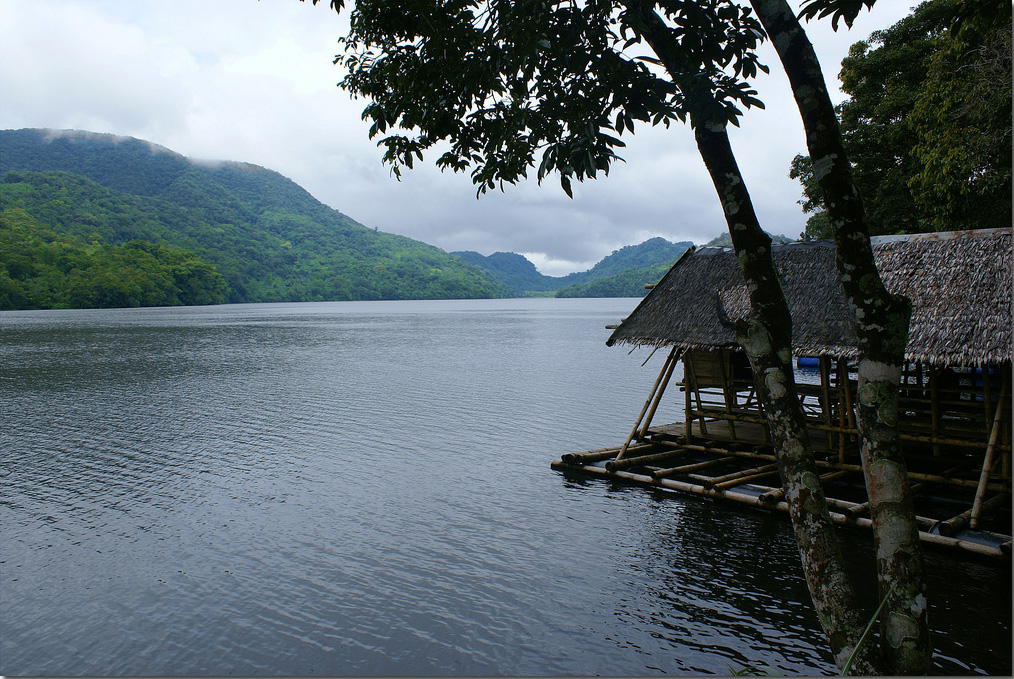
Several lakes in the Philippines, like Lake Danao in Leyte (pictured), are volcanic in origin.

The origin of many lakes in the Philippines is closely related to volcanic and tectonic activity. A number of smaller lakes occupy the craters of extinct volcanoes. Some lake basins are developed by subsidence due to tectonic or volcanic activity. Others owe their existence to obstruction of drainage courses by landslides, lava flows and by fragmental volcanic ejecta.

Among the lakes in the Philippines, three stand out because of their size or economic importance: Laguna de Bay and Taal Lake in Luzon, and Lake Lanao in Mindanao.

== List ==
The following is a partial list of permanent lakes (excluding flood plains) in the Philippines:

Lake	Type	Area	Surface elevation (m.a.s.l.)	Province	Region	Coordinates	Notes
Alligator	crater lake	23 ha (57 acres)	2 m (6 ft 7 in)	Laguna	IV-A	14°10′57″N 121°12′23″E	Also known as Lake Tadlac, it is located along the shore of Laguna de Bay in Brgy. Tadlac, Los Baños.
Ambuklao	reservoir	383 ha (950 acres)	761 m (2,497 ft)	Benguet	CAR	16°28′25″N 120°44′50″E	Created with the damming of Agno River
Apo	crater lake	24 ha (59 acres)	640 m (2,100 ft)	Bukidnon	X	7°52′45″N 125°0′21″E	Located in west of the city of Valencia
Baao		177 ha (440 acres)	5 m (16 ft)	Camarines Sur	V	13°27′56″N 123°18′53″E	
Bababu	tectonic lake	5 ha (12 acres)	45 m (148 ft)	Dinagat Islands	XIII	10°4′28″N 125°30′33″E	
Balanan	landslide lake	25 ha (62 acres)	237 m (778 ft)	Negros Oriental	XVIII	9°8′16″N 122°59′55″E	Created after a landslide from the 1925 earthquake blocked the Balanan River
Balinsasayao	crater lake	76 ha (190 acres)	874 m (2,867 ft)	Negros Oriental	XVIII	9°21′11″N 123°10′45″E	Twin lake of Lake Danao (Negros)
Basak	tectonic lake	15 ha (37 acres)	589 m (1,932 ft)	Lanao del Sur	ARMM	8°2′7″N 124°15′32″E	Located in Saguiaran, Lanao del Sur
Bato		2,810 ha (6,900 acres)	10 m (33 ft)	Camarines Sur	V	13°19′57″N 123°21′36″E	
Bito	crater lake	140 ha (350 acres)	2 m (6 ft 7 in)	Leyte	VIII	10°47′19″N 124°58′49″E	
Buhi	landslide	1,707 ha (4,220 acres)	120 m (390 ft)	Camarines Sur	V	13°27′29″N 123°30′38″E	Formed after the non-volcanic earthquake of 1628 created a landslide which dammed the Barit River.
Buluan	tectonic lake	6,134 ha (15,160 acres)	9 m (30 ft)	Maguindanao del Sur & Sultan Kudarat	ARMM & XII	6°38′42″N 124°49′38″E	
Bulusan		28 ha (69 acres)	360 m (1,180 ft)	Sorsogon	V	12°45′16″N 124°5′37″E	
Bunot	crater lake	31 ha (77 acres)	153 m (502 ft)	Laguna	IV-A	14°4′53″N 121°20′38″E	One of the seven lakes of San Pablo City
Butig	tectonic lake	25 ha (62 acres)	762 m (2,500 ft)	Lanao del Sur	ARMM	7°44′2″N 124°17′27″E	
Cabalian	crater lake	15 ha (37 acres)	733 m (2,405 ft)	Leyte	VIII	10°16′47″N 125°12′56″E	
Calibato	crater lake	42 ha (100 acres)	184 m (604 ft)	Laguna	IV-A	14°6′12″N 121°22′41″E	One of the seven lakes of San Pablo City
Caliraya	reservoir	1,050 ha (2,600 acres)	300 m (980 ft)	Laguna	IV-A	14°17′34″N 121°31′3″E	Created with the damming of Caliraya River
Caluangan	tectonic lake	182 ha (450 acres)	1 m (3 ft 3 in)	Oriental Mindoro	IV-B	13°22′11″N 121°8′11″E	Also known as Baruyan Lake
Camannauan		3 ha (7.4 acres)	13 m (43 ft)	Cagayan	II	18°13′29″N 121°46′49″E	
Candelaria		48 ha (120 acres)	2 m (6 ft 7 in)	Zambales	III	15°36′38″N 119°56′34″E	
Capahayan	crater lake	22 ha (54 acres)	51 m (167 ft)	Surigao del Norte	XIII	9°32′25″N 125°34′47″E	Located in the town of Tubod
Catol	tectonic lake	19 ha (47 acres)	7 m (23 ft)	Zambales	III	15°37′17″N 119°56′26″E	Located in Brgy. Catol, the saltwater lake is one of the four lakes in Candelaria.
Dagianan	crater lake	3 ha (7.4 acres)	1,231 m (4,039 ft)	Lanao del Norte	X	7°52′54″N 124°1′36″E	
Dakula	tectonic lake	12 ha (30 acres)	10 m (33 ft)	Sulu	ARMM	5°41′55″N 120°49′13″E	
Danao	crater lake	18 ha (44 acres)	304 m (997 ft)	Albay	V	13°21′33″N 123°34′24″E	Located in Polangui, Albay
Danao	tectonic lake	680 ha (1,700 acres)	5 m (16 ft)	Cebu	VII	10°40′25″N 124°20′19″E	Largest lake in the Visayas
Danao	tectonic lake	148 ha (370 acres)	650 m (2,130 ft)	Leyte	VIII	11°4′23″N 124°41′33″E	Centerpiece of Lake Danao Natural Park
Danao	crater lake	28 ha (69 acres)	898 m (2,946 ft)	Negros Oriental	XVIII	9°21′2″N 123°11′0″E	Twin lake of Lake Balinsasayao
Danao	crater lake	4 ha (9.9 acres)	450 m (1,480 ft)	Sorsogon	V	13°4′25″N 123°58′42″E	Located in the Pocdol Mountains near Bacon, Sorsogon
Dapao	tectonic lake	1,012 ha (2,500 acres)	960 m (3,150 ft)	Lanao del Sur	ARMM	7°47′12″N 124°2′36″E	
Dasay		40 ha (99 acres)	230 m (750 ft)	Zamboanga del Sur	IX	7°39′43″N 123°15′11″E	
Duminagat	crater lake	9 ha (22 acres)	1,577 m (5,174 ft)	Misamis Occidental	X	8°18′25″N 123°36′57″E	Located inside Mount Malindang Range Natural Park
Ernestine	crater lake	35 ha (86 acres)	3 m (9.8 ft)	Tawi-Tawi	ARMM	6°58′25″N 118°29′46″E	One of the three adjacent crater lakes in Mapun, one is open to the sea so is technically not a lake.
Gunao	crater lake	23 ha (57 acres)	117 m (384 ft)	Quezon	IV-A	14°0′4″N 121°22′17″E	
Himbang	tectonic lake	26 ha (64 acres)	14 m (46 ft)	Agusan del Sur	XIII	8°28′4″N 125°46′12″E	
Kabalin-an	crater lake	2 ha (4.9 acres)	824 m (2,703 ft)	Negros Oriental	XVIII	9°21′55″N 123°10′46″E	Located on the same caldera as Lakes Balinsasayao and Danao
Kalanganan	tectonic lake	12 ha (30 acres)	512 m (1,680 ft)	Lanao del Norte	X	8°4′59″N 124°15′16″E	Located in Pantar
Kayangan				Palawan	XVII	11°57′26″N 120°13′34″E	Regarded as the cleanest lake in Asia
La Mesa	reservoir	463 ha (1,140 acres)	80 m (260 ft)	None (located within Quezon City)	NCR	14°43′1″N 121°4′46″E	Part of the Angat-Ipo-La Mesa water system, main source of water for Metro Manila
Laguna de Bay	tectonic lake	93,000 ha (230,000 acres)	2 m (6 ft 7 in)	Cavite, Laguna, Rizal & Quezon	IV-A&NCR	14°20′N 121°17′E	Part of the lake is Laguna Caldera
Lanao	tectonic lake	34,000 ha (84,000 acres)	700 m (2,300 ft)	Lanao del Sur	ARMM	7°51′N 124°15′E	
Lanao	tectonic lake	2 ha (4.9 acres)	5 m (16 ft)	Bohol	VII	9°52′47″N 123°45′51″E	Also spelled "Danao", and also known as Cabilao Island Lake. Located on Cabilao Island
Leonard	crater lake	70 ha (170 acres)	800 m (2,600 ft)	Davao del Norte	XI	7°23′37″N 126°3′32″E	Partially fills the 4 x 5 km Leonard Caldera
Libuao	crater lake	24 ha (59 acres)	800 m (2,600 ft)	Occidental Mindoro	IV-B	7°23′37″N 126°3′32″E	Named after the white lotus, Libua in Mangyan, that is abundant on the lake's surface
Looc	tectonic lake	113 ha (280 acres)	34 m (112 ft)	Zambales	III	14°54′3″N 120°9′56″E	
Lumao	tectonic lake	1,680 ha (4,200 acres)	17 m (56 ft)	Agusan del Sur	XIII	8°26′39″N 125°46′23″E	
Lumot	reservoir	582 ha (1,440 acres)	300 m (980 ft)	Laguna	IV-A	14°15′16″N 121°32′59″E	Formed by the construction of Lumot Dam, damming Lumot River
Mabilog	crater lake	2 ha (4.9 acres)	1,605 m (5,266 ft)	Negros Oriental	VII	9°15′4″N 123°10′30″E	One of the two crater lakes of Cuernos de Negros
Magat	reservoir	1,122 ha (2,770 acres)	192 m (630 ft)	Ifugao & Isabela	CAR & II	16°49′30″N 121°25′33″E	Created with the damming of Magat River
Mahokdum	crater lake	22 ha (54 acres)	190 m (620 ft)	Surigao del Norte	XIII	9°34′7″N 125°32′23″E	
Mainit	tectonic lake	17,340 ha (42,800 acres)	42 m (138 ft)	Surigao del Norte & Agusan del Norte	XIII	9°27′31″N 125°31′10″E	Second deepest lake in the country at 223 m (732 ft)
Malimanga	tectonic lake	12 ha (30 acres)	7 m (23 ft)	Zambales	III	15°38′41″N 119°56′8.5″E	Located in Brgy. Malimanga, Candelaria, the lake is a protected bird and fish sanctuary since 1980.
Manamlay	tectonic lake	11 ha (27 acres)	21 m (69 ft)	Occidental Mindoro	IV-B	12°59′7″N 120°51′23″E	Also known as Panikian Lake for the fruit bats that were abundant in the area.
Manguao	tectonic lake	741 ha (1,830 acres)	21 m (69 ft)	Palawan	IV-B	10°45′46″N 119°33′1″E	
Mapanuepe	lahar-dammed	648 ha (1,600 acres)	129 m (423 ft)	Zambales	III	14°58′55″N 120°17′40″E	Created when lahar from Mount Pinatubo dammed the confluence of Mapanuepe and Marella Rivers.
Maughan	crater lake	317 ha (780 acres)	1,338 m (4,390 ft)	South Cotabato	XII	6°6′5″N 124°53′20″E	Created with the eruption of Parker Volcano on January 4, 1641
Muhikap	crater lake	15 ha (37 acres)	80 m (260 ft)	Laguna	IV-A	14°7′20″N 121°20′3″E	One of the seven lakes of San Pablo City
Nag-aso Boiling	thermal lake	3 ha (7.4 acres)	35 m (115 ft)	Albay	V	13°7′27.8″N 123°54′28.10″E	Located in Brgy. Holugan, Manito, the hot spring that feed the lake with temperatures of about 100 °C (212 °F) is located in the NE corner of the lake.
Nailig	crater lake	11 ha (27 acres)	1,599 m (5,246 ft)	Negros Oriental	XVIII	9°14′52″N 123°10′23″E	One of the two crater lakes of Cuernos de Negros
Nalapan	tectonic lake	3 ha (7.4 acres)	515 m (1,690 ft)	Davao del Sur	XI	5°46′47″N 125°28′49″E	
Napalit	tectonic lake	36 ha (89 acres)	1,041 m (3,415 ft)	Bukidnon	X	7°52′5″N 124°47′3″E	
Naujan	tectonic lake	8,125 ha (20,080 acres)	20 m (66 ft)	Oriental Mindoro	IV-B	13°10′25″N 121°21′12″E	
Nunungan		153 ha (380 acres)	830 m (2,720 ft)	Lanao del Norte	X	7°49′21″N 123°57′19″E	
Palakpakin	crater lake	43 ha (110 acres)	136 m (446 ft)	Laguna	IV-A	14°6′37″N 121°20′24″E	One of the seven lakes of San Pablo City
Panamao	crater lake	68 ha (170 acres)	114 m (374 ft)	Sulu	ARMM	5°58′11″N 121°10′13″E	One of the four crater lakes of Jolo island
Pandin	crater lake	21 ha (52 acres)	225 m (738 ft)	Laguna	IV-A	14°6′52″N 121°22′8″E	One of the seven lakes of San Pablo City
Pantabangan	reservoir	5,923 ha (14,640 acres)	202 m (663 ft)	Nueva Ecija	III	15°50′9″N 121°9′18″E	Largest man-made lake in the Philippines
Paoay	tectonic lake	403 ha (1,000 acres)	15 m (49 ft)	Ilocos Norte	I	18°7′12″N 120°32′4″E	
Pinag-ulbuan	crater lake	2 ha (4.9 acres)	19 m (62 ft)	Batangas	IV-A	14°1′21″N 121°0′54″E	Located on eastern side of Taal Volcano Island
Pinamaloy	tectonic lake	60 ha (150 acres)	312 m (1,024 ft)	Bukidnon	X	7°40′15″N 124°59′59″E	Also known as Lake Pinamalay
Pinatubo	crater lake	183 ha (450 acres)	926 m (3,038 ft)	Zambales	III	15°8′37″N 120°20′56″E	Summit crater lake created after the 1991 eruption of Mount Pinatubo.
Pulangi	reservoir	1,985 ha (4,910 acres)	340 m (1,120 ft)	Bukidnon	X	7°48′31″N 125°2′19″E	Powers Pulangi IV Hydroelectric Plant and provides drinking water for Bukidnon
Pulog	crater lake	2 ha (4.9 acres)	829 m (2,720 ft)	Sorsogon	V	13°2′33″N 123°58′55″E	On the summit of Mt. Pulog in the Pocdol Mountains near Bacon, Sorsogon
Sampaloc	crater lake	104 ha (260 acres)	134 m (440 ft)	Laguna	IV-A	14°4′42″N 121°19′49″E	One of the seven lakes of San Pablo City
San Marcos	lahar-dammed	24 ha (59 acres)	222 m (728 ft)	Tarlac	III	15°18′49″N 120°23′27″E	One of the lakes created by lahar from the 1991 eruption of Mount Pinatubo
San Roque	reservoir	882 ha (2,180 acres)	155 m (509 ft)	Pangasinan & Benguet	I & CAR	16°9′38″N 120°41′28″E	The third reservoir on the Agno River after Ambuklao and Binga Lakes
Sani	crater lake	11 ha (27 acres)	130 m (430 ft)	Sulu	ARMM	5°56′4″N 121°21′0″E	One of the four crater lakes of Jolo island
Sapa	tectonic lake	112 ha (280 acres)	23 m (75 ft)	Tawi-Tawi	ARMM	7°0′37″N 118°29′28″E	
Sebu		354 ha (870 acres)	1,000 m (3,300 ft)	South Cotabato	XII	6°13′44″N 124°42′18″E	
Seit	crater lake	59 ha (150 acres)	17 m (56 ft)	Sulu	ARMM	5°59′17″N 121°12′40″E	One of the four crater lakes of Jolo island
Singuan	crater lake	112 ha (280 acres)	23 m (75 ft)	Tawi-Tawi	ARMM	6°58′19″N 118°29′15″E	One of the three adjacent crater lakes in Mapun, one is open to the sea so is technically not a lake.
Sungculan	tectonic lake	49 ha (120 acres)	0 m (0 ft)	Bohol	VII	9°38′6″N 123°50′11″E	Sungculan is a saltwater lake located in Brgy. Songculan in Dauis
Taal		23,420 ha (57,900 acres)	5 m (16 ft)	Batangas	IV-A	13°58′33″N 121°0′48″E	
Taal Main Crater	crater lake	121 ha (300 acres)	5 m (16 ft)	Batangas	IV-A	14°0′41″N 120°59′52″E	
Tambo	lahar-dammed	79 ha (200 acres)	286 m (938 ft)	Tarlac	III	15°17′47″N 120°22′23″E	One of the lakes created by lahar from the 1991 eruption of Mount Pinatubo
Tikub	crater lake	47 ha (120 acres)	53 m (174 ft)	Quezon	IV-A	13°57′46″N 121°18′23″E	Also known as Lake Ticob, Ticab or Ticub
Timpuok	crater lake	32 ha (79 acres)	3 m (9.8 ft)	Sulu	ARMM	6°2′16″N 121°10′45″E	One of the four crater lakes of Jolo island
Tinagong Dagat	crater lake	4 ha (9.9 acres)	915 m (3,002 ft)	Iloilo	VI	11°4′31″N 122°19′42″E	Located in Lambunao, Iloilo. Possibly a crater lake.
Uacon	tectonic lake	70 ha (170 acres)	0 m (0 ft)	Zambales	III	15°40′19″N 119°56′24″E	Uacon Lake is a saltwater lake connected to the sea by a 2-km river.
Uyaan	tectonic lake	28 ha (69 acres)	343 m (1,125 ft)	Lanao del Sur	ARMM	7°51′41″N 124°3′29″E	Also known as Lake Ugaan
Venado	tectonic lake		2,194 m (7,198 ft)	Cotabato	XII	7°0′11″N 125°16′3″E	Located on the slope of the tallest mountain in the Philippines, Mount Apo
Wood	tectonic lake	738 ha (1,820 acres)	320 m (1,050 ft)	Zamboanga del Sur	IX	7°50′36″N 123°9′47″E	
Yagumyum	crater lake	1 ha (2.5 acres)	1,422 m (4,665 ft)	Negros Oriental	XVIII	9°15′3″N 123°11′12″E	Straddled between Talinis Peak and Yagumyum Peak of Cuernos de Negros
Yambo	crater lake	5 ha (12 acres)	225 m (738 ft)	Laguna	IV-A	14°7′9″N 121°21′59″E	One of the seven crater lakes of San Pablo City

== Gallery ==
=== Largest and deepest lakes ===
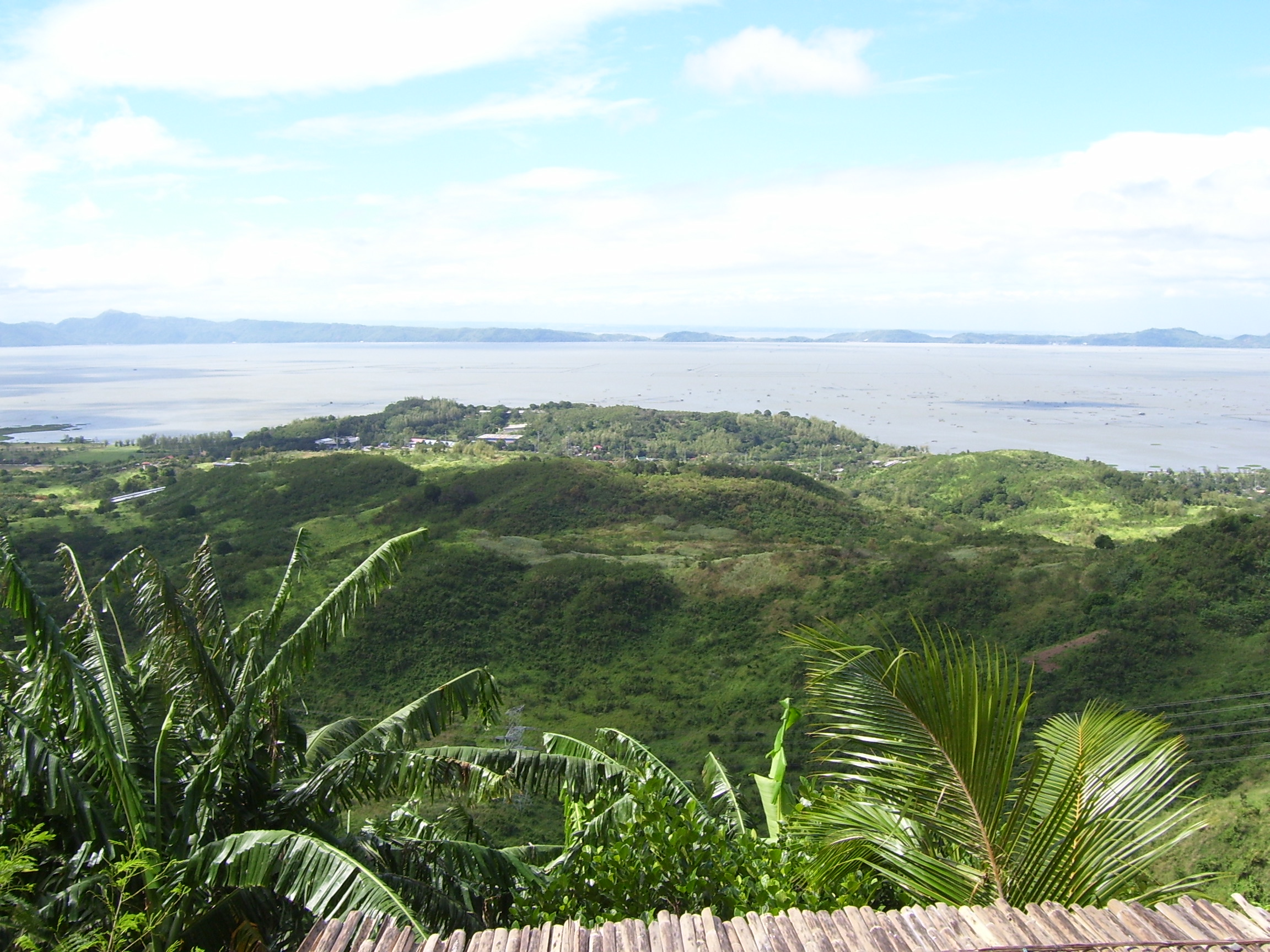
Laguna de Bay, the largest lake in the Philippines

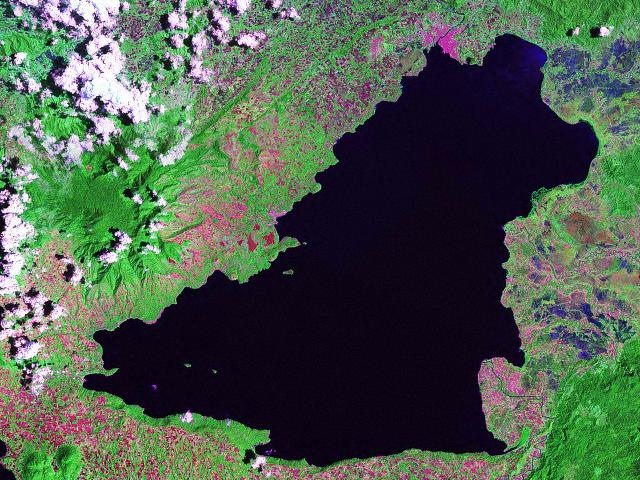
Lake Lanao, second largest

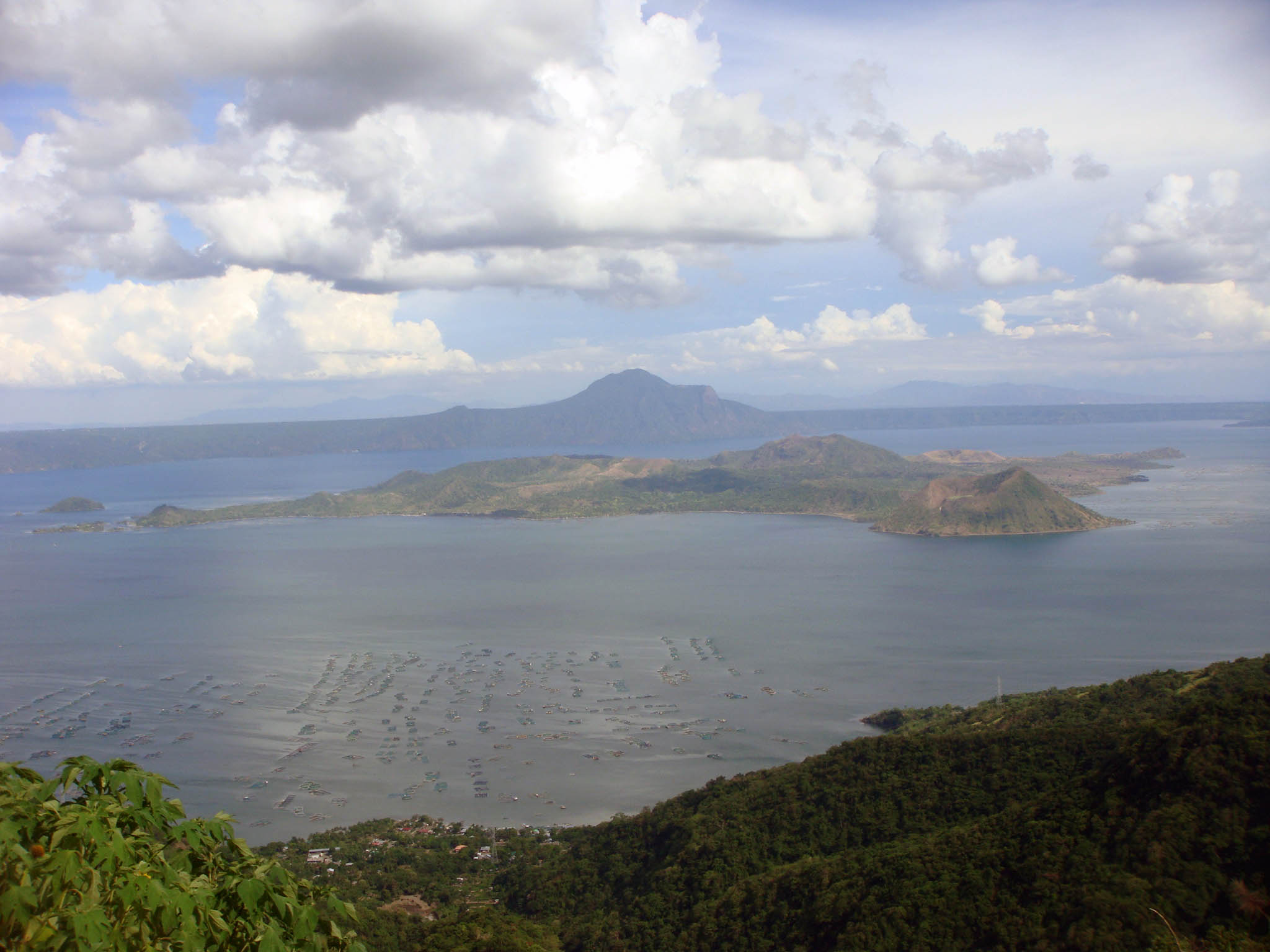
Taal Lake, third largest

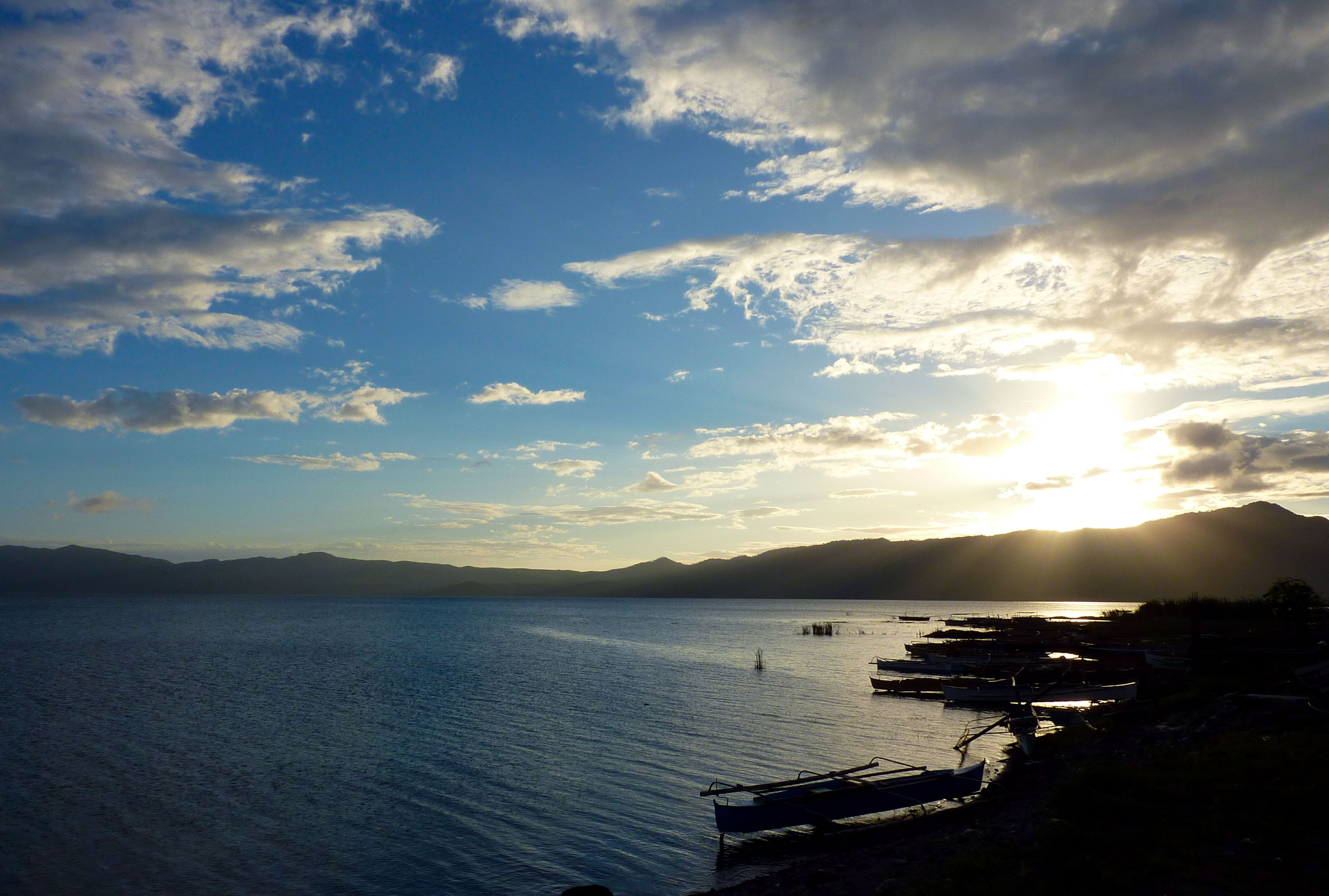
Lake Mainit, fourth largest, and the second deepest

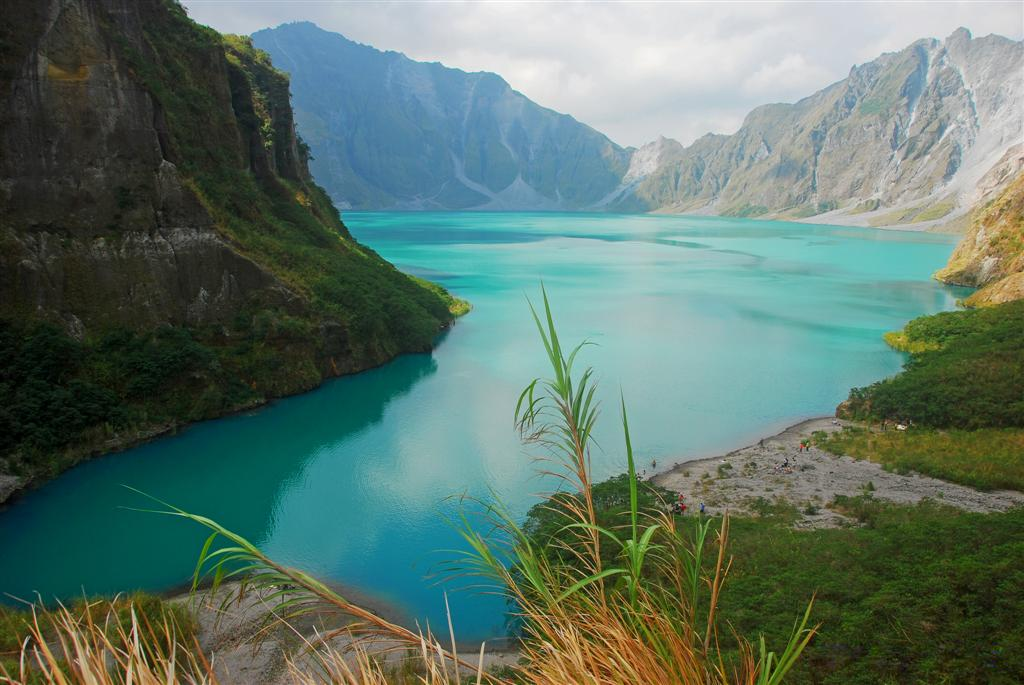
Lake Pinatubo, formed in 1991, is one of the country's youngest lakes.

== See also ==
- Media related to Lakes of the Philippines at Wikimedia Commons
- Geography of the Philippines
- Outline of the Philippines
