= Laguna Volcanic Field =

Active volcanic field in southern Luzon, Philippines

- San Pablo Volcanic Field
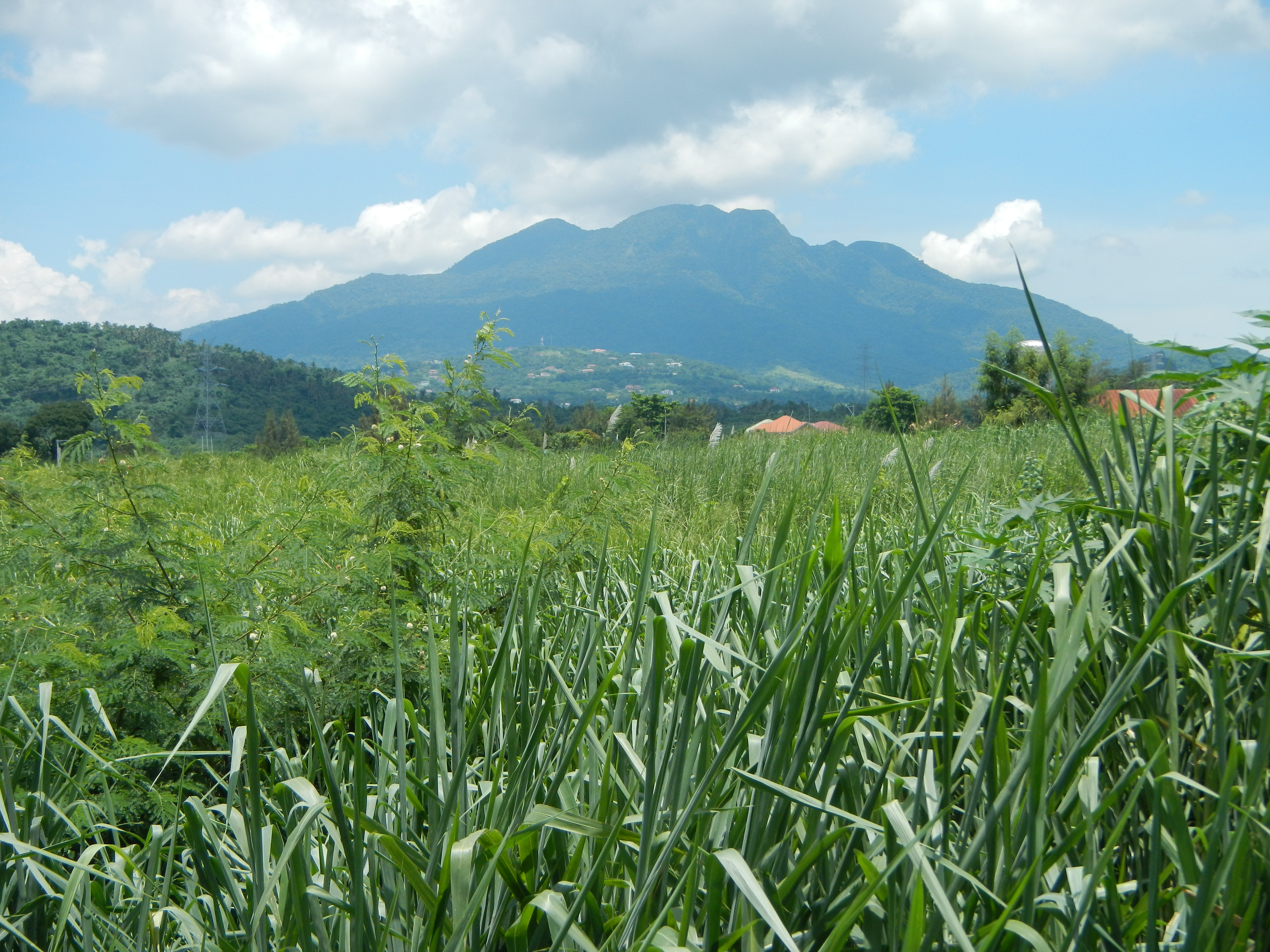
- Mount Makiling, the tallest volcano in the Laguna Volcanic Field

Highest point
- Elevation: 1,090 m (3,580 ft)
- Coordinates: 14°07′N 121°18′E

Geography
- Location within Philippines
- Location: Luzon, Philippines

Geology
- Rock age: Pleistocene to Holocene
- Volcanic zone: Macolod Corridor
- Volcanic arc: Luzon Volcanic Arc
- Last eruption: 1350 ± 100 years

The Laguna Volcanic Field, also known as the San Pablo Volcanic Field, is an active volcanic field in the Philippines, located between Laguna de Bay, Mount Banahaw volcano complex and Mount Malepunyo range. It is part of the larger Southwestern Luzon Volcanic Field (SWLVF). From Manila, it is about 50 kilometres (31 mi) southeast to Mount Makiling, its most prominent volcanic feature.

The field is composed of over 200 dormant and monogenetic maars, crater lakes, scoria cones, and stratovolcanoes, the tallest of which is Mount Makiling at 1,090 m (3,580 ft) in elevation. Many of the maars are aligned along a NE-SW trend. Three generations of maars are present, with the oldest being sediment-filled, like the ones found in Calauan. The youngest maars contain deep lakes with many concentrated in the city of San Pablo. The youngest maar, 1.2-kilometre (0.75 mi) wide Sampaloc Lake was formed about 500–700 years ago according to local legend, the last major activity in the volcanic field.

Volcanism is still evident through the presence of geothermal areas like mud and hot springs. The areas south of Mt. Makiling is the site of one of the earliest geothermal plants in the country.

== Volcanic features ==
The Philippine Institute of Volcanology and Seismology (PHIVOLCS) lists some of the maars and cones situated in the Laguna volcanic field. All are classified as inactive.

=== Maars ===
- Alligator Lake, Los Baños 14°10′57″N 121°12′23″E
- Lake Bunot, San Pablo 14°04′53″N 121°20′38″E
- Lake Calibato, San Pablo 14°06′12″N 121°22′41″E
- Lake Gunao, Dolores, Quezon 14°0′4″N 121°22′17″E
- Imoc Maar, San Pablo 14°6′22″N 121°17′47″E
- Lake Muhikap, San Pablo 14°7′20″N 121°20′3″E
- Lake Palakpakin, San Pablo 14°6′37″N 121°20′24″E
- Lake Pandin, San Pablo 14°6′52″N 121°22′8″E
- Sampaloc Lake, San Pablo 14°4′42″N 121°19′49″E
- Lake Tikub, Tiaong, Quezon 13°57′46″N 121°18′23″E
- Lake Yambo, San Pablo 14°07′9″N 121°21′59″E
- Dolotina Maar, San Pablo 14°5′58″N 121°17′53″E

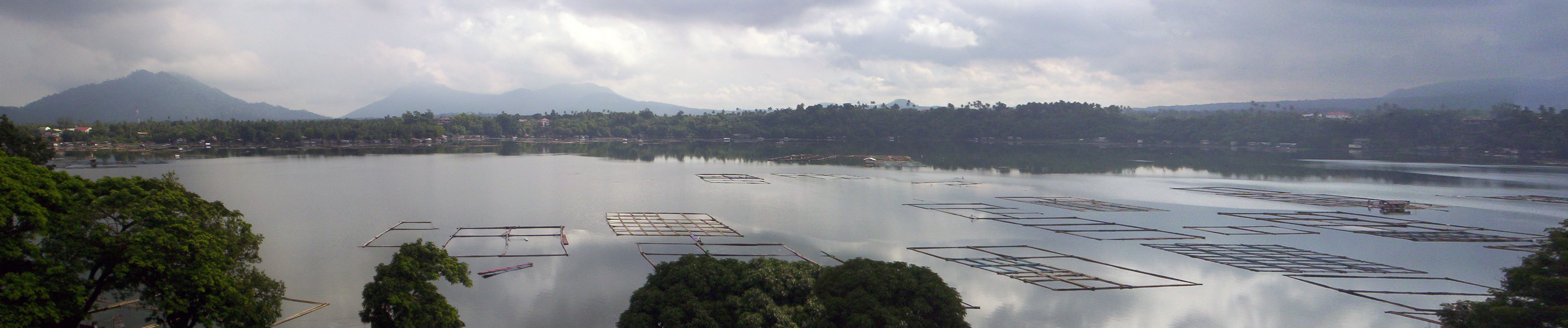
Sampaloc Lake maar with (from L to R) Mounts Lagula, Nagcarlan and Atimba in the background. The slope to the right is the base of Mount Banahaw.

=== Cones ===
Named as hills

- Bayaquitos Hill, Nagcarlan 14°9′20.2″N 121°23′17.8″E
- Bunsulan Hills, Alaminos 14°02′6.2″N 121°14′19.7″E
- La Mesa Hill, Calamba 14°8′56.7″N 121°9′50.5″E
- Mani Hill, Alaminos 14°02′10.2″N 121°15′43.5″E
- Mapait Hills, Alaminos 14°2′40.9″N 121°14′15.2″E
- Mayondon Hill, Los Baños 14°11′44.9″N 121°14′16.9″E
- Palindan Hill, Alaminos 14°1′49.9″N 121°15′19.6″E
- Tanza Hill, Alaminos 14°02′2.5″N 121°15′29.4″E

Named as mountains

- Mount Atimla, Nagcarlan 14°8′56.3″N 121°21′56.21″E
- Mount Bayaquitos, Nagcarlan 14°9′23.1″N 121°23′46.0″E
- Mount Bijiang, Calamba 14°9′41.5″N 121°9′58.4″E
- Mount Buboy, Calauan 14°05′47.0″N 121°14′36.9″E
- Mount Bulalo, Calauan 14°6′4.5″N 121°13′34.5″E
- Mount Cabulugan, Bay 16°7′6.2″N 121°12′50″E
- Mount Camotes, Calamba 14°9′43.6″N 121°9′8.2″E
- Mount Kalisungan, Calauan 14°8′48.2″N 121°20′41.0″E
- Mount Lagula, Calauan 14°07′27.2″N 121°19′19.3″E
- Mount Lansay, Nagcarlan 14°7′37″N 121°23′59″E
- Mount Luyong, Calauan 14°06′34.3″N 121°14′45.5″E
- Mount Mabilog, San Pablo 14°06′20.6″N 121°15′40.9″E
- Mount Malauban, San Pablo 14°7′5.0″N 121°22′16.2″E
- Mount Malauban-Lansay, San Pablo 14°7′12.2″N 121°22′59.0″E
- Mount Mapula, Calauan 14°05′55″N 121°16′50.9″E
- Mount Masaia, Calamba 14°9′12.0″N 121°9′21.4″E
- Mount Obabis, Calauan 14°6′45.5″N 121°18′15.4″E
- Mount Olila, Alaminos 14°04′40.2″N 121°12′52.1″E
- Mount Tamlong, Calauan 14°4′55.7″N 121°14′26.7″E

== See also ==
- Laguna Caldera
- Seven Lakes of San Pablo
- List of volcanoes in the Philippines
  - List of active volcanoes in the Philippines
  - List of potentially active volcanoes in the Philippines
  - List of inactive volcanoes in the Philippines
