= History of fisheries in the Philippines =

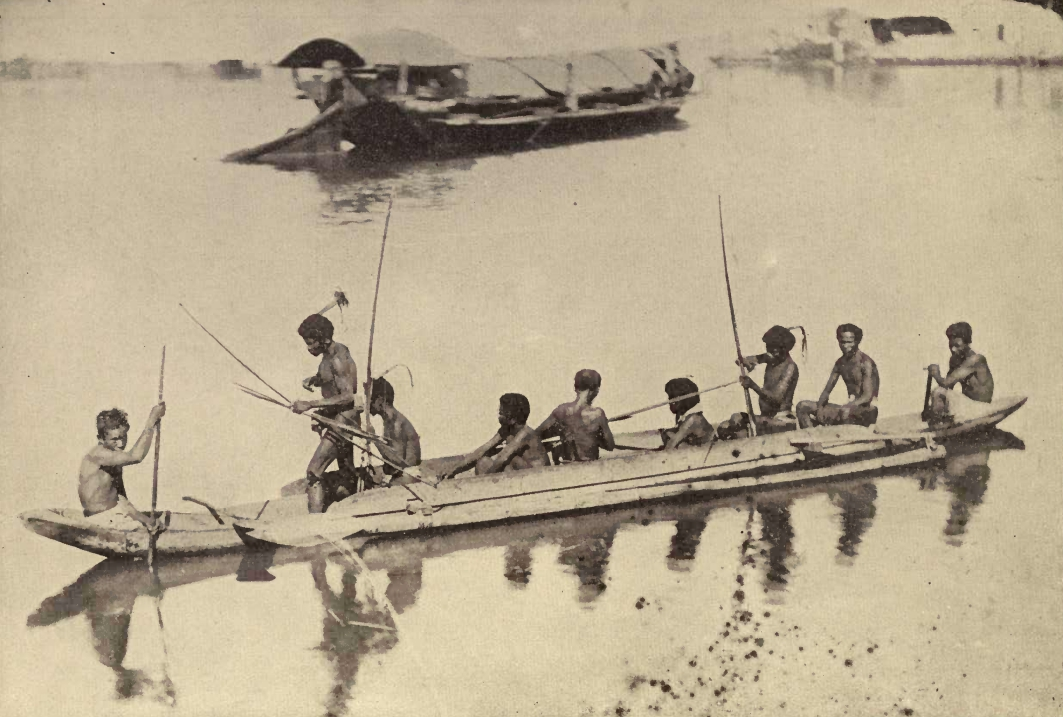
A negrito fishing boat in 1899

Fisheries in the Philippines have played an important role in the livelihoods of people in the archipelago throughout recorded history. Fishing is present within traditional folklore and continues to play an important role in modern livelihoods in the Philippines, both for sustenance and for commercial activities. Early coastal communities likely fished both for sustenance and for trade. Fisheries resources would have fallen under the control of local leaders. In addition to capture fishing, some communities also practiced aquaculture, farming milkfish in brackish coastal fish ponds. Spanish rule saw control over resources shift to central authorities, however, there was little actual management.

American rule during the early 20th century coincided with demographic growth and technological development which saw fisheries expand in importance. Towns developed based on fishing as a primary activity, and new forms of aquaculture took hold. Fisheries management was expanded through the Fisheries Act of 1932, which created the concept of municipal waters to encompass both inland waters and waters near the coast. It also introduced licensing and excluded non-American and non-Filipino fishing vessels from Philippine waters.

Rapid expansion after World War II came alongside huge increases in fishery fleet efficiency and reach. This quick expansion caused overfishing, especially depleting the municipal fisheries close to the shore. Nonetheless, the government continued to promote the exploitation of fisheries as an economic resource. Commercial fisheries expanded, and in the 1970s the Philippines became a leading global supplier of tuna. Aquaculture also expanded, especially following the introduction of the Nile tilapia. This expansion of fishing fleets and decrease in fish populations led to economic difficulties among fisherfolk. Government attempts to address this slowly led to more involved fisheries management. Marine protected areas began to be established in the 1970s.

The Local Government Code of 1991 marked a significant shift, devolving management of municipal waters to local government (cities and municipalities), and expanding these waters to encompass 15 kilometres (9.3 mi) of coastal waters. The Fisheries Code of 1998 reinforced this change, barring commercial fishing in municipal waters. Management efforts since then have continued to facilitate sustainable local use, and aquaculture has continued to expand, supplying both domestic and international markets. In 2019, Philippine waters were divided into Fisheries Management Areas (FMAs), which allow for more targeted management of different areas while also providing a mechanism for collaboration between relevant local and national bodies.

== Early history ==
What is now the Philippines has a long history of coastal fishing communities, with folklore referencing relationships with fish and fishing. In addition to finfish and invertebrates, other marine species traditionally hunted include sea turtles, dugong, and cetaceans. Control of coastal resources was likely exercised by barangay chiefs. Coastal communities likely traded their fisheries products for goods such as rice and cotton from inland communities.

The first farmed fish is thought to be milkfish (locally called bangus), whose fry was collected from tidal waters and raised in brackish ponds. The water of these ponds was supplied by the tides, with food either coming with the tide or caught from the wild. The practice eventually evolved into a series of ponds allowed the fish to be moved as they grew larger. The original technique likely came from the East Javan mainland or its offshore island of Madura prior to the Spanish arrival to the Philippines. The traditional practice persisted in Mactan, Cebu, until 1921.

During Spanish rule the Spanish Law of Waters was implemented via the royal decree of Isabella II on August 8, 1866. This law gave control of all coastal resources to the Manila authorities, from whom they could be leased for use. However, for most resources, there was no management, and so exploitation was effectively unrestricted. Chinese immigration during this period introduced new fishing equipment such as Salambáw nets that allowed for larger catches to supply growing urban populations. The Spanish Law of Waters still has some provisions in force to this day, as laid out by the 1912 Irrigation Act, including the declaration of the foreshore as public land. At the end of the 19th century, sapyaw (or sapiao) nets began to spread, and other new net types followed.

== Early 20th century ==
A growing population during American rule saw demand for fish increase. Beam trawling was introduced by Japanese fishermen in the early 20th century, as well as muro-ami nets. This increase in productivity and increased demand led to the development of larger towns whose economy was based upon fishing. American rule also saw the first quantitative research into Philippine fisheries, with 116,799 fisherfolk identified in a 1905 census, who each may have caught an average of 4.2 tons per year. Dynamite fishing is recorded in the Lingayen Gulf as far back as World War I.

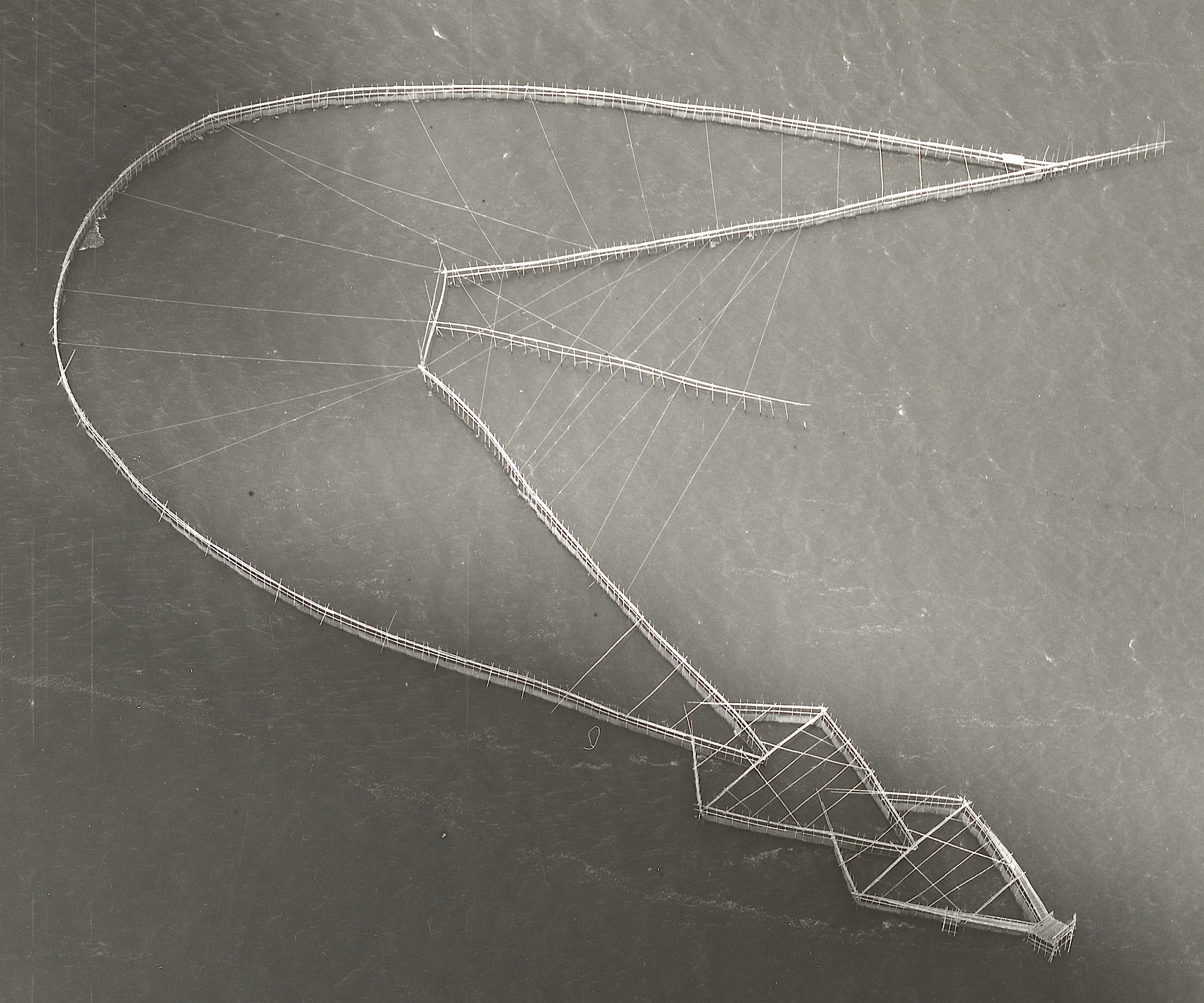
A fish trap in Manila Bay in 1933

The Fisheries Act of 1932 (Act 4003) was enacted on December 5, 1932. It restricted fishing access to American and Filipino companies and created the concept of municipal waters, which reached 3 nautical miles (5.6 km; 3.5 mi) from the shore, within which only municipal governments could create fish ponds and corrals, catch milkfish fry, and license ships smaller than 3 tons. Larger ships were licensed by the Secretary of Agriculture and Natural Resources. The 1932 law was the introduction of the concepts of registration and licensing. Aside from municipal fisheries, it created the concept of national fisheries, applying to both inland fisheries and specific marine fisheries, and the concept of reserve fisheries, which would be any fisheries designated by Presidential decree to be as such. Later laws shifted control over fish ponds and corrals back from municipal governments to the national government. The 1935 Commonwealth of the Philippines constitution reserved fisheries for the use of Filipinos or mostly Filipino-owned companies.

Freshwater fish ponds were likely first used sometime in the early 20th century, although there is history of small-scale rice-fish system use. 1905 saw the introduction of three species of Hawaiian mosquitofish, and the largemouth bass was imported from California. In 1915, Eurasian carp began to be farmed, being imported from Hong Kong. In 1916 and 1918 the carp was also introduced into natural lakes in Mindanao. In 1925 the Bureau of Science imported 16,000 juvenile carp from China. Giant gourami were imported from Thailand in 1927. Later introductions include Trichogaster gourami species in 1938, and bighead carp, silver carp, and Indian carp in 1967 and 1968. Despite this, production remained limited due to competition with cropland and a cultural preference for marine fish. Freshwater farming did not significantly expand until the introduction of Nile tilapia in the 1970s.

Oyster farming was established in 1931 in Hinigaran, Negros Oriental, using the "broadcast" method where oysters are simply laid on the seabed. In the years afterward it was introduced with new methods to Binakayan in Cavite by the Bureau of Science, leading to the area around Manila Bay becoming the center of oyster farming in the Philippines. It later spread throughout the country, and where shipping navigation was not a potential issue, it was able to be farmed with deliberately placed substrates.

Due to the reliance on wild catch to support traditional milkfish ponds, shrimp fry often also ended up in these ponds. When this happened, such shrimp were also harvested from milkfish ponds. Species known to have been farmed as a secondary product include jumbo tiger shrimp, Indian prawns, and Penaeus merguiensis. Metapenaeus ensis may also have been farmed. Fish ponds were also occasionally contaminated with seaweed, such as sea lettuce. Seaweed was already harvested wild for eating, and gained increasing use as fish food.

Fisheries Administrative Order No. 14 of 1937 established the Fishpond Lease Agreement (FLA) system and a Fishpond Permit (FP) system. The FP system was an annual rent of government land in order to operate a fish pond. The FLA system provided for 10-year loans that could be renewed four times. The maximum size that could be rented was 200 hectares (490 acres). Due to the reliance on wild catch to support traditional milkfish ponds, shrimp fry often also ended up in these ponds. When this happened, such shrimp were also harvested from milkfish ponds. Species known to have been farmed as a secondary product include jumbo tiger shrimp, Indian prawns, and Penaeus merguiensis. Metapenaeus ensis may also have been farmed. Fish ponds were also occasionally contaminated with seaweed, such as sea lettuce. Seaweed was already harvested wild for eating, and gained increasing use as fish food.

In 1939, the Fish and Game Administrative Order No. 13 created the first closed season, limiting the fishing of herrings and sardines in parts of the Visayan Sea between November 15 and March 15. This roughly covered the spawning season. Although modified and occasionally suspended, this closed season has remained in place since. The first national park, the Hundred Islands National Park, was established in 1940 and included marine areas.

== Technological development and commercial expansion ==
After World War II, the Philippines led the modernization of Southeast Asian fisheries. At this time, municipal fisheries were 150% larger than commercial ones. The rapid development and adoption of new technology greatly increased fishery intensity. Active gear, such as trawl nets, began to supplant passive gear, such as fish corrals, although passive gear remained common in small-scale fisheries. Trawl nets increased in efficiency. Motor boats began to spread, increasing range and mobility. In capture fisheries, otter trawlers began to be widely adopted, and in the 1960s purse seines became more common. Explosive and chemical fishing was banned through Republic Act No. 428, on June 7, 1950.

The fishing of milkfish in the sea was banned on August 5, 1949, through Fisheries Administrative Order 25 in order to ensure fry would be available to stock inland lakes and aquaculture. Accidental Caulerpa lentillifera contamination, possibly due to use as fish food, shifted to deliberate cultivation in Mactan during the early 1950s to meet local demand, becoming the first commercially farmed seaweed species.

The maximum area that could be leased to an individual to create fish ponds was decreased in 1954 to 100 hectares (250 acres). This was further decreased to 50 hectares (120 acres) in 1959, although the area that could be leased to corporations increased to 400 hectares (990 acres). Land area restrictions were often bypassed, for example by having multiple individuals within one family apply separately. The lease length was extended to 20 years in 1960 through Fisheries Administrative Order No. 60, and to 25 years in 1979 through Fisheries Administrative Order No. 129.

By the mid-1960s, production was double what it was in 1951. Overall, there was an almost sixfold increase in fishing effort from this period to the mid-1980s. Some fisheries in Manila Bay were likely already close to being overfished during the 1950s. The ornamental fish trade also started in the 1950s, initially for export to Europe and the United States. The technological development of the industry benefited existing capital holders, and commercial production soon began to outstrip the previously dominant municipal fisheries. The government encouraged this increasing output, without regard to environmental sustainability.

Mozambique tilapia were imported from Thailand by Deogracias Villadolid, Director of the Bureau of Fisheries, in 1950. Tilapia were much easier to breed than milkfish, making it possible for anyone to maintain a small-scale tilapia farm in a simple backyard pond as small as 10 square metres (110 sq ft). This practice became quickly popular, and in many cases, ponds became overcrowded, leading to fish becoming stunted. Unwanted fish were released into the wild, where they have become an invasive species affecting not only the environment but also milkfish and shrimp ponds. While BFAR did grow juveniles for distribution, the spread of tilapia was not driven by BFAR. News media called the tilapia a "wonder fish", and politicians seeking to curry favor with their constituents sought juveniles for distribution.

Mussel farming began with a 300 square metres (3,200 sq ft) Perna viridis enclosure in Binakayan, Cavite, established by the Bureau of Fisheries in 1955 in an existing oyster farm. This saw mussels grown on bamboo poles, an attempt to shift the view of oyster farmers from treating mussels as a pest to treating them as another commodity. Production remained around Manila Bay until the 1970s, due to the limited natural range of Perna viridis. Some stock was imported from Thailand in the 1960s, to unknown impact. (The widespread Modiolus modulaides (Note: Formerly Modiolus metcalfei) is unsuitable for aquaculture.) Perna viridis eventually spread to other areas, such as Sapian Bay and Batan Bay in Panay and Maqueda Bay Samar, possibly as biofouling pollution in bilge water. In 1976, attempts began in Sapian Bay to farm mussels on nylon ropes webbed across bamboo on the seafloor. Other attempts saw ropes suspended from rafts, although neither method became popular. As of 1980, there were 1,125 oyster farms covering 460.3 hectares (1,137 acres) and 629 mussel farms covering 230.2 hectares (569 acres).

In the 1960s, crabs of the Scylla genus, which had previously been opportunistically farmed in milkfish ponds, began to be more actively managed, being deliberately fenced into fish ponds. Economic benefits were limited by the high cost of feeding meat to crabs. Farming crabs within natural mangrove forests is one method used to reduce overhead costs.

Demersal fisheries peaked in the late 1960s in most areas, although some fisheries continued to grow around Palawan, the southern Sulu Sea, and a small part of the East coast. A number of provinces banned trawling at various points starting from 1954, until May 1983 when Letter of Instruction 1328 banned trawling within 7 kilometres (4.3 mi) of the shore or in water shallower than 7 fathoms nationwide. Demersal catches did not increase after 1976. Deep-sea fishing began with Squalidae exploitation, primarily of the Centrophorus genus, near San Joaquin, Iloilo, in 1967.

Distribution technology, by roads and by sea, also improved during this time, providing larger markets for catches. Capture fisheries grew steadily until the mid-1970s, and started growing again in the mid-1980s until the 1990s. While municipal catches decreased during parts of this period, increasing commercial catches compensated for this.

== Under martial law ==
Shortly after the declaration of martial law in 1972 under President Ferdinand Marcos, Presidential Decree 43 (the Fishery Industry Development Decree) was issued on November 9, 1972, promoting further development of the industry and creating a Fisheries Industry Development Council. The later Presidential Decree 704 of 1975 was the most significant fishery law since 1932, becoming the new basis for Philippine fisheries law upon its issuance on May 16, 1975. This decree maintained the established definition of municipal waters as being 3 nautical miles (5.6 km; 3.5 mi) from the shore, although this did not at the time exclude commercial fishing from these waters. A later amendment allowed the President to ban commercial fishing in chosen municipal waters. While municipal authorities were nominally accorded some powers, all municipal ordinances and licensing required approval by the national government. Presidential Decree 704 of 1975 promoted the exploitation of fisheries, although environmental problems had begun to become apparent, and the government began to tentatively look into coastal management near the end of that decade. The decree also brought to an end a system through which applications could be made for areas leased for aquaculture to be purchased from the government, resulting in the rejection of all applications made after November 9, 1972. Fish ponds were exempted from a Marcos-era land reform program shortly after it was launched.

President Marcos issued a decree to develop the fishing industry in 1973, which included support for the creation of family-sized fish ponds. It was also intended to stimulate commercial fish pond development, although this did not succeed. The use of one site identified as a location for commercial milkfish ponds, Vitali Island in Zamboanga, was brought back by the Southern Philippines Development Authority in the 1980s as a potential location for jumbo tiger shrimp farming as a livelihood option for former Moro National Liberation Front fighters. However, its scale was reduced and it operated just as a normal commercial farm.

Prior to the onset of seaweed aquaculture, wild Eucheuma was harvested for eating in the Visayas and Mindanao, and wild Gracilaria and Gelidiella acerosa was exported for agar. In the 1960s Indonesian Eucheuma exports from Indonesia became unreliable. The resulting demand, due to the carrageenan in Eucheuma, led to exports from the Philippines. The first export was of 150 tons, which grew to 450 tons by 1968. Within two years wild sources were depleted, spurring deliberate cultivation in the late 1960s. This was initiated by the University of Hawaii's Maxwell Doty, on behalf of an American company. Research was carried out by the American company in collaboration with the Bureau of Fisheries. The first commercial farm was established in Caluya in 1967, which developed submerged methods after initial surface-level lines resulted in the seaweed being oversaturated with sunlight. The farm moved to Ilin Island in 1969, and then to Sitangkai in 1971. Family farms were established in 1972, when exports were 500 tons. By 1974 farming in Sitangkai was considered self-sufficient, and they produced over 12,000 tons. In 1976, farms were established at the Danajon Bank. This was, like Sitangkai, a remote area where fisherfolk had trouble getting their catch to market, meaning a reliable second source of income was an attractive prospect.

Another experimental seaweed farm was established in Calatagan, where Kappaphycus alvarezii was discovered. This 1973 discovery was then thought a mutation of Euchemuma. Growing faster than existing varieties, it soon began to be cultivated, starting in Sulu. This allowed for a significant expansion in seaweed farming. Eucheuma denticulatum is also still farmed. At some point Gracilaria, which had been grown on a small scale as food for milkfish around Manila Bay, also began to be commercially farmed to produce agar. It is likely this began following the experience of Eucheuma farming began in 1973. Some Gracilaria was known to be exported to Japan. BFAR began research into effective commercial Gracilaria farming in the late 1980s, and the Seaweed Production Development Project was created in August 1991 by BFAR, FAO, and UNDP. By 1989 seaweed exports reached 31,000 tons, of which 60% was Eucheuma.

Bamboo fish cages were first introduced in 1965 to Laguna de Bay to experiment with farming various fish species, although their use remained limited. In the 1970s, bamboo and net milkfish pens were established in the freshwater Laguna de Bay, starting with a demonstration pen in Cardona, Rizal. This was an initiative of the Laguna Lake Development Authority, and initial tests showed a pen could produce 1,500 kilograms (3,300 lb) without any fertilizer or extra feeding. This success led to wide adoption, with 4,800 hectares (12,000 acres) of pens present by 1973. These pens produced as much fish as the remaining 85,000 hectares (210,000 acres) of lake produced in wild-caught fish. The LLDA began the Laguna de Bay Fishpen Development Project in the late 1970s to make fish pens more accessible to poorer fishermen, supported by the Asian Development Bank and the OPEC Special Fund. This was not able to compete with private expansion. Fish pen usage continued to grow, reaching 7,000 hectares (17,000 acres) in 1980, and 34,000 hectares (84,000 acres) in 1983. This oversaturation decreased the productivity of individual pens, lengthening milkfish maturation time to 7–8 months from 4-5 and causing the need for supplemental feed. Microcystis algal blooms caused milkfish and tilapia from the lake to have an "earthy-muddy" taste, reducing market value. Many fish pens became economically unfeasible and were abandoned, especially after being damaged by typhoons. By 1998, there were only 167 registered fish pens which altogether covered only 4,425 hectares (10,930 acres), which even when taking into account unregistered fish pens represented a substantial decrease.

In the late 1970s BFAR began its Blue Revolution Program, which sought to expand mussel, oyster, and seaweed farming. Other projects followed until the mid-1980s, including the establishment of four Brackishwater Aquaculture Development and Training Centers which sought to refine the farming of milkfish in different climates, and the creation of the National Freshwater Fisheries Technology Center which bred and sold tilapia juveniles.

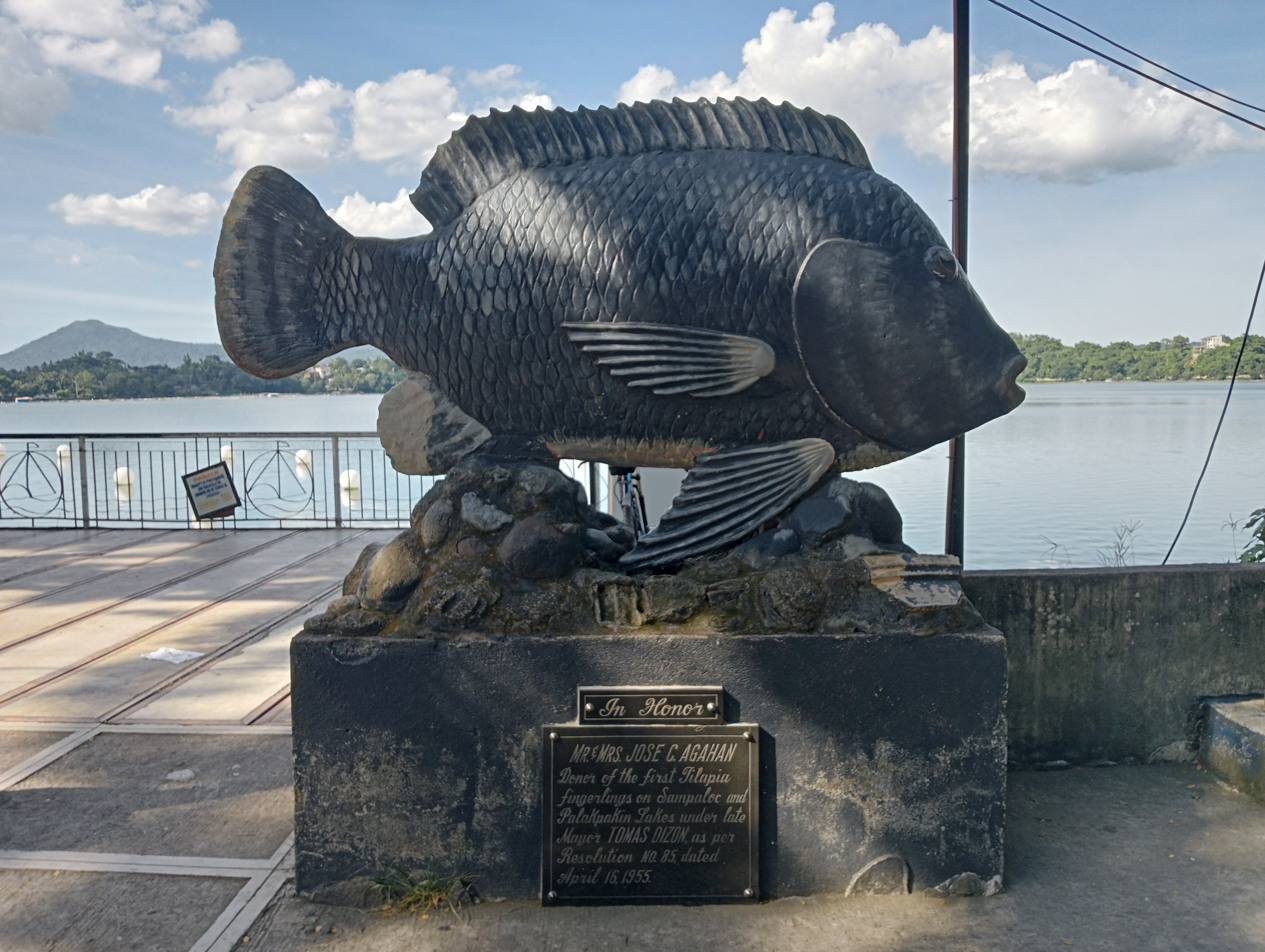
A monument in San Pablo, Laguna, celebrating the introduction of tilapia to Lake Palakpakin and Lake Sampaloc

The 1970s and early 1980s saw the introduction of new tilapia species and hybrids, most crucially Nile tilapia, first imported in 1972. While Nile tilapia did not do as well in brackish water as Mozambique tilapia, they grew faster than Mozambique tilapia, and were resilient to poor environmental conditions. Nile tilapia were also more popular with consumers. In the same period, it became possible to farm single-gender ponds so no breeding occurred. Experiments found that ponds could be monosexed through the use of androgens, and later ponds could be bred from genetically modified males with YY chromosomes. These two changes allowed freshwater tilapia farming to expand from a small-scale seasonal enterprise into commercial production. Monosex hybrids of different species have been tested, but did not become farmed commercially. These were generally Oreochromis aureus or Oreochromis urolepis hornorum males bred with Mozambique or Nile tilapia females. These hybrids have also been experimented with for saline tolerance.

The first Nile tilapia fish cages were trialed in Laguna de Bay, and in 1976 they were produced commercially in floating cages in Lake Bunot. The practice spread to Lake Bato, Lake Buhi, Lake Buluan, Lake Maini, Lake Sampaloc, and Lake Taal. The Laguna de Bay market saw rapid success due to being able to supply the large Metro Manila market. While the traditional provider of juveniles was BFAR, a private hatchery industry quickly developed in this area. While wild-caught fry were available in some areas, such fry were likely affected by hybridization with Mozambique tilapia. By the mid-1980s, tilapia were the second most farmed fish after milkfish. In some areas it had a dramatic effect. One barangay in Bay, Laguna, saw a huge shift in income as one-third of all households created backyard hatcheries, often as a secondary source of income.

Seabass were introduced to tilapia ponds in the 1970s as an attempt to manage overcrowding. Demand in the Western Visayas led to deliberate cultivation in the mid-1980s, although it was not very profitable. The farming of Epinephelus groupers began after this, possibly starting with the raising of smaller wild-caught individuals. This proved more profitable, and created a market for stunted tilapia to serve as food.

Jumbo tiger shrimp were successfully bred in captivity the 1970s. Dedicated shrimp farming began in Negros Occidental in response. This farming intensified in the 1980s, concentrated on the islands of Negros and Panay. This was in response to growing demand in Japan, following the first jumbo tiger shrimp exports there in the 1970s. At this time, Japan imported 80% of Asian jumbo tiger shrimp exports. As sugar exports declined, sugar fields were often converted into aquaculture farms. Jumbo tiger shrimp became the largest marine export of the Philippines, reaching a high of US$300 million in exports in 1992. The expansion was slowed by the death of Japanese emperor Hirohito in 1989, which reduced demand. Meanwhile, intensive farming had led to antibiotic-resistant diseases such as luminous vibriosis spreading within Negros Occidental. While there was a substantial decline in production due to these events, shrimp farming continued outside of Negros. The shrinking of the Japanese market in the 1990s led to decline in Philippine production, although it began to recover in the 2000s. Farming of the other shrimp species did not expand to the same amount. While the shrimp of other Penaeus species could be bred, this cost the same as breeding jumbo tiger shrimp and produced smaller adults. The farming of Indian prawns and Penaeus merguiensis continued to rely on wild-caught fry. Giant freshwater prawns have been sporadically cultivated since the relevant technology was introduced in the 1970s. The first dedicated commercial production began in 1981, but failed. A hatchery is operated by BFAR.

Barramundi, which had opportunistically been raised in existing ponds, saw attempts to specifically farm them in the 1980s. A 1980 ban on the conversion of mangroves to aquaculture was ineffective, with conversion rates increasing in the following years. A census of fisheries that year found that aquaculture employed 221,492 people, 24.1% of the total fisheries workforce. A 1982 study by the government and the FAO suggested the country had 9,145 hectares (22,600 acres) of potential oyster farming areas and 4,925 hectares (12,170 acres) that would be conducive to mussel farming.

The 1980s also saw a rise in fish cage use in Laguna de Bay, usually to farm tilapia more cheaply than using a fish pen. From producing 7,187 million tons in 1985, freshwater fish cages produced 35,362 million tons in 1993. That year saw marine fish cage use become large enough to be recorded, and combined production reached 43,000 million tons in 1997. By 1995, cage use had spread to Taal Lake, where 3,140 fish cages were registered under 1,138 operators. As Taal Lake is deeper than Laguna de bay, most of its fish cages are floating rather than fixed. By 1998, there were 640 fish cage farms registered with LLDA, ranging from 50 square metres (540 sq ft) to the legal maximum of 10,000 square metres (110,000 sq ft) (the average size was 2,734 square metres (29,430 sq ft)). The most common individual cage size was 12 metres (39 ft) by 15 metres (49 ft), although local governments around Laguna de Bay sought to standardize them at 10 metres (33 ft) by 10 metres (33 ft). The National Freshwater Fisheries Technology Center (then called the Fish Hatchery and Fishery Extension Center) was established by the BFAR with the assistance of USAID, becoming a significant national producer and distributor of tilapia fingerlings.

From 1981 to 1997, total seaweed production increased from 83,000 million tons to 627,105 million tons. Of the 12 provinces in which it was farmed in 1987, Tawi-Tawi was the largest with an estimated 5,000 hectares (12,000 acres) of seaweed farms. In 1986, only 199 farms were officially licensed in Tawi-Tawi, possibly only one-fifth of the total number. From 1992 to 1996, seaweed farming expanded by 17% annually, and by 1997 farms were present in 30 provinces and cities. Many seaweed farms are small-scale and farmer-owned. Seaweed farming was often carried out alongside other methods of obtaining income, such as fishing. In 1991, BFAR began a project with the assistance of UNDP and the FAO to develop Gracilaria farming in eastern Sorsogon, supporting farmers and creating a processing center to generate demand. This developed into the National Seaweed Culture Center, supporting seaweed farming throughout the country.

The tuna industry became large enough for a producers and exporters association to form in the 1970s. In 1974 the FAO brought two experimental purse seine vessels to the Philippines, which discovered the value of payao for tuna fishing. The large-scale adoption of payao by tuna fisherfolk in 1975 led to a large expansion of the industry, as well as an increase in small pelagic catch. Tuna fisheries became the most valuable in the country. Production increased until the Philippines was the largest producer in Southeast Asia in the 1980s, and as catches decreased at the end of that decade Philippine fishing fleets began to catch tuna in international waters. The decade also saw crab fisheries expand beyond artisanal tools, leading to a rapid reduction in crab populations due to trawling. In 1978, Presidential Decree 1599 established the country's exclusive economic zone, expanding the potential fisheries under Philippine jurisdiction. Executive Order 656 of 1981 created the National Committee on Illegal Entrants, whose mandate included tackling foreign fishing in Philippine waters.

During the 1970s, incomes among fisherfolk declined, and there was not enough data to set up effective management strategies. Commercial operations outcompeted small-scale fisherfolk exploiting the same fisheries, further diminishing the already shrinking fish stocks available. While the number of ships in the commercial fleet was roughly stable, the average size of these ships increased. Municipal fishery production dropped to just 30% of the total. The capture of small pelagic fish plateaued after 1975, despite still-increasing fishing effort. Capture effort for each municipal pelagic fish had already peaked in the 1950s. All fishing in the Lingayen Gulf peaked per unit effort in the late 1970s, after which it declined. In 1977, the Biyayang Dagat program was introduced to provide loans to small-scale fisherfolk, however, they were often unable to provide sufficient collateral, and the program was later discontinued. The 1970s also saw the first coastal resource management programs aimed at creating sustainability in fisheries.

In the 1970s, bamboo and net milkfish pens were established in the freshwater Laguna de Bay. This was an initiative of the Laguna Lake Development Authority, and initial tests showed a pen could produce 1,500 kilograms (3,300 lb) without any fertilizer or extra feeding. This success led to wide adoption, with 4,800 hectares (12,000 acres) of pens present by 1973. These pens produced as much fish as the remaining 85,000 hectares (210,000 acres) of lake produced in wild-caught fish. Fish ponds continued to grow, reaching 7,000 hectares (17,000 acres) in 1980, and 34,000 hectares (84,000 acres) in 1983. This oversaturation decreased the productivity of individual pens, lengthening milkfish maturation time to 7–8 months from 4-5 and necessitating supplemental feed. Microcystis algal blooms caused milkfish and tilapia from the lake to have an "earthy-muddy" taste, reducing market value. Many fish pens became economically unfeasible and were abandoned, especially after being damaged by typhoons. By 1998, there were only 167 registered fish pens which altogether covered only 4,425 hectares (10,930 acres), which even when taking into account unregistered fish pens represented a substantial decrease.

Nile tilapia were introduced in the 1970s. In the same period, it became possible to farm single-gender ponds so no breeding occurred. Initial ponds were monosexed through the use of androgens, with later ponds being bred from genetically modified males with YY chromosomes. These two changes allowed freshwater tilapia farming to expand from a small-scale seasonal enterprise into commercial production. Monosex hybrids of different species have been tested, but did not become farmed commercially.

The rabbitfish orange-spotted spinefoot and vermiculated spinefoot, as well as Scatophagus argus, saw sporadic farming in Pangasinan and elsewhere. Low-level Epinephelus grouper farming, while expensive, was more successful due to high demand in Chinese restaurants. This farming likely began with the raising of wild caught individuals deemed too small for sale. This grouper farming became particularly common in Capiz, where tilapia is sometimes used as feed. Barramundi were occasionally opportunistically raised when they entered fish ponds, and attempts to commercially farm them began in the 1980s. However, as they were in demand only in the Western Visayas, and as they are costly to raise, their farming saw limited success.

A National Rice-Fish Culture Program (Palay-isdaan in Tagalog, from palay, unhusked rice, and palaisdaan, fish pond) was launched in 1979, with Nile tilapia and common carp being stocked in rice fields modified to have a long ditch and higher dikes. The program did not achieve much success, with theoretical yields not being obtained due to a number of practical impediments. Monitoring ceased after 1986 following decreasing take-up. The 1980s also saw attempts to promote fish farming as a secondary crop for rice farmers, with ponds watered by irrigation canals. 1979 also saw the Southeast Asian Fisheries Development Center develop milkfish hatchery technology, which led to the establishment of a "National Bangos Breeding Program" in 1985. The first private milkfish hatchery was established in 1996.

The 1980s saw a shift in management responsibilities from the national governments towards local governments. The Sumilon Marine Reserve was set up in 1974, and Presidential Proclamation 1801 established the broader concept of marine reserves in 1978. Puerto Galera became a UNESCO Biosphere Reserve in 1977, the Apo Island Marine Reserve was set up in 1985, and Tubbataha Reef became a protected area in 1988 before becoming part of a Biosphere Reserve in 1990 and a World Heritage Site in 1993.

A 1980 ban on the conversion of mangroves to aquaculture was ineffective, with conversion rates increasing in the following years. Fish cage use in Laguna de Bay rose during the 1980s, usually to farm tilapia. From producing 7,187 million tons in 1985, freshwater fish cages produced 35,362 million tons in 1993. That year saw marine fish cage use become large enough to be recorded, and combined production reached 43,000 million tons in 1997. A 1982 study by the government and the FAO suggested the country had 9,145 hectares (22,600 acres) of potential oyster farming areas and 4,925 hectares (12,170 acres) that would be conducive to mussel farming. The National Freshwater Fisheries Technology Center (then called the Fish Hatchery and Fishery Extension Center) was established by the BFAR with the assistance of USAID, becoming a significant national producer and distributor of tilapia fingerlings.

Trawling decreased starting in the 1980s due to the overfishing of demersal fisheries combined with increasing cost, becoming replaced by the cheaper Danish seine. The destructive muro-ami fishing technique was banned in 1986. Opposition to the ban led to the development of a modified method, pa-aling, which was restricted to certain areas and monitored. Artificial reefs, already used as fish aggregating devices since the 1950s, began to be officially encouraged as conservation and anti-trawling devices in the 1980s. When placed in municipal waters, they often attracted illegal commercial fishing. Their overall impact was mixed, sometimes damaging. Captive giant clam breeding began in 1985, and research into breeding other vulnerable sessile invertebrates followed. Ornamental shell exports peaked in 1988, before declining significantly.

From 1981 to 1997, total seaweed production increased from 83,000 million tons to 627,105 million tons. Of the 12 provinces in which seaweed was farmed in 1987, Tawi-Tawi was the largest with an estimated 5,000 hectares (12,000 acres) of seaweed farms. In 1986, only 199 farms were officially licensed in Tawi-Tawi, possibly only one-fifth of the total number. From 1992 to 1997, seaweed farming expanded by 17% annually, and by 1997 farms were present in 30 provinces and cities. Many seaweed farms are small-scale and farmer-owned. Seaweed farming was often carried out alongside other methods of obtaining income, such as fishing. Exports of small pelagic species at a large scale started in 1986, mostly canned and dried sardines. The 1980s also saw the live fish trade shift from ornamental fish to fish for food.

== Towards sustainable management ==
The newly created 1987 constitution included a specific reference to the "preferential use" of fishing resources by "subsistence fishermen". A presidential committee on illegal fishing and marine conservation was established in 1989.

In 1986, President Corazon Aquino re-included fish ponds in the Comprehensive Agrarian Reform Program through executive order, which was reinforced through law in 1988. This measure was intended to redistribute fish ponds if their size exceeded 5 hectares (12 acres). A BFAR order to increase the cost of FLA land leases from PhP 50.00 per 1 hectare (2.5 acres) to PhP 1000.00 was blocked by the Couth of Appeals following legal action by the Chamber of Fisheries and Aquatic Resources. Lobbying against land reform, (Note: The Negros Prawn Producers and Marketing Cooperative wrote in 1998: "the implementation of the (land reform) law is liable to cause widespread strife among the landowners.....There is no showing that land reform will enliven the plight of the poor. Without undermining their capabilities, it is also doubtful whether they (the farmers) can put up the necessary capital to maximize land use. Having been used to having a landlord on whom to call in times of need, this plunge to independence may have a crippling effect.") supported by BFAR, resulted in fish ponds once again being exempted in 1995. This was justified as a measure to protect the shrimp farming industry, although the industry declined nonetheless. The Local Government Code of 1991 shifted seaweed licencing responsibilities from the national government, which allowed seaweed farms to have a maximum size of 1 hectare (2.5 acres), to local governments.

By 1987, PhP 1 billion had been invested in Laguna de Bay fish pens, which stretched across 34,000 hectares (84,000 acres), employed 100,000 people, and produced 130,000 tons of fish. In 1988, aquaculture produced 26.4% of fisheries output.

The Philippine Council for Agriculture and Resources Research and Development (PCARRD) handled government research until 1987, when the Philippine Council for Aquatic and Marine Research and Development (PCAMRD) was created. Development of genetically improved farmed tilapia (GIFT) began at Central Luzon State University (CLSU) in 1988. This university partnered with BFAR, the International Center for Living Aquatic Resources, and the Norwegian Institute for Aquaculture Research, and was funded by the Asian Development Bank and the United Nations Development Programme. At the same time, CLSU was also carrying out the "Genetic Manipulation for Improved Tilapia" program, funded by the UK Overseas Development Administration. Both began to have commercial applications in the mid-1990s. The GIFT project became replaced by a non-profit, the GIFT Foundation International, Inc, from December 1997.

In 1991, BFAR began a project to grow Gracilaria in eastern Sorsogon, with the assistance of UNDP and the FAO. This developed into the National Seaweed Culture Center.

=== Devolution ===
In 1991, local governments became empowered in areas including fishing through Republic Act 7160 (the Local Government Code of 1991), now explicitly able to regulate without national government approval. This enabled more specific management of these coastal areas, and coastal resource management with the aim of sustainability became more common. It also expanded municipal waters from 7 kilometres (4.3 mi) to 15 kilometres (9.3 mi), shifting commercial fishing further from the shore, although in a way that created legal uncertainty around commercial fishing licensing and activities. In 1992, the National Integrated Protected Areas System Act (RA 7586) created a common framework for protected areas, including marine ones. This came during a period of political conflict due to increasing disputes over fisheries resources and the spread of the understanding of sustainability. The civilian coast guard was formed in 1997, and local governments gained some control over local police in 1998.

The 1990s saw a sharp increase in crab fishing, to fill demand created by the collapse of the Chesapeake Bay crab fishery.

In the 1990s, fish pens began to be used for milkfish in the Lingayen Gulf (bordering the provinces of Pangasinan and La Union) and other shallow marine areas. These pens usually ranged between 450 square metres (4,800 sq ft) and 2,400 square metres (26,000 sq ft). This developed into fish cage farming, which spread further, being able to be used both in inland rivers and in coastal marine water. Fish cages were imported from Norway in 1996. Imports from the United States could be used in deeper water and were installed off the east coast. Milkfish continued to dominate aquaculture throughout this period, being able to be farmed across varied environmental conditions. After conflict arose between fish farmers and artisanal fishermen in Pangasinan, due to conflicts over space the environmental damage of supplemental fish farm feeding, 95% of the 3,000 fish pens and cages in Pangasinan were dismantled in 1997 following an Executive Order from President Fidel V. Ramos.

Aquaculture expansion began receiving significant financial support from the government and multilateral organizations in the 1990s, as wild fish stocks decreased. Overall marine landings were relatively flat from 1991 to 1995. Despite absolute growth, production per capita when compared to the national population decreased by around 20% in the 1990s. Continued population growth led to increasing demand for seafood. Combined with decreasing fish catch, average consumption of seafood fell during the 1990s. Per capita consumption declined from around 40 kilograms (88 lb) in 1987 to 24 kilograms (53 lb) in 1996. During the 1997 Asian financial crisis, the fishery industry expanded despite most industries contracting.

In the mid-1990s, intensive shrimp farming methods were applied to milkfish when the rapid shift to industrial shrimp ponds led to market oversaturation and the spread of disease. Artificial feeding of milkfish became more common. Supplemental milkfish feed was often provided by companies that had previously produced shrimp feed, and so commercially produced feed began to replace the use of waste rice material. A Korean company built a shellfish processing plant in Capiz in 1995, specifically targeted at exporting mussels and oysters.

Aquaculture grew 5.42% annually in the decade leading to 1997, while commercial fisheries expanded 4.47% annually. This offset a 1.54% annual decrease in municipal fisheries production. In 1995, the Philippines was the twelfth-largest fish producer and fourth-largest aquaculture producer. Tuna overtook shrimp as the largest export product, with seaweed being third. Overall marine landings were relatively flat from 1991 to 1995. In 1997, the fisheries sector provided 15% of agricultural gross value added. Aquaculture produced 957,546 million tons, which was 34.6% of overall fisheries output and worth PhP 27,400 million. At this time, 68% of all freshwater fish ponds were in Central Luzon. As of 1995, oyster farms covered 227.98 hectares (563.4 acres) and mussel farms covered 381.22 hectares (942.0 acres). Both had stable levels of production over the decade prior.

From 1985 to 1998, fisheries contributed an average of 3.5% of GDP (an increasing absolute value as overall GDP expanded). In 1998, it was 2.7% (17.6% of agricultural activities), while providing 3% of employment, of which 68% was from manpower-intensive municipal fisheries, 26% from aquaculture, and 6% from commercial fishing. The Aquaculture and Fisheries Modernization Act of 1997 (RA 8435) was issued as an attempt to improve fisheries financing.

=== The Fisheries Code of 1998 ===
In 1998, fisheries laws were entirely overhauled through Republic Act 8550 (the Fisheries Code of 1998), which replaced all former laws and became the basis of further legislation going forward. The Fisheries Code of 1998 assigned management of these municipal waters fully to local governments, with the intention that their exploitation be mostly restricted to the residents of their municipality. Following the fisheries code, trawling was treated as banned throughout all municipal waters. The code also reinforced the concept of integrated coastal management, the importance of local management, and the inclusion of community stakeholders in fisheries management. The legal debate around commercial fishing was clarified, assigning jurisdiction to local governments who could allow boats up to 50 GT to fish from 10.1 kilometres (6.3 mi) off their shores. Also under the Fisheries Code of 1998, the formation of Fisheries and Aquatic Resources Management Councils (FARMCs) was mandated, providing local engagement in municipal lawmaking.

The FLA fishpond land lease system of 25 years renewable to 50 years was preserved in the Philippine Fisheries Code of 1998, as was the ban on the permanent sale of government land used for fish ponds, although the maximum area was decreased to 250 hectares (620 acres) for corporations. In 1998, the first commercial farming of tilapia able to survive in brackish water took place in Negros Occidental, in this case a hybrid of Mozambique tilapia and Oreochromis urolepis hornorum. Tilapia farming began to replace milkfish farming.

The fisheries code also included general provision for closed seasons to protect target species. The Visayan Sea closed season was reissued through Fisheries Administrative Order 167 in 1989, although this order was suspended from 1990 to 1992. The fisheries code also saw the creation of the National Fisheries Research and Development Institute under BFAR. The Philippine Council for Agriculture, Aquatic, and Natural Resources Research and Development provides some research funding and coordination on behalf of the Department of Science and Technology and the Bureau of Agricultural Research (under the Department of Agriculture.

As of 1998, the 2,791,163 MT of fisheries output was roughly evenly divided, with commercial fisheries producing 33.7% of total catch, municipal fisheries 31.9%, and aquaculture 34.4%. Commercial fisheries were concentrated in the Visayan Sea and waters near west and southeast of Palawan, which together produced over half of all commercial output. At this time 22.2% of commercial catch caught by the 3,216 registered vessels was roundscad, and 17.4% was Indian sardines. Municipal fisheries were more diverse, with the most common frigate tuna and fimbriated sardines together equalling 12.8% of municipal catch.

In August 1999, six tuna fishing associations formed the Soccsksargen Federation of Fishing Associations and Allied Industries (SFFAAI). Two tuna processing associations from General Santos joined in 2000. SFFAAI pushed the government to more actively participate in the establishment of the Western and Central Pacific Fisheries Commission, which led to the commission exempting traditional fishing boats from stringent monitoring requirements. It also encouraged the signing of bilateral deals for fishing access with neighboring countries. The Philippine Confederation of Tuna Industries was formed in 2000 to include tuna industry participants from the rest of the country. The National Tuna Industry Council was established by the government in 2000 to coordinate with the industry body.

The use of artificial reefs was banned in 1997, before being reallowed in 2001 under new guidelines. By the 2000s, overfishing in some areas was severe enough that catches with hook-and-line techniques were 1/20th of what they were in the 1940s for the same amount of effort. Integrated coastal management came into increasing use by local governments, within which fisheries are considered as part of a wider system, notably alongside marine protected areas. Integrated coastal management was officially adopted as a national strategy in 2006. Both integrated coastal management and ecosystem-based fisheries management were amended into the Fisheries Code of 1998 through Republic Act 10654 of 2014.

The non-native whiteleg shrimp was first imported in 1978, although production was unsuccessful. Successful breeding followed the illegal import of this shrimp in 1997, declared as milkfish fry to circumvent the ban on live shrimp imports. Continued illegal shipments may have contributed to the spread of disease, and despite a government ban on the species' production, the Philippines became a major producer of whiteleg shrimp. with production increasing from 2,000 MT in 2008 to 19,000 MT in 2019. (Production of the native jumbo tiger shrimp was stable at almost 50,000 MT during this time.)

From 1980 to 2010, capture fisheries were dominant. Since this time, aquaculture has since increased in relative prominence. This is despite aquaculture production levelling off and slightly declining starting around 2010. In 2012, around 1,614,000 people were employed in municipal fisheries. Municipal capture fisheries produced 51% of total capture fisheries production. Aquaculture produced an estimated PhP 92.3 billion of products. The most farmed product was seaweed, which accounted for 70% of all produce. The 1.75 million MT of farmed seaweed produced made the country the world's third-largest producer. Aside from seaweed, marine production made up 5% of produce, with brackish water and freshwater making up 12.5% each. There were 790,900 tonnes of fish produced, making up 25.4% of all fish production. The most farmed animals were milkfish, tilapia, and jumbo tiger shrimp. In total, the balance of fishery-related imports and exports saw a surplus of exports of PHP30.07 billion.

In 2010, around 1 million were employed in fisheries and half a million in aquaculture. In the 2010s the National Inland Fisheries Enhancement Program was begun by BFAR to rehabilitate 16 lakes, securing fish stocks and biodiversity. As of 2012, around 1,614,000 people were employed in municipal fisheries, 16,500 in commercial fisheries, and 226,000 in aquaculture. Of the 3.1 million tons of fish produced, 790,900 (25.4%) came from aquaculture. In addition, 1.8 million tonnes of seaweed was produced. Exports reached $1.2 billion in 2013, in large part due to tuna and shrimp exports. Seafood products worth $264 million were imported. From 2008 to 2015, there was an expansion in value-added sardine processing in Zamboanga, with a 94% increase in workers over that time. The closure of an area of international waters in the Pacific Ocean known as high seas pocket 1, located between Indonesia, Palau, the Federated States of Micronesia, and Papua New Guinea, caused some damage to the Philippine tuna industry. The Philippines lobbied for its reopening, which occurred in 2012 when 36 vessels were granted access.

Enforcement of the Visayan Sea closed season became strict in 2012, following a 24% decline in catch from 2010 to 2011. A closed season was established near the Zamboanga Peninsula (the East Sulu Sea, Basilan Strait, and Sibuguey Bay) in 2011 through joint Administrative Order No. 1 of the Department of Agriculture and the Department of the Interior and Local Government. The closure in Zamboanga has seen catches increase, however there is so far no evidence for the impact of the closure in the Visayan Sea. The duration of the Visayan sea closed season was reduced from four months to three in 2013 due to low compliance. Sardine conservation from December 1 to March 1 was reaffirmed in BFAR Administrative Circular 255 in 2014. Also in 2014, joint DA-DILG Administrative Order 2 established a June 1 to August 31 closed season in the Davao Gulf to protect small pelagic species. In 2015, a closed season was implemented to product roundscad around the Calamian Islands from November 1 to January 31 through joint DA-DILG Administrative Order 1. There is a similar policy in the Cagayan River to protect lobed river mullet, which was established through Fisheries Administrative Order 31 of 1952. The closure in the Davao Gulf is targeted at commercial fishing, allowing employees on commercial ships to fish in smaller boats during the closure period.

Municipal fisheries and aquaculture combined produced 73% of all catch from 2011 to 2020. From 2012 to 2021, aquaculture was far more productive than municipal fisheries, whose productivity was in turn slightly higher than that of commercial fisheries. In terms of value the difference was not as large. In 2013, aquaculture made up 41% of fisheries production. From 2013 to 2022, aquaculture production by volume has fluctuated slightly, although its value increased. During that same period, the overall volume of commodities produced from municipal fisheries decreased from 1.26 million metric tons to 1.13 million metric tons. However, the value of produced commodities increased from PhP 80.90 billion to PhP 127.63 billion.

In 2019, the Philippines produced 2.07% of global fisheries commodities (including fish, shellfish, and aquatic plants), the eighth largest amount in the world. This included a 1.01% share of non-plant aquaculture production (858.28 thousand metric tons), and a 4.19% share of global plant aquaculture production (1.50 million metric tons). The production of seaweed through aquaculture grew from 707.0 thousand tonnes in 2000 to around 1,500 thousand tonnes annually in the years since then.

=== Fisheries Management Areas ===
BFAR issued Fisheries Administrative Order 263 (FAO 263) in 2019, dividing Philippine waters into 12 Fisheries Management Areas taking into account geography and fish stock distribution. Under this system, each area is expected to have its own management body and scientific advisory group, which will prepare a Fisheries Management Area Plan that is responsive to the needs of that fishing management area. Following the annexation of Benham Rise, it was announced this territory would become a special fisheries management area. In addition to creating more tailored sustainability plans, the FMAs are intended to improve governance and the enforcement of fishery laws and regulations. Implementation of the new FMAs lagged behind the laws. By mid-2021, 11 FMAs had been established, although only 6 of the originally 12 FMAs had established scientific advisory groups, and funding and reporting structures were still undefined. Some of these delays were caused by the COVID-19 pandemic in the Philippines. The pandemic with its reduction in enforcement activities also saw an increase in IUU fishing in municipal waters. BFAR and USAID released tools to allow local communities to estimate the prevalence of IUU fishing in their local waters. By 2022, all 12 management boards had been organized, and 11 scientific advisory groups had been set up.

In 2020, fisheries made up 1.52% of GDP. There was US$1.00 billion in fisheries-related exports and US$592.36 million in imports. One-fifth of exports went to the United States, with other large markets being Japan, Germany, China, Spain, Italy, the United Kingdom, the Netherlands, South Korea, and Vietnam. Two thirds of exports by both volume and value are tuna, seaweed, shrimp, and prawns. Canned tuna makes up the majority of tuna exports, while carrageenan makes up 94% of seaweed exports. Shrimp exports are 90% frozen produce, mostly going to Japan, the United States, and South Korea. Other exports include crab, octopus, grouper, cuttlefish, squid, ornamental fish, roundscad, and sea cucumber. Of fishery-related imports, over 40% of imports were tuna, with other imports including mackerel, sardines, and prawn and other fish feed. A quarter of imports come from China, one-fifth from Papua New Guinea, and one-eighth from Vietnam, with other sources including Japan, Taiwan, South Korea, Thailand, and Nauru. Domestically, fisheries-related products made up 11.68% of all nutritional intake. This average of 93.9 grams each day consumed was less than that of rice but more than red meat and poultry. Annual average consumption was 23.36 kilograms (51.5 lb) of fresh fish, 4.97 kilograms (11.0 lb) of processed fish, 2.85 kilograms (6.3 lb) of dried fish, and 3.10 kilograms (6.8 lb) of shellfish. 2020 saw 2,078,913 people involved in some stage of the fishing industry, of which 1,029,963 (~50%) were involved in capture fishery. 247,021 (~12%) were involved in gleaning, and 233,725 (~11%) in aquaculture. In 2022 those working in fisheries increased to 2,302,648.

Due to the decrease of sardine populations and their importance to coastal communities, a National Sardines Management Plan was signed by Agriculture Secretary William Dar in May 2020 following the recommendation of the National Fisheries and Aquatic Resources Management Council. Due to the establishment of the FMAs, the Sardine plan is expected to be integrated into individual FMA plans that are then adopted by LGUs. By September 2021, there were calls for FMA 7 to adopt the plan. By December 2021, FMA 7 was the only FMA that had adopted the plan.

In 2021, fisheries produced 4.25 million metric tons (PhP 302.44 billion): 2.25 million metric tons (52.88%) from aquaculture, 1.13 million metric tons (26.64%) from municipal fisheries, and 0.87 million metric tons (20.48%) from commercial fisheries. The most produced item was seaweed (1.34 million metric tons, or 31.63% of all fisheries production), followed by tuna (10.88%), milkfish (10.51%), sardines (8.75%), and tilapia (8.00%). USD 1,137.29 million worth of products were exported, 60% of which was tuna, seaweed, and crabs, and US$746.45 million was imported. Nationally, 2.19 million people were employed in municipal fishing activities, of which 50.03% were in capture fisheries, 11.59% in gleaning activities, and 11.28% in aquaculture. Other fish processing and municipal fishing-related activities employed 189,562 people. There were 923 licensed commercial vessel operators. Bangsamoro produced the most aquaculture products by volume, although in terms of value aquaculture in other regions produced more. Domestic consumption in 2021 was 34.28 kilograms (75.6 lb): 23.34 kilograms (51.5 lb) of fresh fish, 3.89 kilograms (8.6 lb) of processed fish, 2.86 kilograms (6.3 lb) of dried fish, 2.88 kilograms (6.3 lb) of shellfish, and 1.31 kilograms (2.9 lb) other.

In 2022, there were 2,302,648 fisherfolk registered with BFAR, of which 50.96% were in capture fisheries, 11.27% in aquaculture, 11.18% in gleaning, 6.83% in vending, and 1.96% in processing. Of these registered fisherfolk, 70% were men and 30% were women. Most are older: 9% are 30 or below, with 21.13% aged 31 to 40, 22.97% aged 51 to 60, and 24.42% older than that. Overall production was 4.34 million metric tons worth PhP 326.57 billion, of which aquaculture produced 2.35 million metric tons (54.15%), municipal fisheries 1.13 million metric tons (25.96%), and commercial fisheries 862,686.35 metric tons (19.89%). More than half of commercial fisheries products were landed in Region XII and Region IX combined. There were 5,090 registered commercial fishing vessels under 1,004 registered operators. Of these vessels, 45.66% were small-scale, 48.39% medium-scale, and 5.97% large-scale. Over half of the operators were registered in Metro Manila. 375,995 municipal fishing vessels registered with local governments.

There were 2.35 million metric tons of aquaculture products created in the Philippines, 54.15% of all fisheries products in the Philippines, with a total value of around PhP 124.00 billion. The biggest commodity by volume was seaweed, which with 1,544,959.98 metric tons made up 65.8% of aquaculture production. The largest environment for aquaculture aside from seaweed farms was brackish ponds, followed by freshwater ponds and marine cages. By product type, the second largest by volume and highest by value was milkfish, of which 184,162.33 metric tons (47.47%) were produced in fish ponds and 180,290.27 metric tons (46.47%) were produced in fish cages. Tilapia was third by volume and third by value, with 77.19% of these tilapia being farmed in fish ponds. Shrimp was fourth by volume and second by value, with the most produced and most valuable shrimp being jumbo tiger shrimp. Seaweed farms produced the fourth-most value, PhP 16.60 billion, being sold for much less than some other fishery products per unit weight.

Large volumes of seaweed production meant Bangsamoro was the region producing the most aquaculture products, with its 1,042,064.26 metric tons being 97.95% seaweed (66.07% of national seaweed production). The region producing the most value from aquaculture however was Region III, which produced 300,345.65 metric tons worth over PhP 40 billion. Much of this was tilapia, which made up 48.61% of Region III's production by volume and 28.25% by value. The value of Bangsamoro's aquaculture products was PhP 11.57 billion.

In 2022, PHP 66.07 billion (US$1.21 billion) of fisheries-related products were exported, while PHP 50.14 billion (US$920.46 million) were imported. Most exports were tuna, seaweed, and crab, which together made up 58.36% of exports by volume and 69.61% by value. Other exports include eel, octopus, grouper, milkfish, shrimp, cuttlefish, and sardines. Tuna exports were 106,923 MT worth US$403.51 million. Seaweed exports were 48,491 MT, exported to the United States, the Netherlands, Spain, Germany, and China. Crab exports were 9,156 MT worth US$91,440. While crab exports by volume were mostly fresh or chilled crabs, crab products provided higher value. The main export markets for crabs were Hong Kong, China, the United States, and Taiwan. The main import providers were China, Vietnam, and Papua New Guinea. Per unit weight, exports were of much higher value than imports.

=== Marine Protected Areas ===
Another avenue of sustainable fishery management is through Marine Protected Areas (MPAs). While many of the previously discussed Fisheries Management Areas (FMAs) are MPAs, not all of them are. In the Philippines, since the establishment of the first MPA in 1974, there are currently over 1,800 implemented MPAs, most of which are locally managed. Policies such as the National Integrated Protected Area Systems Act of 1992 lays the groundwork for National MPA implementation, while policies such as the Fisheries Code of 1998 establish a framework for locally managed MPAs. Locally managed MPAs are established in local municipalities by the Local Government Units (LGUs) in collaboration with the community through participatory bodies such as Fisheries and Aquatic Resource Management Councils (FARMCs) and People Organizations (POs). Both FARMCs and POs often consist of fishermen collectives, private sector stakeholders, and interested community members. However, a FARMC is created by the LGU, and POs are created by NGOs. The Philippines Fisheries Code of 1998 requires collaboration between LGUs, FARMCs, and POs to ensure the implementation and management of the local fisheries is equitable and participatory. These actors together form the MPA management plans for their local fisheries which include varying rules, limitations, and monitoring/enforcement procedures. Marine Protected Areas have shown to be successful in protecting and conserving marine resources, increasing fish stocks, and protecting threatened coral reefs. MPAs have been increasingly implemented as an intervention for coral reef and fishery restoration in the Philippines due to the devastation of many coral and marine ecosystems by dynamite fishing, cyanide fishing, overfishing by large-scale fisheries, and more.
