= Sampaloc =

Sampáloc is the Tagalog word sampalok (tamarind) rendered in Spanish orthography. It is the name of certain locations in the Philippines:

- Sampaloc, Manila
- Sampaloc, Quezon
- Lake Sampaloc
