= Lake Tikub =

Lake in the Philippines

- Location within the Philippines
- Location: Luzon
- Coordinates: 13°57′46″N 121°18′23″E
- Type: crater lake; maar
- Max. length: 0.82 kilometres (0.51 mi)
- Max. width: 0.73 kilometres (0.45 mi)
- Surface area: 120 hectares (300 acres)
- Max. depth: 75 metres (246 ft)
- Surface elevation: 97 metres (318 ft)
- Settlements: Tiaong

Lake Tikub (also known as Lake Ticub, Lake Ticob, Lake Tikob or Lake Ticab) is a nearly circular crater lake located in the province of Quezon, in the Philippines. The circumference of the lake is elevated and thick with foliage that steeply slopes down to the shore of the lake. The lake is located at the foot of Mount Malepunyo, and nearby is Mount Banahaw, in Brgy. Ayusan, in the town of Tiaong. Access to the lake is through Brgy. San Pedro.

== Geology ==
Lake Tikub is a maar or a low-profile volcano created by phreatomagmatic eruption or the interaction between groundwater and magma underneath the Earth's surface. Like the seven lakes of San Pablo, Laguna, which is about 15 kilometres (9.3 mi) away, the lake is one of the monogenetic volcanoes located in the Laguna Volcanic Field.
