= Lake Lumao =

- Location within the Philippines
- Location: Agusan del Sur
- Coordinates: 8°26′40″N 125°46′23″E
- Type: lake
- Primary inflows: Agusan River
- Basin countries: Philippines
- Surface area: 16.8 km^{2} (6.5 sq mi)

Lake Lumao is a lake located in the Agusan Valley in the province of Agusan del Sur, Philippines. The Agusan River is its main tributary.

With an area of about 1,680 hectares (4,200 acres), it is the tenth-largest lake in the Philippines.
