= Lake Calibato =

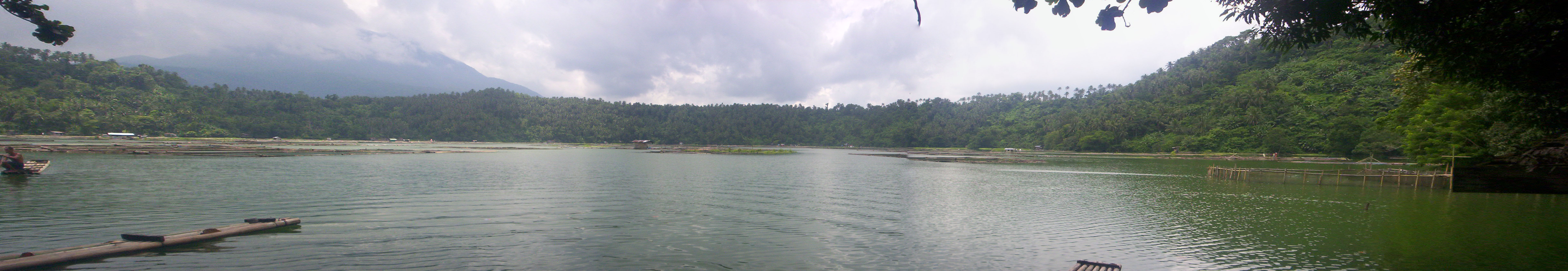
- Panorama of the lake

- Location within the Philippines
- Location: Laguna
- Group: Seven Lakes of San Pablo
- Coordinates: 14°6′12″N 121°22′40″E
- Type: crater lake
- Surface area: 42 ha (100 acres)
- Average depth: 135 m (443 ft)
- Water volume: approx. 29,600 cubic metres (1,050,000 cu ft)
- Settlements: San Pablo City

Lake Calibato, also spelled Kalibato, is one of the seven crater lakes collectively called Pitong Lawa or Seven Lakes of San Pablo in Laguna province in the Philippines. The lake is situated in Brgy. Sto. Angel in San Pablo City. Calibato has an area of 42 hectares (100 acres) and maximum depth of 135 metres (443 ft). Calibato's maximum water capacity is approximately 29,600 cubic metres (1,050,000 cu ft). It supplies the city and nearby towns with abundant fish and aquatic plants. The lake is the deepest recorded lake among the seven-lake system; no recorded depths are available for Muhikap.

== Legend ==
It was told that the area was once a valley inhabited by a Diwata (benevolent fairy or nymph) who had wanted to keep her realm free from the intrusion of mankind. Thus, she was angered when people built rocky pathways that criss-crossed her valley. She then caused a strong earthquake and severe storm that transformed her valley into a lagoon.

The villagers living in the surrounding hills were awestruck the following morning, and named the body of water Lake Calibato, taken from the criss-crossing stone pathways of the valley, a portmanteau of Cali (corrupted from the Spanish calle, "street") and the Tagalog Bato ("rock").
