= Lake Dasay =

Lake in Zamboanga del Sur, Philippines

- Location within the Philippines
- Location: Zamboanga del Sur
- Coordinates: 7°39′43″N 123°15′11″E
- Basin countries: Philippines
- Surface area: 40 hectares (99 acres)
- Surface elevation: 230 metres (750 ft)
- Settlements: San Miguel

Lake Dasay is the second largest mountain lake, after Lake Wood, in the province of Zamboanga del Sur, Philippines. With an elevation of about 230 metres (750 ft), it covers a 40-hectare (99-acre) area surrounded by forestland and is located in the town of San Miguel.
