= Lake Mohicap =

- Location within the Philippines
- Location: Laguna
- Group: Seven Lakes of San Pablo
- Coordinates: 14°7′19″N 121°20′4″E
- Type: crater lake
- Max. length: 530 m (1,740 ft)
- Max. width: 490 m (1,610 ft)
- Surface area: 14.5 hectares (36 acres)
- Surface elevation: 80 metres (260 ft)
- Settlements: San Pablo City

Lake Mohicap (also spelled as Mojicap or Muhikap) is one of the seven lakes of San Pablo City, in the province of Laguna, Philippines. The lake, located in Brgy. San Buenaventura, has an area of 14.5 hectares (36 acres) and is one of the main suppliers of water in the city. The waters of San Pablo Lakes provide a generous source of tilapia for Metro Manila and suburbs.

== Legend ==
The legend of Lake Mohicap is quite similar to those of Lakes Pandin and Yambo to the east. A couple once had a very sickly daughter named Munica, and frequently prayed to God for her health, vowing to do anything in return. God answered their prayer, but on condition that Munica’s feet must never touch soil. She thus grew to be healthy and very industrious.

One day as her parents were away, Munica was sewing a dress. Her ball of thread fell to the ground, and when she tried retrieving it, she fainted and fell. Munica and the neighbourhood suddenly sank into the earth, and a lagoon formed in the area. The body of water was called “Mohicap”, combining the unfortunate girl’s name and mahikap, meaning “industrious” in the local dialect of Tagalog.

== See also ==
- List of lakes of the Philippines
