= Deogracias Villadolid =

Filipino biologist

- Born: Deogracias Villamin Villadolid; March 22, 1896; Nasugbu, Batangas, Captaincy General of the Philippines
- Died: 1976 (aged 80)
- Education: University of the Philippines College of Agriculture; Stanford University
- Known for: Introducing Tilapia aquaculture and formal fisheries education in the Philippines
- Scientific career
- Fields: Fisheries science

Deogracias Villamin Villadolid was a Filipino biologist who specialized in fisheries science. He is known for introducing formal fisheries education in the Philippines as well as for pioneering tilapia aquaculture in the country.

== Early life and education ==
Born to a middle-class family in Nasugbu, Batangas on March 22, 1896, Deogracias Villadolid attended the University of the Philippines College of Agriculture (UPCA) in Los Baños, Laguna where he earned three degrees; Bachelor of Agriculture (1919), Bachelor of Science in agriculture (1923), and Master of Science in agriculture (1923).

Villadolid after attending UPCA went to the United States to attend Stanford University in Palo Alto, California, where he earned a doctorate in philosophy, a major in marine biology and a minor in aquatic botany in 1927.

== Career ==
Upon returning to the Philippines after his studies in the United States, Villadolid was employed by UPCA as an instructor where he designed a course of instructions on biology of aquatic fauna and flora, particularly fishes, limnology, phycology and a general fisheries program. His contribution would later be adopted as part of the College of Agriculture's wider program.

Villadolid was given a position at the then-newly formed Fish and Game Administration of the Department of Agriculture, where he had American ichthyologist Albert William Herre, known for his discovery of Pandaka pygmaea, as his colleague.

After his stint in the Fish and Game Administration, Villadolid became director of the Bureau of Fisheries. During the Japanese occupation of the Philippines, during World War II, Villadolid was able to carry his duties as fisheries director. to do so even during the Japanese occupation. After the war, Villadolid was instrumental to the establishment of the Philippine Institute of Fisheries Technology (PIFT), the first fisheries school in the Philippines, in 1946. Initially the school was located in Navotas and has attracted students from other Asian countries such as Burma, India, Indonesia, Pakistan, Thailand, and Vietnam. As early as 1950, Villadolid introduced the practice of farming tilapia. He started with the Oreochromis mossambicus species of tilapia sourced from Thailand. The PIFT's ownership was transferred from the Bureau of Fisheries of the Department of Agriculture and Natural Resources to the University of the Philippines (UP) in January 1957 during the tenure of President Ramon Magsaysay. The PIFT has been reorganized as the UP College of Fisheries

As fisheries director, Villadolid sent 125 Filipino fisheries pensionados to the United States for training on deep-sea fishing. He also served as vice-chairman, and later chairman of the Indo-Pacific Fisheries Council (IPFC), and also made visits to Denmark, Japan, and the United States as part of his function.

Villadolid retired from government employment on March 22, 1961, at age 65. After his retirement, he became Vice President of the Araneta University and as dean of the university's Institute of Graduate Studies and Applied Research. He was part of Araneta University's faculty until 1966.

== Death ==
Villadolid died sometime in 1976. He was aged 80.
