= Seven Lakes of San Pablo =

Volcanic crater lakes in San Pablo, Laguna, Philippines

Map of the lakes along with surrounding major roads, rivers and streams, barangays, and the downtown of the city of San Pablo

The Seven Lakes of San Pablo (Filipino: Pitong Lawa ng San Pablo) are seven volcanic crater lakes scattered around the City of San Pablo, in the province of Laguna, Philippines.

== The Lakes ==
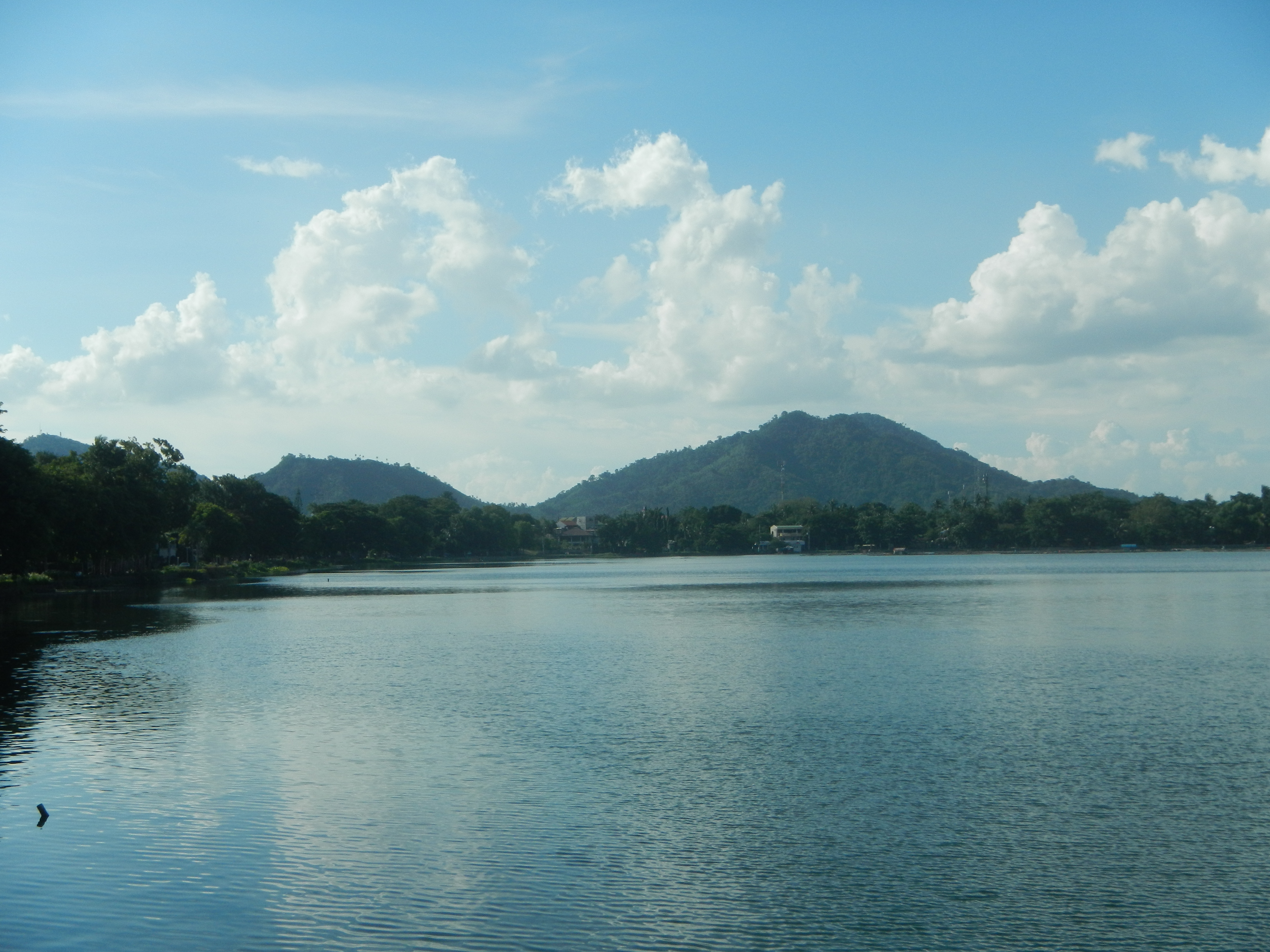
Lake Sampaloc

The canonical list of seven lakes are:

- Lake Bunot
- Lake Calibato (also Kalibato)
- The twin lakes of Yambo and Pandin
- Lake Palakpakin (Palacpaquin, Palacpaquen)
- Lake Mohicap (Mojicap, Muhikap)
- Lake Sampaloc (Sampalok), the largest lake by area.

== Geology ==
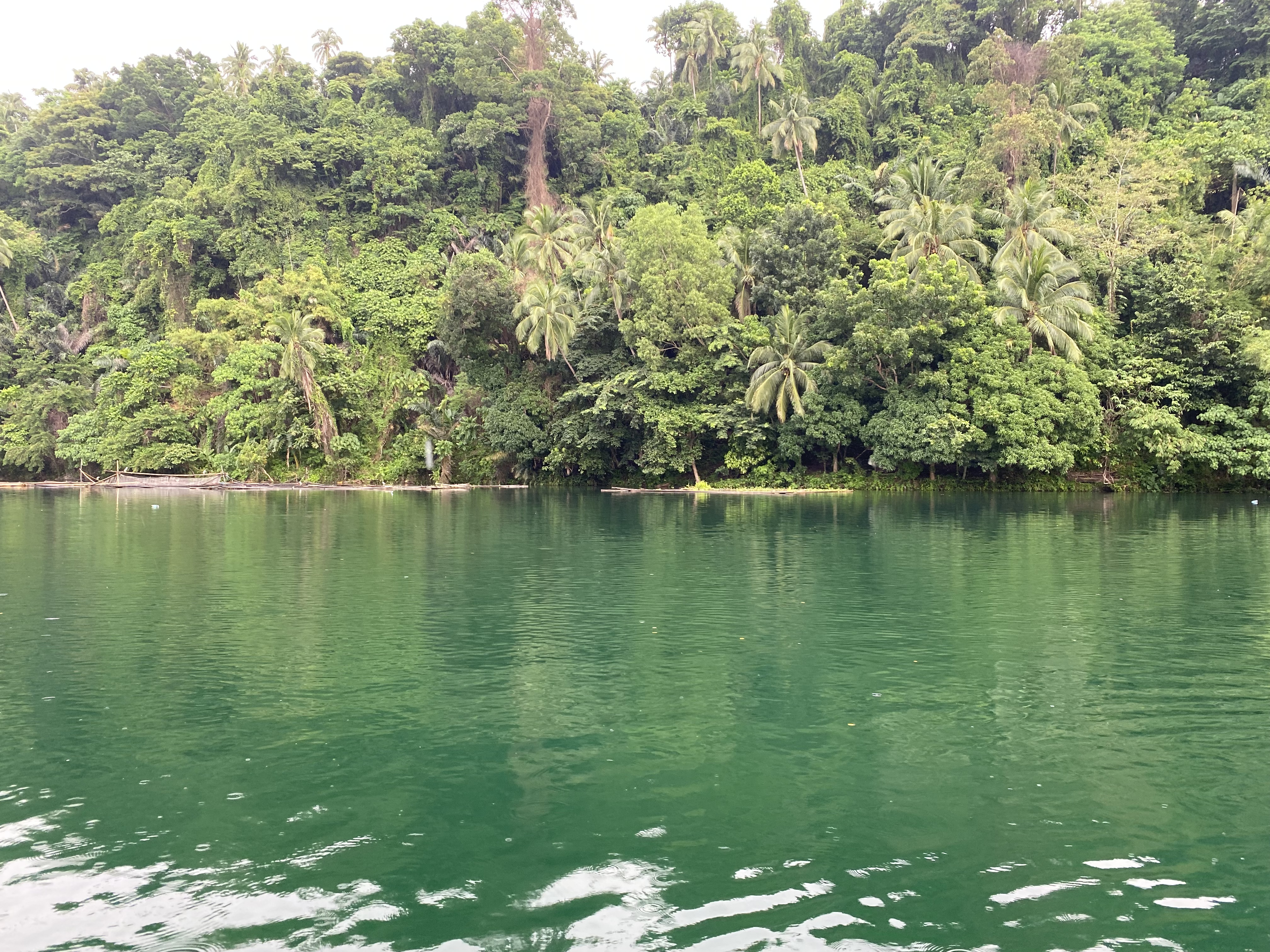
Lake Pandin

The lakes are maars or low-profile volcanic craters located in the San Pablo Volcanic Field. They are among the 200 small monogenetic volcanoes found along the Macolod Corridor, a rift zone between Mount Makiling and Mount Banahaw, which is part of the larger Southwestern Luzon Volcanic Field. These craters are formed by phreatomagmatic eruptions, an eruption where ground water comes in contact with hot magma pushing up near the Earth's surface.

== Petrographic Analysis ==
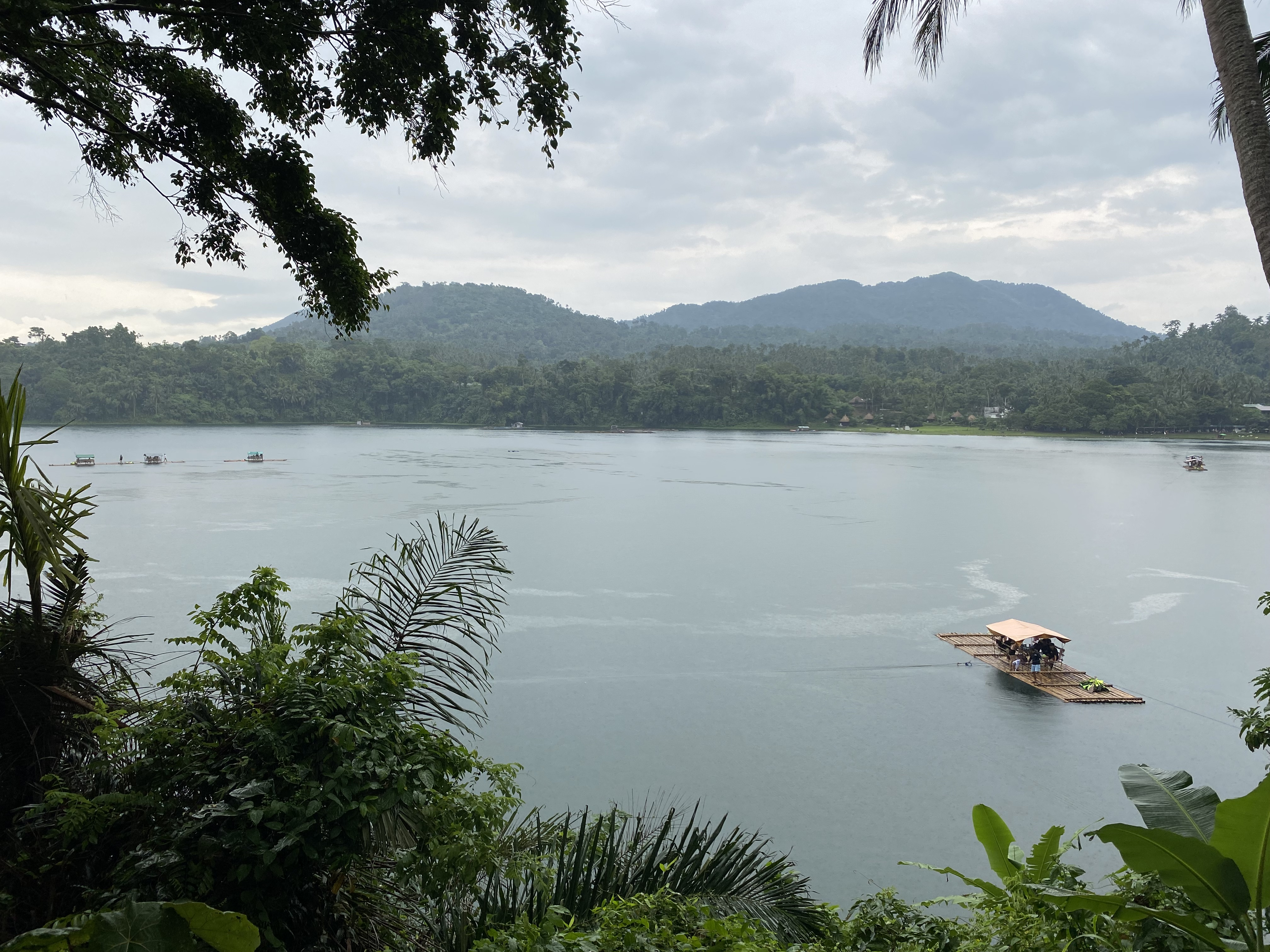
Lake Yambo

In a recent rocks and sediment analysis or petrographic study on the lakes and adjoining rivers in San Pablo, sulfate concentrations were considerably higher than the naturally occurring sulfates from volcanism. Samples were taken from other areas underlain with similar volcanic rocks from the old eruptions (e.g. Taal volcano) like Indang, in the province of Cavite and the La Mesa Watershed, the water supply reservoir for Metropolitan Manila. The analyses indicated that the elevated level of sulfates were not related to volcanism but anthropogenic or man-made, and among the causes are sewage, fertilizers, herbicides, pesticides etc.

== Hiking trails ==
In 2005, the Rotary Club of San Pablo City held a ceremony that officially opened the hiking trails that connect the seven lakes of the city. The Rotarians were aiming for economic, environmental and health benefits of the trails to the community.

== Conservation ==
The lakes are threatened by human intervention and exploitation, most especially Lake Sampaloc, which is located right in the center of San Pablo. Several illegal settlements, illegal fish pens, commercial and business infrastructures on the shores have proliferated on some of the lakes causing increased pollution. Overuse of commercial fish feeds have resulted in high nitrogen levels and low dissolved oxygen that has led to fish kills in the early and late 1990s. In January 2004, fish kills were observed in six of the seven lakes. Various ecological conservation efforts by both government and non-government organizations, like the Friends of the Seven Lakes Foundation, had been implemented in recent years. One of these is the demolition of human-made structures along the lakes' shoreline.
