= Lake Palakpakin =

- Location within the Philippines
- Location: Laguna
- Group: Seven Lakes of San Pablo
- Coordinates: 14°6′36″N 121°20′24″E
- Type: crater lake
- Surface area: 43 hectares (110 acres)
- Average depth: 7.5 metres (25 ft)
- Settlements: San Pablo City

Lake Palakpakin, also spelled Palacpaquin or Palacpaquen, is one of the Seven Lakes of San Pablo in Laguna province in the Philippines. Palakpakin is located in Brgy. San Buenaventura, San Pablo City. With an area of 43 hectares (110 acres), it has a maximum depth of 7.5 metres (25 ft).

Residents around the lake rely on income from fishpens and fishcages that grow cultured tilapia and silver carp.

== Legend ==
A few kilometers north of the city proper was a village which had become known then for its ancient tree which had a hollow trunk. It was called Palakpak. Some villagers said that on moonlit nights they could see a beautiful, red-haired lady washing her long hair with the hollow trunk serving as her wash basin. There is also river nearby where a big fish appeared each night when the beautiful lady was around. The villagers would not catch it, believing that it must be her pet.

One day, a stranger came to the village and tried to solve the mystery about the red-haired lady and the fish. And so one moonlit night, he waited for her. Seeing the lady in her pristine glory, the stranger approached her. All of a sudden there was thunder and lightning. The earth quaked with terrible intensity, while the river swelled alarmingly into a lake. From that time onwards, that lake produces a large quantity of shrimps which when cooked, turned red. People since then had affectionately called their village Palakpakin, after that ancient tree and the shrimps in the lake became a principal source of livelihood, which they call Hipong Palakpakin or Palakpakin Shrimp.
