= Lakes Pandin and Yambo =

Lake Pandin
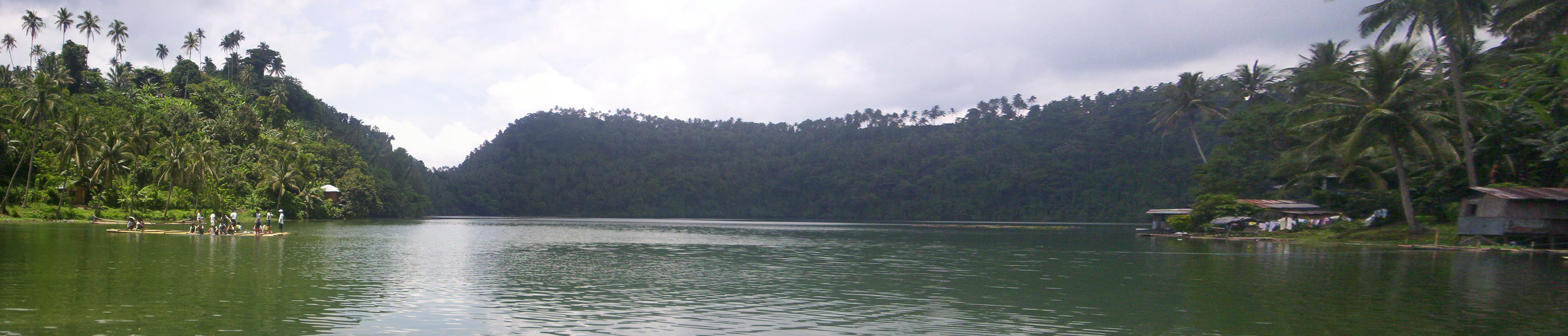
- A panoramic view of the lake

- Location within the Philippines
- Location: Laguna
- Group: Seven Lakes of San Pablo
- Coordinates: 14°6′52″N 121°22′4″E
- Lake type: crater lake
- Surface area: 20.5 ha (51 acres)
- Average depth: 63 m (207 ft)
- Settlements: San Pablo

Lake Yambo
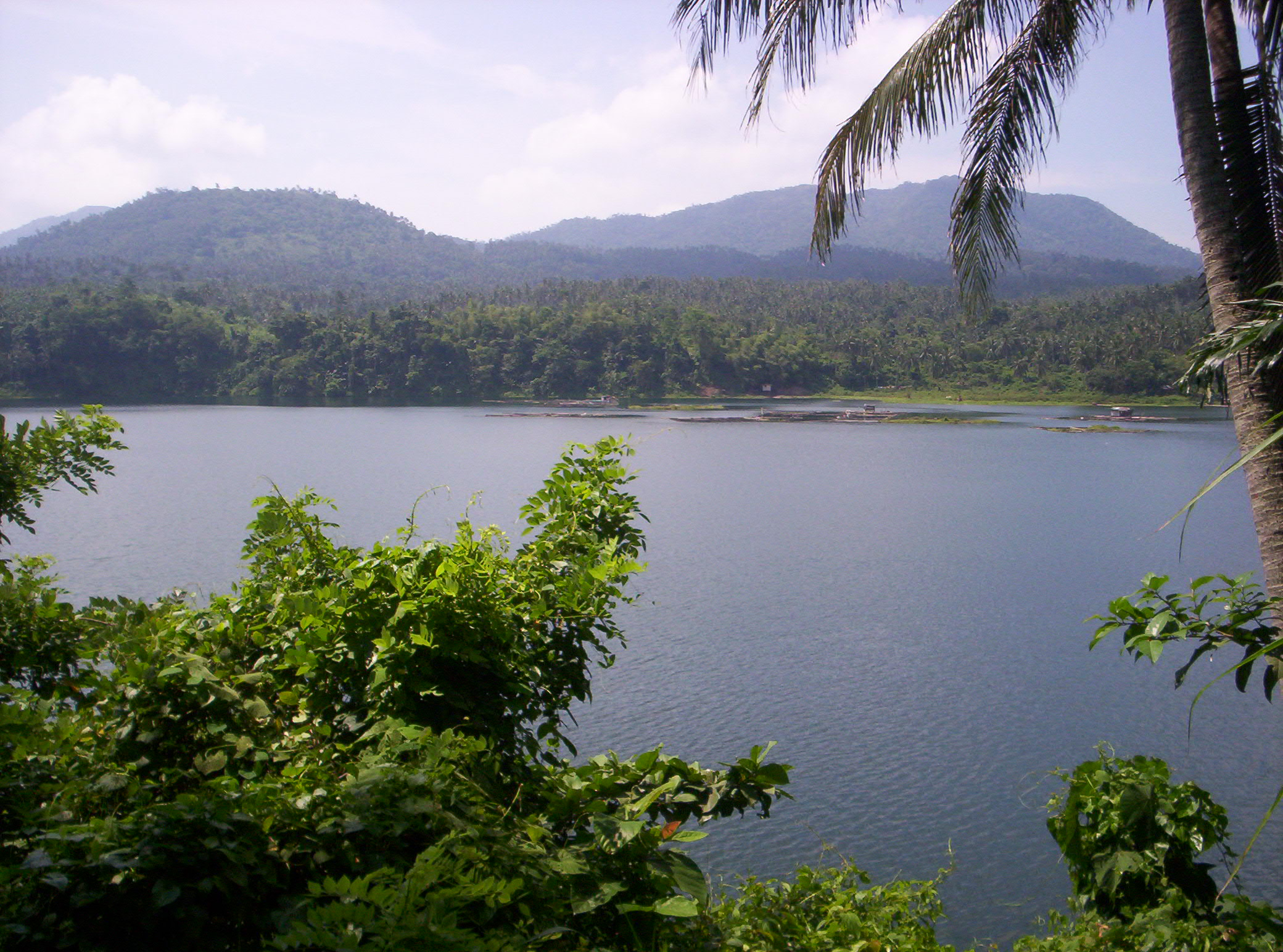
- View of the lake from the narrow strip of land separating it from Lake Pandin

- Location within the Philippines
- Location: Laguna
- Group: Seven Lakes of San Pablo
- Coordinates: 14°7′8″N 121°22′00″E
- Type: crater lake
- Surface area: 28.5 ha (70 acres)
- Average depth: 40 m (130 ft)
- Settlements: San Pablo

Pandin and Yambo are twin crater lakes separated by a narrow strip of land. They are part of the Seven Lakes system in San Pablo, and are situated at Brgy. San Lorenzo in San Pablo, Laguna.

Lake Pandin is said to be "the most pristine" of the seven lakes of San Pablo.

== Pandin Lake ==
Pandin has an area of 20.5 hectares and a maximum depth of 63 meters. It has a calculated volume of 6,600 cubic meters of water in storage.

== Yambo Lake ==
Yambo has a normal surface area of 28.5 hectares.

Yambo, like Pandin, is considered oligotrophic, and is suitable for swimming, outings, and picnics.

== Mythology ==
It was told that these two lakes were named after two lovers. A beautiful woman named Pandin was cursed that should she ever touch her feet to the earth, something terrible would befall her. Yambo, her ardent lover, did not know about this curse and had her step on the ground, causing a terrible noise followed by the cracking and grumbling of the earth. A heavy downpour made the area twin lakes, separated from each other by a bare strip of land.

== Location: Laguna ==
Group: Seven Lakes of San pablo

- The Legend of Pandin and Yambo
- San Pablo City
