= Lake Bunot =

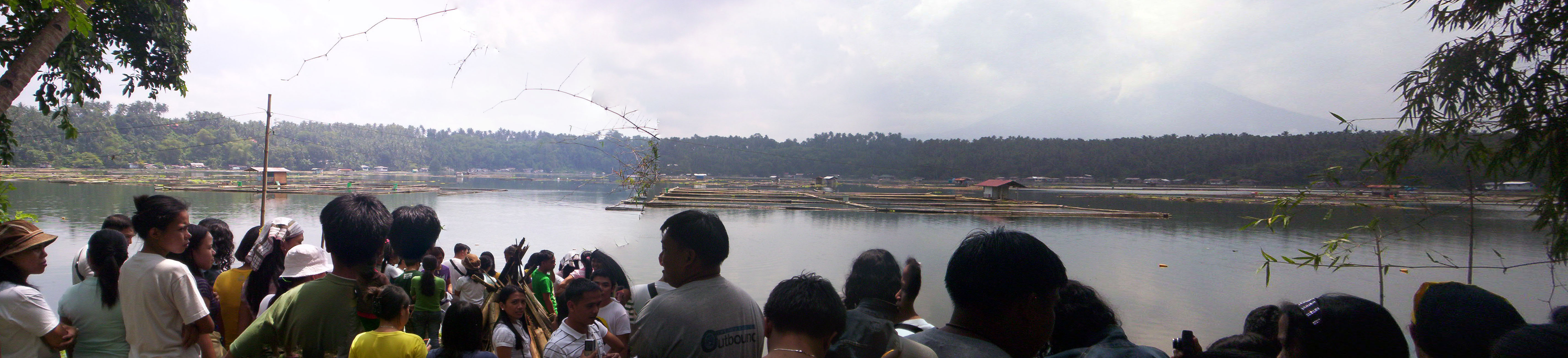
- A panoramic view of the lake

- Location within the Philippines
- Location: Laguna
- Group: Seven Lakes of San Pablo
- Coordinates: 14°4′52″N 121°20′38″E
- Lake type: crater lake
- Surface area: 30.5 ha (75 acres)
- Average depth: 23 m (75 ft)
- Settlements: San Pablo

Lake Bunot is a volcanic crater lake and is one of the Seven Lakes of San Pablo, Laguna in the Philippines. It is located in Brgy. Concepcion, San Pablo City. Only 4.5 kilometres (2.8 mi) from the city proper, Bunot is known for its cultured tilapia and fishpens for Nilotica fingerlings. Bunot has a normal surface area of 30.5 hectares (75 acres) with a maximum depth of 23 metres (75 ft).

== Legend ==
It is said that in the Spanish Era, some Spanish soldiers came upon a quiet lagoon and wanting to know its name for surveying purposes enquired such from a man husking coconuts by the lakeshore. As is common to many Philippine etymological myths, the man misunderstood the foreign soldiers as asking for the name of the coconut husk, and replied in Tagalog Bunót. The Spaniards left muttering the word, thinking that it was the name of the lake.
