= Lake Sampaloc =

Lake in Laguna, Philippines

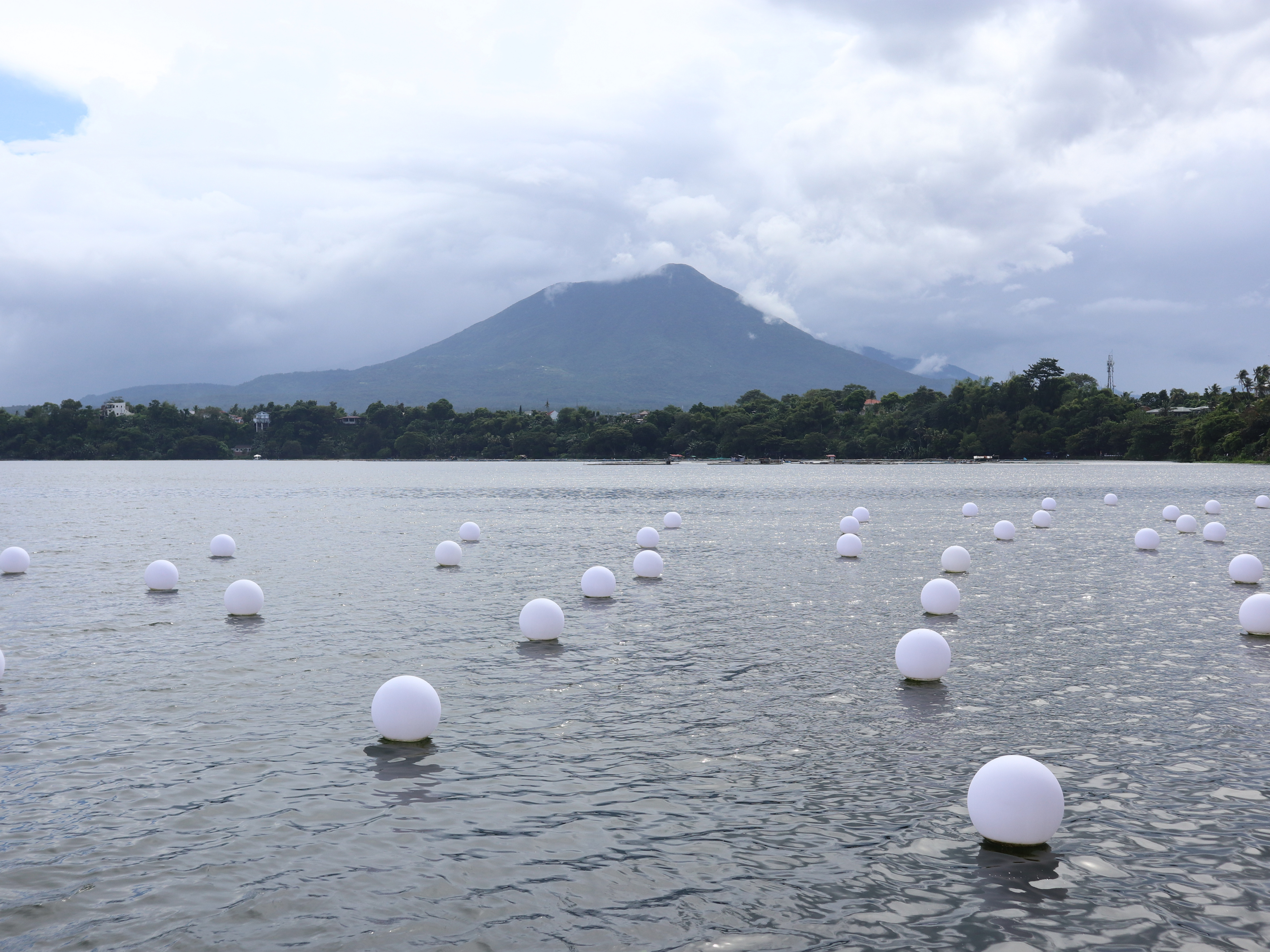
- Sampaloc Lake with Mount Banahaw in the background

- Location in the Philippines
- Location: Laguna
- Group: Seven Lakes of San Pablo
- Coordinates: 14°04′44″N 121°19′48″E
- Type: maar
- Basin countries: Philippines
- Max. width: 1.2 kilometres (0.75 mi)
- Surface area: 104 hectares (260 acres)
- Average depth: 10 metres (33 ft)
- Max. depth: 27 metres (89 ft)
- Settlements: San Pablo

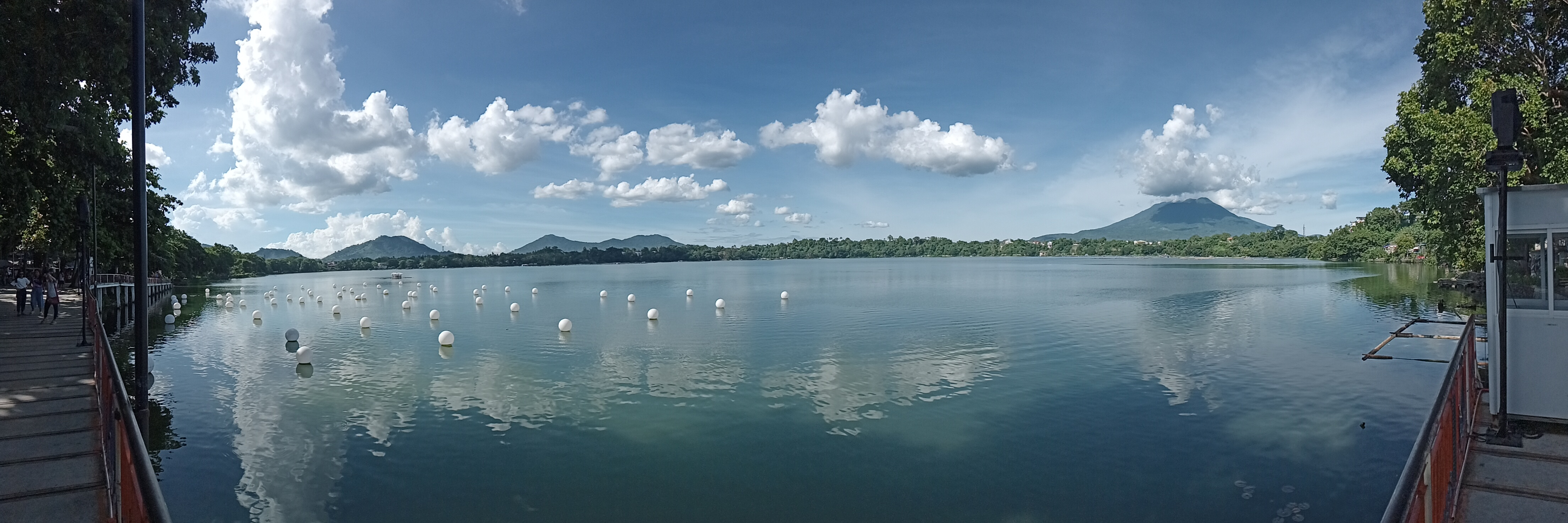
Panoramic view of Sampaloc Lake

Lake Sampaloc, also spelled Sampalok, is a volcanic crater lake in Laguna on the island of Luzon. It is the largest of the Seven Lakes of San Pablo. Nearly half of the lake's depth has a shallow depression at the bottom, indicating its volcanic origin. The lake is behind San Pablo city hall and is dotted with fishpens and small cottages built on stilts.

== Legend ==
A giant sampaloc (Tamarindus indica or tamarind tree) once grew in the garden of a selfish, stingy old woman. One day, an old man begged for some tamarind fruit as a cure for his ailing grandson. Instead of helping him, the old woman set her ferocious dogs upon him to drive him away. The old man was badly hurt. He was in fact a diwata (nymph or fairy) in disguise.

After the diwata (still appearing as the old man) had departed, there was a thundering noise and rain, followed by the cracking of the earth. The entire orchard sank into a colossal pit which was immediately filled with water, which villagers thence named after the large tamarind tree.
