= Volcanic crater lake =

Lake formed within a volcanic crater

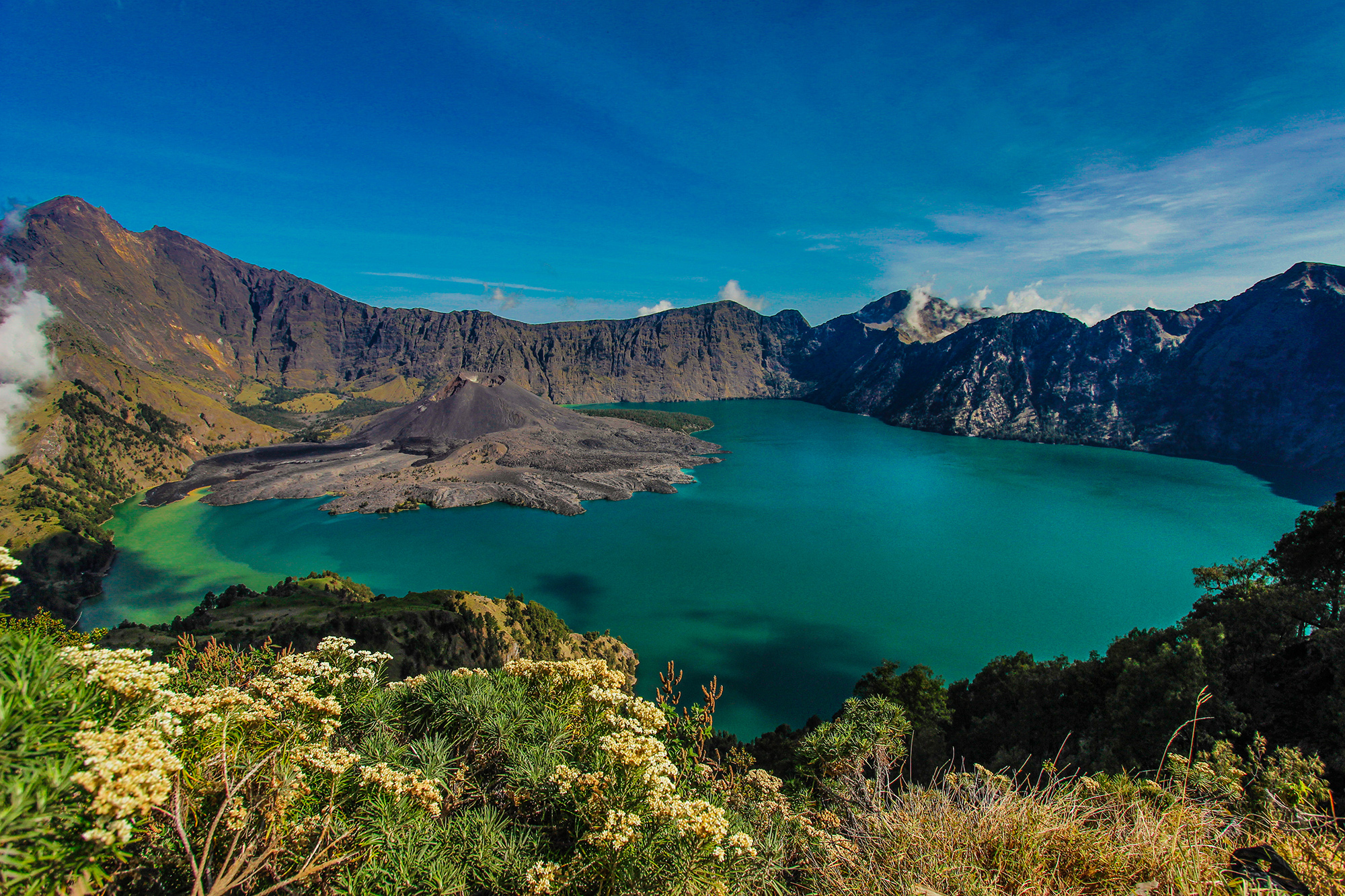
The crater lake of Mount Rinjani, Indonesia

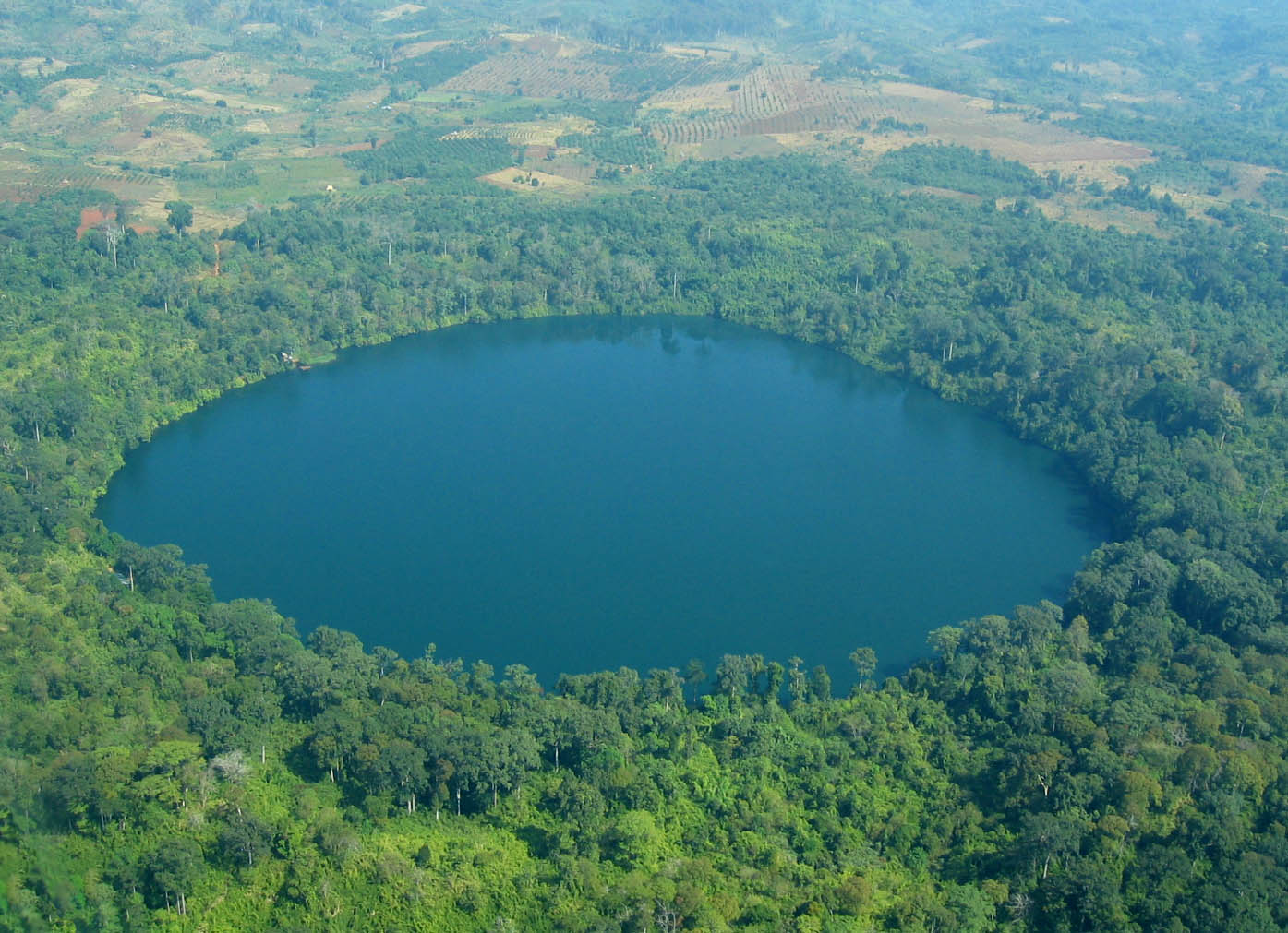
Lake Yeak Laom, Cambodia

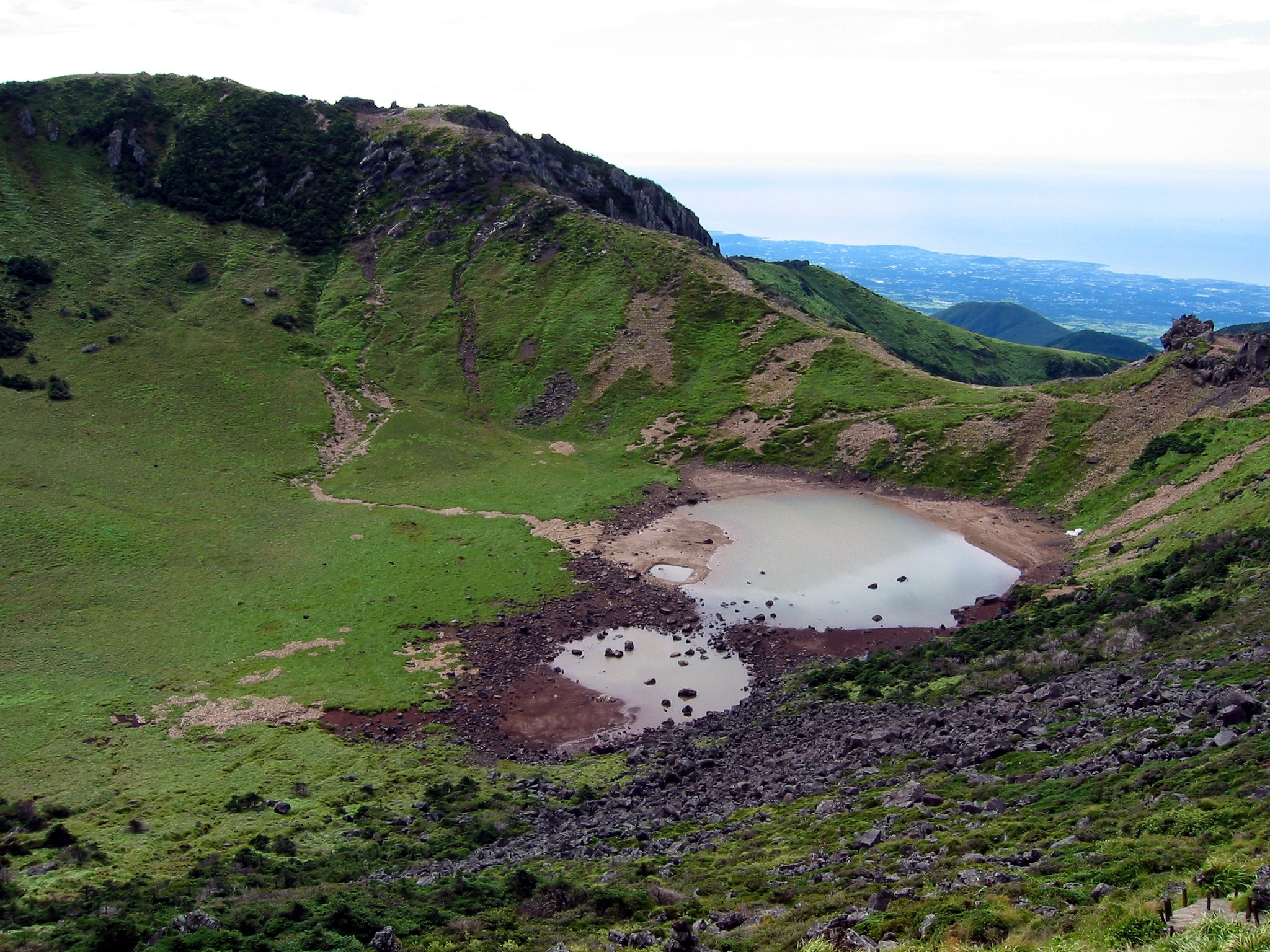
Baengnokdam crater lake of the mountain Hallasan in winter, South Korea

A volcanic crater lake, or simply crater lake, is a lake in a crater that was formed by explosive activity or a collapse during a volcanic eruption. Water from various sources accumulates in the crater to form the crater lake.

== Formation ==
Lakes in calderas fill large craters formed by the collapse of a volcano during an eruption. Rain, snow and ice melt, and groundwater accumulate in the calderas to form crater lakes. These lakes are often cold, freshwater lakes, but may also be warm and highly acidic, due to hydrothermal nature of their origin.

Lakes in maars (low-profile volcanoes, below the level of the surrounding terrain), fill medium-sized craters where an eruption deposited debris around a vent.

Crater lakes form as the created depression, within the crater rim, is filled by water. The water may come from precipitation, groundwater circulation (often hydrothermal fluids in the case of volcanic craters) or melted ice. Its level rises until an equilibrium is reached between the rates of incoming and outgoing water. Sources of water loss singly or together may include evaporation, subsurface seepage, and, in places, surface leakage or overflow when the lake level reaches the lowest point on its rim. At such a saddle location, the upper portion of the lake is contained only by its adjacent natural volcanic dam; continued leakage through or surface outflow across the dam can erode its included material, thus lowering lake level until a new equilibrium of water flow, erosion, and rock resistance is established. If the volcanic dam portion erodes rapidly or fails catastrophically, the occurrence produces a breakout or outburst flood. With changes in environmental conditions over time, the occurrence of such floods is common to all natural dam types.

These lakes may become soda lakes, many of which are associated with active tectonic and volcanic zones.

== Examples ==
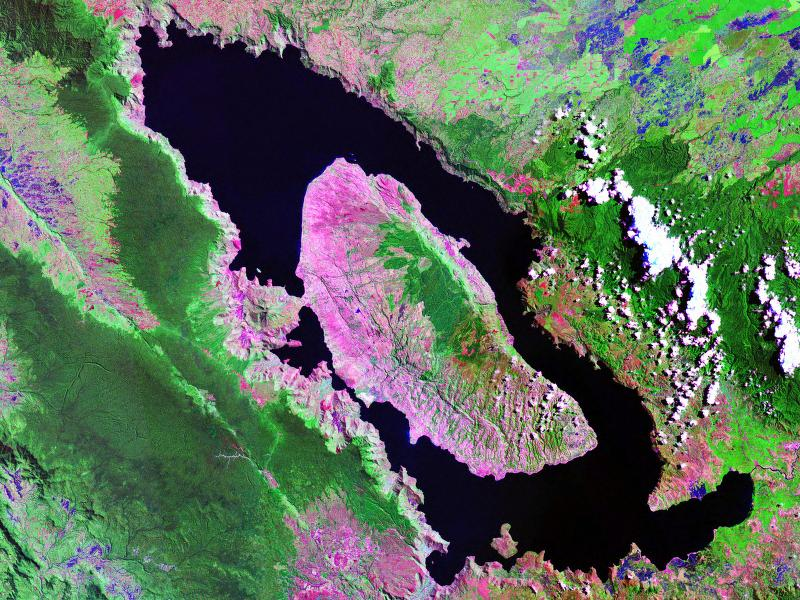
Landsat image of Lake Toba, Indonesia, the largest volcanic crater lake in the world

A well-known crater lake, which bears the same name as the geological feature, is Crater Lake in Oregon, United States. It is located in the caldera of Mount Mazama. It is the deepest lake in the United States with a depth of 594 m (1,949 ft). Crater Lake is fed solely by falling rain and snow, with no inflow or outflow at the surface, and hence is one of the clearest lakes in the world.

Due to their unstable environments, some crater lakes exist only intermittently. Caldera lakes in contrast can be quite large and long-lasting. For instance, Lake Toba in Indonesia formed after its eruption around 75,000 years ago. At around 100 kilometres (62 mi) by 30 kilometres (19 mi) in extent and 505 metres (1,657 ft) deep at its deepest point, Lake Toba is the largest crater lake in the world.

The highest volcano in the world, 6,893-m (22,615-ft) Ojos del Salado in Chile, has a permanent crater lake about 100 m (330 ft) in diameter at an elevation of 6,390 m (20,965 ft) on its eastern side.

Around Mount Gambier in South Australia, there is a cluster of crater lakes, of which Blue Lake / Warwar is the most well known.

== Dangers ==
While many crater lakes are picturesque, they can also be deadly. Gas discharges from Lake Nyos in Cameroon suffocated 1,800 people in 1986, and crater lakes such as Mount Ruapehu's in New Zealand often contribute to destructive lahars.

== Distinction from other volcanic lakes ==
Certain bodies of water, although their formation is directly related to volcanic activity, are not usually referred to as crater lakes, including:

- Lakes created by volcanic dams due to lava flowing outside of the volcanic edifice/caldera, such as Garibaldi Lake in Canada, Fuji Five Lakes in Japan
- Closed atoll lagoons, such as Clipperton lagoon, whose formation process also implies subsequent biogeomorphologic processes
- Ponds encountered at the bottom of waterfalls occurring in volcanic canyons in a volcanic context, but not within a volcanic edifice/caldera (such as Trou de Fer on Réunion Island)

== List ==
=== Africa ===
Lake	Location
Waw an Namus (three small salt lakes in the caldera)	Libya
Deriba Caldera	Sudan
Meme River Basin lakes (Lake Barombi Koto, Lake Barombi Mbo, Lake Mboandong and Lake Dissoni/Soden)	Cameroon
Lake Nachtiga (between Mount Cameroon and the Atlantic coast)	Cameroon
Bakossi Mountains: Lake Bermin and Mount Manengouba lakes (lac Mâle and lac Femelle)	Cameroon
Adamawa crater lakes (Tison, Mbalang)	Cameroon
Oku Volcanic Field, including Lake Nyos, Lake Oku, Lake Monoun, Mount Mbapit crater lake, Lake Awing and the Bambili lakes	Cameroon
Dallol (various acid ponds)	Ethiopia
Zengena Lake	Ethiopia
Enyo Lake (or Haro Dandii, a lake filling a double crater caldera on Mount Dendi) and Lake Wonchi (Badda Rogghie Mountains)	Ethiopia
Debre Zeyit crater lakes (Bishoftu, Hora, Bishoftu Guda, Koriftu and seasonal Cheleklaka)	Ethiopia
Lake Dembel, Mount Zuqualla	Ethiopia
Lake Ara Shetan (Butajiri-Silti Volcanic Field)	Ethiopia
O'a Caldera, with Lake Shala and the smaller Chitu water-filled maar	Ethiopia
Bilate River Volcanic Field (several water-filled maars)	Ethiopia
El Sod (small salt lake), Borena Zone	Ethiopia
Mount Biao, Bioko Island	Equatorial Guinea
Lago a Pot, Annobón Island	Equatorial Guinea
Lake Assal	Djibouti
Kabarole District lakes (including lakes Nyinabulitwa, Nyabikere, Nkuruba, Kifuruka)	Uganda
Many crater lakes in the Katwe-Kikorongo and Bunyaruguru (or Kichwambe) volcanic fields, respectively on the North and South sides of the Kazinga Channel (including Lake Katwe in the Queen Elizabeth National Park)	Uganda
Muhavura (small crater lake)	Rwanda / Uganda
Mount Bisoke	Rwanda / Democratic Republic of Congo
Crocodile Lake, Flamingo Lake, Tilapia Lake, on Central Island (Lake Turkana)	Kenya
Mount Marsabit (at least two lakes)	Kenya
Emuruangogolak (several maar lakes)	Kenya
Lake Simbi, Mount Homa	Kenya
Lake Sonachi (Crater Lake Game Sanctuary)	Kenya
Lake Chala	Kenya / Tanzania
Southern Highlands crater lakes (Lake Ngozi, Kiungululu Crater, Masoko Crater)	Tanzania
Lakes Magadi and Empakaai (Ngorongoro Conservation Area)	Tanzania
Lake Dziani Boundouni, Mohéli Island	Comoros
Dziani Dzaha, Petite-Terre	Mayotte
Lake Tritriva	Madagascar
Nosy Be crater lakes	Madagascar
Itasy crater lakes (close to the larger Lake Itasy)	Madagascar
Trou aux Cerfs	Mauritius
Ganga Talao lake	Mauritius
Bassin Blanc	Mauritius
Piton de l'Eau	Réunion
Lagoa do Fanal	Portugal, Madeira
Laguna de los Ciclos (Charco Verde), El Golfo, Lanzarote	Spain, Canary Islands
Pedra de Lume (salt lake in the crater), Sal Island	Cape Verde
Queen Mary's Peak (heart-shaped crater lake)	Tristan da Cunha

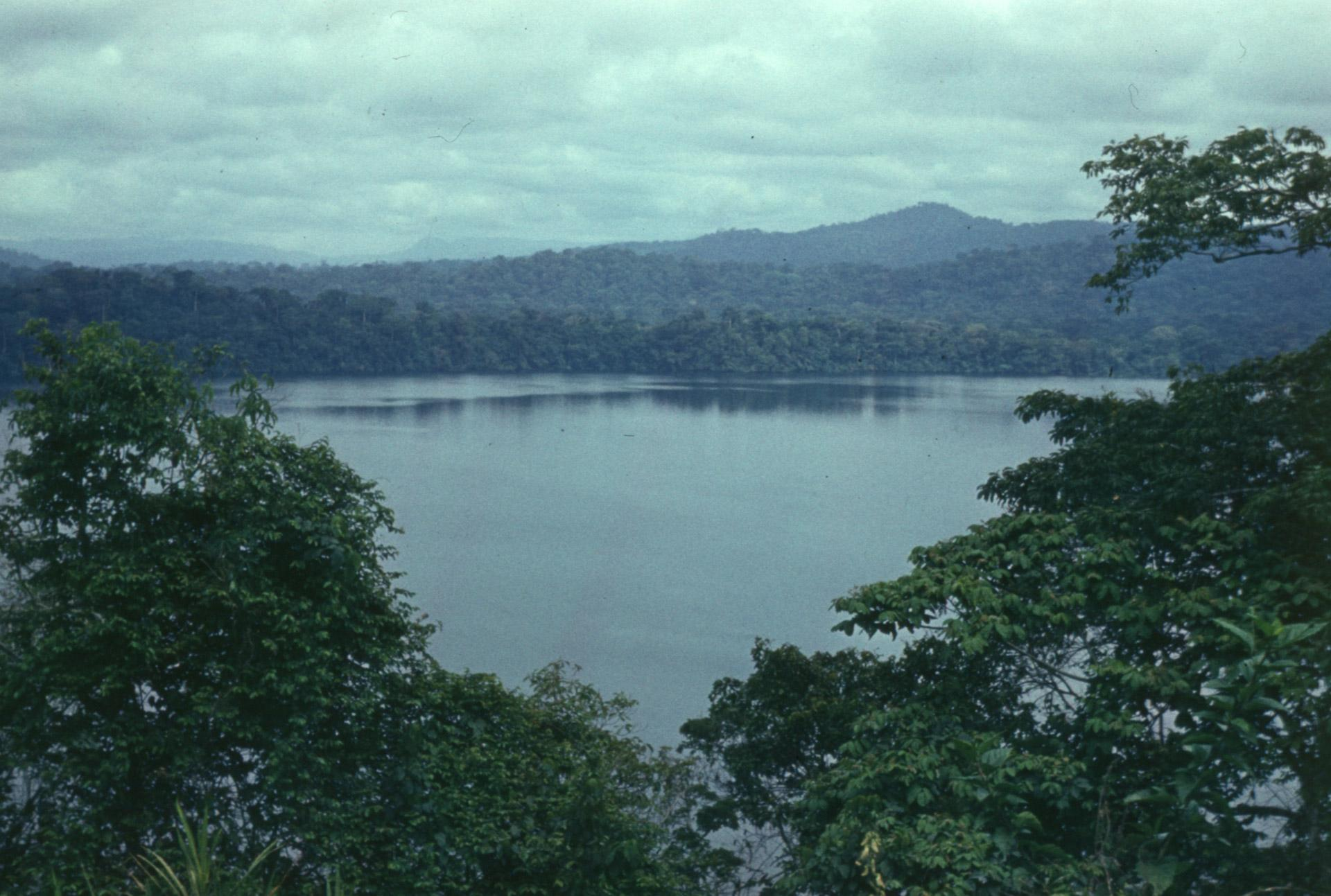
Lake Barombi, Cameroon

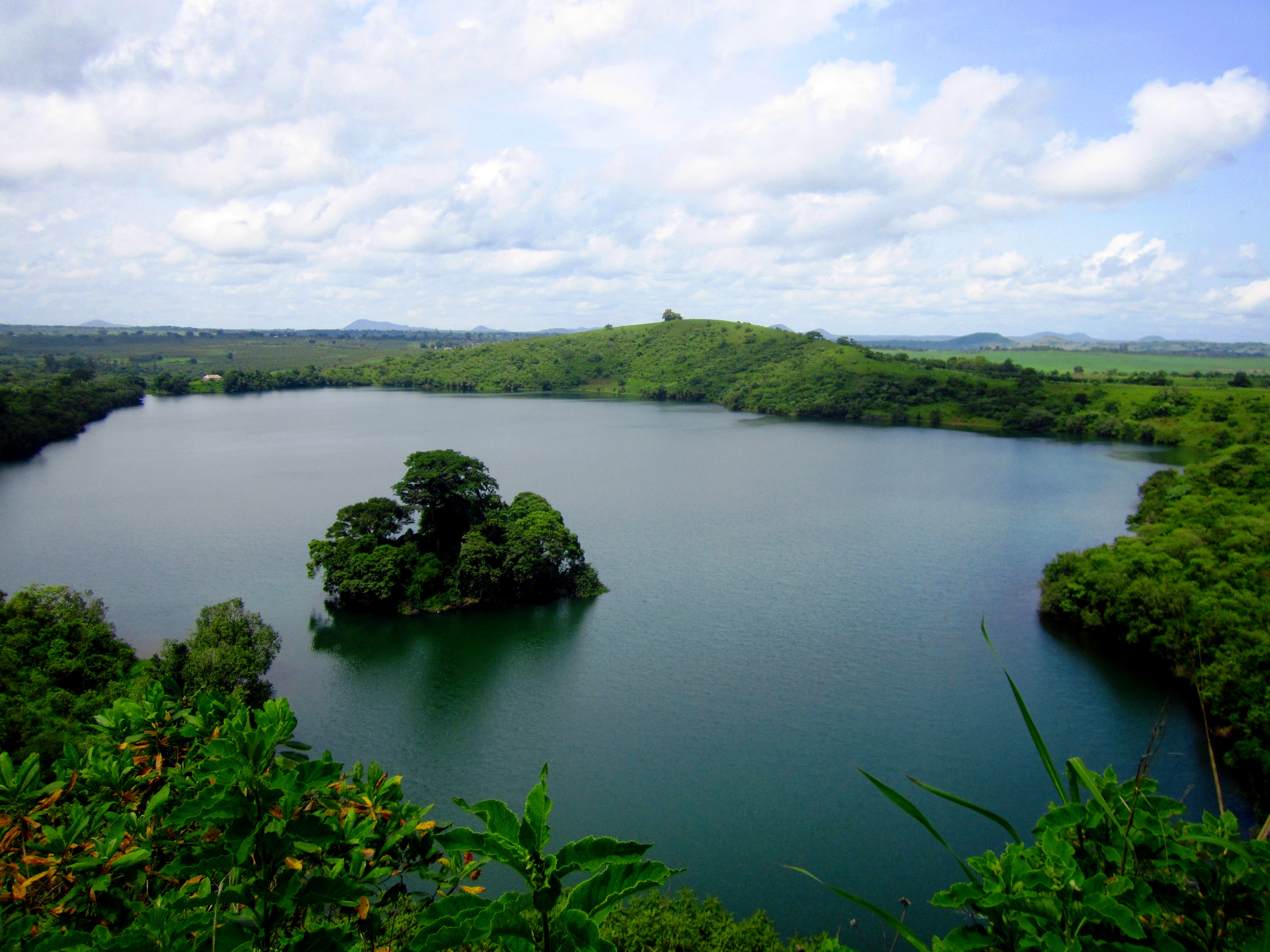
Lake Mbalang, Cameroon

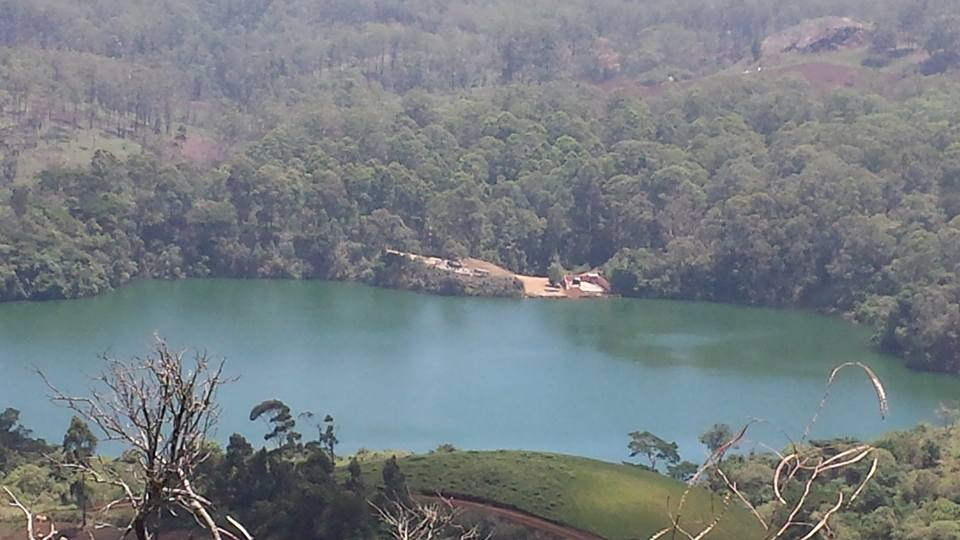
Lake Awing, Cameroon

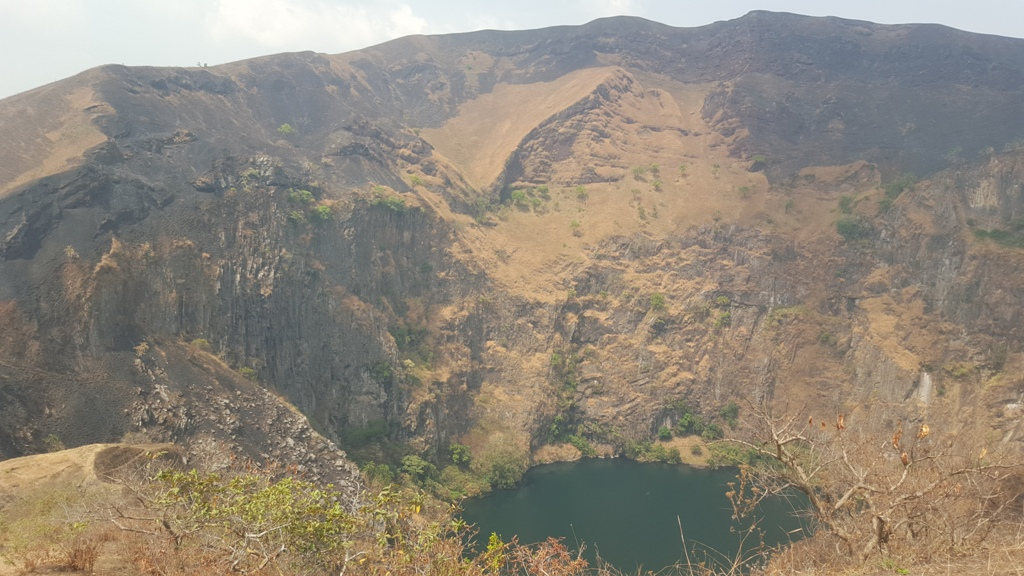
Mount Mbapit crater lake, Cameroon

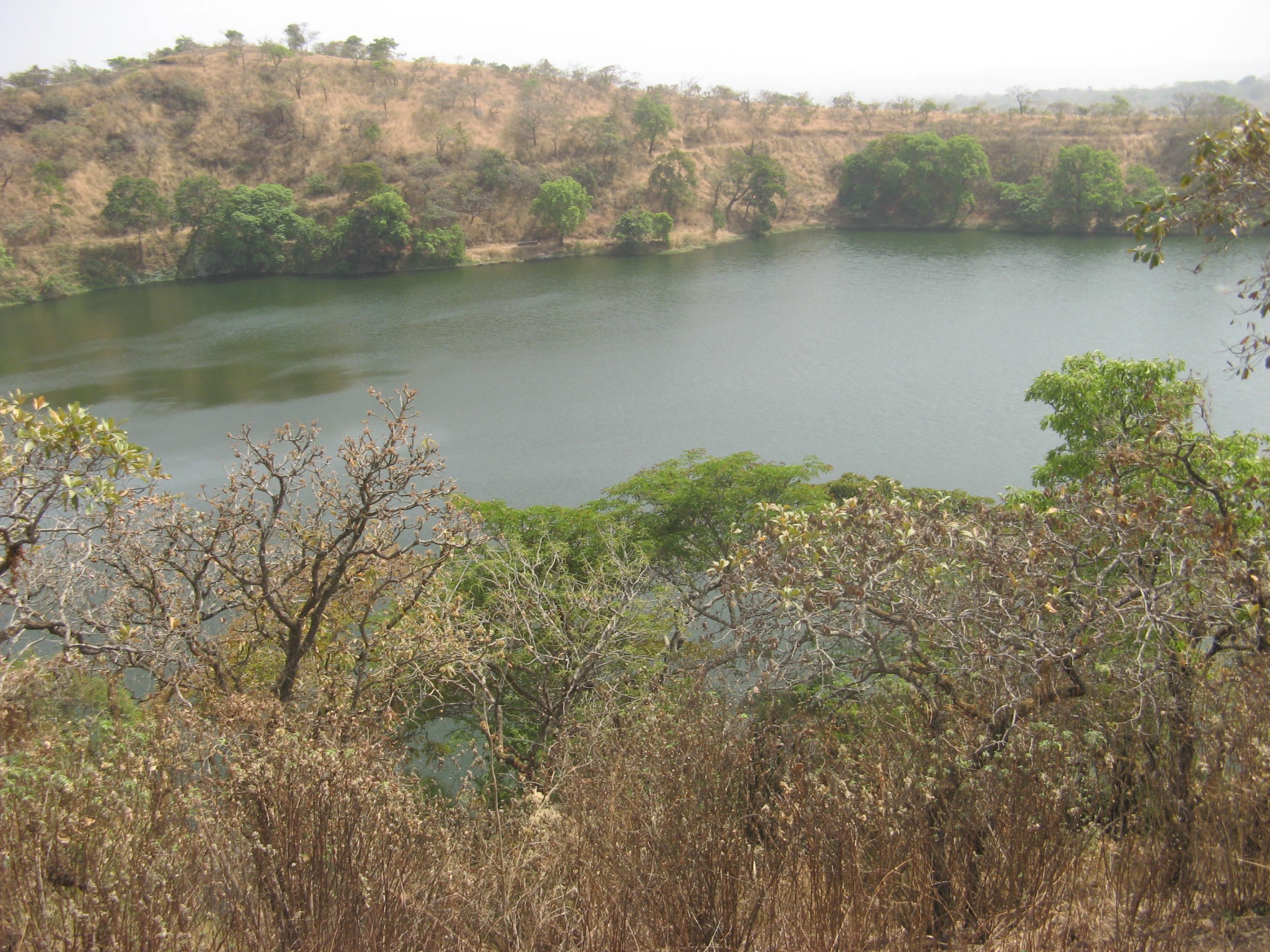
Lake Tison, Cameroon

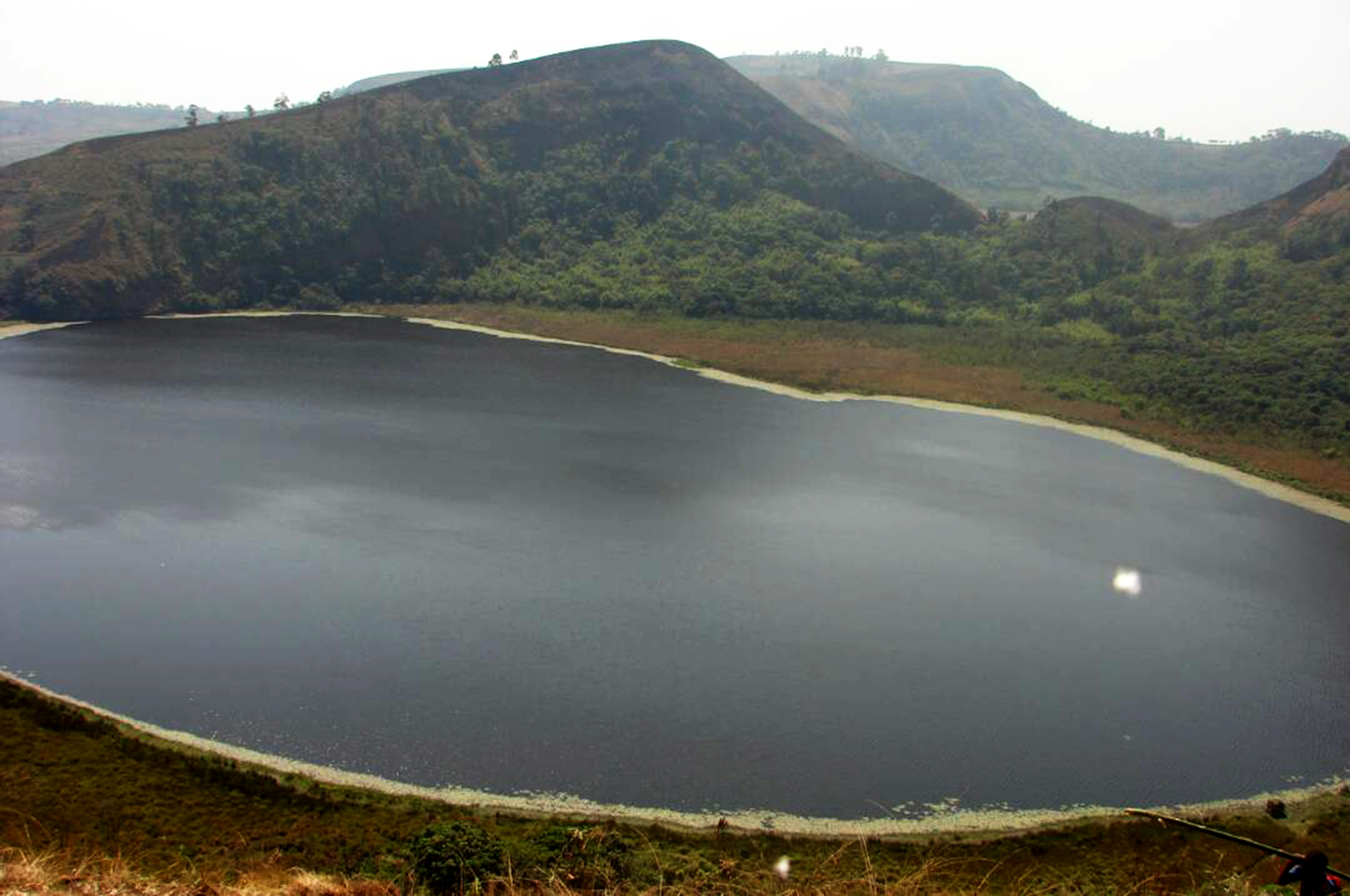
Lake Bambili, North West Cameroon

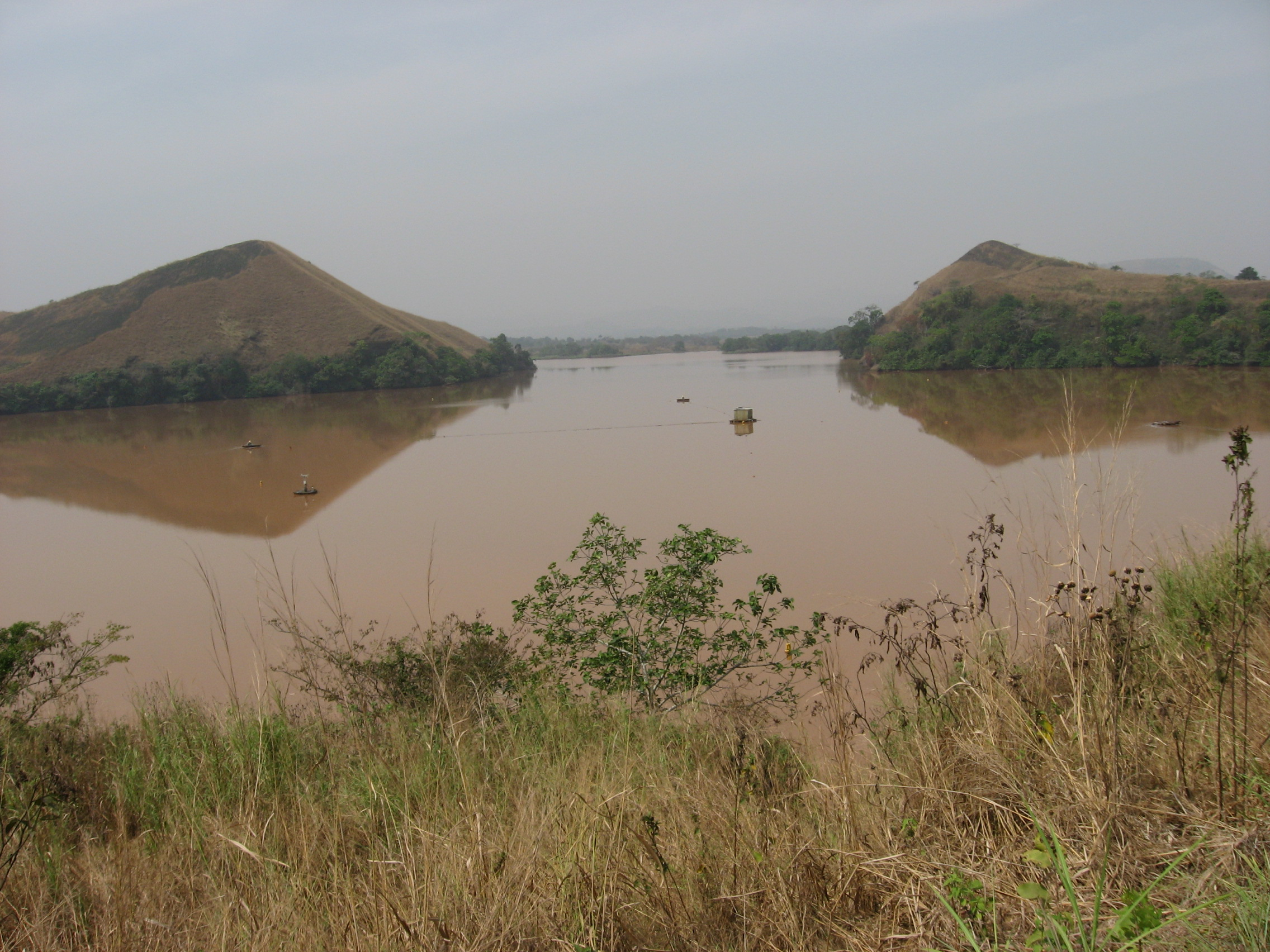
Lake Monoun exploded in 1984, Cameroon

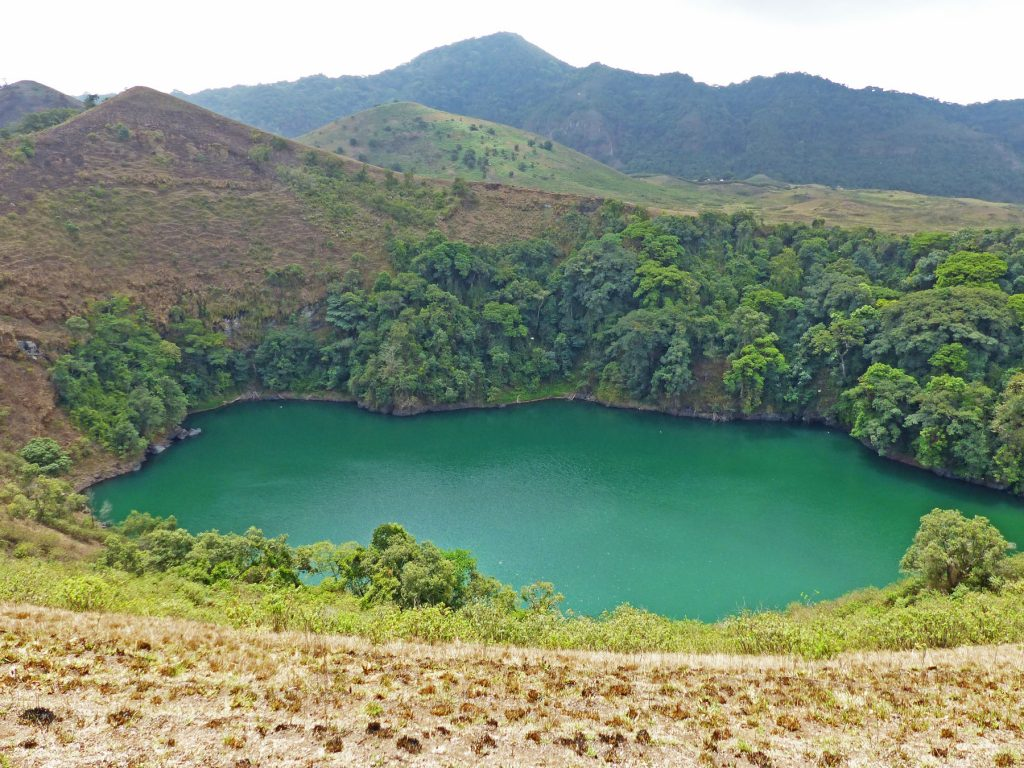
Lake Manengouba, Cameroon

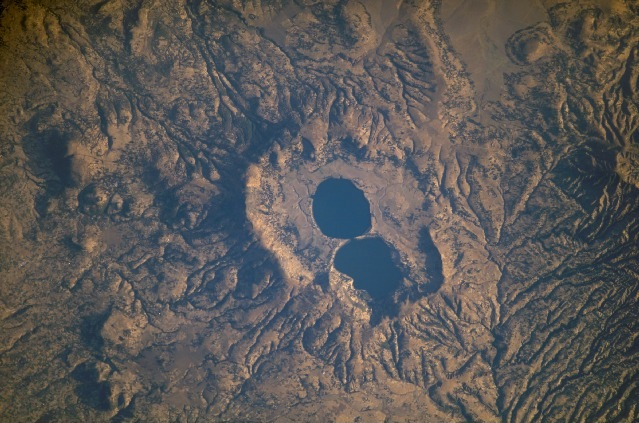
Mount Dendi double crater lake, Ethiopia (seen from the ISS)

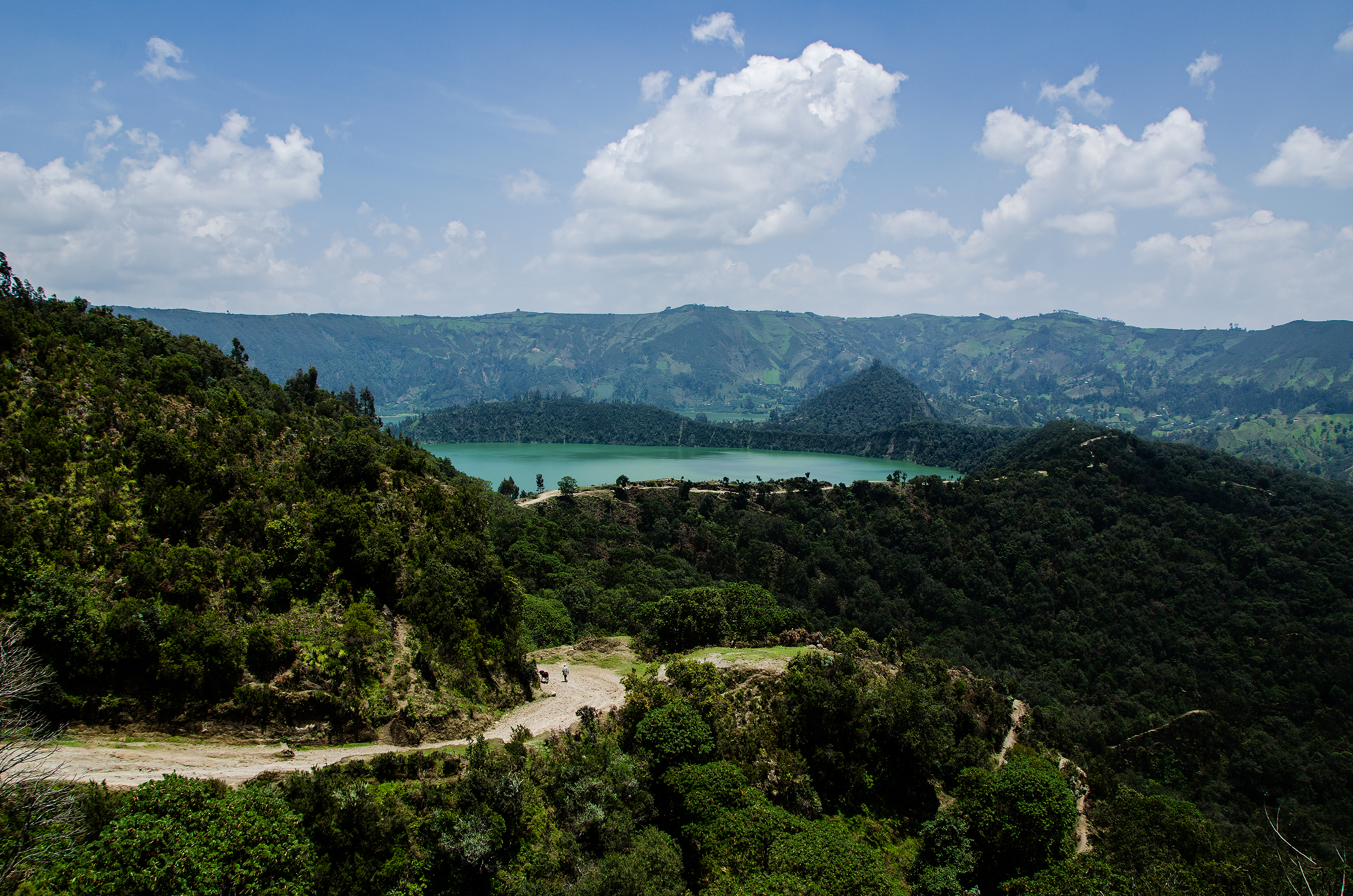
Wonchi crater lake, Ethiopia

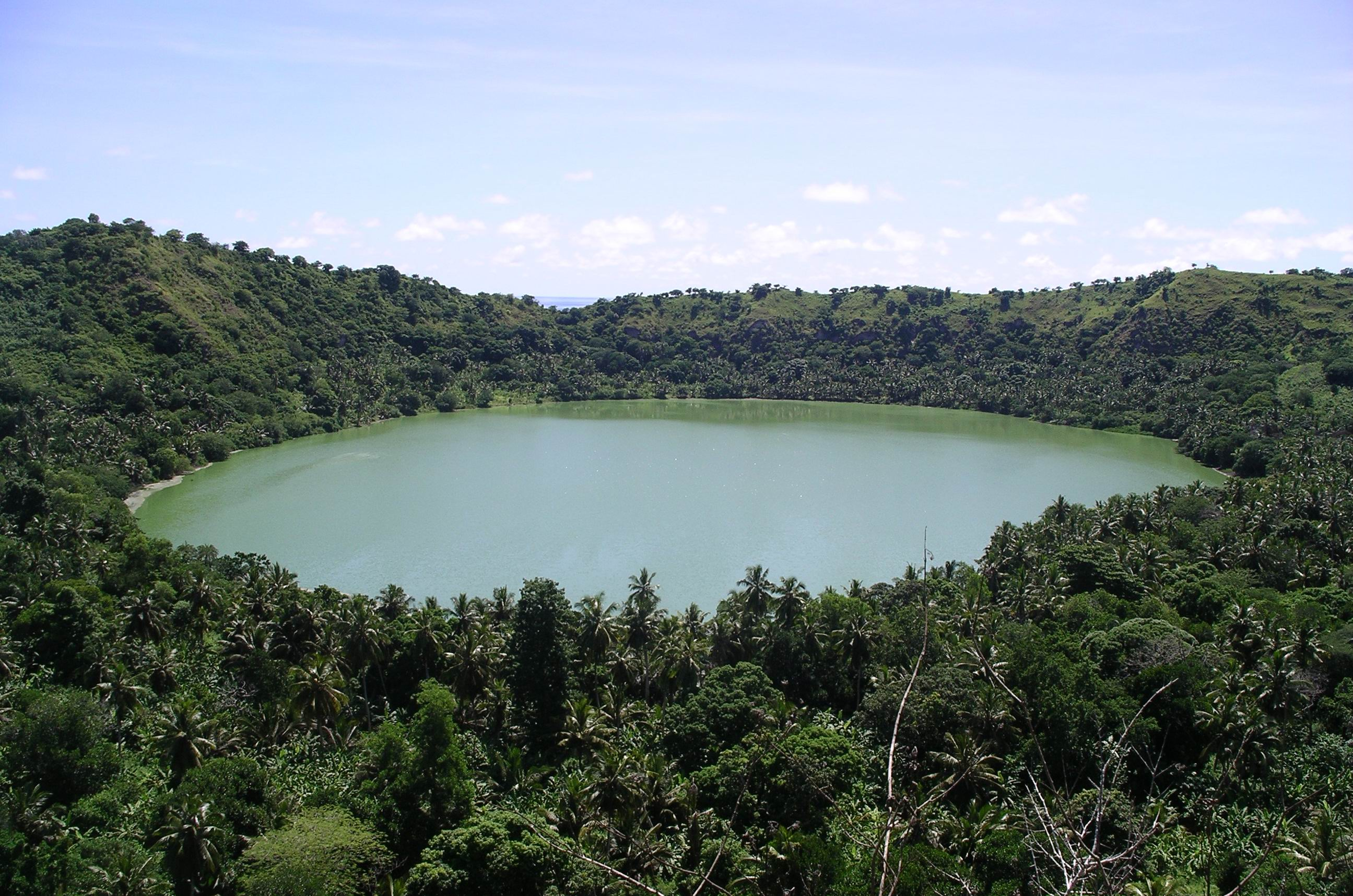
Dziani Dzaha, Mayotte

=== Antarctica and the sub-Antarctic islands ===
Lake	Location
Deception Island maare	Off the Antarctic Peninsula coast
Mount Larson crater lake, Thule Island	South Sandwich Islands
Small crater lakes on the top of various scoria cones, Marion Island	Prince Edward Islands
Bassin du Cratère (connected to sea since 1780, now an 'almost crater lake'), Saint-Paul	Saint-Paul and Amsterdam Islands
Lac bleu, Amsterdam	Saint-Paul and Amsterdam Islands
Grand Cratère, Île de la Possession	Crozet Islands

=== Asia ===
Lake	Location
Lake Toba	Indonesia, Sumatra
Mount Sibayak	Indonesia, Sumatra
Lake Maninjau	Indonesia, Sumatra
Lake Asam (Suwoh Caldera)	Indonesia, Sumatra
Lake Gunung Tujuh	Indonesia, Sumatra
Mount Talang (Talang and Dibawah Lakes)	Indonesia, Sumatra
Mount Singgalang (Dewi and Kumbang Lakes)	Indonesia, Sumatra
Bukit Daun	Indonesia, Sumatra
Mount Kerinci	Indonesia, Sumatra
Mount Kaba	Indonesia, Sumatra
Mount Dempo	Indonesia, Sumatra
Mount Kunyit	Indonesia, Sumatra
Mount Sumbing	Indonesia, Sumatra
Sorikmarapi	Indonesia, Sumatra
Ijen	Indonesia, Java
Kawah Putih, Mount Patuha	Indonesia, Java
Mount Lamongan (several maare)	Indonesia, Java
Kelut (no crater lake anymore after 2007–2008 slow eruptions with hot lava dome, but in 2014 eruption lava dome is thrown away and in rainy season, the crater is initial fill with water)	Indonesia, Java
Lake Ngebel, Mount Wilis	Indonesia, Java
Mount Lawu	Indonesia, Java
Talagabodas	Indonesia, Java
Tengger caldeira (several maar lakes on Semeru summit, seasonal lake in Bromo crater)	Indonesia, Java
The Triangle of Lakes (Ranu Klakah, Ranu Bedali, Ranu Pakis)	Indonesia, Java
Mount Galunggung crater lake	Indonesia, Java
Merdodo (Dieng Volcanic Complex)	Indonesia, Java
Telaga Warna (Dieng Volcanic Complex)	Indonesia, Java
Danau Batur, Bali	Indonesia, Lesser Sunda Islands
Lake Segara Anak (Mount Rinjani), Lombok	Indonesia, Lesser Sunda Islands
Tambora (ephemeral lake), Sumbawa	Indonesia, Lesser Sunda Islands
Kelimutu (three crater lakes), Flores	Indonesia, Lesser Sunda Islands
Inielika (several small temporary dark lakes), Flores	Indonesia, Lesser Sunda Islands
Sano Nggoang (the deepest volcanic crater lake in the world with depth of 600 meters), West Manggarai Regency, Flores	Indonesia, Lesser Sunda Islands
Mount Sirung, Pantar Island	Indonesia, Lesser Sunda Islands
Kawah Masem, Mount Sempu	Indonesia, Sulawesi
Mount Mahawu	Indonesia, Sulawesi
Lake Tondano	Indonesia, Sulawesi
Mount Klabat	Indonesia, Sulawesi
Makian	Indonesia, Maluku Islands
Mount Ibu (several small crater lakes), Halmahera	Indonesia, Maluku Islands
Todoko-Ranu, Halmahera	Indonesia, Maluku Islands
Lake Telaga Paca, Halmahera	Indonesia, Maluku Islands
Four crater lakes in the Lower Chindwin volcanic area, including Twin Taung	Burma (Myanmar)
Yak Loum	Cambodia
Nong Fa Lake	Laos
Toroeng Prong	Vietnam
Khorgo Uul (at least two lakes)	Mongolia
Chaihe scenic spot near Zhalantun (several crater lakes in this volcanic area)	China, Inner Mongolia
Longwanqun crater lakes	China, Jilin
Heaven Lake (Chonji/Tianchi), Baekdu Mountain	North Korea / China, Jilin
White Deer Lake (Baengnokdam), Mulyeongari Oreum, Muljangori Oreum	South Korea, Jeju Island
Akan caldera lakes (Akan, Mashū, Kussharo)	Japan, Hokkaidō
Lake Shikotsu	Japan, Hokkaidō
Lake Tōya	Japan, Hokkaidō
Lake Kuttara	Japan, Hokkaidō
Towada	Japan, Honshū
Tazawa (deepest lake in Japan)	Japan, Honshū
Mount Zaō (lake Okama)	Japan, Honshū
Mount Kusatsu-Shirane (three lakes, including the acidic Yu-gama with sulfur rafts floating on its turquoise surface)	Japan, Honshū
Izu-Tobu (Ippeki lake)	Japan, Honshū
Lake Haruna	Japan, Honshū
Mount Hakone (Lake Ashi)	Japan, Honshū
Naruko (Lake Katanuma)	Japan, Honshū
Aizu-Bandai-san (various lakes)	Japan, Honshū
Mount Iwate	Japan, Honshū
Mount Ontake (five crater lakes)	Japan, Honshū
Oguni-numa Pond	Japan, Honshū
Numazawa-numa lake	Japan, Honshū
Hachoike, Mount Amagi	Japan, Honshū
Mount Aso (Naka-dake)	Japan, Kyūshū
Satsuma Peninsula, Lake Ikeda and Lake Unagi-ike	Japan, Kyūshū
Mount Kirishima lakes (including Mi-ike, Oonamino-ike, Rokkannonmi-ike, Byakushi-ike)	Japan, Kyūshū
Imuta-ike	Japan, Kyūshū
Tairo-ike, Miyake-jima	Japan, Izu Islands
Otake, Nakanoshima	Japan, Ryukyu Islands
Lake Pinatubo	Philippines, Luzon
Taal Lake (caldera-filling) and the crater lake on its island's volcano	Philippines, Luzon
Laguna de Bay	Philippines, Luzon
Seven Lakes of San Pablo (Bunot, Calibato, Yambo, Pandin, Palakpakin, Muhikap, Sampaloc)	Philippines, Luzon
Lake Tikub	Philippines, Luzon
Mount Talinis (lakes Balinsasayao, Danao and Kabalin-an, within the Guintabon Caldera), Negros Island	Philippines, Visayas
Margaja Valley caldera, Kanlaon Volcano, Negros Island	Philippines, Visayas
Lakes Danao and Malagsom, Mahagnao Volcano, Leyte Island	Philippines, Visayas
Lake Duminagat, Mount Malindang	Philippines, Mindanao
Lake Leonard, Leonard Kniaseff	Philippines, Mindanao
Mount Apo	Philippines, Mindanao
Lake Maughan, Mount Parker	Philippines, Mindanao
Jolo Island, Lakes Seit, Panamao, Timpuak and Sani Crater	Philippines, Mindanao, Sulu Archipelago
Lake Khaiyr	Russia, Yakutia
Khangar	Russia, Kamchatka
Kizimen	Russia, Kamchatka
Lake Dalny, Uzon Caldera	Russia, Kamchatka
Maly Semyachik	Russia, Kamchatka
Bolshoy Semyachik	Russia, Kamchatka
Karymsky Lake, Akademia Nauk	Russia, Kamchatka
Balshoe and Kraternoe, Ksudach	Russia, Kamchatka
Kurile Lake	Russia, Kamchatka
Gorely	Russia, Kamchatka
Ebeko, Paramushir Island	Russia, Kuril Islands
Onekotan Island (Kal'tsevoe Lake in the Tao-Rusyr Caldera and Nemo Lake/Caldera)	Russia, Kuril Islands
Ketoy Island	Russia, Kuril Islands
Zavaritski Caldera, Simushir Island	Russia, Kuril Islands
Rudakov, Urup Island	Russia, Kuril Islands
Iturup Island lakes (Medvezhia, Chirip, Grozny Group, Bogatyr Ridge)	Russia, Kuril Islands
Sabalan	Iran
Nemrut	Turkey
Meke Golu (Karapınar Field)	Turkey
Lake Acıgöl (bitter lake), also called Lake Nar (pomegranate lake)	Turkey
Karagöl (Lake Tantalus), Mount Yamanlar	Turkey
Lake Ram	Israel
Bir Ali crater	Yemen
Zubayr Group Islands (crater lakes on Saba Island and on the new island formed during the 2011–2012 eruption)	Yemen

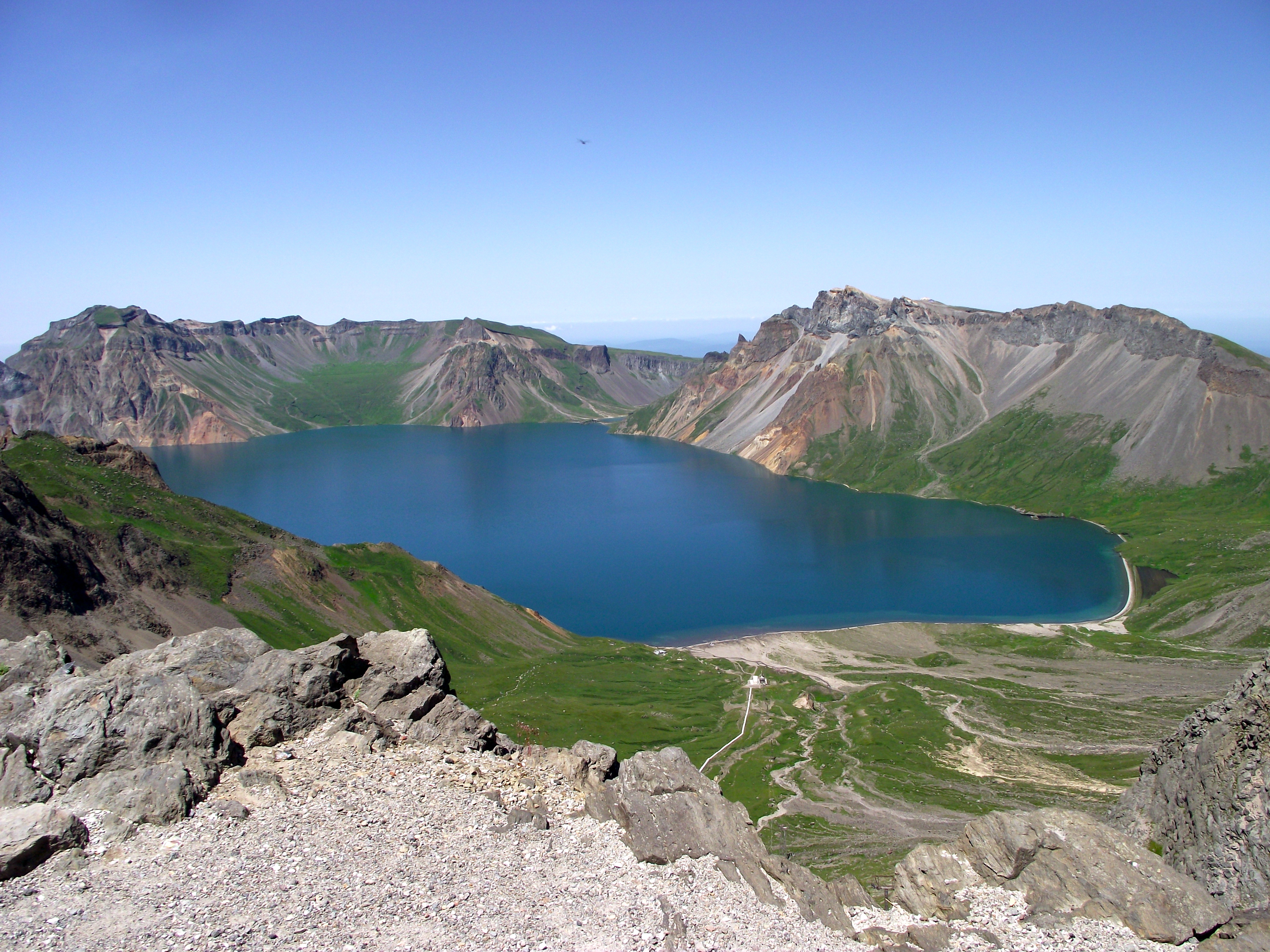
Heaven Lake, the crater lake of Paektu Mountain on the China–North Korea border

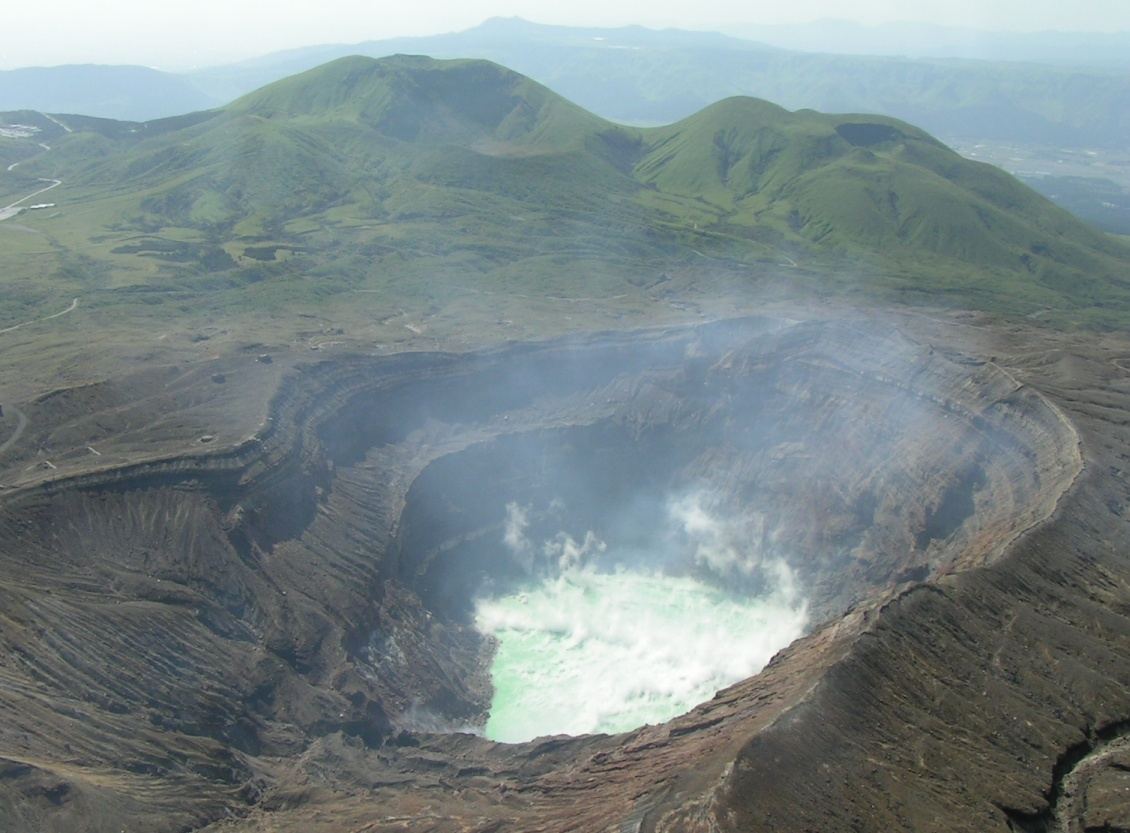
Mount Aso crater lake, Japan

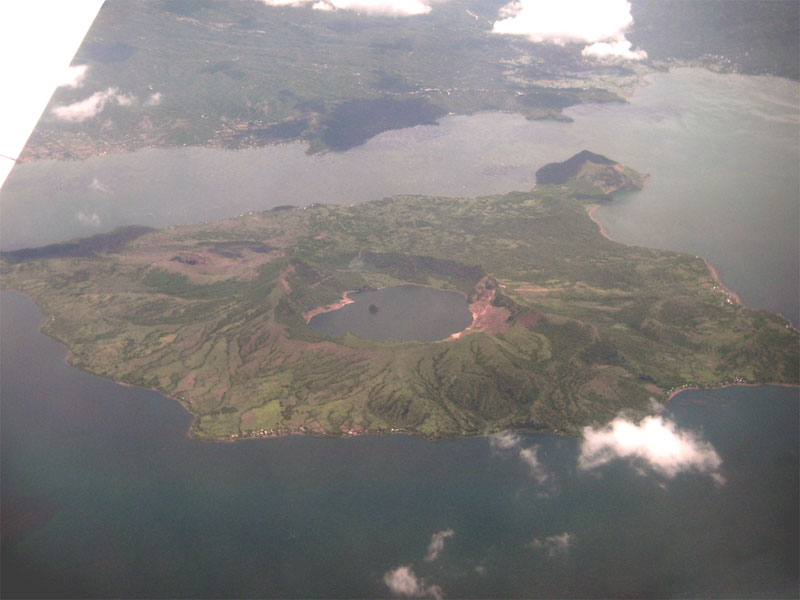
Taal volcano, Philippines

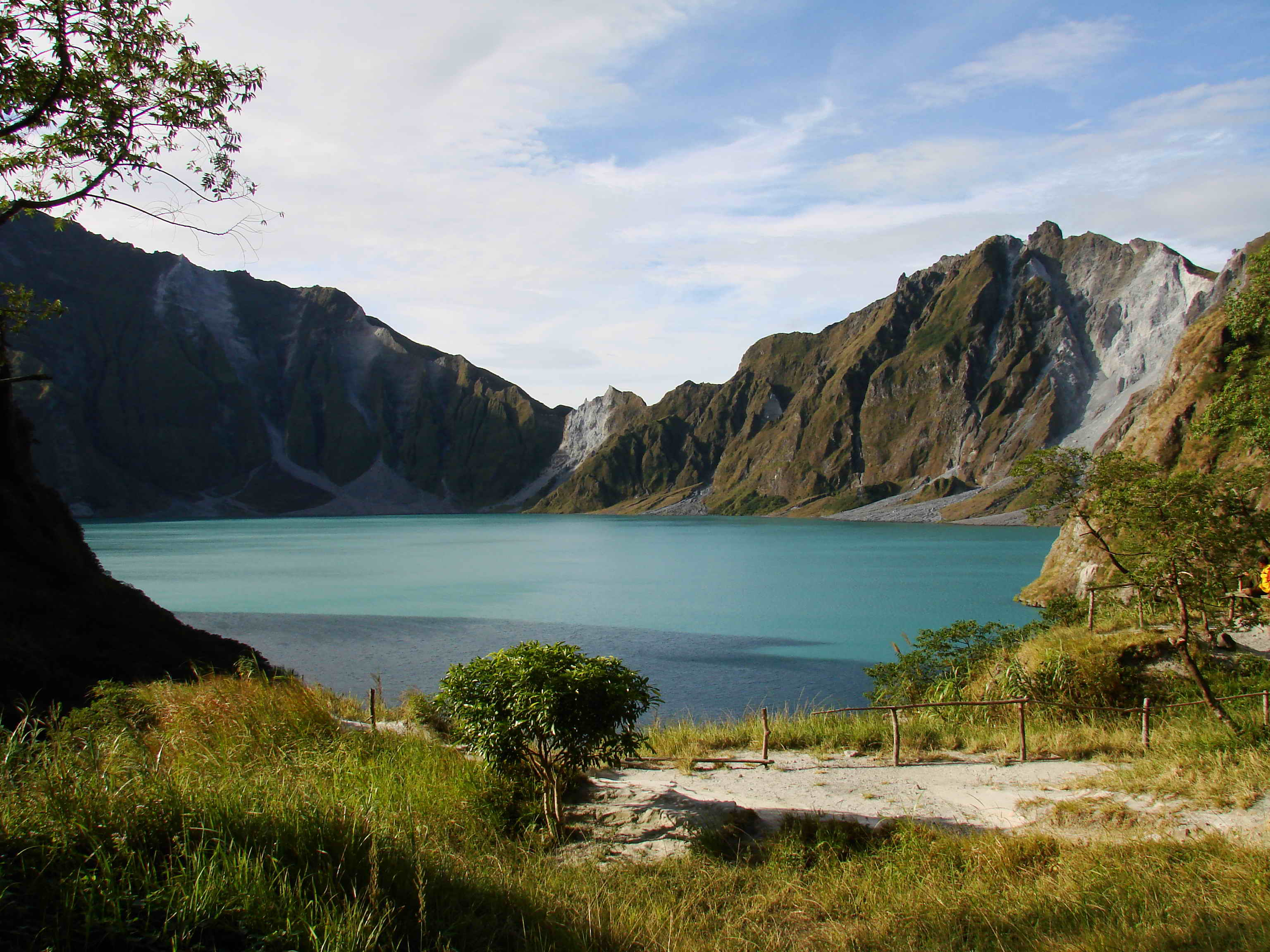
Lake Pinatubo, Philippines, formed after the 1991 eruption of Mount Pinatubo

=== Europe ===
Lake	Location
Eifel volcanic field (where maare were originally described), including Laacher See and Daun maars	Germany
Eyjafjallajökull (volcano)	Iceland
Kerið	Iceland
Askja (Öskjuvatn and Viti lakes)	Iceland
Krafla	Iceland
Lake Bardarlaug	Iceland
Grímsvötn (subglacial lake in the caldera, now exposed following the 2011 eruption)	Iceland
Crater lakes in the Landmannalaugar area (Blahylur, Ljotipollur)	Iceland
Chaîne des Puys (Gour de Tazenat, Lac Pavin, Lac de Servière, Lac Chauvet, Lac du Bouchet, Lac d'En-Haut)	France
Lac d'Issarlès	France
Lazio crater lakes (Albano, Bolsena, Bracciano, Martignano, Nemi, Vico, Mezzano)	Italy
Lake Avernus (close to Phlegraean Fields)	Italy
Lake Sfânta Ana, Ciomadul volcano	Romania
Lakes of Monticchio (Lago di Monticchio Grande and Lago di Montichhio Piccolo, twin crater lakes)	Italy
Lago Vecchienna	Italy
Lago Specchio di Venere (Venus Mirror Lake) or Bagno dell’Acqua (hydrothermal lake within a calderic depression)	Italy, Pantelleria
Seasonal maar lakes in the Provincia Volcánica de Calatrava (Hoya del Acebuche, Hoya de Cervera)	Spain
Lagoa do Caldeirão, Corvo Island	Portugal, Azores
Lagoa da Caldeira, Faial Island	Portugal, Azores
Lagoas Funda das Lajes, Branca, Comprida, Seca, da Lomba, Rasa, Funda/Negra, Flores Island	Portugal, Azores
Caldeira do Enxofre (underground lake filled with cold sulfur water), Graciosa Island	Portugal, Azores
Lagoas Seca, da Rosada, Pico Island	Portugal, Azores
Lagoa do Pico Pinheiro, São Jorge Island	Portugal, Azores
Lagoa das Sete Cidades, do Fogo, das Furnas, Azul, Verde, São Miguel Island	Portugal, Azores
Lagoas Negra, do Negro, Terceira Island	Portugal, Azores
Mount Samsari (several small lakes in the caldera)	Georgia
Lake Akna, Geghama mountains	Armenia

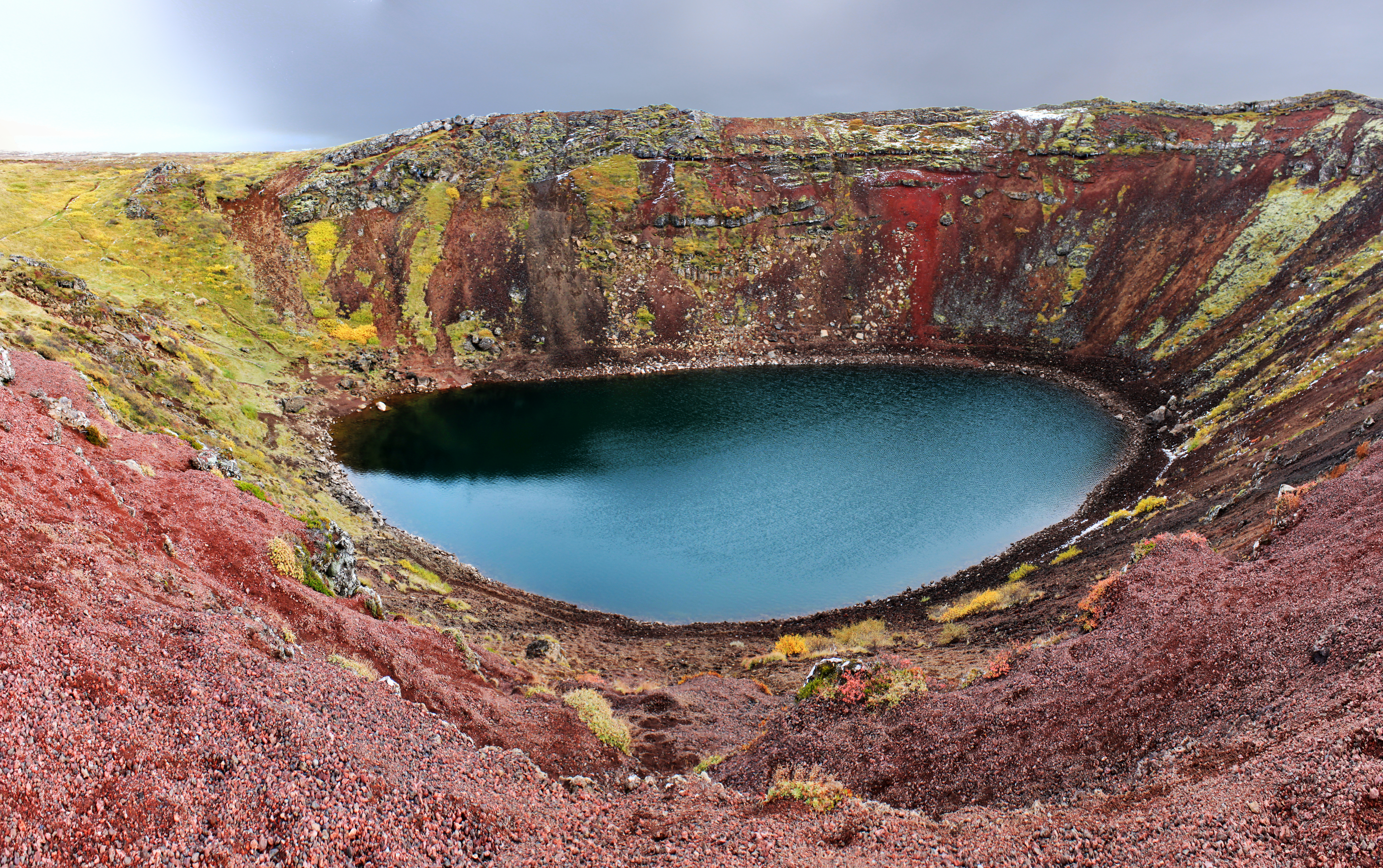
Kerið crater lake, Iceland

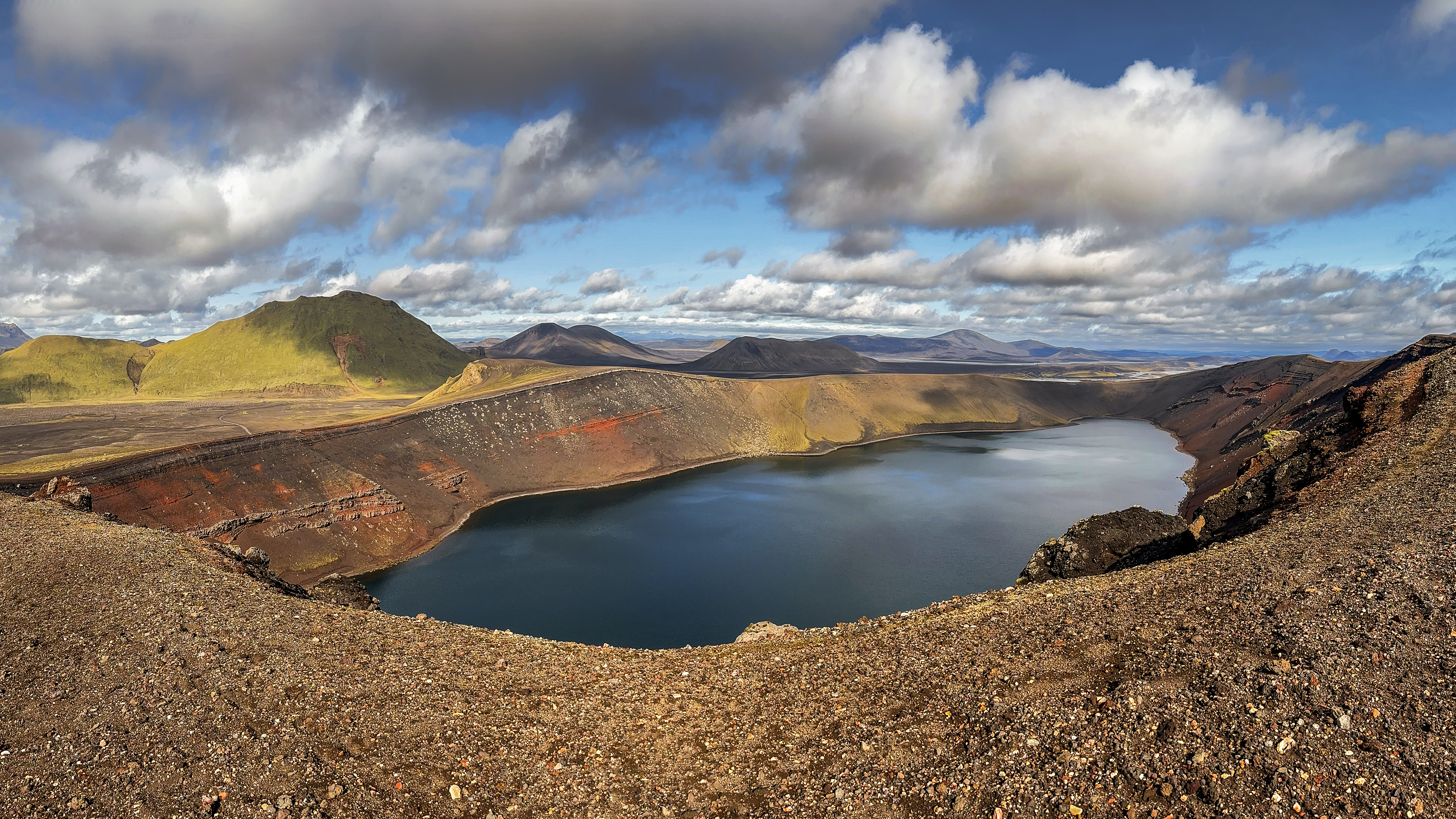
Ljòtipollur Crater Lake, Iceland

=== North America ===
Lake	Location
Kasatochi volcano, Kasatochi Island	United States, Alaska, Aleutian Islands
Mount Okmok, Umnak Island	United States, Alaska, Aleutian Islands
Mount Kanaga, Kanaga Island	United States, Alaska, Aleutian Islands
Fenner Lake, Semisopochnoi Island	United States, Alaska, Aleutian Islands
Fisher Caldera (several lakes), Unimak Island	United States, Alaska, Aleutian Islands
Mount Katmai	United States, Alaska
Ukinrek maars	United States, Alaska
Mount Kaguyak	United States, Alaska
Mount Martin (intermittent acidic lake)	United States, Alaska
Mount Douglas	United States, Alaska
Devil Mountain Lakes	United States, Alaska
Surprise Lake, Mount Aniakchak	United States, Alaska
Mount Emmons	United States, Alaska
Mount Spurr	United States, Alaska
Mount Chiginagak	United States, Alaska
Fiftytwo Ridge (several crater lakes)	Canada, British Columbia
Mount Rainier	United States, Washington
Battle Ground Lake	United States, Washington
Crater Lake	United States, Oregon
Blue Lake Crater	United States, Oregon
Malheur Maar, Diamond Craters	United States, Oregon
Newberry Volcano (twin crater lakes: Paulina Lake and East Lake)	United States, Oregon
Teardrop Pool South Sister	United States, Oregon
Yellowstone Lake	United States, Wyoming
Soda Lakes	United States, Nevada
Medicine Lake Volcano	United States, California
Mono–Inyo Craters	United States, California
Clear Lake	United States, California
Shastina (three small crater lakes)	United States, California
Zuni Salt Lake (maar)	United States, New Mexico
Lago Los Espinos	Mexico, Michoacán
La Alberca lake (also known as La Joya or Lago del Sangre)	Mexico, Guanajuato
Nevado de Toluca (several lakes)	Mexico, State of Mexico
Laguna de Aljojuca	Mexico, Puebla
Oriental Basin axalapazcos (maar lakes)	Mexico, Puebla / Tlaxcala / Veracruz
Sangangüey	Mexico, Nayarit
Santa María del Oro	Mexico, Nayarit
El Chichón	Mexico, Chiapas
Central America & Caribbean
Lago de Amatitlán	Guatemala
Lake Ipala	Guatemala
Lago de Atitlán	Guatemala
Laguna de Ayarza	Guatemala
Laguna de Calderas (Pacaya)	Guatemala
Laguna Chicabal	Guatemala
Tecuamburro	Guatemala
Lago de Coatepeque (Coatepeque Lake)	El Salvador
Laguna Verde (Apaneca)	El Salvador
Lago de Ilopango (Ilopango Lake)	El Salvador
Tecapa volcano (Laguna de Alegría)	El Salvador
Chanmico maar (at the foot of the San Salvador volcano)	El Salvador
Santa Ana Volcano crater lake	El Salvador
Cosigüina	Nicaragua
Laguna Asososca, Las Pilas	Nicaragua
Lakes within the Monte Galan caldera, close to the Momotombo (Laguna Monte Galan, La Sulfatosa, Agua Dulce, El Cachital, Las Piedras)	Nicaragua
Chiltepe peninsula (Apoyeque and Xiloá lagoons)	Nicaragua
Managua lagoons (Tiscapa, Asososca, Nejapa)	Nicaragua
Masaya lake	Nicaragua
Apoyo Lagoon	Nicaragua
Zapatera Laguna (Zapatera Island, on Lake Nicaragua)	Nicaragua
Maderas (Ometepe Island, on Lake Nicaragua)	Nicaragua
Rincón de la Vieja	Costa Rica
Lake Hule	Costa Rica
Poco Sol	Costa Rica
Lake Congo and Lake Pozo Verde part of Porvenir Volcano	Costa Rica
Río Cuarto	Costa Rica
Poás volcano (Laguna Caliente and Laguna Botos)	Costa Rica
Cerro Chato	Costa Rica
Barva Volcano	Costa Rica
Lake Diego de la Haya, Irazú volcano	Costa Rica
Mount Liamuiga crater lake, Saint Kitts	Saint Kitts and Nevis
La Grande Soufrière (la Citerne)	Guadeloupe
Boiling Lake (Morne Trois Pitons National Park)	Dominica
Soufrière	Saint Vincent
Grand Etang	Grenada
Lac Antoine, Mount Saint Catherine	Grenada

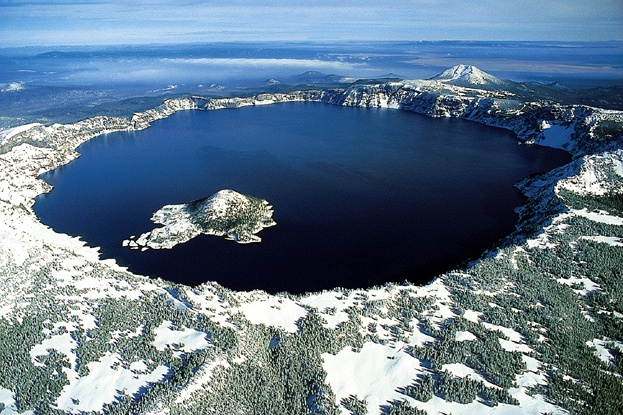
Crater Lake in Oregon, US

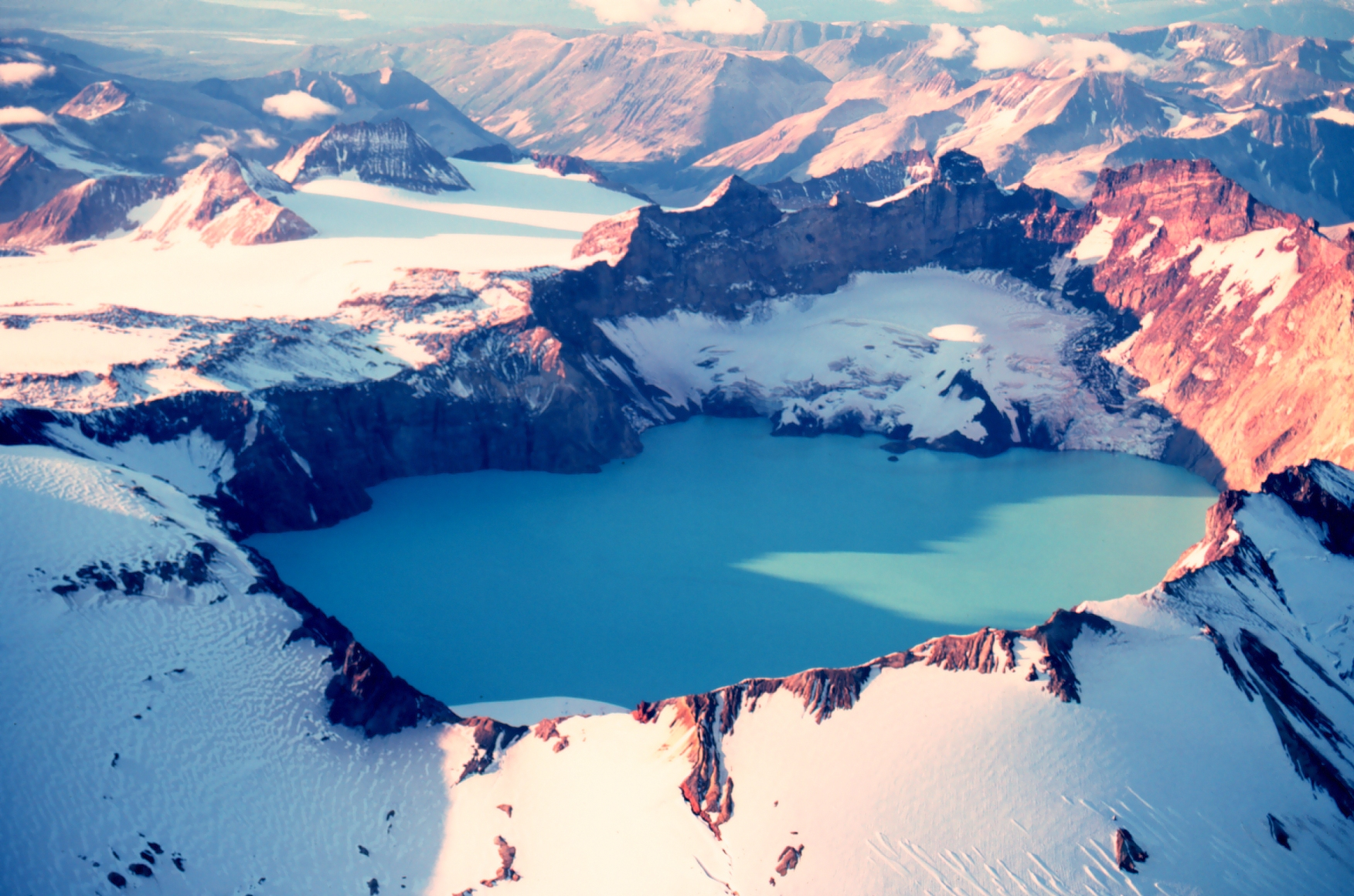
Katmai crater lake, Alaska, US

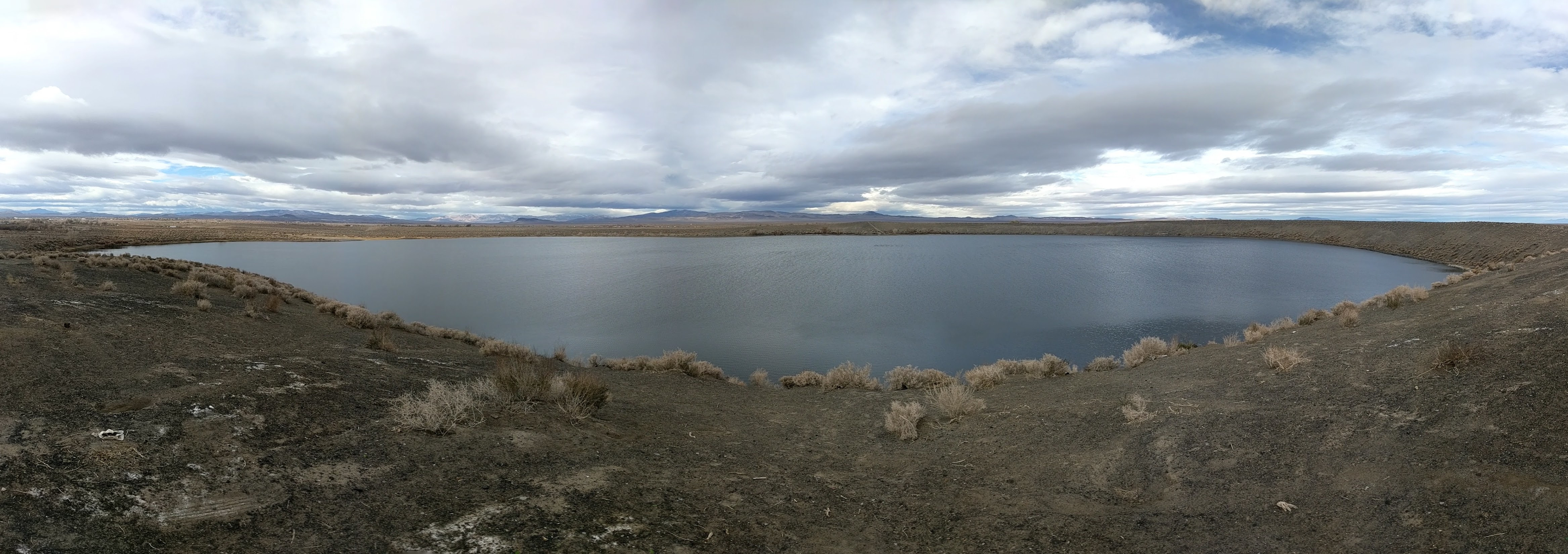
Soda Lakes maar volcano in Nevada, US

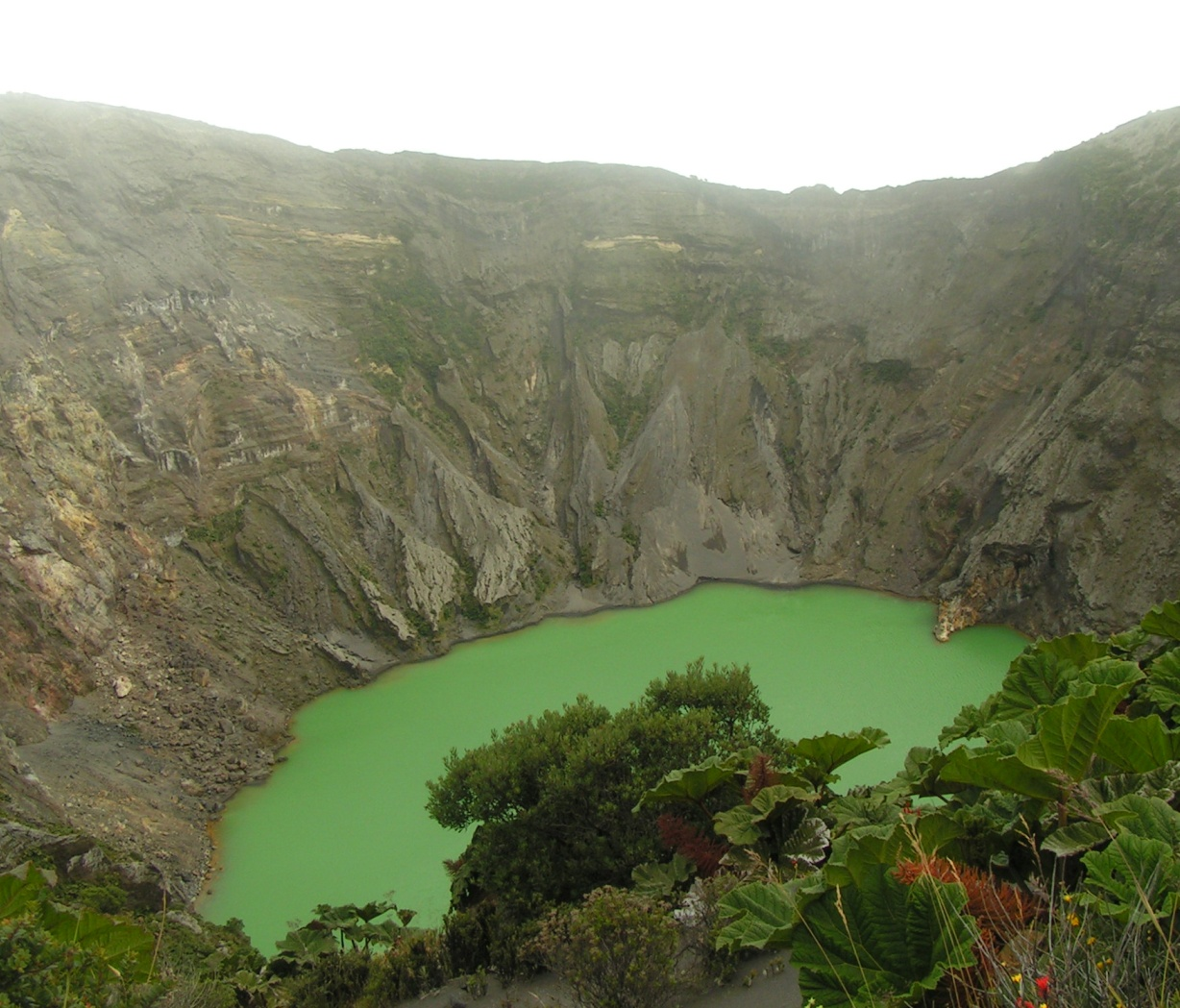
Irazú crater lake, Costa Rica

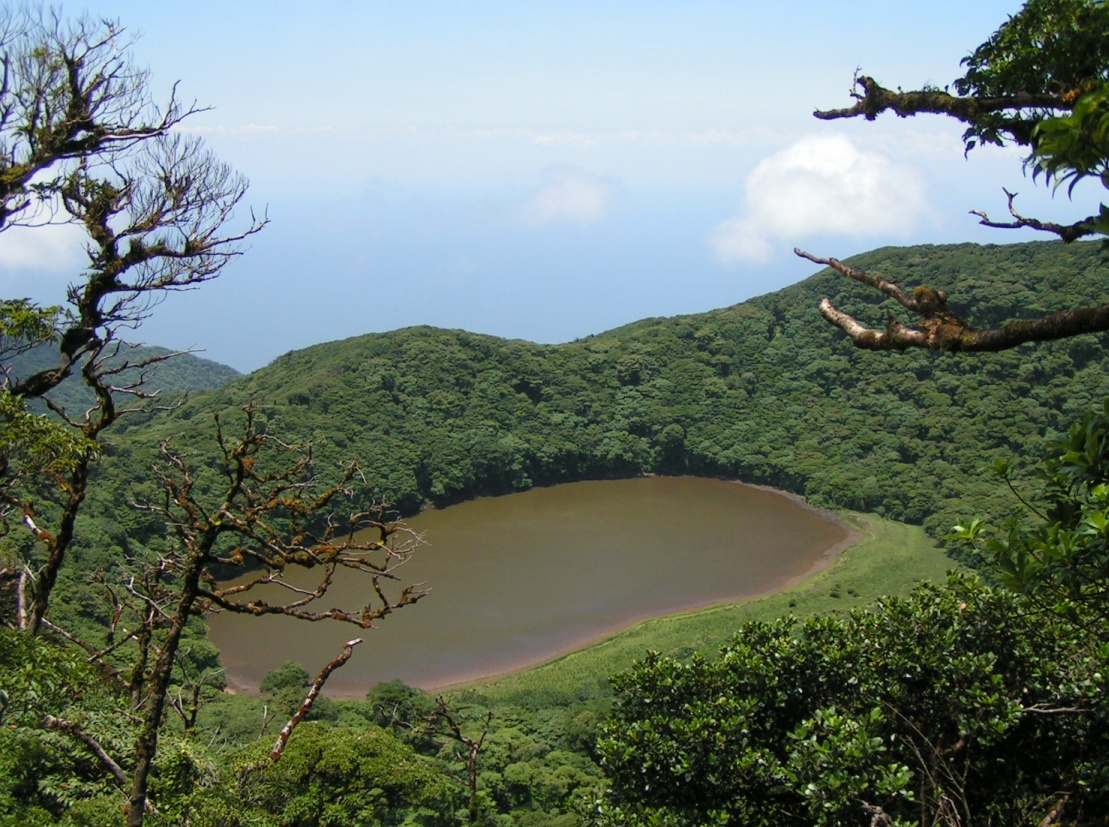
Maderas crater lake (Ometepe Island), Nicaragua

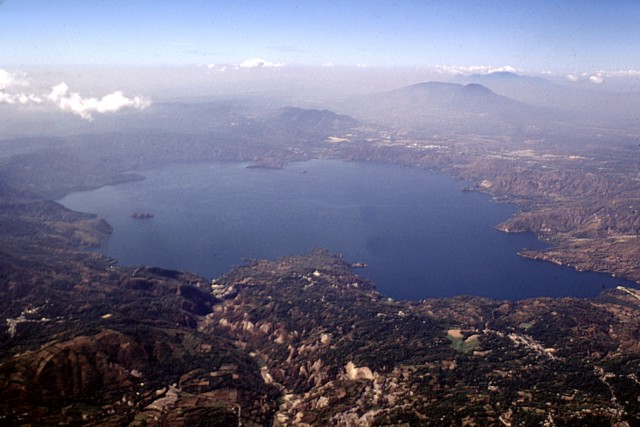
Lake Ilopango, El Salvador, crater lake

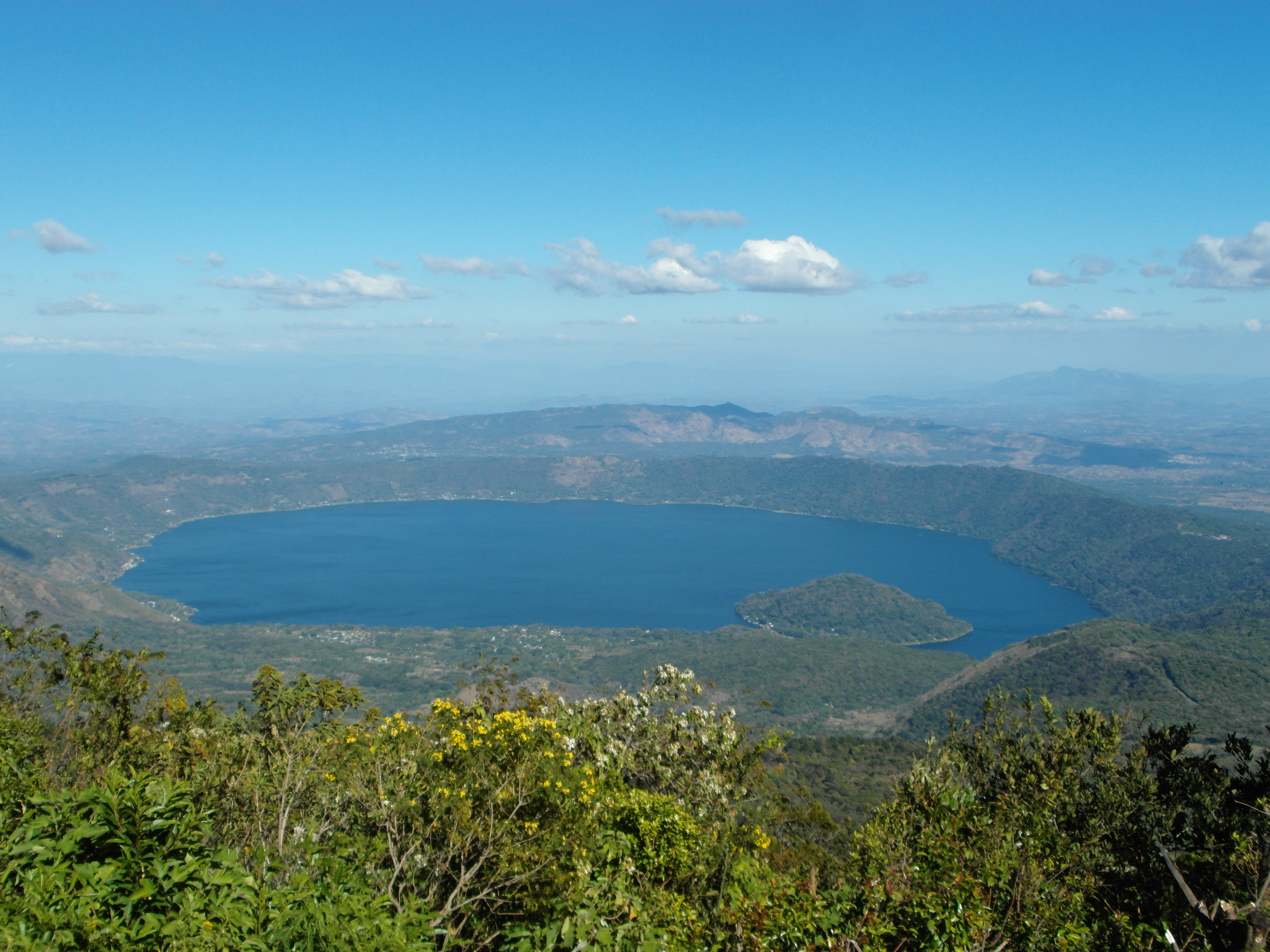
Coatepeque Caldera, El Salvador, crater lake

=== Oceania ===
Lake	Location
Crater Lake (Te Wai ā-moe), Mount Ruapehu	New Zealand, North Island
Lake Taupō	New Zealand, North Island
Lakes of Rotorua, including Rotorua, Tarawera, Rotomahana, Rotokākahi, Tikitapu, Ōkareka and Ōkataina and smaller lakes from the Waimangu Volcanic Rift Valley (Inferno Crater Lake, Frying Pan Lake, Southern Crater Lake)	New Zealand, North Island
Lake Pupuke	New Zealand, North Island
Māngere Lagoon	New Zealand, North Island
Mount Tongariro (Tama Lakes, Blue Lake and the Emerald Lakes)	New Zealand, North Island
Whakaari / White Island (Bay of Plenty), Crater Lake	New Zealand, off North Island coast
Tuhua / Mayor Island (Bay of Plenty), Lake Aroarotamahine and Lake Te Paritu	New Zealand, off North Island coast
Raoul Island (Blue Lake, Green Lake, Rui Lake)	New Zealand, Kermadec Islands
Victory Volcano crater lake	Papua New Guinea, New Guinea
Lake Wisdom, Long Island	Papua New Guinea, off New Guinea coast
Mount Balbi lake	Papua New Guinea, Bougainville
Billy Mitchell	Papua New Guinea, Bougainville
Loloru (crescent-shaped crater lake)	Papua New Guinea, Bougainville
Dakataua (horseshoe-shaped caldera lake)	Papua New Guinea, New Britain
Sakar Island	Papua New Guinea, off New Britain coast
Mount Gambier maar complex (including Blue Lake)	Australia, South Australia
Atherton Tableland (Lake Euramoo, Lake Eacham, Lake Barrine, Mount Hypipamee Crater, Lynch's Crater, Bromfield Swamp)	Australia, Queensland
Mount Le Brun (two intermittent crater lakes)	Australia, Queensland
Leura maar complex (Purrumbete, Bullen Merri, Gnotuk, Keilambete, Elingamite, Wangoom, Red Rock intermittent lakes)	Australia, Victoria
Tower Hill	Australia, Victoria
Mount Eccles	Australia, Victoria
Green Lake, Kapoho Crater, Kīlauea, Big Island,	USA, Hawaii
Lake Waiau, crater of the Pu'u Waiau cinder cone, Mauna Kea, Big Island,	USA, Hawaii
Kalaupapa crater lake, Molokai	USA, Hawaii
Salt Lake (filled in for an urbanization project, except for a pond in a golf course), Honolulu, Oahu	USA, Hawaii
Rano Kau, Rano Raraku and Rano Aroi (Ma′unga Terevaka)	Chile, Easter Island
Anatahan (intermittent lake in the caldera)	Northern Mariana Islands
Lake Te Roto, Tikopia	Solomon Islands
Lake Lanoto'o, Upolu	Samoa
Vai Lahi and Vai Si'i, Niuafo'ou	Tonga
Tofua	Tonga
Late (ephemeral lake)	Tonga
Home Reef (newly formed island, crater lakes observed in 2006)	Tonga
Lakes Lalolao, Lano, Lanutavake, Lanutuli, Lanumaha, Kikila and Alofivai (intermittent), Wallis Island	Wallis and Futuna
Lake Tagimaucia, Taveuni Island	Fiji
Lake Letas, Gaua Island	Vanuatu
Lombenben Volcano (lakes Vui, Manaro Ngoru, Manaro Lakua), Aoba Island	Vanuatu

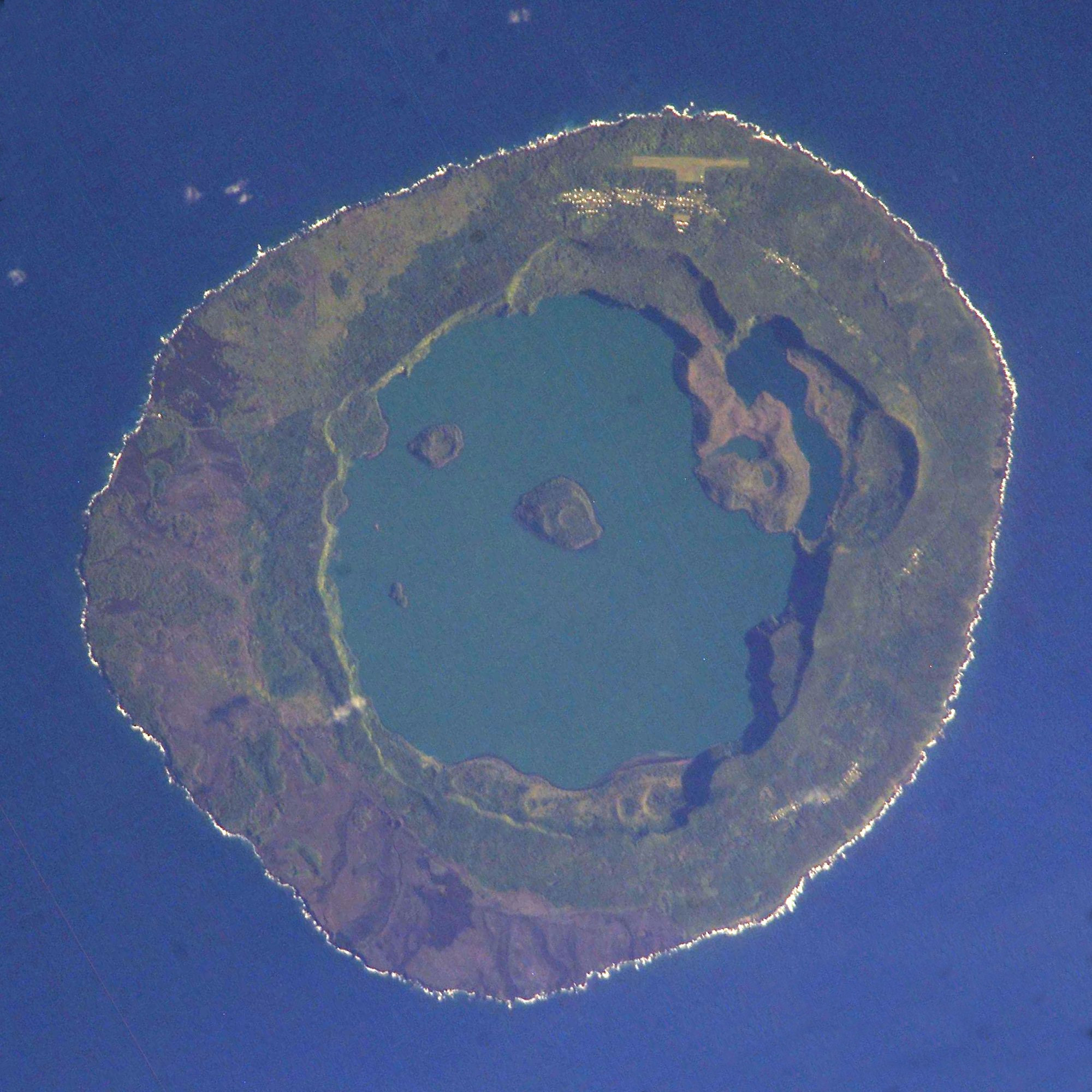
Niuafo'ou crater lake, Tonga

=== South America ===
Lake	Location
Azufral (Laguna Verde, Laguna Negra, Laguna Cristal)	Colombia
Laguna de la Cocha	Colombia
Lagunas Verdes, Chiles Volcano	Ecuador
Mojanda lakes (Caricocha, Yanacocha and Huarmicocha)	Ecuador
Laguna Collanes, El Altar	Ecuador
Cuicocha	Ecuador
Quilotoa	Ecuador
Black Lakes of Jumbura	Ecuador
La Cumbre, Fernandina Island (ephemeral lake)	Ecuador, Galapagos Islands
Tagus Cove, Isabela Island	Ecuador, Galapagos Islands
Lake Arcturus, Genovesa Island	Ecuador, Galapagos Islands
Laguna El Juncos, San Cristóbal Island	Ecuador, Galapagos Islands
Santiago Island (small salt crater lake)	Ecuador, Galapagos Islands
Jayu Quta (also known as Miguel y Alex Tejada or Maracanacito crater)	Bolivia
Laguna del Maule	Chile
Nevado Ojos del Salado (likely the highest lake in the world)	Chile
Licancabur Lake	Chile
Chaitén (crater lakes might have disappeared with the 2008–09 eruption)	Chile
Aguas Calientes	Chile
Acamarachi	Chile
Copahue	Chile / Argentina
Planchón-Peteroa	Chile / Argentina
Laguna Potrok Aike (Pali-Aike Volcanic Field)	Argentina
Aracar	Argentina
Laguna Diamante, Cerro Galán	Argentina

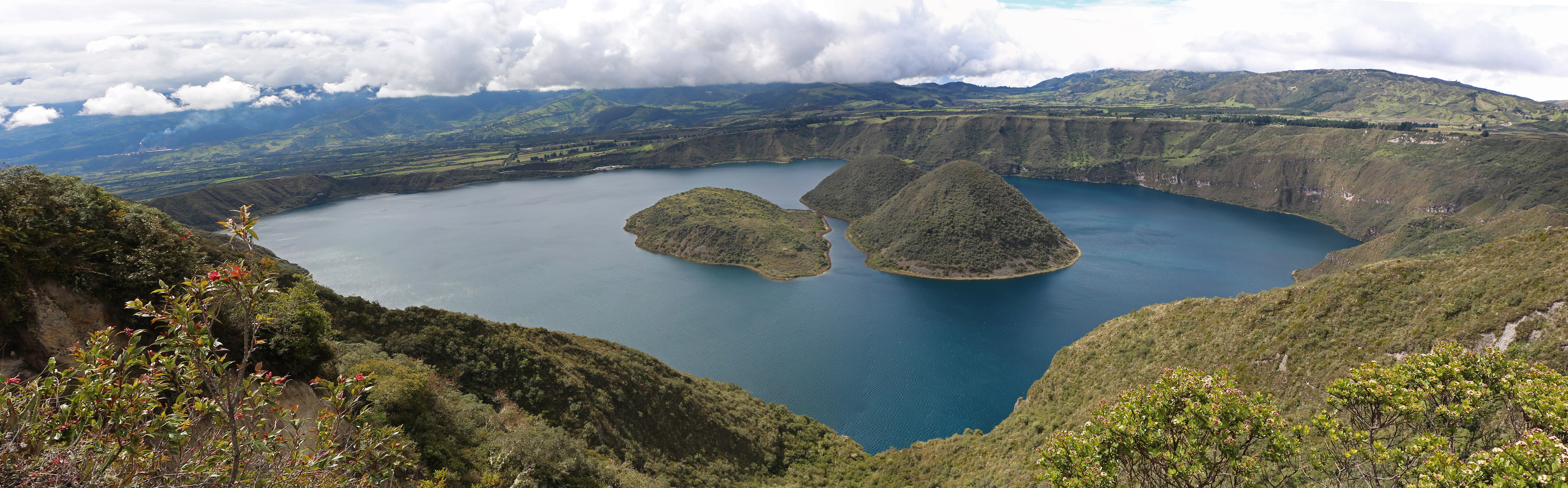
Cuicocha, Ecuador

== See also ==
- Impact crater lake
- Lava lake
