= Mainit Hot Springs Protected Landscape =

Protected area in Philippines

- IUCN category V (protected landscape/seascape)
- Location within Philippines
- Location: Davao de Oro, Philippines
- Nearest city: Tagum
- Coordinates: 7°29′47″N 126°2′35″E
- Area: 1,374 hectares (3,400 acres)
- Established: December 12, 1957 (National park); May 31, 2000 (Protected landscape)
- Governing body: Department of Environment and Natural Resources

The Mainit Hot Springs Protected Landscape is a protected landscape area located in the province of Davao de Oro on the island of Mindanao in the Philippines. It preserves the sulfuric hot springs and surrounding forest in Nabunturan municipality which also contains the headwaters of the Manat River, a source of water supply for surrounding villages. First declared a national park in 1957 by virtue of Proclamation No. 466 by President Carlos P. Garcia, it had an initial area of 1,381 hectares (3,410 acres). Under the National Integrated Protected Areas System, it was reclassified as a protected landscape through Proclamation No. 320 issued in 2000 by President Joseph Estrada. The hot springs are a popular ecotourist attraction in Davao de Oro. Its name "Mainit" is a Filipino word which means hot.

== Geography ==
The Mainit protected landscape encompasses an area of 1,374 hectares (3,400 acres) with a buffer zone of 401 hectares (990 acres) in the villages of Mainit and Bukal in the mountainous parts of southeastern Nabunturan. It is located near the border with the municipality of Maco in the Leonard Mountain Range just north of Lake Leonard. The park is composed of a network of springs, waterfalls and streams that flow through the volcanic mountains into the Manat River, a tributary of the Agusan River. These include the Inoparan Creek, Matagdungan Creek, Saosao River, Tigabaca Creek, Esolvin Creek and Tawangan Creek in the Manat River Basin which supplies water to the villages of Mainit and Bukal. The park also contains over thirty caves, rock formations and patches of surviving primary and secondary growth dipterocarp forests. The highest elevation in the protected area is at 1,200 metres (3,900 ft) above sea level.

The area is home to an indigenous tribe called Mansaka. Near the hot springs, several cottages and pools have been built for the tourists. The Toyozu Inland Resort can also be found within Mainit and a reservoir has also been built. It is located approximately 33 kilometres (21 mi) northeast of Tagum and some 90 kilometres (56 mi) from Davao City, the largest city of Davao Region, via the Pan-Philippine Highway (AH26) and Nabunturan–Mainit Park Road.

== Biodiversity ==
The forests of the Mainit protected area support several old dipterocarp and giant fern species. Fifty percent of its forest cover is Yemane and Falcata plantations, while shrub species such as hagimit, binunga, and himlaumo inhabit the rest.

The park hosts several avifauna species including the red-keeled flowerpecker, Asian glossy starling, grey imperial pigeon, Philippine turtle dove, Philippine coucal, olive-backed sunbird, yellow-vented bulbul, zebra dove, collared kingfisher, and the endangered green-winged dove. In the caves on the slopes flanking the river basin, swiftlets known as sayaw-sayaw, and several small to medium-sized native bats producing guano, a highly effective fertilizer, can also be found. Some of the park's large mammals include the long-tailed macaque, Asian palm civet, Philippine tree squirrel, and Celebes warty pig. It is also known to harbor reticulated pythons and water monitors.
