= Chauvet =

Chauvet may refer to:

- Chauvet Cave, a pre-historic site with Paleolithic cave art
- Lac Chauvet, a lake in France
- C.H. Chauvet, a French aircraft constructor; see List of aircraft (Cd–Cn)

== Persons ==
- Charles-Alexis Chauvet (1837–1871), French organist and composer
- Géraldine Chauvet, French operatic mezzo-soprano
- Guy Chauvet (1933–2007), French tenor
- Jules Chauvet (1907-1989), French winemaker
- Patricia Chauvet (born 1967), French alpine skier
- Pierre Chauvet (cross-country skier), French cross-country skier, two-time Kilomètre vertical de Fully winner
- Pierre Chauvet (racing driver), pseudonym of Friedrich Glatz (1943–2002), Austrian racing driver
- Stéphen Chauvet (1885–1950), French physician and author of Easter Island and Its Mysteries
- Vincent Chauvet (born 1987), French activist and politician
