= Dziani Dzaha =

Crater lake in Mayotte

Coordinates: 12°46′05″S 045°17′10″E

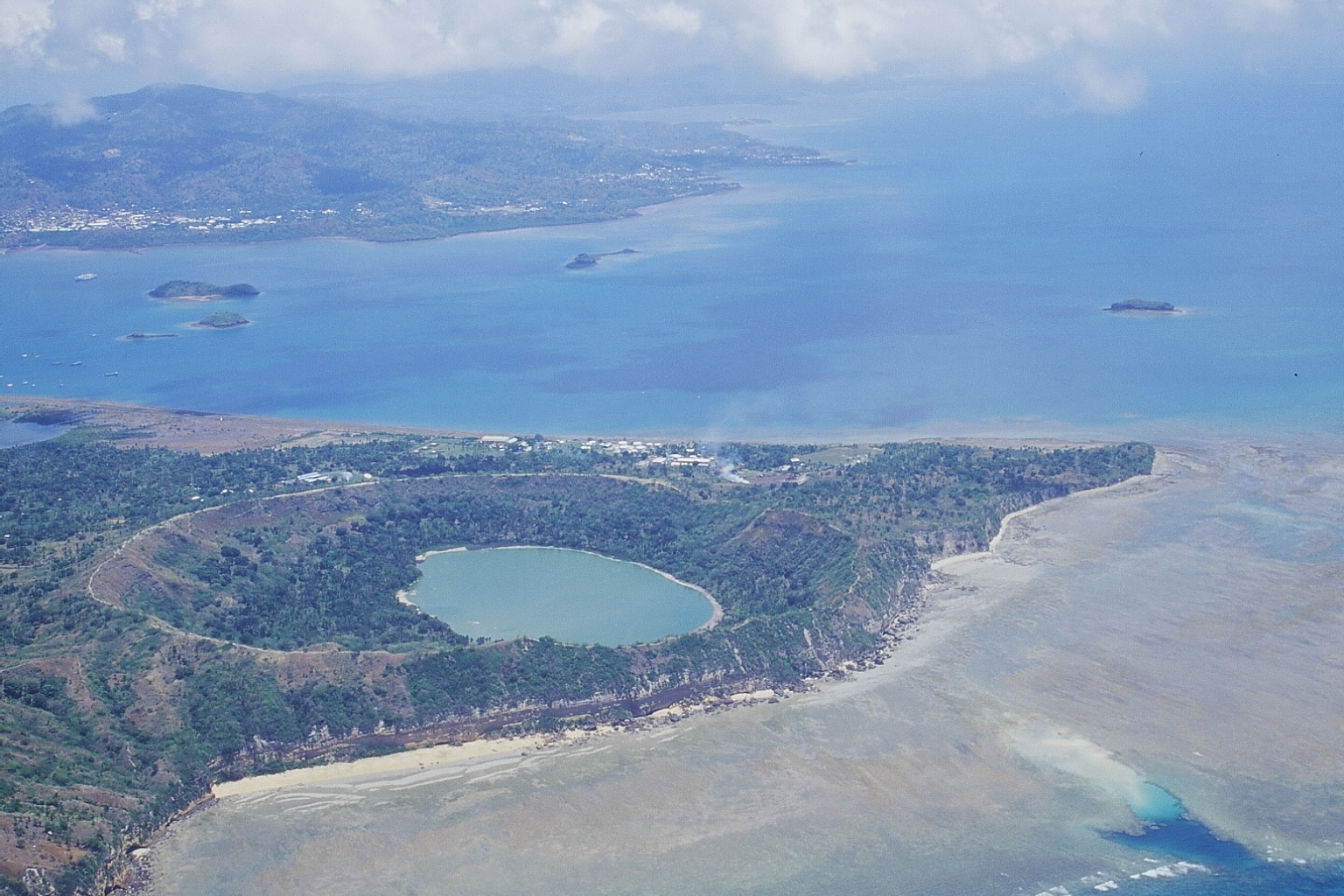
Aerial view of Dziani Dzaha

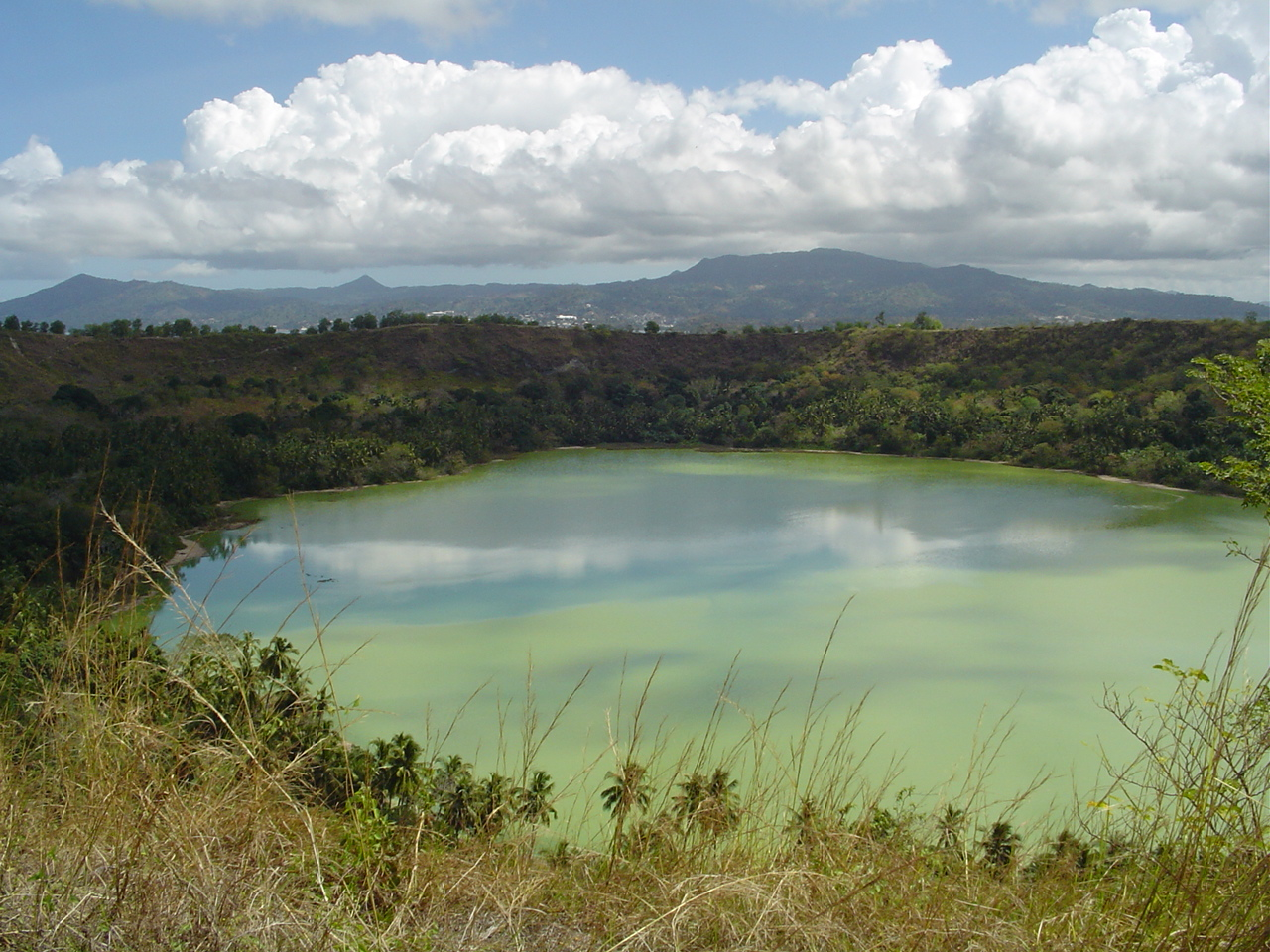
Dziani Dzahal

Dziani Dzaha, or Lake Dziani, is a crater lake on the island of Petite Terre in the French overseas territory of Mayotte. It is known for its underwater lava tube caves and their fabled hidden pirate treasure.

"Dziani Dzaha" is Maore Comorian for "crater lake."
