= Pamanzi =

- Location of Pamanzi in Mayotte

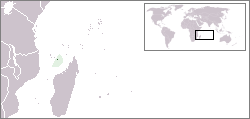

Geography
- Location: Indian Ocean and Mozambique Channel
- Coordinates: 12.783333°S 45.283333°E
- Area: 12.11 km^{2} (4.68 sq mi)

Administration
- France

Petite Terre is also the name of a group of islands in Guadeloupe.

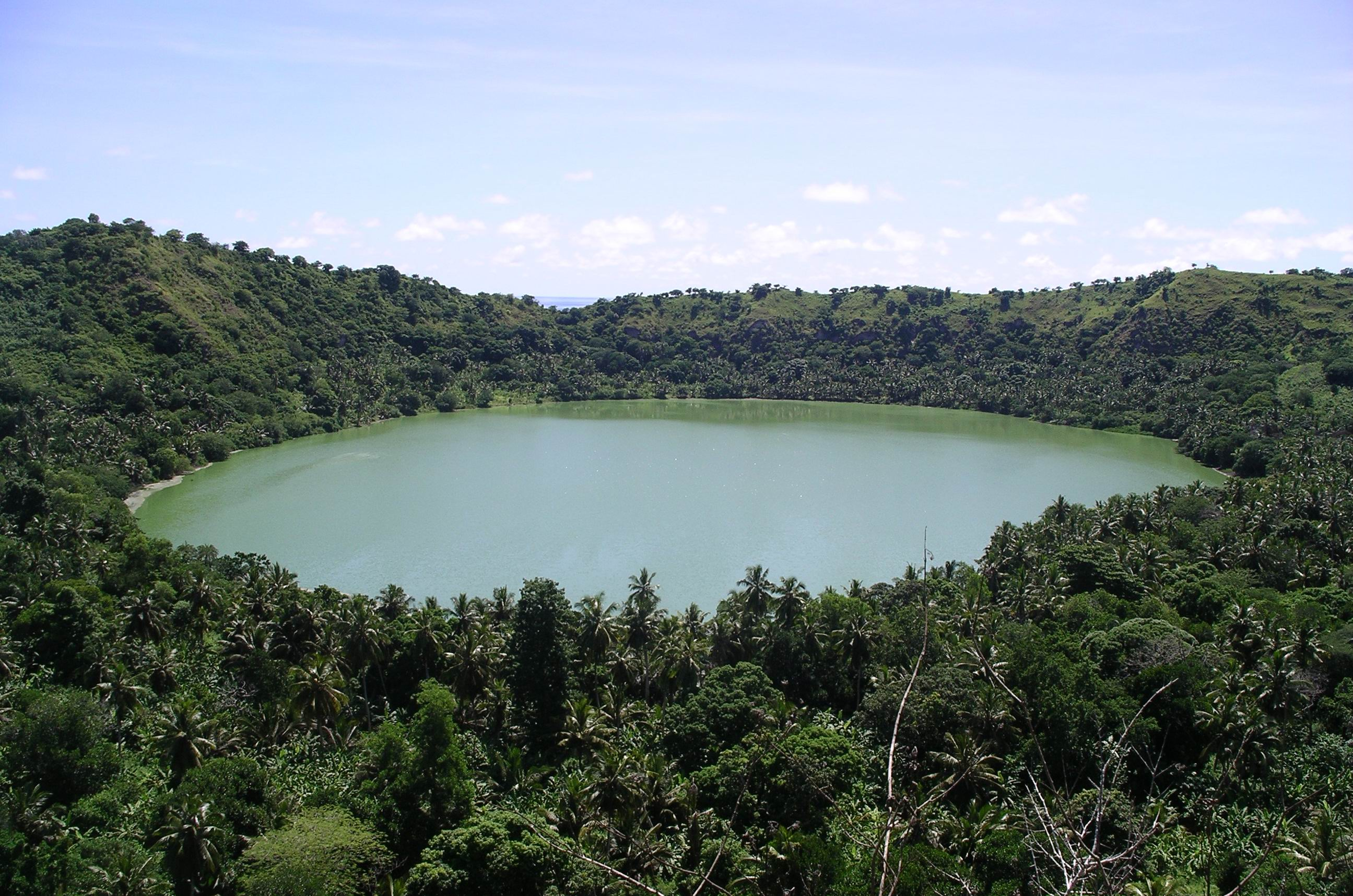
View of Lake Dziani in Pamanzi Island, Mayotte

Pamanzi, also known as Petite-Terre (French pronunciation: [pətit tɛʁ]; literally "Little Land" in French), is an island of Mayotte, an overseas department and region of France, and is Mayotte's second-largest island after Grande-Terre. The northern end of the island features the crater lake Dziani Dzaha, filled with sulfurous water. The communes of Dzaoudzi and Pamandzi are located on Pamanzi.

Occupied by the Allies at the direction of Jan Smuts during the Second World War for its strategic value, Pamanzi was once the most important island with Mayotte's only airport and the capital Dzaoudzi. In 1977, however, Mamoudzou was chosen as the new capital.
