= Lac de Servière =

Lake in Puy-de-Dôme, France

Lac de Servières
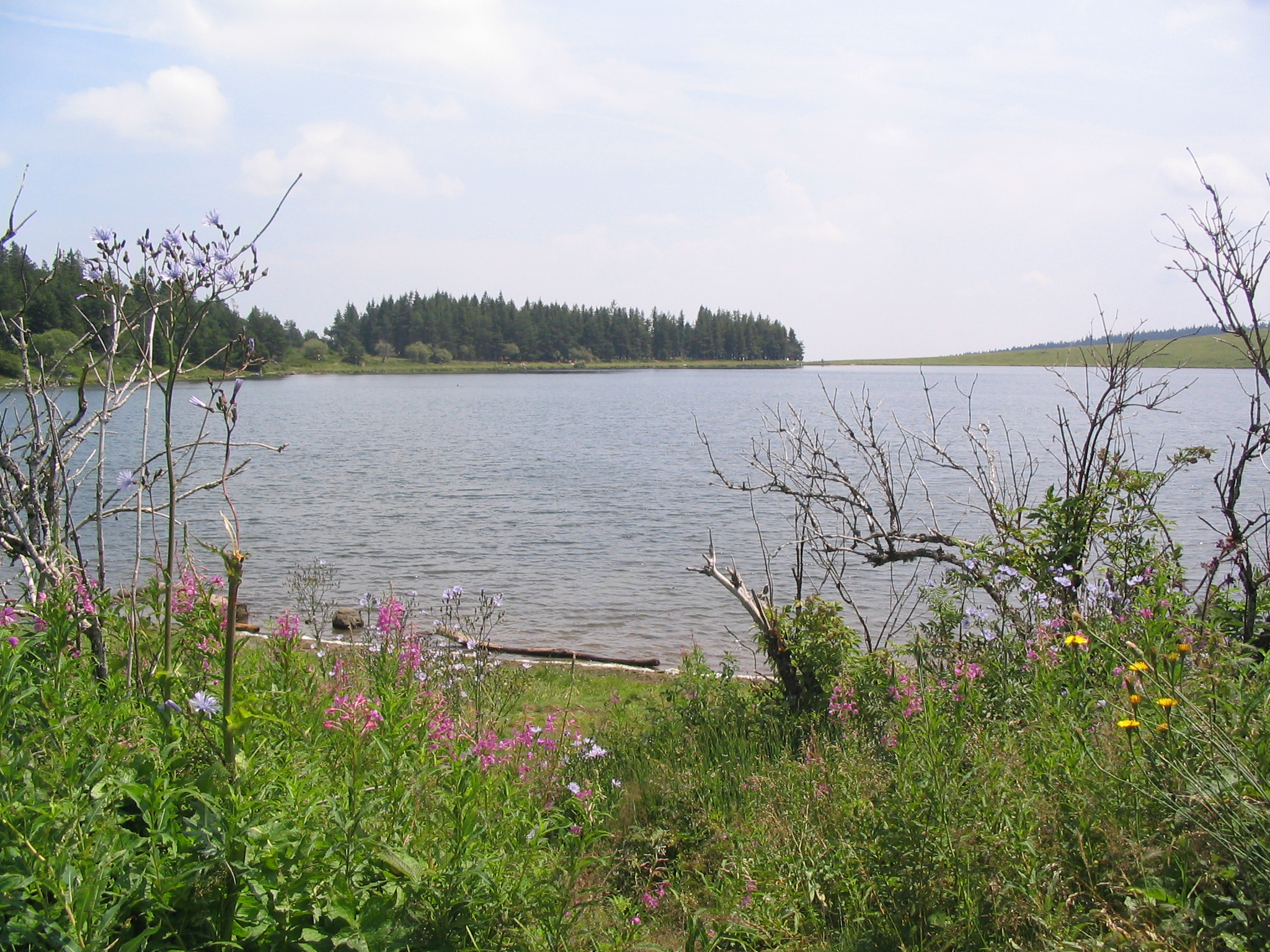

- Location within Auvergne-Rhône-Alpes
- Location: Orcival, Puy-de-Dôme
- Coordinates: 45°39′N 2°52′E
- Type: maar
- Basin countries: France
- Surface area: 0.15 km^{2} (0.058 sq mi)
- Max. depth: 26 m (85 ft)
- Surface elevation: 1,202 m (3,944 ft)

Lac de Servières is a lake in Puy-de-Dôme, France. At an elevation of 1202 m, its surface area is 0.15 km^{2}.
