= Leonard Kniaseff =

Stratovolcano in Davao de Oro, Philippines

Mount Leonard Kniaseff
- Leonard Kniazeff
- Location within Mindanao mainland Location within Philippines

Highest point
- Elevation: 1,190 m (3,900 ft)
- Listing: Active volcano
- Coordinates: 7°22′54″N 126°2′48″E

Geography
- Country: Philippines
- Region: Davao
- Province: Davao de Oro
- City/municipality: Mabini; Maco
- Parent range: Leonard Range

Geology
- Mountain type: Stratovolcano
- Last eruption: c. 80 AD ± 60 years

Mount Leonard Kniaseff, or simply Leonard Kniaseff or Leonard Kniazeff, is an active stratovolcano in the province of Davao de Oro on the island of Mindanao in the Philippines. Inside its caldera is a crater lake called Lake Leonard. Both the mountain and the lake are named after an American prospector who became the first general superintendent of the mining company Samico.

== Description ==
The volcano is an andesitic-to-dacitic stratovolcano complex situated in a river valley surrounded by headlands and the municipalities of Maco, Mawab and Maragusan. Its altitude is 1,190 metres (3,900 ft) or 1,080 metres (3,540 ft) above sea level. The diameter of its base is 17 kilometres (11 mi).

It has a caldera measuring 4 by 5 kilometres (2.5 by 3.1 mi). Occupying part of it is the freshwater Lake Leonard, which has a diameter of 2.03-kilometer (1.26 mi). The Manat and Amacan-Gopod thermal areas are north and five aerial miles south-southwest, respectively, of the lake. The Amacan-Gopod thermal area contains active solfataras, fumaroles and hot springs.

== Volcanic activity ==
Volcanic activity dates back 1.1 million years. The caldera was formed sometime in the late-Pleistocene to Holocene periods. About 290,000 years ago, a series of lava domes was created around Lake Leonard.

Three eruptions are known: at 4092 BC (±122 years), 77 BC (±54) and 80 AD (±60).

== Ecology ==
The lake was once known as Crocodile Lake because of its flourishing population of the reptiles. Then the North Davao Mining Corporation used it for a tailings pond for 11 years before ceasing operation in 1992. It is slowly recovering from the dumping of thousands of tons of toxic wastes into its waters.

A 2023 study found 33 species of lichen around the lake.

== See also ==
- List of active volcanoes in the Philippines
- List of potentially active volcanoes in the Philippines
- List of inactive volcanoes in the Philippines
