= Lake Leonard =

Body of water in the Philippines

- Danaw sa Leonard (Cebuano); Lawa ng Leonard (Filipino)
- Location within the Philippines
- Location: Davao de Oro, Mindanao
- Coordinates: 7°23′41″N 126°3′36″E
- Lake type: crater lake
- Primary inflows: precipitation only
- Primary outflows: tributary of the Hijo River
- Basin countries: Philippines
- Max. length: 1.8 kilometres (1.1 mi)
- Max. width: 0.79 kilometres (0.49 mi)
- Surface area: 6 ha (15 acres)
- Surface elevation: 800 m (2,600 ft)

Lake Leonard is a small freshwater crater lake in Mount Leonard (also known as Leonard Kniaseff), an andesitic-to-dacitic stratovolcano complex in the Leonard Mountain Range which is located 60 kilometres (37 mi) northeast of Davao City in the province of Davao de Oro in the Philippines.

== Origin ==
Volcanic activity began 1.1 million years ago in the area and a series of lava domes in the region surrounding the lake were created in about 290,000 years ago. One of the biggest of these domes collapsed leaving a caldera that in time filled with water and transformed into a freshwater lake capable of sustaining life. Solfataras (fumaroles that emits sulfuric gases) occurring on its southwest rim is evident that under this lake is a sleeping active volcano. Active solfataras, fumaroles, and hot springs are also found in the Amacan-Gopod thermal area south of the lake. The Manat thermal area is located north of Lake Leonard.

== Disturbances and threats ==
The edge of the lake is badly silted as a result of human activities on the upper slopes of the watershed, particularly road construction, shifting cultivation and logging. The disposal of mine tailings is also having a direct adverse impact on the lake's resources. The existing Philippine crocodile (Crocodylus mindorensis) population in the lake is endangered because of the present intensity of human activities; the major threats to the species are accelerated siltation in the lake, poaching, pesticides pollution and the destruction of the natural vegetation on the lake shore.
