= Lac d'Issarlès =

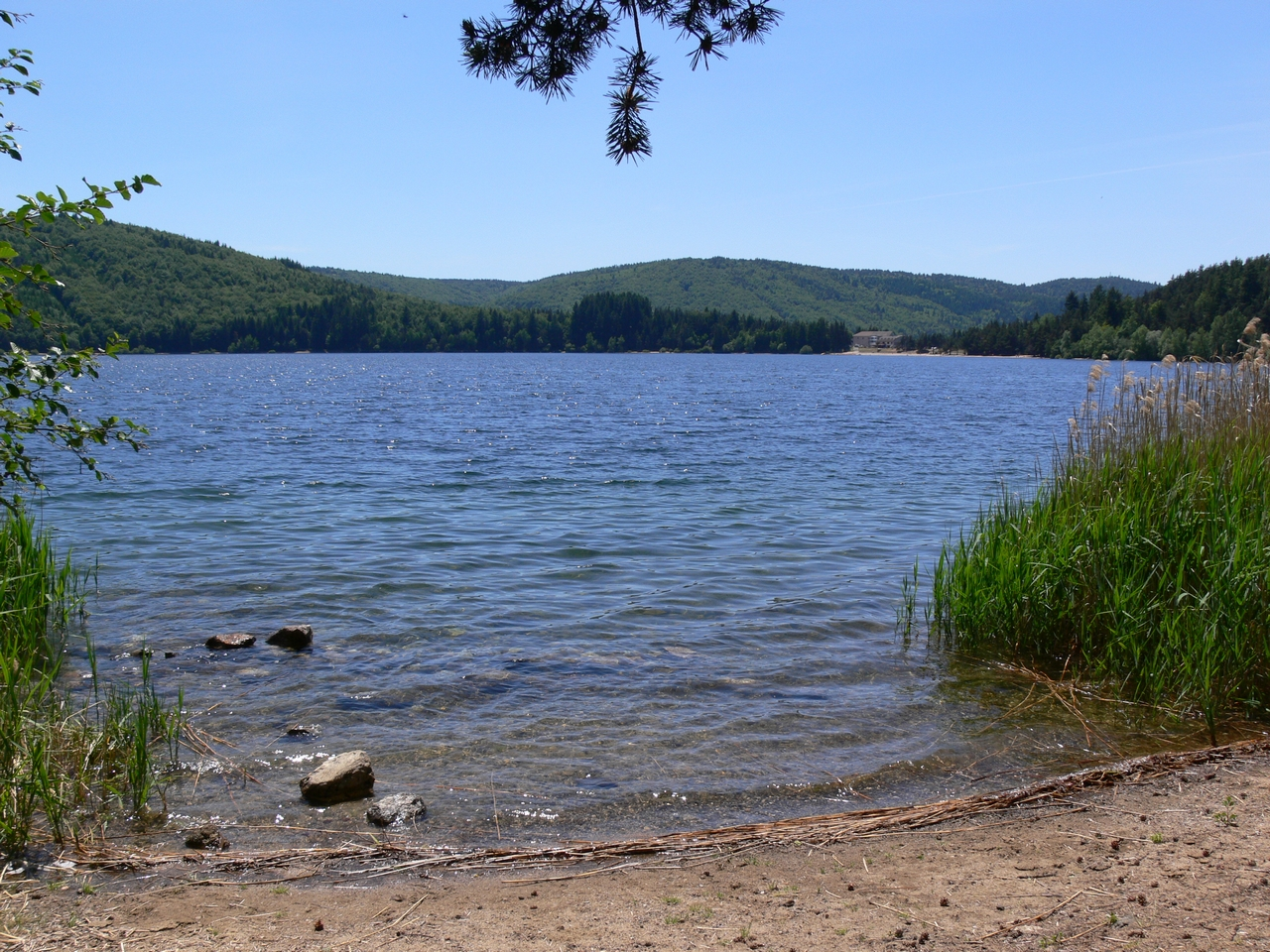

- Location within Auvergne-Rhône-Alpes
- Location: Le Lac-d'Issarlès, Ardèche
- Coordinates: 44°49′4″N 4°4′12″E
- Basin countries: France
- Surface area: 0.9 km^{2} (0.35 sq mi)
- Max. depth: 138 m (453 ft)
- Surface elevation: 1,000 m (3,300 ft)

Lac d'Issarlès is a natural lake formation developed in a volcanic crater, which is located in Le Lac-d'Issarlès, Ardèche, France. At an elevation of 1000 m, its surface area is 90 hectares (0.90 square kilometres).
