= Lac Chauvet =

Lake in France

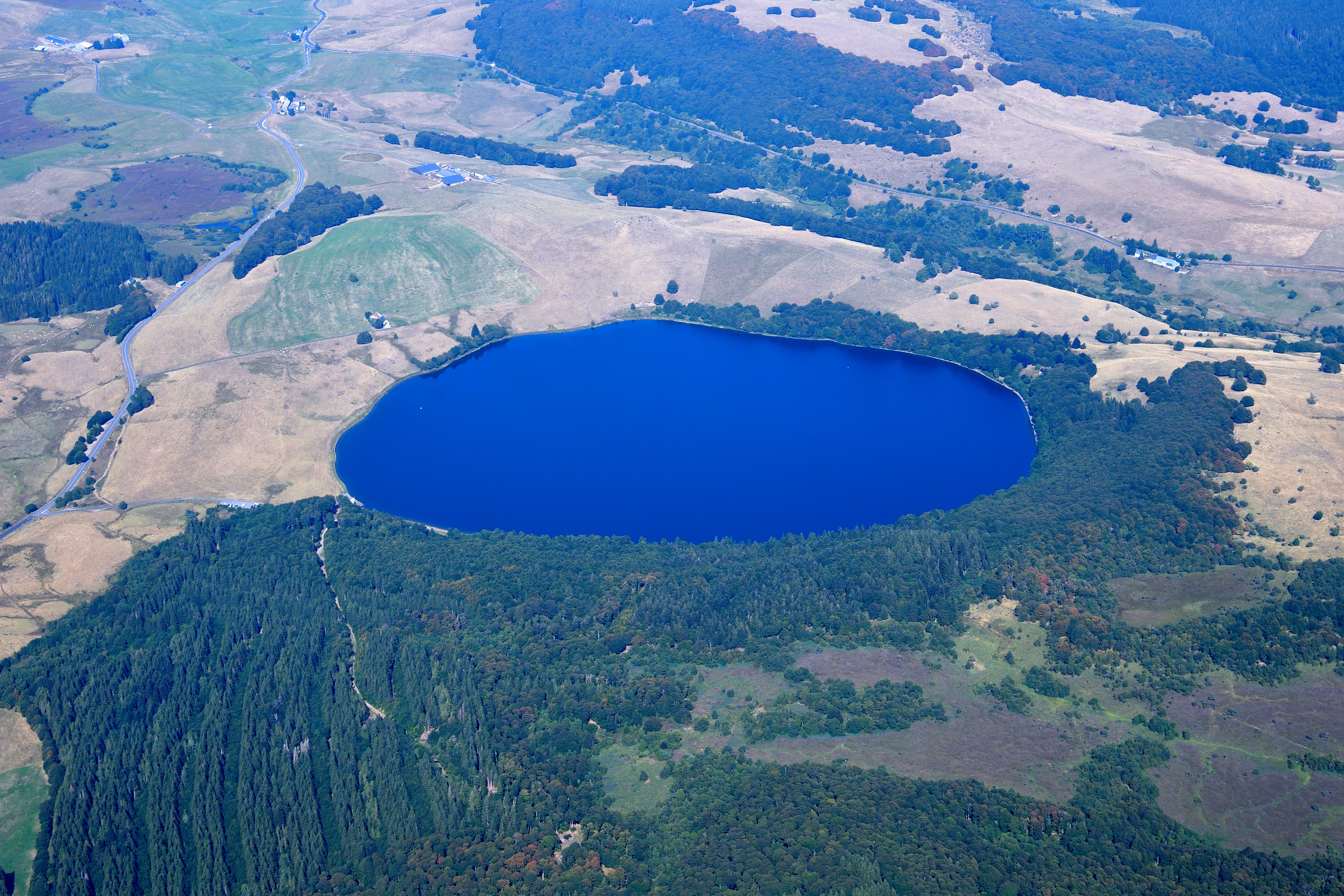

- Location in Auvergne-Rhône-Alpes region
- Location: Picherande, Puy-de-Dôme
- Coordinates: 45°27′36″N 2°49′51″E
- Type: maar
- Basin countries: France
- Surface area: 0.54 km^{2} (0.21 sq mi)
- Max. depth: 86 m (282 ft)
- Surface elevation: 1,176 m (3,858 ft)

Lac Chauvet is a lake in Picherande, Puy-de-Dôme, France. At an elevation of 1176 m, its surface area is 0.54 km².
