= Masaya Volcano =

Active complex volcano in Nicaragua

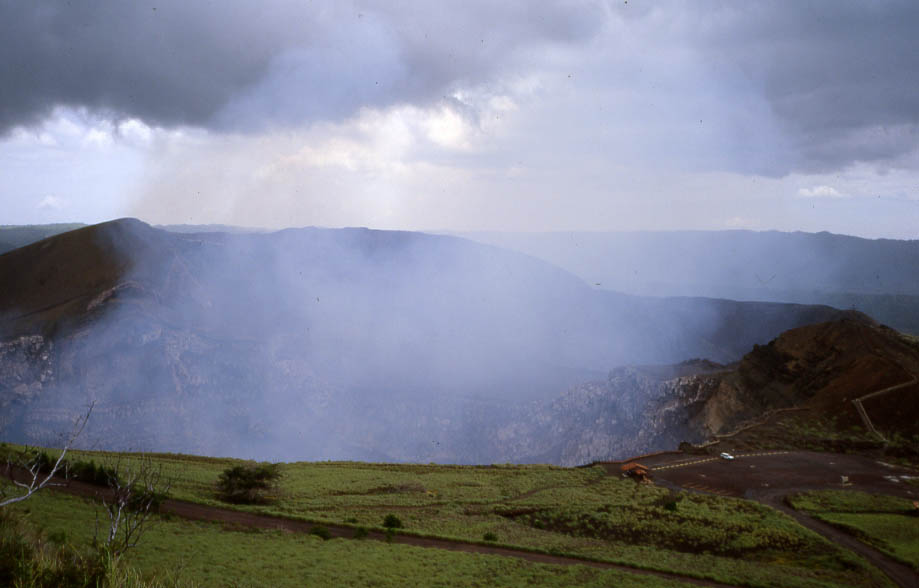
- View of the crater

Highest point
- Elevation: 635 m (2,083 ft)
- Coordinates: 11°58′58″N 86°9′43″W

Geography
- Location: Masaya, Nicaragua
- Parent range: Central American Volcanic Belt

Geology
- Rock age: ~9,000 years
- Mountain type: Caldera
- Volcanic arc: Central America Volcanic Arc
- Last eruption: 2015–present

Masaya (Spanish: Volcán Masaya), also known historically by its aboriginal name Popogatepe in Nawat, is a caldera located in Masaya, Nicaragua, 20 km (12 mi) south of the capital Managua. It is Nicaragua's first and largest national park, and one of 78 protected areas of Nicaragua. The complex volcano is composed of a nested set of calderas and craters, the largest of which is Las Sierras shield volcano and caldera. Within this caldera lies a sub-vent, which is Masaya Volcano sensu stricto. The vent is a shield type composed of basaltic lavas and tephras and includes a summit crater. This hosts Masaya caldera, formed 2,500 years ago by an 8 km^{3} (1.9 cu mi) basaltic ignimbrite eruption. Inside this caldera a new basaltic complex has grown from eruptions mainly on a semi-circular set of vents that include the Masaya and Nindiri cones. The latter host the pit craters of Masaya, Santiago, Nindiri and San Pedro. Observations in the walls of the pit craters indicate that there have been several episodes of cone and pit crater formation.

Masaya continually emits large amounts of sulfur dioxide gas (from the active Santiago crater) and volcanologists study this (amongst other signs) to better understand the behavior of the volcano and also evaluate the impact of acid rain and the potential for health problems.

== History ==
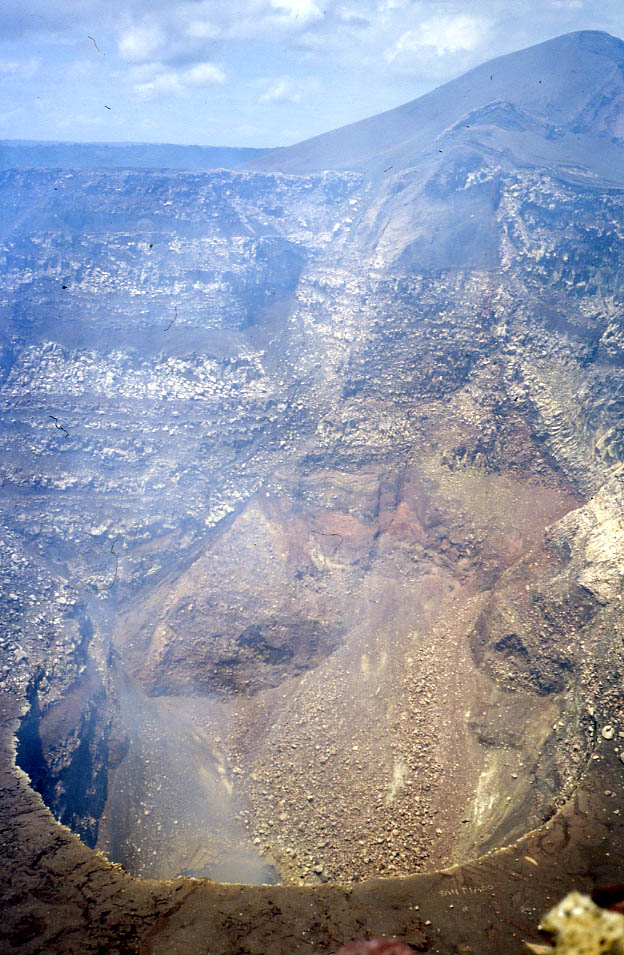
Santiago crater

The floor of Masaya caldera is mainly covered by poorly vegetated ʻaʻā lava, indicating resurfacing within the past 1,000 or so years, but only two lava flows have erupted since the sixteenth century. The first, in 1670, was an overflow from the Nindiri crater, which at that time hosted a 1-km-wide lava lake. The other, in 1772, issued from a fissure on the flank of the Masaya cone. Since 1772, lava has appeared at the surface only in the Santiago pit crater (presently active and persistently degassing) and possibly within Nindiri crater in 1852. A lake occupies the far eastern end of the caldera.

Although the recent activity of Masaya has largely been dominated by continuous degassing from an occasionally lava-filled pit crater, a number of discrete explosive events have occurred in the last 50 years. One such event occurred on November 22, 1999, which was recognised from satellite data. A hot spot appeared on satellite imagery, and there was a possible explosion. On April 23, 2001, the crater exploded and formed a new vent in the bottom of the crater. The explosion sent rocks with diameters up to 60 cm (24 in) which travelled up to 500 m (1,600 ft) from the crater. Vehicles in the visitors area were damaged and one person was injured. On October 4, 2003, an eruption cloud was reported at Masaya. The plume rose to a height of about 4.6 km (2.9 mi). In 2008, the mountain erupted spewing ash and steam. This volcano is monitored by the Deep Earth Carbon Degassing Project. Volcanic gas emissions from this volcano are measured by a Multi-Component Gas Analyzer System, which detects pre-eruptive degassing of rising magmas, improving prediction of volcanic activity.

On March 4, 2020, tightrope daredevil Nik Wallenda walked on a steel cable over the caldera.

== National park ==
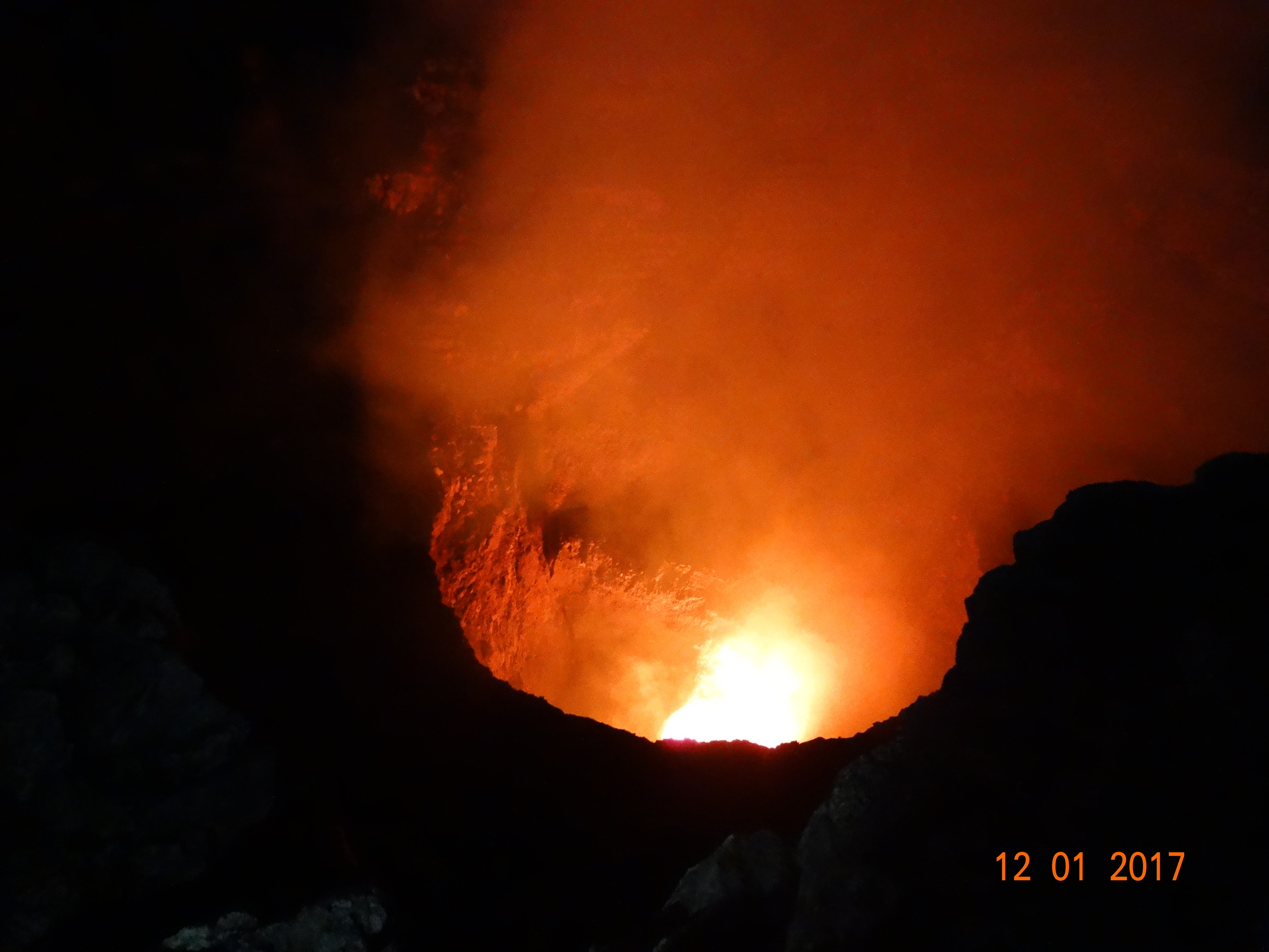
Masaya Volcano

In 1979, Masaya became Nicaragua's first national park, named Masaya Volcano National Park (Parque Nacional Volcán Masaya). The park has an area of 54 km^{2} (21 sq mi) and includes two volcanoes and five craters, as well as a range of elevations between 100 and 630 meters above sea level. In the park is a lava tube formed by lava flows; one can find bats and look inside and observe the glowing lava in the dark crater mouth of the volcano.

== Geologic setting ==
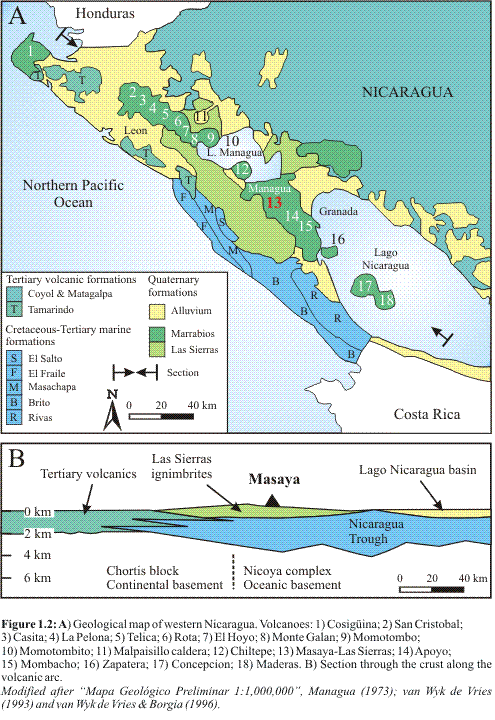
Geological map

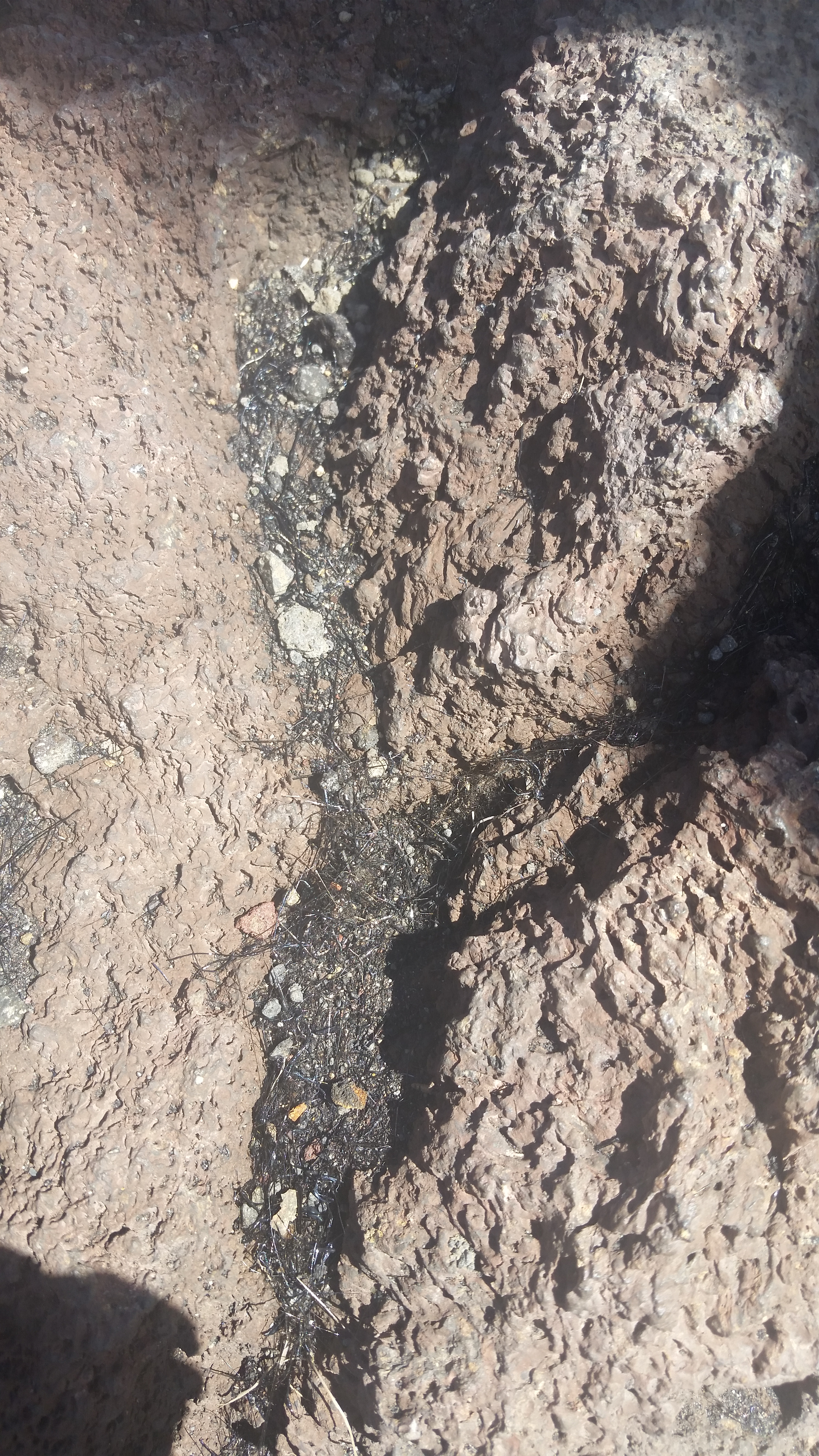
Pele's hair, Santiago Crater, Nindiri Volcano

Masaya is one of 18 distinct volcanic centers that make up the Nicaraguan portion of the Central American Volcanic Belt (CAVF). Formed by the subduction of the Cocos Plate beneath the Caribbean Plate, along the Mesoamerican trench, the CAVF runs from volcán Tacaná in Guatemala to Irazú in Costa Rica. In western Nicaragua, the CAVF bisects the Nicaraguan Depression from Cosigüina volcano in the northwest to Maderas volcano in Lago Nicaragua. The Interior highlands to the northeast make up the majority of Nicaragua. Western Nicaragua consists of four principal geological provinces paralleling the Mesoamerican trench: 1. Pre-Cretaceous to Cretaceous ophiolitic suite; 2. Tertiary basins; 3. Tertiary volcanics; and the 4. Active Quaternary volcanic range.

An ophiolitic suite is found in the Nicoya Complex, which is made up of cherts, graywackes, tholeiitic pillow lavas and basaltic agglomerates. It is intruded by gabbroic, diabasic, and dioritic rocks. The Cretaceous–Tertiary basin is made up of five formations of mainly marine origin. The Rivas and Brito formations are uplifted to the southeast and are overlain in the northwest by a slightly tilted marine near-shore sequence, the El Fraile formation. This in turn passes north into the undeformed Tamarindo formation, a sequence of shallow marine, lacustrine and terrestrial sediments interspersed with ignimbrites. Northeast of the Nicaraguan Depression, the Coyol and Matagalpa formations, run from Honduras to Costa Rica and still show evidence of some volcanic centres, distinguishable as constructional landforms.

Quaternary volcanic rocks are found mainly in the Nicaraguan Depression and form two major groups: the Marrabios and the Sierras formations. The Marrabios Cordillera starts in the northwest with Cosiguina volcano and continues to the southeast with San Cristobal, Casitas, La Pelona, Telica and Rota. The Hoyo, Monte Galan, Momotombo and Momotombito volcanoes are built upon ignimbrite deposits from the nearby Malpaisillo caldera. South-east of Lake Managua lie Chiltepe, the Nejapa alignment, Masaya, Apoyo and Mombacho which overlie the Sierras ignimbrites, erupted from the Sierras Caldera surrounding Masaya volcano. Further south in Lake Cocibolca (or Lake Nicaragua), Zapatera, Concepcion and Maderas volcanoes mark the end of Nicaraguan section of the CAVF.

== See also ==
- List of volcanoes in Nicaragua
