= Cordillera de los Maribios =

Mountain range in Nicaragua

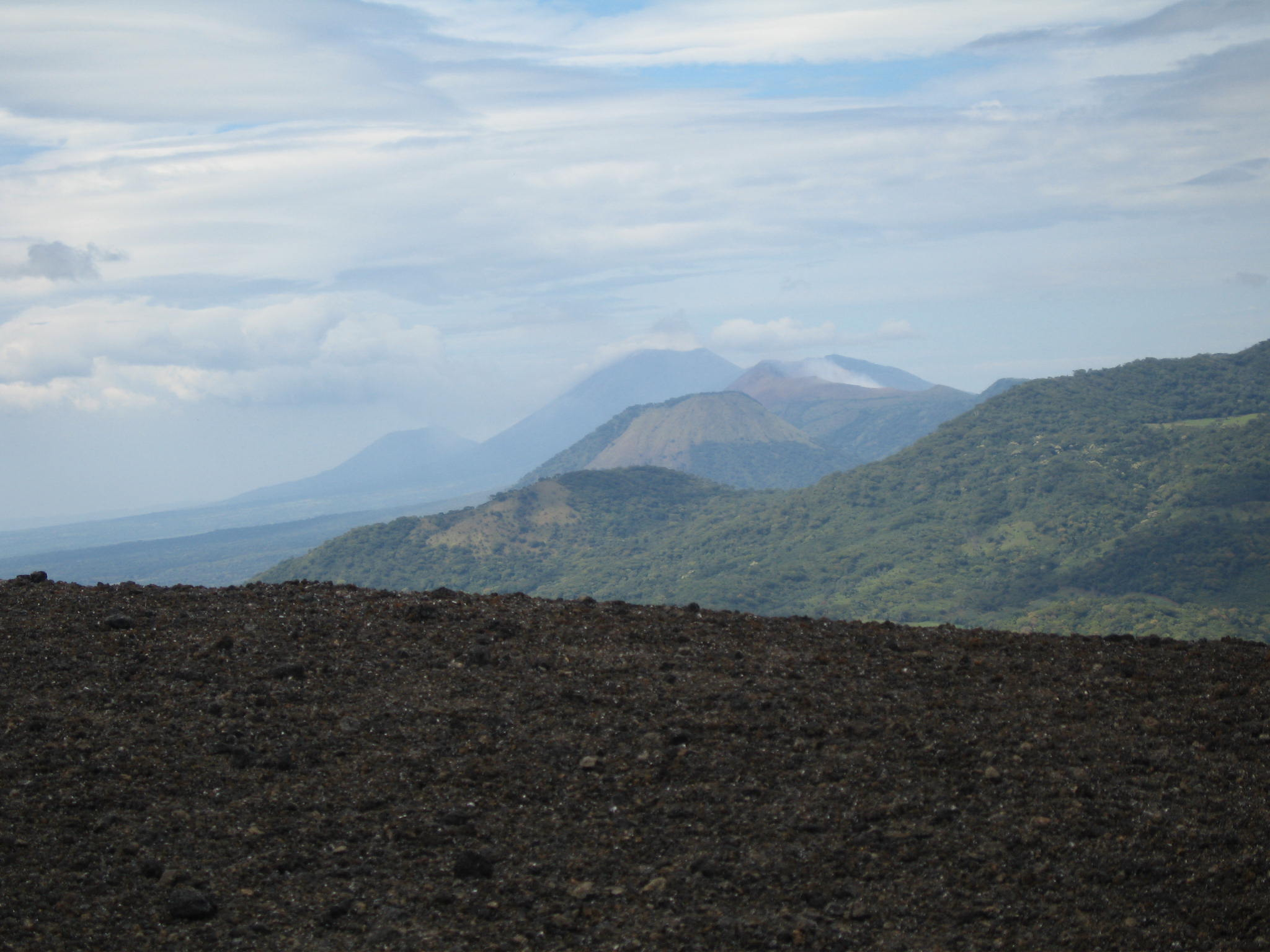
Cordillera de Maribios

Cordillera de Maribios (or Cordillera de Marrabios) is a mountain range in León and Chinandega departments, western Nicaragua, at 12.56°N 86.78°W and about 64.4 km (40 mi) long. It is a volcanic range comprised most notably by San Cristóbal 1745 m, Pilas 983 m, Telica 1060 m, Cerro Negro 450 m, and Momotombo 1258 m.
