= Las Lajas =

Las Lajas may refer to:

- Las Lajas (volcano), a volcano in the central part of Nicaragua
- Las Lajas, Catamarca, a village in Argentina
- Las Lajas, Neuquén, a town in Argentina
- Las Lajas, Cuba, a settlement in Guantánamo
- Las Lajas, Honduras, a town
- Las Lajas, Chiriquí, a corregimiento in Panama
- Las Lajas, Panamá Oeste, a corregimiento in Panama
- Las Lajas Canton, El Oro Province, Ecuador
- Las Lajas Shrine, a cathedral in Ipiales, Colombia

== See also ==
- Lajas (disambiguation)
