= Lajas =

Lajas may refer to:

- Lajas, Cuba (Cienfuegos province)
- Lajas, small barrio in Consolación del Sur, Cuba
- Lajas, Puerto Rico, a municipality of Puerto Rico
- Lajas, Lajas, a barrio in Lajas, Puerto Rico
- Lajas barrio-pueblo, a barrio-pueblo in Lajas, Puerto Rico
- Lajas Arriba, a barrio in Lajas, Puerto Rico

== See also ==
- Lajes (disambiguation)
- Las Lajas (disambiguation)
