= List of volcanoes in Nicaragua =

This is a list of active and extinct volcanoes in Nicaragua.

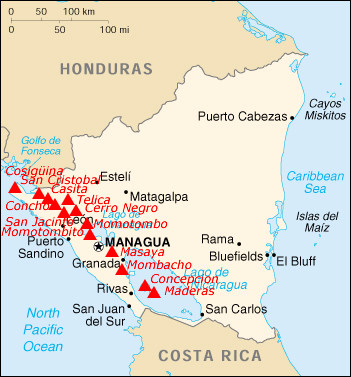
A map of Nicaragua's volcanoes.

== Volcanoes ==
Name	Elevation		Location	Last eruption
Name	meters	feet	Coordinates	Last eruption
Apoyeque	518	1699	12.242°N 86.342°W	50 BC
Ciguatepe	603	1978	12.53°N 86.142°W	Holocene
Cerro Negro	728	2388	12.506°N 86.702°W	1999
Concepción	1700	5577	11.538°N 85.622°W	2024
Cosigüina	872	2861	12.98°N 87.57°W	1859
Estelí	899	2949	13.17°N 86.40°W	Holocene
Granada	300	984	11.92°N 85.98°W	10,000 BC
Lajas	926	3038	12.30°N 85.73°W	Holocene
Las Pilas	1088	3570	12.495°N 86.688°W	1954
Maderas	1394	4573	11.446°N 85.515°W	Holocene
Masaya	635	2083	11.984°N 86.161°W	continuing as of 2025
Mombacho	1344	4409	11.862°N 85.968°W	1570
Momotombo	1297	4255	12.422°N 86.540°W	2015
Nejapa-Miraflores	360	1181	12.12°N 86.32°W	Holocene
Rota	832	2730	12.55°N 86.75°W	Holocene
San Cristóbal	1745	5725	12.702°N 87.004°W	2024
Telica	1061	3481	12.602°N 86.845°W	2025
Azul	201	659	12.53°N 83.87°W	Holocene
Zapatera	629	2064	11.73°N 85.82°W	Holocene

== See also ==
- Central America Volcanic Arc
- List of volcanoes in Costa Rica
- List of volcanoes in El Salvador
- List of volcanoes in Guatemala
- List of volcanoes in Honduras
- List of volcanoes in Panama
