= Maderas =

Volcano in Nicaragua

Maderas (volcano)
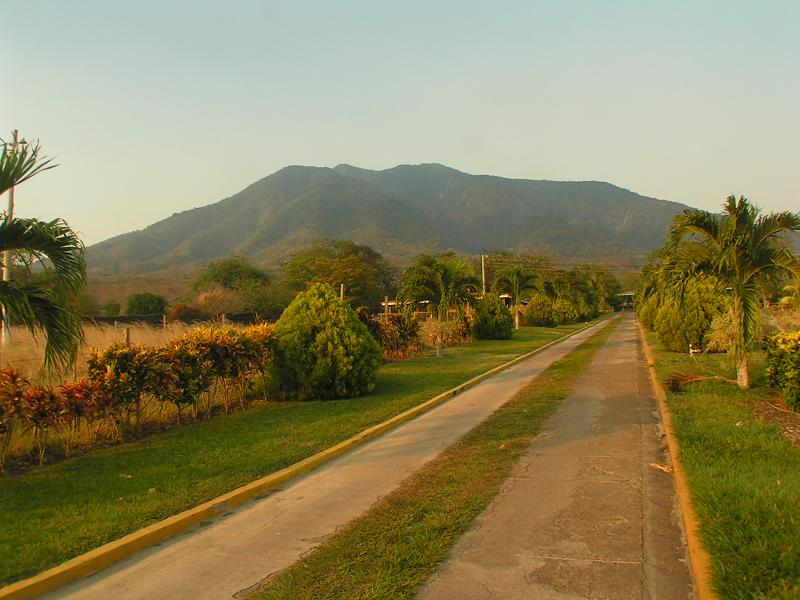
- Maderas, as seen from the south (April 2008)

Highest point
- Elevation: 1,394 m (4,573 ft)
- Coordinates: 11°26′46″N 85°30′54″W

Geography
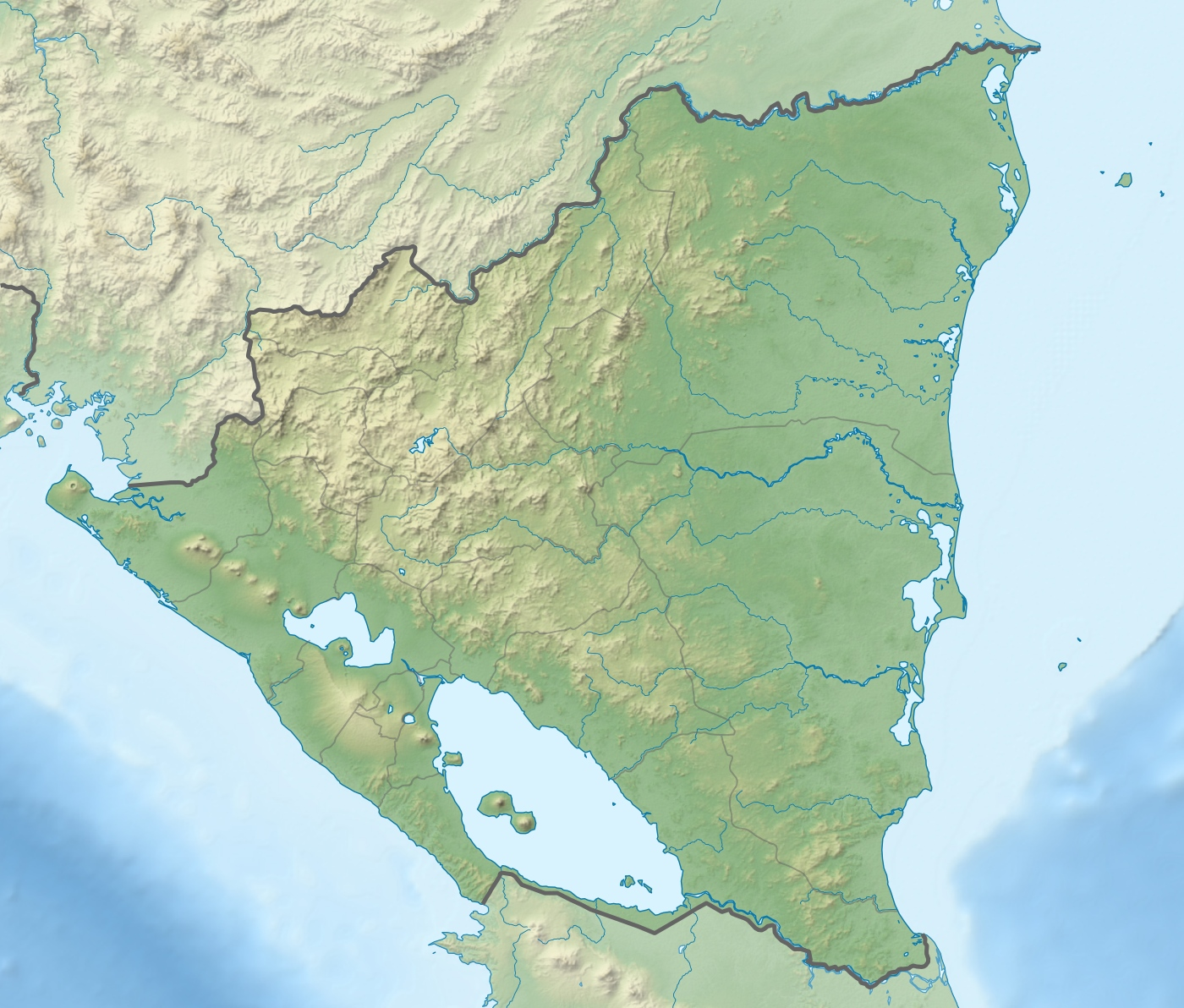
- Location within Nicaragua
- Location: Rivas Department, Nicaragua

Geology
- Mountain type: Stratovolcano
- Volcanic arc: Central America Volcanic Arc
- Last eruption: Unknown

Maderas (Spanish: Volcán Maderas), also known by its aboriginal name Omeyateite from the Nawat language, is a volcano in Nicaragua. With a height of 1,394 metres (4,573 ft), it is the smaller of the two volcanoes which make up the island of Ometepe in Lake Nicaragua. Unlike Concepción, the other volcano on the island, Maderas has not been active in historical times. Its crater contains a crater lake.

The slopes of Maderas are one of the few places on the Pacific side of Nicaragua where cloud forests grow. The only other place where this ecosystem can be found is the Mombacho volcano. Cloud forests are characterized by a rich plant and animal life, made possible by the high levels of humidity in the climate. Prehistoric petroglyphs have been found at the Maderas volcano.

Climbing to the top of the volcano is a popular tourist activity. Tourists are strongly encouraged by local guiding companies to hire a guide, but the trail from the common starting point at Finca Magdalena is easy to see the entire way to the top. The hike to the top of the crater can be difficult, with steep inclines that become muddy during rainy weather. It rains often on Ometepe Island, so a slippery climb is likely, even in the dry season. The round-trip hike takes between 6 and 9 hours and changes from dry forest to humid forest to cloud forest.

There are a number of animal species that dwell on the volcano, including the white-faced monkey, mountain crab, howler monkeys, and a number of butterflies including the blue morphos.

== See also ==
- List of volcanoes in Nicaragua
