= San Cristóbal Volcano =

Highest volcano in Nicaragua

San Cristóbal
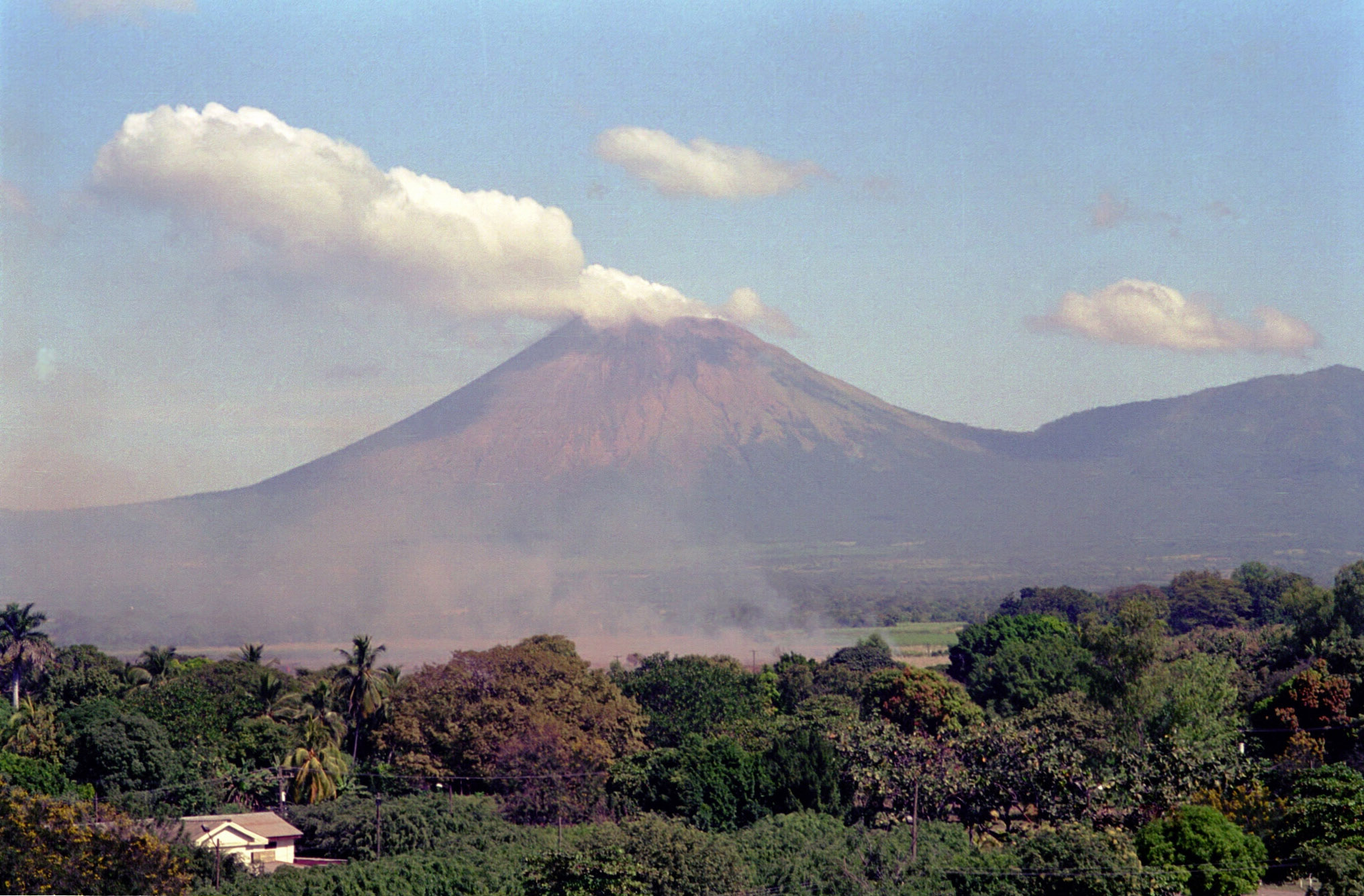
- San Cristóbal from the Ingenio San Antonio sugar mill in Chichigalpa, Nicaragua

Highest point
- Elevation: 1,746 m (5,728 ft)
- Coordinates: 12°42′07″N 87°00′14″W

Geography
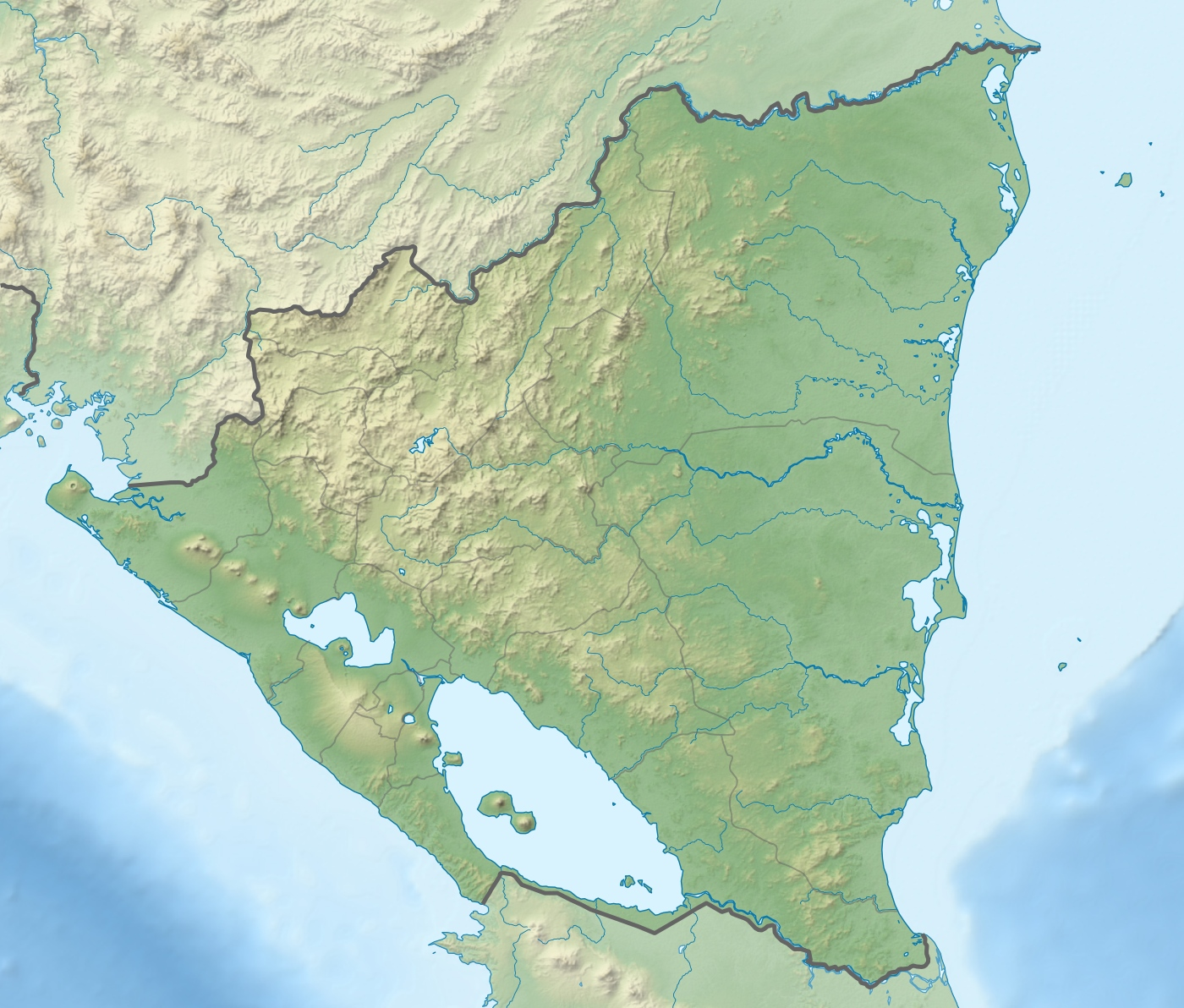
- Location within Nicaragua
- Location: Chinandega Department, Nicaragua
- Parent range: Cordillera Los Maribios

Geology
- Mountain type: Stratovolcano
- Volcanic arc: Central America Volcanic Arc
- Last eruption: July 2023

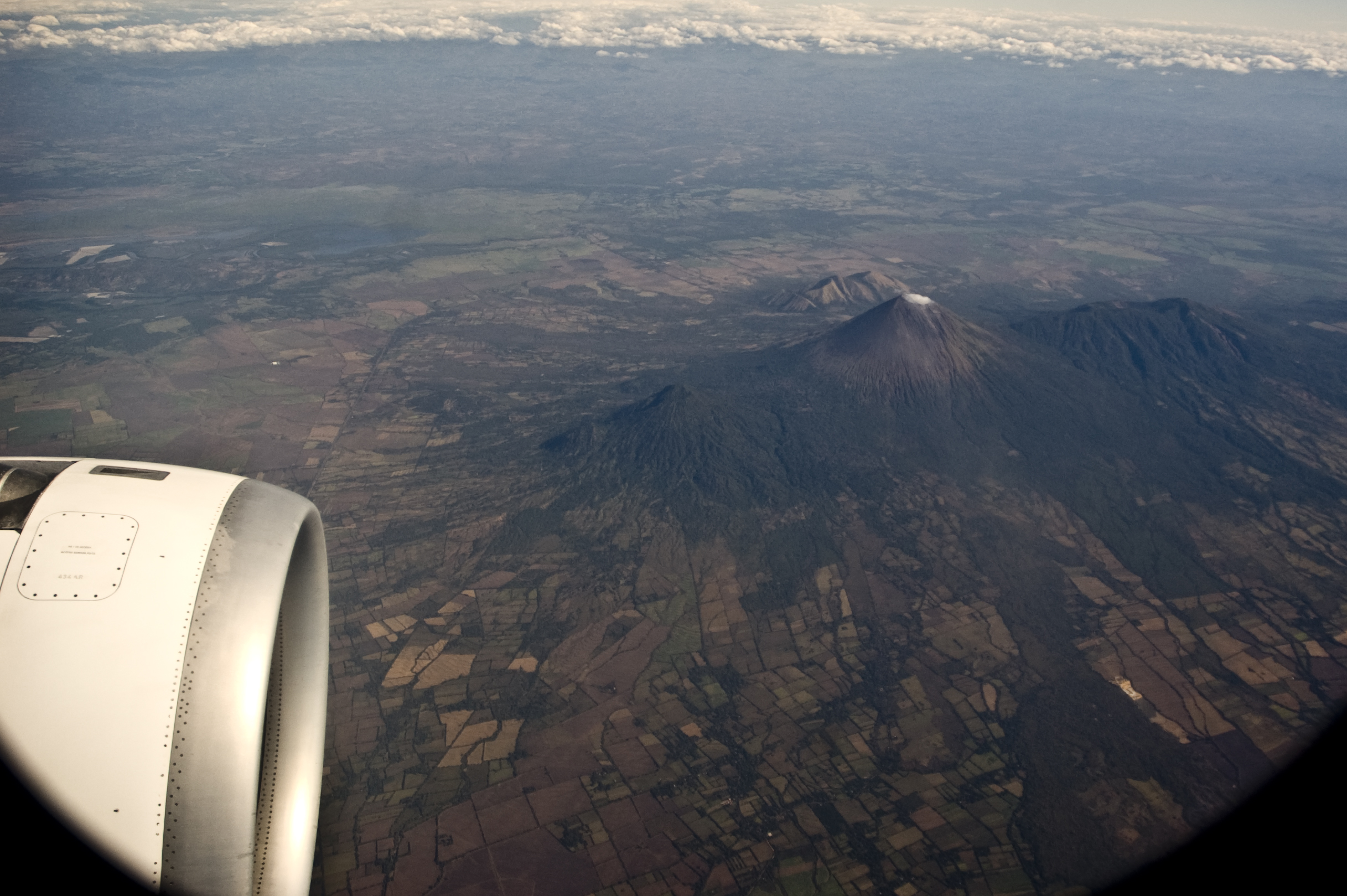
The San Cristóbal volcanic complex

San Cristóbal Volcano (Spanish: Volcán San Cristóbal), also known by its aboriginal name Tepemesquián from the Nawat language, is the highest volcano in Nicaragua at 1,745 m (5,725 ft). Located near the northwest corner of the country, close to the border with Honduras, it forms a backdrop to the city of Chichigalpa, in the department of Chinandega. It is also among the most active volcanoes in Nicaragua.

San Cristóbal is part of a 5-member volcanic complex that bears the same name. Chonco is 4 km to the west, and Moyotepe 4 km to the north east. Joined to the volcano's eastern flank is Volcán Casitas, which buried a village with a catastrophic landslide in 1998. The scars from that landslide are still visible today. Finally, La Pelona is on the east end of the complex.

== Physical features ==
San Cristóbal is the youngest volcano in its complex. It is a nearly symmetrical stratovolcano, rising in a distinctive cone shape. The SW slope is the longest, and the crater rim on that side rises 140 m above the NE end due to prevailing trade winds that distribute tephra to the SW.

The crater is 500 × 600 m in size. While the volcano was at one point covered in tropical forests, the large quantities of gas and smoke that it emits constantly have killed off much of the vegetation.

== Eruptive history ==
- 1635: Erupted strongly enough to merit preservation in historical accounts.
- August 1919: Produced loud noises and light tremors that were felt in surrounding areas.
- May 1971: Produced bangs and explosions.
- March 1976: Produced a high, continuous column of smoke, several light tremors, and explosions that occurred every three minutes.
- c. December 1986: Marked expulsion of gases
- c. January 1987: Expelled large quantities of gas.
- May 1994: Entered into a new eruptive period, expelling gases, ash, and sand, and also producing light tremors.
- December 1999: Expelled gas, ash, and sand.
- May, August 2001: Reactivated.
- April 2006: Moderate phreatic eruption.
- July 2008: Rumbled with a series of small explosions, and expelled gas.
- September 2009: Explosion and moderate ash expulsion.
- September 2012: Three big explosions, expelled gas, ash and sand to 5,000 metres, following the 2012 Costa Rica earthquake.
- December 25, 2012 and continuing into 2013: elevated seismic activity and multiple eruptions over the next few days.
- April 11, 2014: Gas plume that may contain ash drifted West about 20 km.
- July 20, 2014: Two explosions that occurred at 1:30 P.M. and 2:13 P.M. local time produced small plumes of ash that rose 100 meters.
- March 9, 2021: Moderate ash expulsion, impacting the town of Chinandega.

== Current activity ==
San Cristóbal remains quite active, continuously expelling copious amounts of gas and smoke. As recent as September 2009, it was reported that ash was falling in nearby towns. In September 2012 it erupted again, spewing ash up to four kilometres (2.5 miles) into the atmosphere, resulting in the evacuation of around 3000 people in the surrounding area.

A further eruption took place, starting on December 25, 2012, and continuing into 2013, causing the evacuation of hundreds of locals.

On Wednesday, March 10, 2021, the volcano had an eruption and sent ash about 10,000 feet into the air and blanketed several towns in ash.

On July 5, 2023, an eruption sent ash about 2 km into the air. Pyroclastic flows were seen near the summit.

== See also ==
- List of volcanoes in Nicaragua
