= Zapatera =

Shield volcano in southern Nicaragua

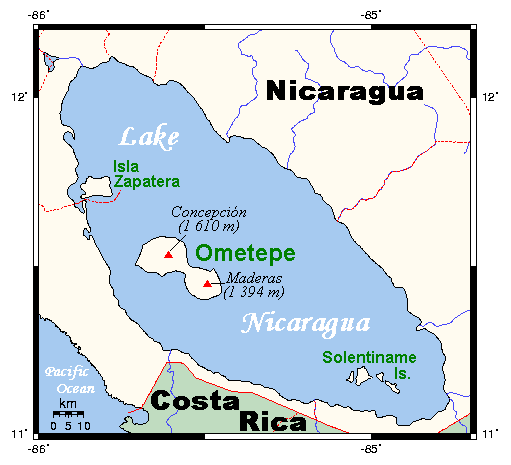

Highest point
- Elevation: 629 m (2,064 ft)
- Coordinates: 11°44′N 85°49′W

Geography
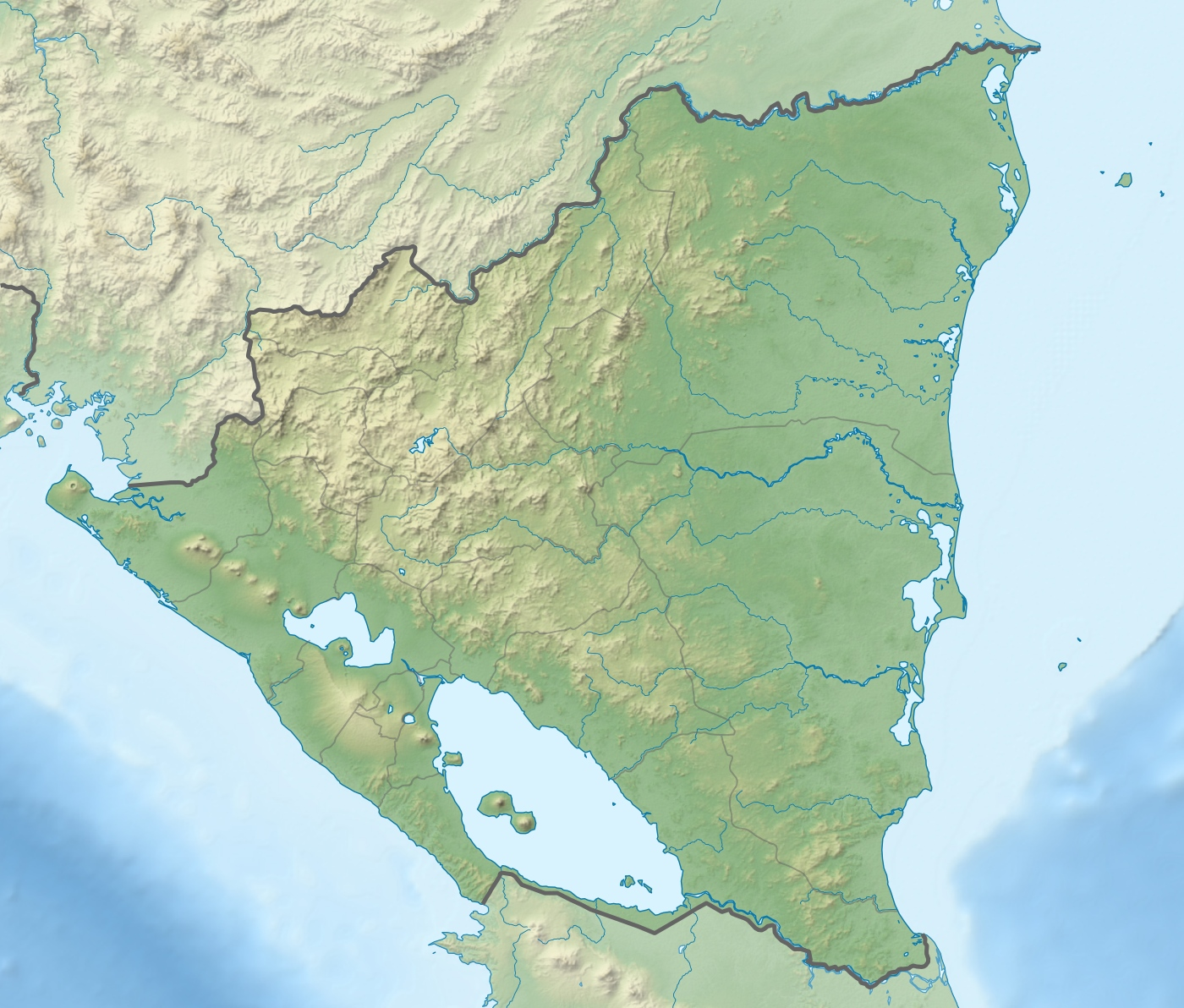
- Location within Nicaragua
- Location: Granada Department, Nicaragua

Geology
- Mountain type: Shield volcano
- Volcanic arc: Central America Volcanic Arc
- Last eruption: Unknown

Zapatera is a shield volcano located in the southern part of Nicaragua. It forms the island of Isla Zapatera in the Lake Nicaragua. Isla Zapatera constitutes one of 78 protected areas of Nicaragua.

As of 1850, Zapatera was described "uninhabited" by British writer John Baily. The archaeological site of Zapatera is located on the island.

== See also ==
- List of volcanoes in Nicaragua
