= Volcán Telica Rota Natural Reserve =

Nature reserve in Nicaragua

Coordinates: 12.62469°N 86.80212°W

Volcán Telica Rota Natural Reserve is a nature reserve in Nicaragua. It is located in the municipality of Telica in the department of León; it was established on May 2, 1980 and has an area of 9,808 hectares. It is one of the 78 reserves that are under official protection in the country.

Telica Volcano is situated within the confines of the Natural Reserve Telica-Rota Volcanic Complex, which encompasses a collection of volcanic formations. The prominent features within this complex include Telica Volcano and Rota Volcano, while the Santa Ana Volcano, Cerro Agüero Volcano, San Jacinto Volcano, Tamarindo Volcano, and the Hervideros of San Jacinto hold lesser significance.

Telica Volcano, being one of the active volcanoes in the region, exhibits ongoing volcanic activity. Although its last recorded eruption occurred in 1948, future eruptions are possible, based on the frequent seismic activities observed in the area. The volcano is visually characterized by a smoky appearance when viewed from a distance. It serves as a reminder of the dynamic nature of volcanic systems and the potential for renewed activity in the future.
