= Chiltepe Peninsula Natural Reserve =

Nature reserve in Nicaragua

- Reserva Natural Península de Chiltepe
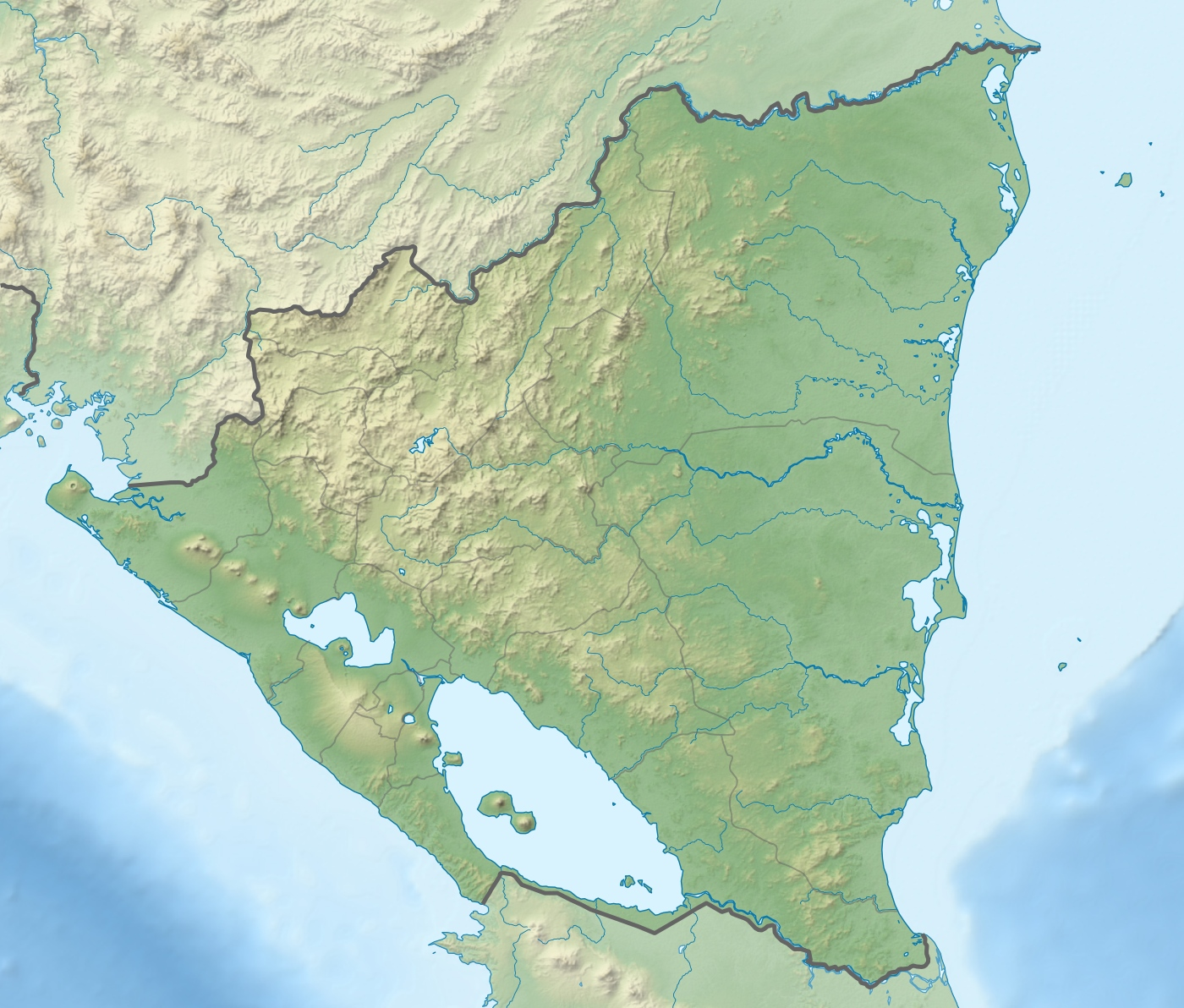
- Location within Nicaragua
- Coordinates: 12°15′00″N 86°21′00″W

Chiltepe Peninsula Natural Reserve (Spanish: Reserva Natural Península de Chiltepe) is a nature reserve in Nicaragua. It is one of the 78 reserves which are officially under protection in the country.

Located on the south shore of Lake Managua, it is 15 kilometers Northwest of Managua, the capital, and consequently a popular destination for visitors from the city.

The peninsula was formed by Apoyeque stratovolcano, one of whose domes is Chiltepe volcano (Volcán Chiltepe).

Local fauna includes coyotes, deer, raccoons, rabbits and other small mammals, as well as iguanas and lizards, which have been disappearing under pressure from hunting. At its coasts live ducks, herons, cormorants, and such birds as sargentillos (Agelaius), cowbirds (Molothrus Tangavius), Clariona (Cassidix mexicanus), and zanatillo (Cassidis nicaraguensis). The latter species is endemic to the coasts of lakes in Nicaragua.

Among the threats affecting the conservation of the protected area are frequent forest fires and the expansion of agricultural areas at the expense of the nature reserve.
