= Rota (volcano) =

Volcano in Nicaragua

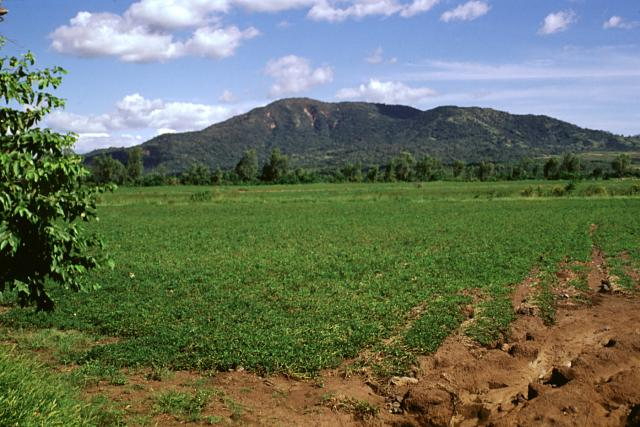

Highest point
- Elevation: 832 m (2,730 ft)
- Coordinates: 12°33′N 86°45′W

Geography
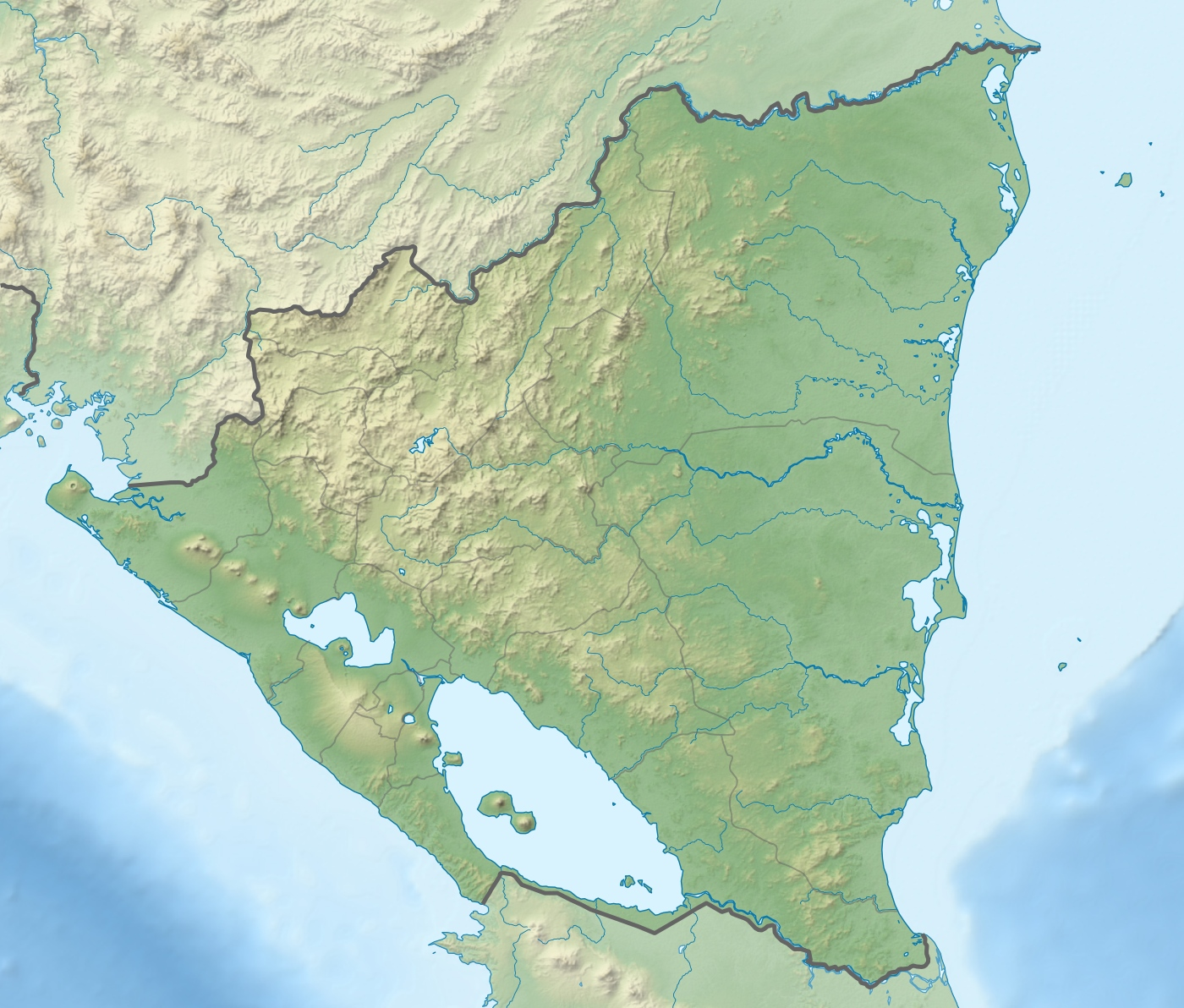
- Location within Nicaragua
- Location: León Department, Nicaragua

Geology
- Mountain type: Stratovolcano
- Volcanic arc: Central America Volcanic Arc
- Last eruption: Unknown

Rota is a stratovolcano located in the western part of Nicaragua.

== See also ==
- List of volcanoes in Nicaragua
