= Las Lajas (volcano) =

Volcano in Nicaragua

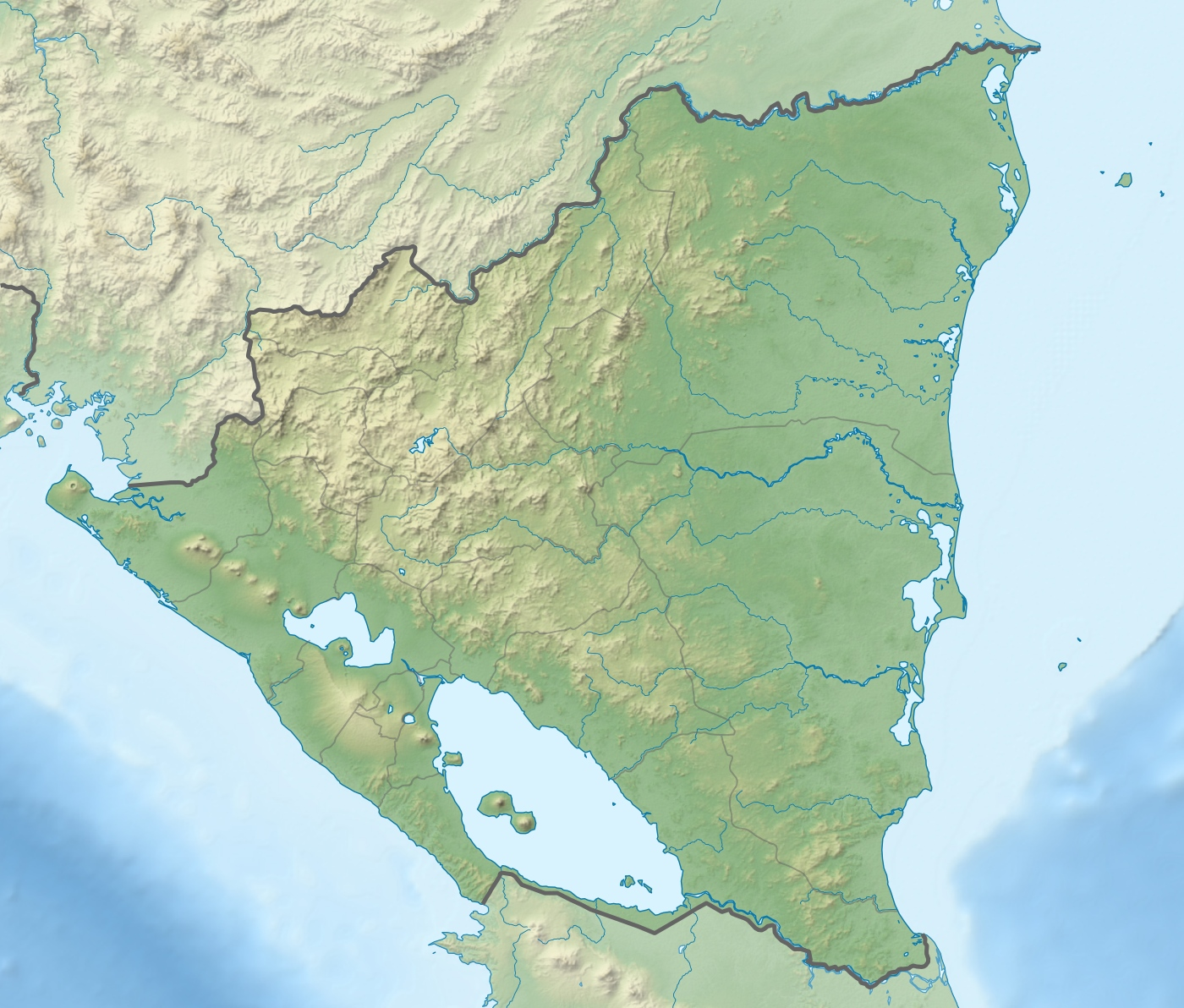
- Location within Nicaragua

Highest point
- Elevation: 926 m (3,038 ft)
- Listing: List of volcanoes in Nicaragua
- Coordinates: 12°18′N 85°44′W

Geography
- Location: Boaco Department, Nicaragua

Geology
- Mountain type: Shield volcano
- Volcanic arc: Central America Volcanic Arc
- Last eruption: Unknown

Las Lajas is a shield volcano located in the central part of Nicaragua, 22 kilometres (14 mi) north of Lake Nicaragua. Comarca las Lajas is among a number of communities lying within the volcano's caldera.

== See also ==
List of volcanoes in Nicaragua
