= Las Pilas =

Volcano in Nicaragua

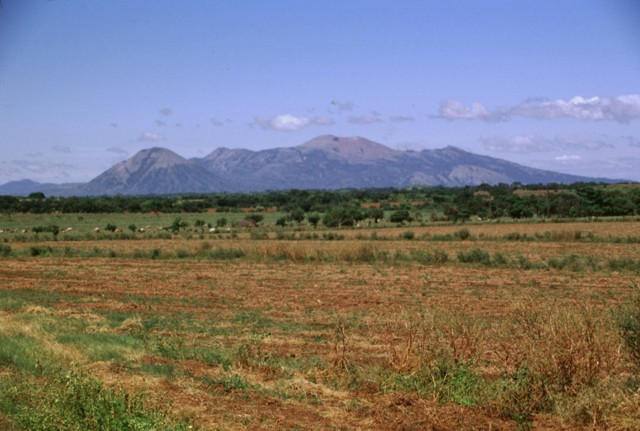
- Las Pilas

Highest point
- Elevation: 1,088 m (3,570 ft)
- Coordinates: 12°29′20″N 86°39′54″W

Geography
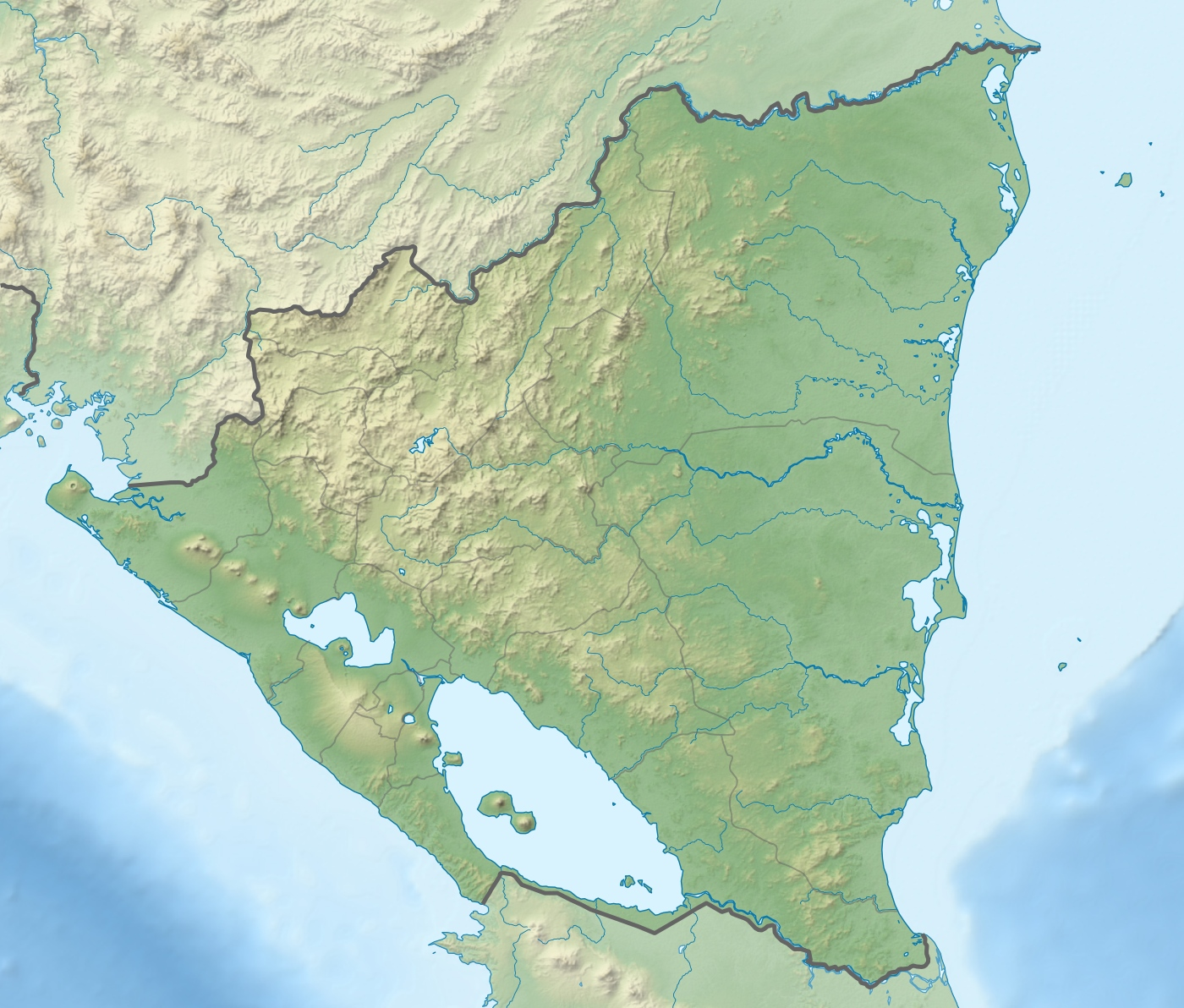
- Location within Nicaragua
- Location: León Department, Nicaragua

Geology
- Mountain type: Complex volcano
- Volcanic arc: Central America Volcanic Arc
- Last eruption: October 1954

Las Pilas (or El Hoyo) is a complex volcano located in the western part of Nicaragua. Part of a 30-km-long volcanic massif, Las Pilas has a series of well-preserved flank vents surrounding a central cone. Las Pilas last erupted in the 1950s and before that possibly in the 16th century.

An aerial image of the volcano appeared in the August 1944 issue of National Geographic Magazine (p. 180). On the slope near the peak, a curious circular 100-m diameter sinkhole visible in the 1944 photo is still present in 2020.

== See also ==
- List of volcanoes in Nicaragua
