= Multi-component gas analyzer system =

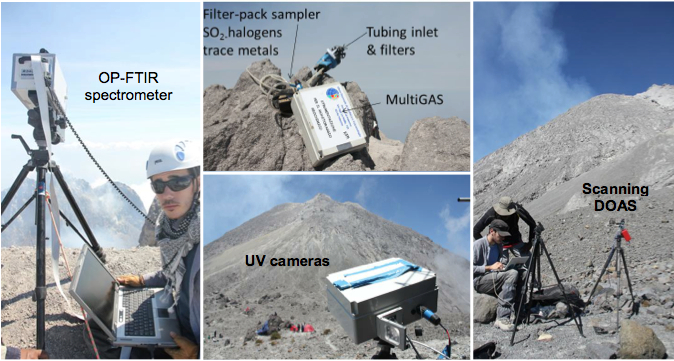
A multi-component gas analyzer system is often one of many instruments used to measure gases and monitor volcanic activity.

A multi-component gas analyzer system (Multi-GAS) is an instrument package used to take real-time high-resolution measurements of volcanic gases. A Multi-GAS package includes an infrared spectrometer for CO_{2}, two electrochemical sensors for SO_{2} and H_{2}S, and pressure–temperature–humidity sensors, all in a weatherproof box. The system can be used for individual surveys or set up as permanent stations connected to radio transmitters for transmission of data from remote locations. The instrument package is portable, and its operation and data analysis are simple enough to be conducted by non-specialists.

Multi-GAS instruments have been used to measure volcanic gases at Mount Etna, Stromboli, Vulcano Italy, Villarrica (volcano) Chile, Masaya Volcano Nicaragua, Mount Yasur, Miyake-jima and Mount Asama Japan, Soufrière Hills Montserrat, with permanent installations at Etna and Stromboli.

The development of this instrument has helped scientists to monitor real-time changes in volcanic gas composition, allowing for more rapid hazard mitigation and an enhanced understanding of volcano processes.

== System mechanics ==
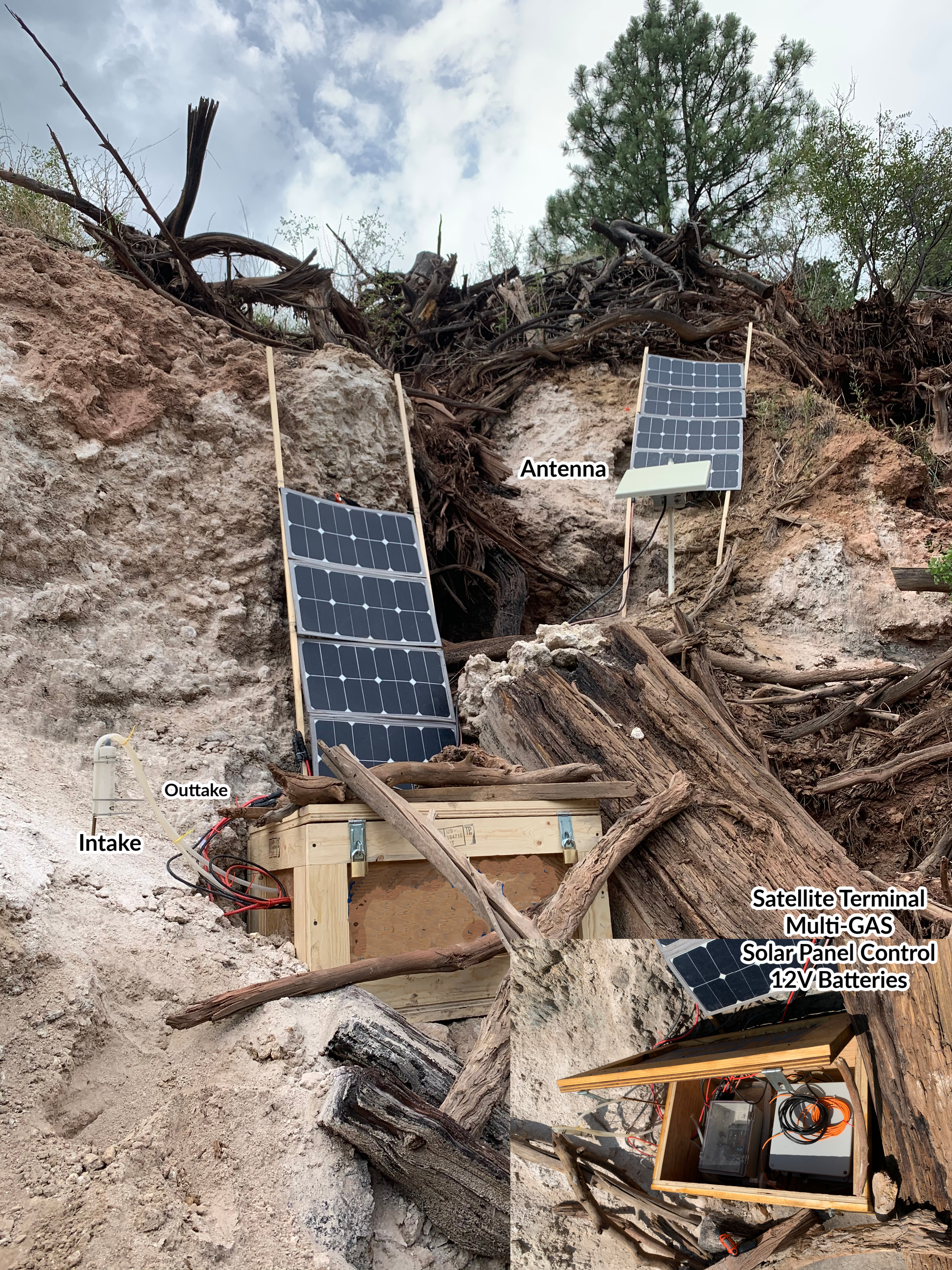
Multi-GAS permanent field station. Set-up consists of a Multi-GAS, satellite terminal, 12V batteries, and solar panel control located inside the wooden box. Satellite antenna, solar panels, and multi-GAS intake/outtake located outside of the box.

Multi-component gas analyzer systems are used for measuring the major components of volcanic gases. CO_{2}, SO_{2}, H_{2}S, and pressure-temperature-humidity sensors are typically included in a package. Other electrochemical sensors have been successfully incorporated as well, including for H_{2} and HCl. The instruments are packaged in compact, portable, weather-resistant containers allowing for in situ measurements of various types of outgassing terrains. Gas is pumped into the system at a constant flow rate through a silicone tube placed near the location of interest. A data-logger is used to automatically record and convert the voltage values from the sensors into gas composition values. While the field use of a multi-GAS is simple, postprocessing of the data can be complex. This is due to factors like instrument drift, and atmospheric or environmental conditions. The system can be used for short term or long term studies. Short term usage can include powering the multi-GAS by a lithium battery and moving it around to desired locations or setting up a multi-GAS in a fixed location for a short period of time. Long term studies involve setting up a permanent installment for an extended time. These stations can be set-up with terrestrial (e.g. 3G) or satellite radio transmitters to send data from distant locations.

== Volcano monitoring ==
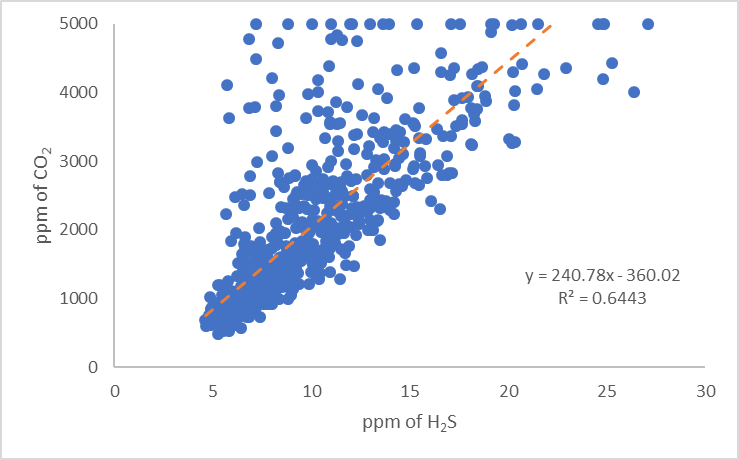
Raw multi-GAS data showing the correlation between CO_{2} and H_{2}S. Fitting a linear regression line to raw data allows for the calculation of the CO_{2}/H_{2}S ratio for monitoring changes in the gas output of the system.

Monitoring changes in gas composition allows for an understanding of changes occurring in the associated volcanic system. Multi-GAS measurements of real-time CO_{2}/SO_{2} ratios can allow detection of the pre-eruptive degassing of rising magmas, improving the prediction of volcanic activity. As magma rises beneath the surface CO_{2} solubility decreases and the gas readily exsolves, leading to an increase in the CO_{2}/SO_{2} ratio. A new input of CO_{2}-rich magma into a previously degassed system would also cause the CO_{2}/SO_{2} ratio to rise, indicating changes in volcanic activity. During a two year study at Mount Etna quiescent periods had CO_{2}/SO_{2} ratios <1, but during the lead up to an eruption values as high as 25 were seen. Magmatic or hydrothermal input can be monitored by the temporal variations in H_{2}S/SO_{2} ratios, advancing the understanding of future eruptive behavior. CO_{2}/H_{2}S ratios are used to define the characteristic gas composition of the sampled area. The ratio can be a tool for understanding how the magmatic gas may have been scrubbed. Other molar ratios and gas species measured by a multi-GAS can provide information for further analysis of volcanic conditions.

== Case studies ==
Multi-GAS stations have been employed at many volcanoes all around the world and due to its simple design it can be employed by many groups, like scientists, for academic purposes, or government agencies like the USGS, that can use data for public safety reasons. In Europe and Asia volcanoes like Stromboli and Vulcano, Mount Yasur, Miyake-jima and Mount Asama are well monitored with stations. In the Americas, Villarrica, Masaya Volcano, Mount St. Helens, and Soufrière Hills are also observed with instruments for changes in volcanic gas output.

=== Mount Etna, Italy ===
A permanent multi-GAS installment was placed by Mount Etna's summit crater to collect real-time measurements of H_{2}O, CO_{2}, and SO_{2} over a 2-year period. Data was used to correlate increasing CO_{2}/SO_{2} ratios with rising magma beneath the edifice and associated volcanic eruptions.

=== Krýsuvík, Iceland ===
A multi-GAS was emplaced in the Krýsuvík geothermal system to collect real-time time-series data of H_{2}O, CO_{2}, SO_{2}, and H_{2}S. Molar ratios were compared with local seismic data; increased gas ratio values followed episodes of increased seismicity. Degassing activity increases after ground movement due to the opening of new paths (e.g. fractures) in the crust for the gas to flow.

=== Yellowstone, United States ===
To help understand caldera dynamics a multi-GAS was used to measure temporal variations in volcanic gases at Yellowstone. Temporal variations coincided with atmospheric and environmental fluctuations. Molar ratios fell within a binary mixing trend.

=== Nyiragongo, Democratic Republic of the Congo ===
CO_{2}/SO_{2} molar ratios from multi-GAS measurements confirmed a previous observation that an increase in lava lake levels correlates with an increase in the CO_{2}/SO_{2 ratio.}

=== Deep Earth Carbon Degassing Project (DECADE) ===
The DECADE project supported initiatives to set up and expand the use of permanent instrumentation for continuous CO_{2}, and SO_{2} measurements from volcanoes. Multi-GAS systems have been set up at volcanoes such as Villarrica, Chile and Turrialba, Costa Rica.

== See also ==
- Prediction of volcanic activity
- Fourier-transform infrared spectroscopy
- Differential optical absorption spectroscopy
- Ultraviolet–visible spectroscopy
