= Apoyeque =

Pyroclastic shield in Nicaragua

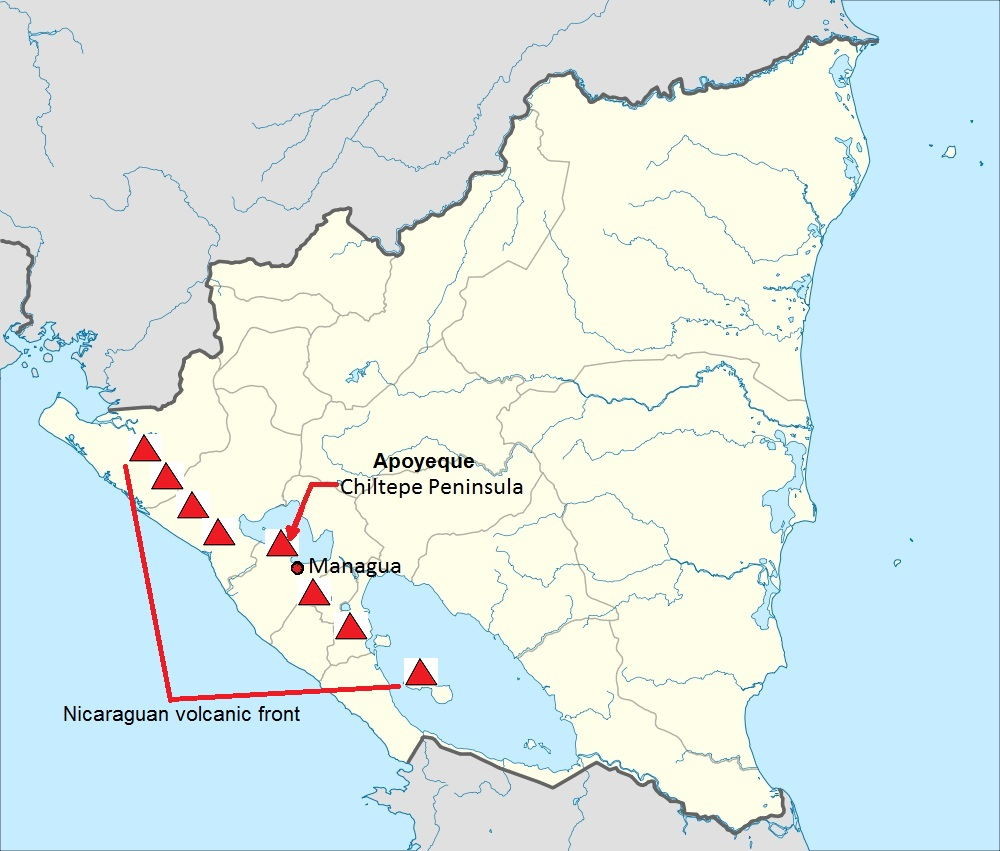
- Map of Nicaragua, showing location of Chiltepe peninsula and Nicaragua volcanic front.

Highest point
- Elevation: 518 m (1,699 ft)
- Coordinates: 12°14′30″N 86°20′30″W

Geography
- Location: Nicaragua

Geology
- Mountain type: Pyroclastic shield
- Volcanic arc: Central America Volcanic Arc
- Last eruption: 50 BC ± 100 years

Apoyeque is a pyroclastic shield, located in the Chiltepe Peninsula Natural Reserve in Nicaragua. It has a 2.8-km wide, 400-m-deep, lake-filled caldera.

== Geography ==
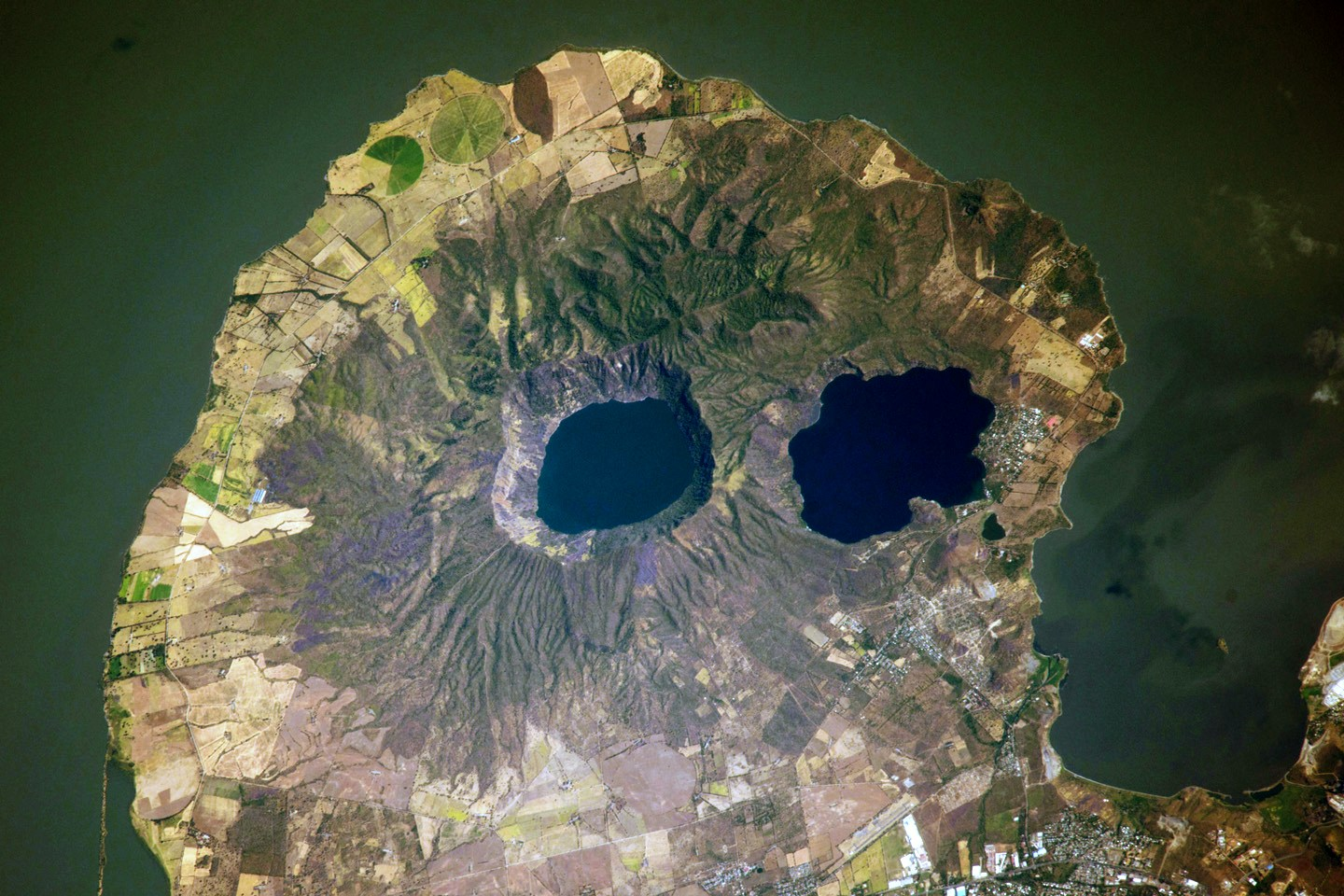
The Chiltepe Peninsula and the Apoyeque caldera, view from the ISS.

Apoyeque is a volcanic complex that formed and occupies the Chiltepe Peninsula. It is part of the Chiltepe pyroclastic shield volcano, one of three ignimbrite shields on the Nicaraguan volcanic front.

The lake at its center, Apoyeque lake (Spanish: Laguna de Apoyeque, also called Laguna de Apoyaque,), its shore 100 meters below the peak of the caldera, at its bottom reaches down to sea level.

Apoyeque, as well as the entire Chiltepe peninsula are part of the Managua administrative region, in close proximity to city of Managua, Nicaragua's capital.

Immediately southeast of Apoyeque peak is the 2.5 × 3 kilometer-wide lake-filled Xiloá (Jiloá) maar, a part of the Apoyeque complex.

== Volcanology ==
The last eruption of Apoyeque, in about 50 BC (+/- 100 years), was one of the largest explosions known in history, and it had a Volcanic Explosivity Index (VEI) of 6.

In addition to the Chiltepe dome (volcán Chiltepe), which is used synonymously with Apoyeque, the Apoyeque complex contains the Jiloa caldera (Laguna de Jiloa aka Xiloá), the Miraflores dome and the Cerro Talpetate dome.

An eruption of Laguna Xiloá 6100 years ago produced pumiceous pyroclastic flows that overlay similar deposits of similar age from Masaya.

Apoyeque has been identified as a particular dangerous volcano, due to its history of major eruptions separated by 2000 years, proximity to Managua, and the risks of generating lake tsunamis.

== See also ==
- List of volcanoes in Nicaragua
