= Cosigüina =

Stratovolcano in Nicaragua

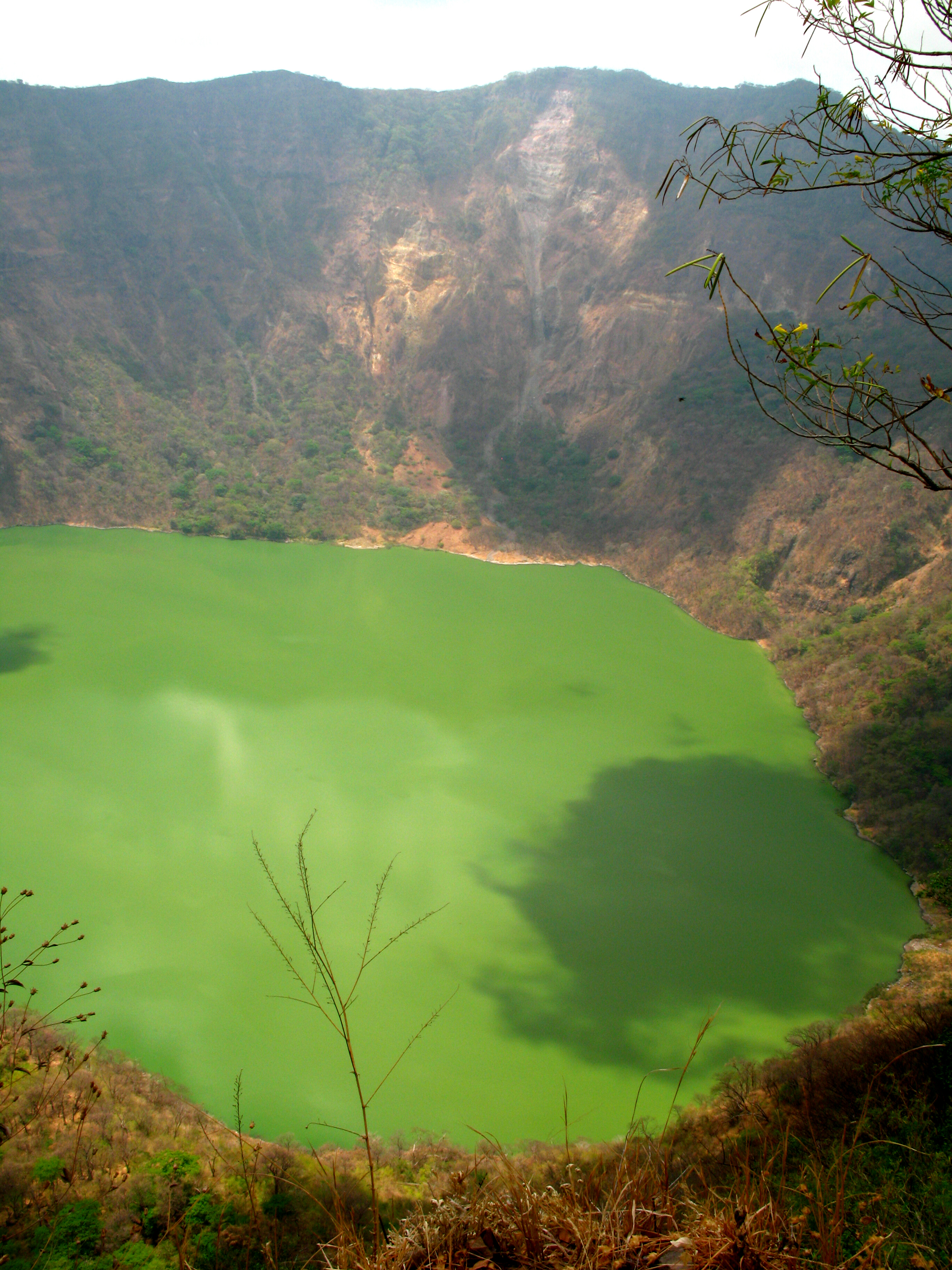
- Cosigüina crater lake, 2009

Highest point
- Elevation: 872 m (2,861 ft)
- Coordinates: 12°59′N 87°34′W

Geography
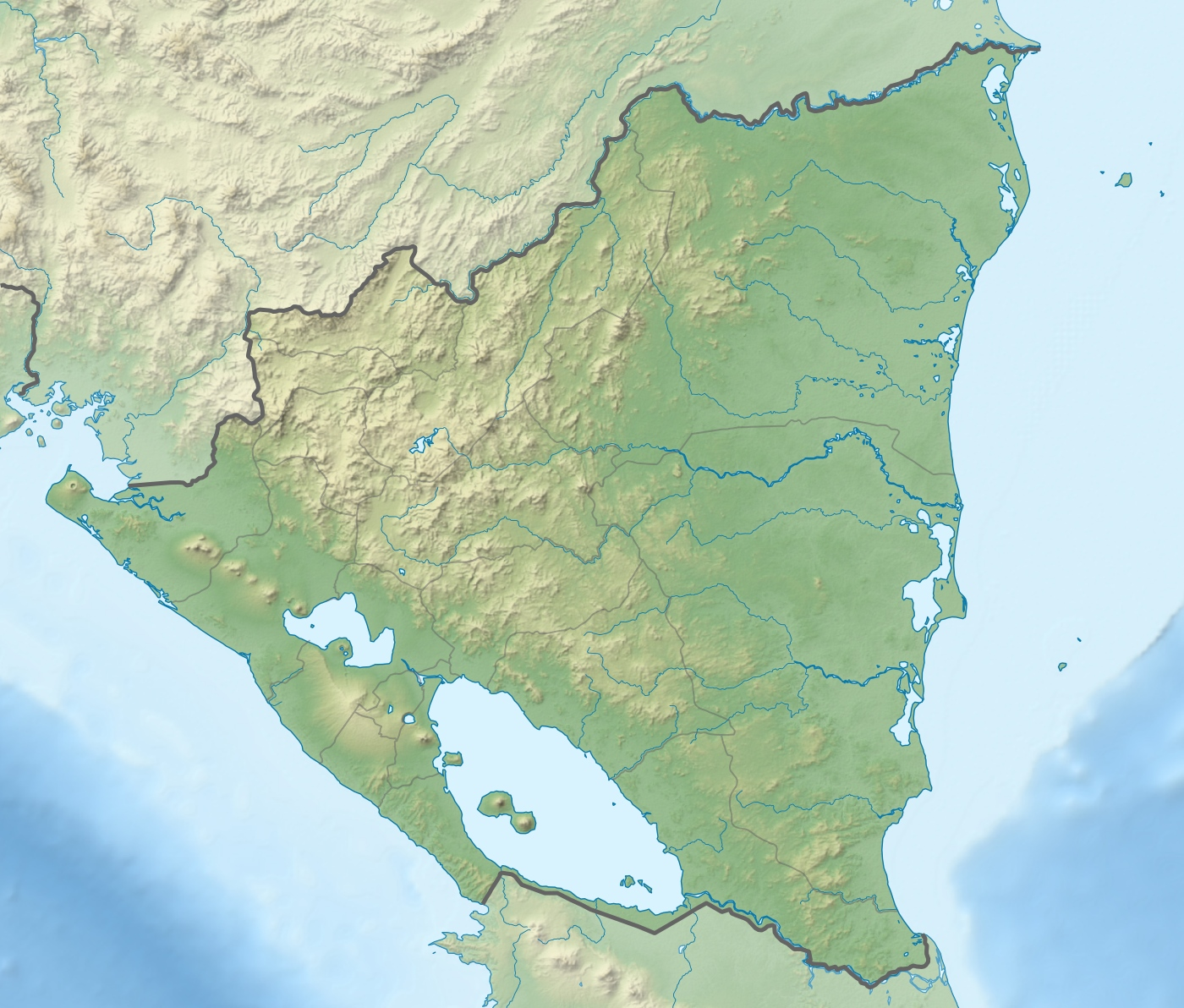
- Location within Nicaragua
- Location: Chinandega Department, Nicaragua

Geology
- Mountain type: Stratovolcano
- Volcanic arc: Central America Volcanic Arc
- Last eruption: August 1859

Cosigüina (also spelt Cosegüina) is a stratovolcano located in the western part of Nicaragua. It forms a large peninsula extending into the Gulf of Fonseca. The summit is truncated by a large caldera, 2 x 2.4 km in diameter and 500 m deep, holding a substantial crater lake (Laguna Cosigüina). This cone has grown within an earlier caldera, forming a somma volcano. The earlier caldera rim is still exposed on the north side, but has been buried by the younger cone elsewhere.

== Activity ==
The volcano last erupted in 1859, but its most famous activity occurred on January 20, 1835, during the presidency of José Núñez, when it produced the largest historical eruption in Nicaragua. Ash from the 1835 eruption has been found in Mexico, Costa Rica, and Jamaica. According to an analysis by Berkeley Earth Surface Temperature, the 1835 eruption caused a temporary decrease in the average land temperature of Earth of about 0.75 degrees C.

It has not erupted since 1859, only an instant in terms of geological time. An earthquake swarm was measured near Cosigüina in 2002, indicating that tectonic forces are still active in the region although the volcano is somewhat isolated from the line of more recently active Central American volcanoes to the northwest and southeast. The only indicators of hydrothermal activity at the volcano are intermittently observed gas bubbles in Laguna Cosigüina and a hot spring along the eastern flank of the volcano. The fairly uniform vegetation cover on the volcano's sides also attests to a general lack of gas emissions or “hot spots” on the 872-meter-high cone.

== See also ==
- List of volcanoes in Nicaragua

== Notes ==
- Williams, Howel (1952) The great eruption of Coseguina, Nicaragua, 1835, with notes on the Nicaraguan volcanic chain (University of California Publications in geological sciences v. 29, no. 2) University of California Press, Berkeley, OCLC 248539314
- McBirney, Alexander R. and Williams, Howel (1965) Volcanic History of Nicaragua (University of California publications in geological sciences v. 55) University of California Press, Berkeley, OCLC 5506488
- Sanz, Dionisio Martínez (1963) Montañas que arden Editorial Hospicio, Managua, Nicaragua, OCLC 3306591, in Spanish
