= Las Lajas, Catamarca =

Coordinates: 27°50′47″S 65°43′34″W

Las Lajas (Catamarca)
- Municipality and village
- Interactive map of Las Lajas (Catamarca)
- Country: Argentina
- Province: Catamarca Province
- Time zone: UTC−3 (ART)

Las Lajas (Catamarca) is a village and municipality in Catamarca Province in northwestern Argentina.
