= Lajes =

Lajes is Portuguese for "covering of flat rock", or "flagstone", and may refer to:

== Places ==
=== Brazil ===
- Lajes, Rio Grande do Norte, Rio Grande do Norte
- Lages, Santa Catarina, Brazil
- Lajes Pintadas, Rio Grande do Norte

=== Portugal ===
- Lajes (Seia), a civil parish in the municipality of Seia

==== Archipelago of the Azores ====
- Lajes das Flores, a municipality on the island of Flores

- Lajes das Flores (parish), a civil parish and the municipal seat of the municipality of Lajes das Flores

- Lajes do Pico (Azores), a municipality along the southern coast of the island of Pico

- Lajes do Pico (Azores), a civil parish and the municipal seat of the municipality of Lajes do Pico

- Lajes (Praia da Vitória), a civil parish in the municipality of Praia da Vitória, Terceira

== Other uses ==
- Lajes Field, a multi-use air field and regional air passenger terminal located near Lajes on Terceira Island in the Azores, Portugal
- Ribeirão das Lajes, a river in Rio de Janeiro state in southeastern Brazil

== See also ==
- Lages, a municipality in Santa Catarina, Brazil
