= Mombacho =

Volcano in Nicaragua

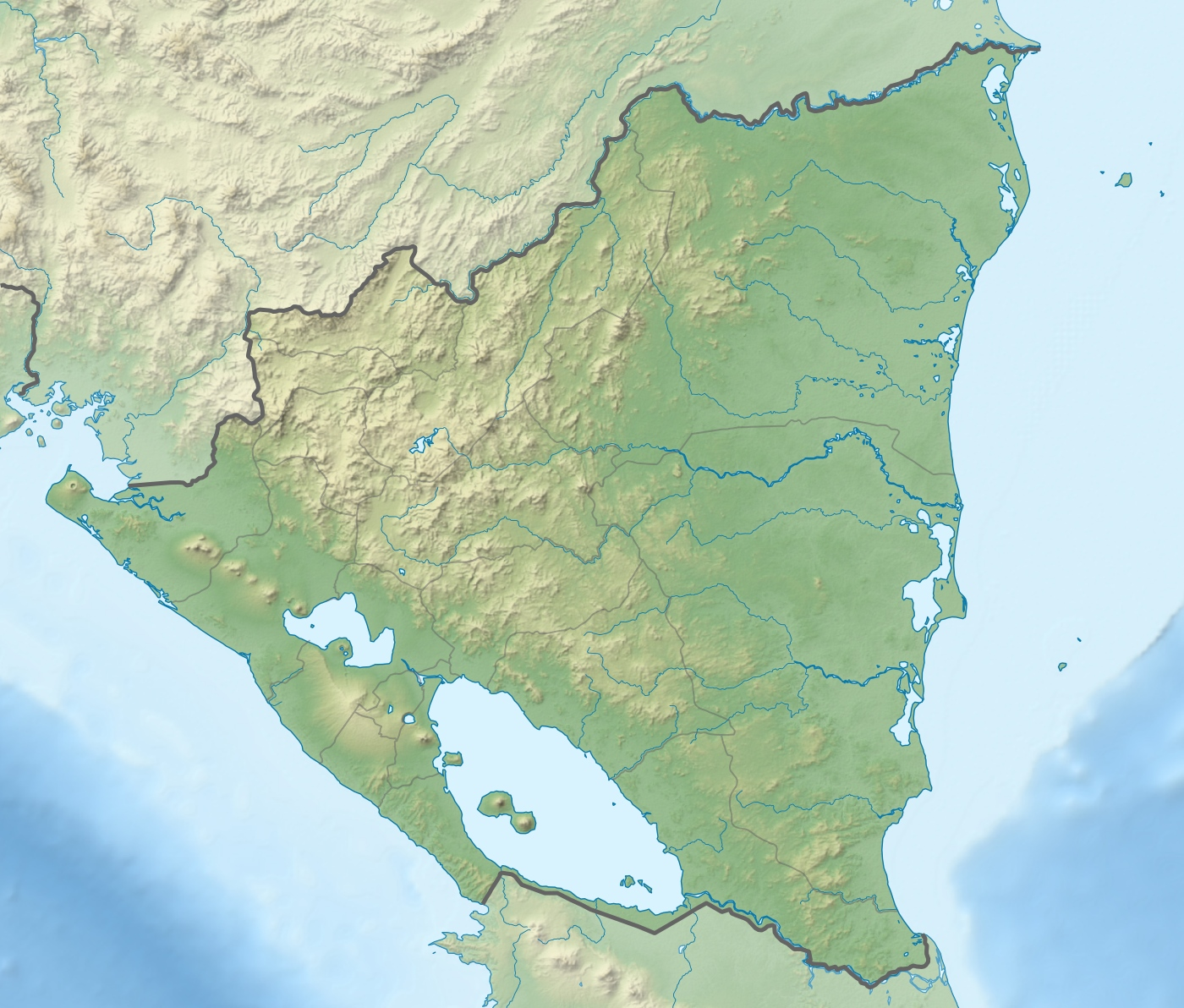
- Location within Nicaragua

Highest point
- Elevation: 1,344 m (4,409 ft)
- Listing: List of volcanoes in Nicaragua
- Coordinates: 11°49′34″N 85°58′03″W

Geography
- Location: Nicaragua

Geology
- Rock age: Holocene
- Mountain type: Stratovolcano
- Volcanic arc: Central America Volcanic Arc
- Last eruption: 1570

Mombacho is a stratovolcano in Nicaragua, near the city of Granada. It is 1,344 metres (4,409 ft) high. The Mombacho Volcano Nature Reserve is one of 78 protected areas of Nicaragua. Mombacho’s last eruption occurred in 1570. There is no historical knowledge of earlier eruptions.

The highest regions of the volcano are home to a cloud forest and dwarf forest, which contain flora and fauna endemic purely to the volcano. An increasingly popular tourist attraction, the volcano has views of Lake Nicaragua and the city of Granada. The volcano also has two hiking trails, a moderate one that circles the main crater, and another, more difficult trail (El Puma), which must be led by a guide. The more difficult trail is the only way to see some features such as the dwarf forest. The trail is almost completely 45° inclines and declines for about two miles.

More than 700 different plants are registered around Mombacho, including many species of orchids.

== Images of Mombacho ==
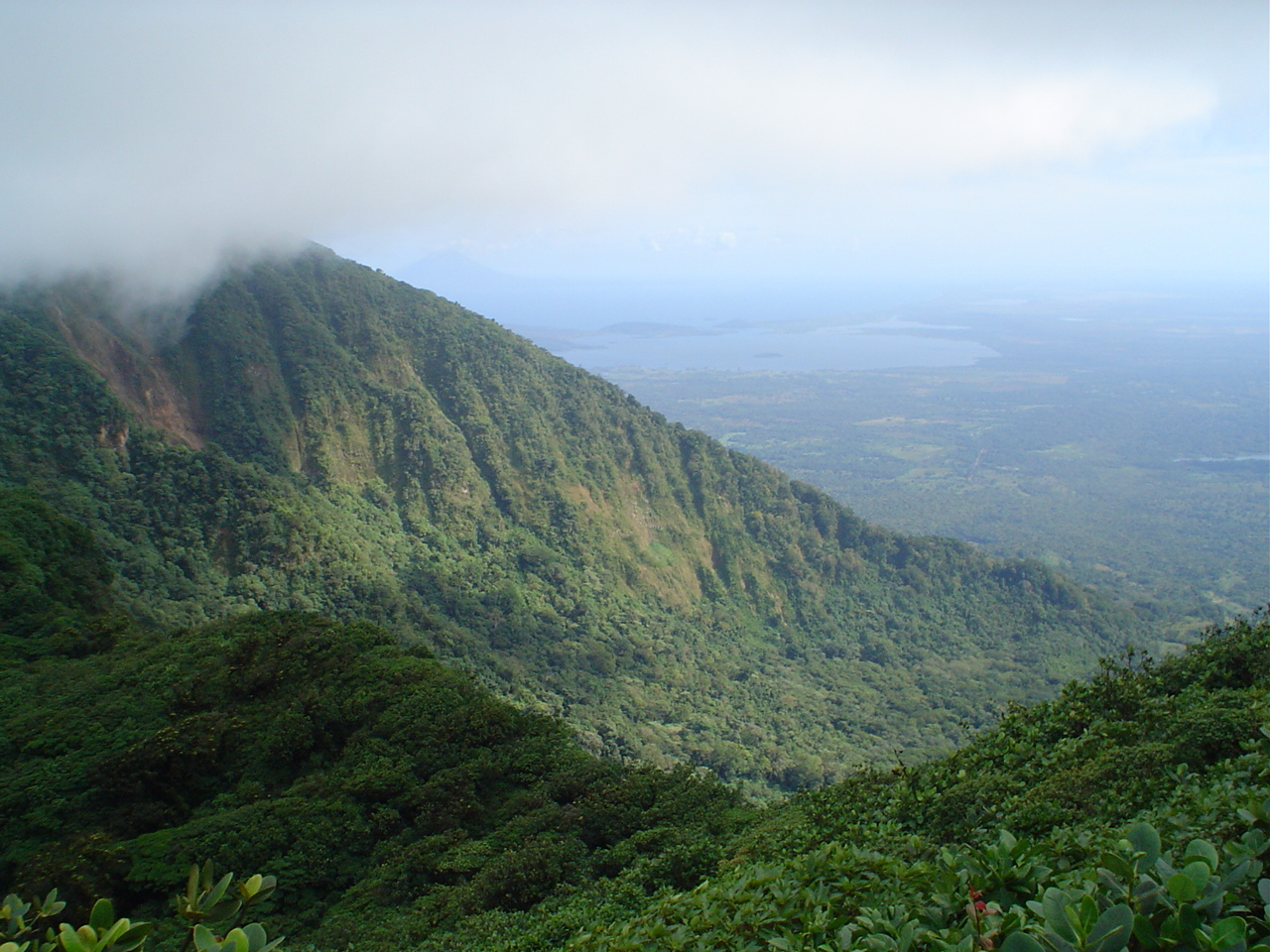
Slope

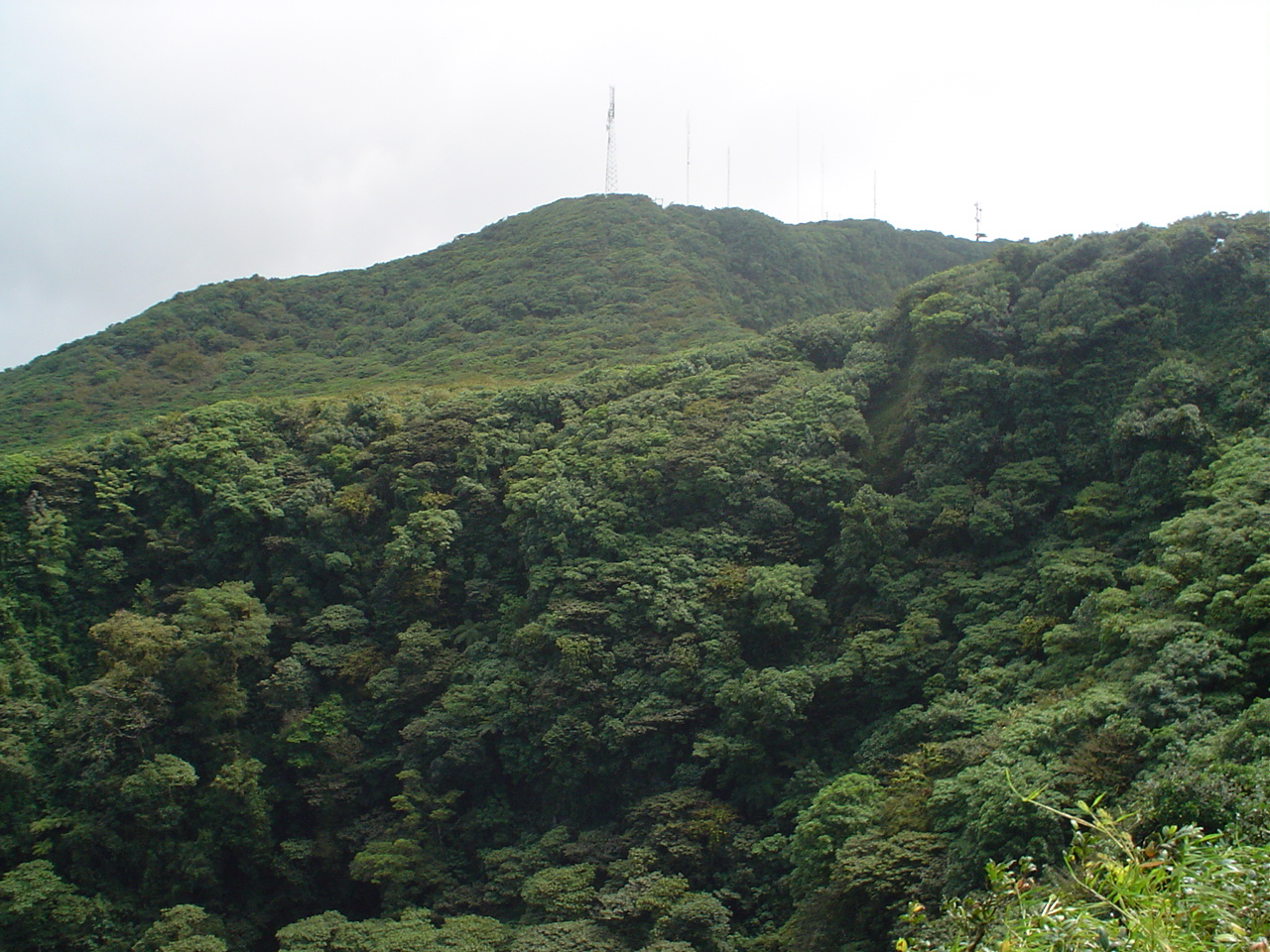
Crater

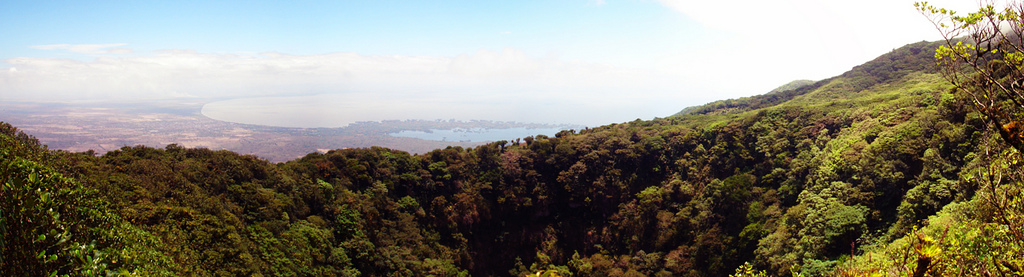
Panorama taken on Mombacho

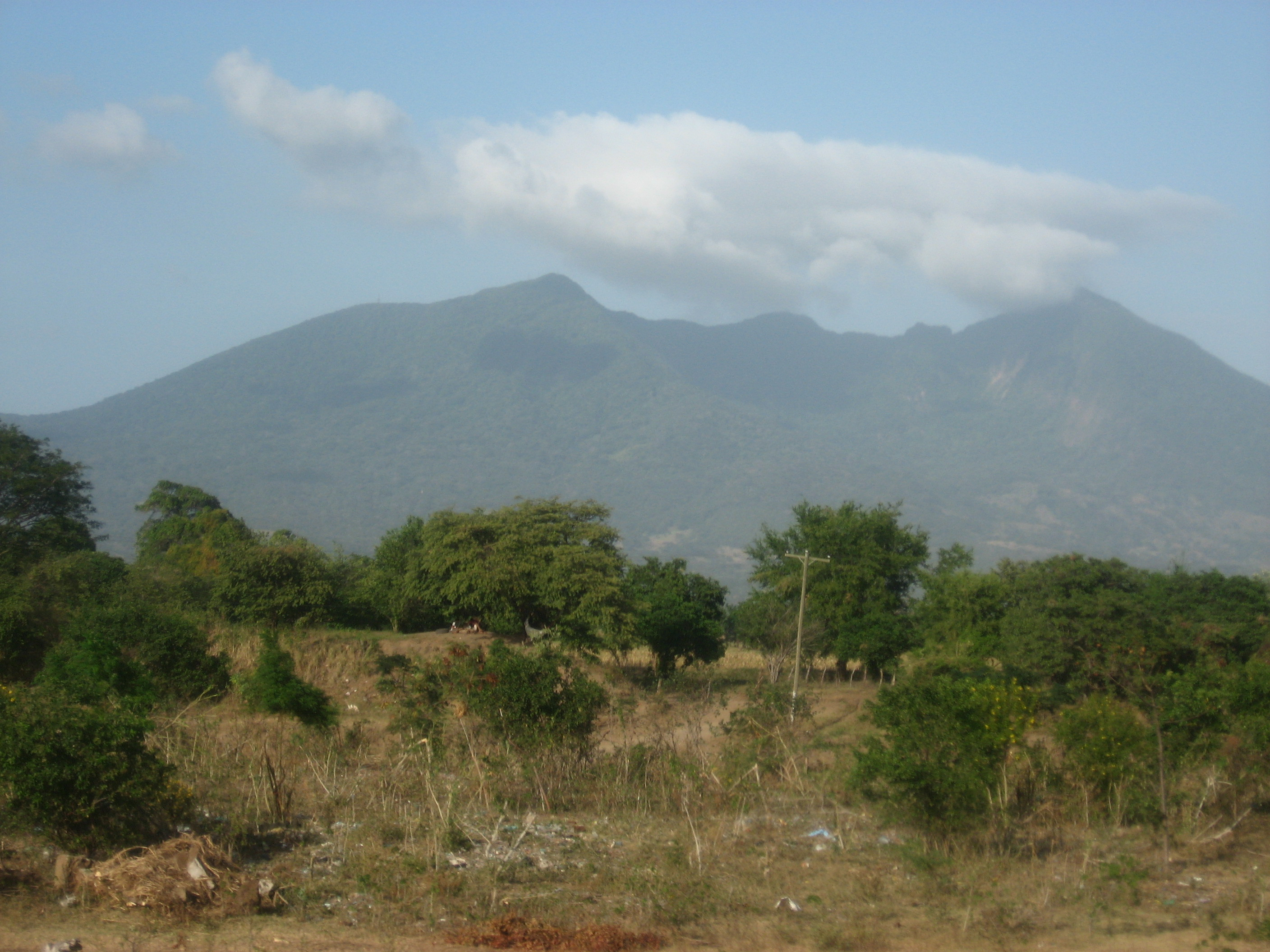
Mombacho from a distance

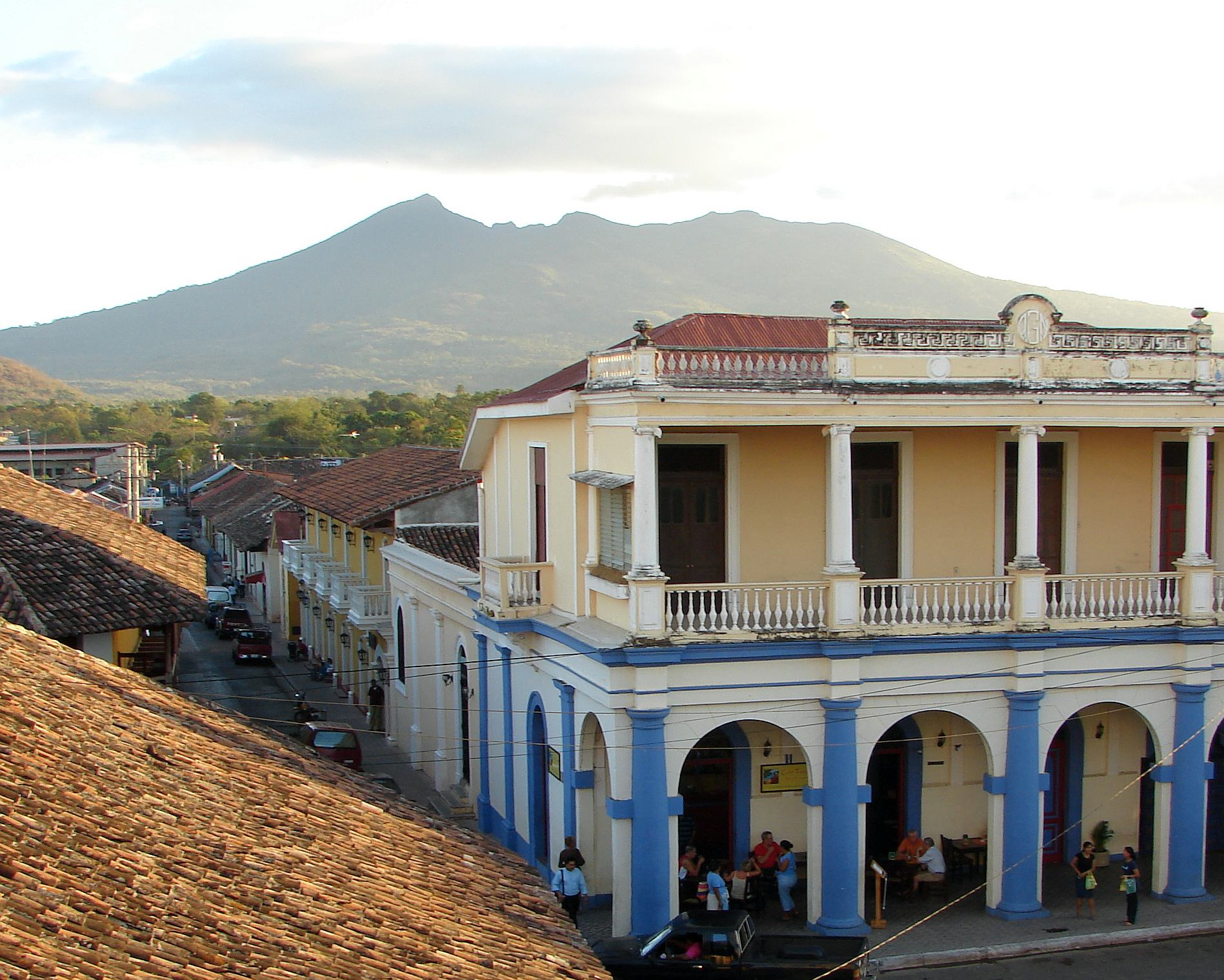
Mombacho from Granada.

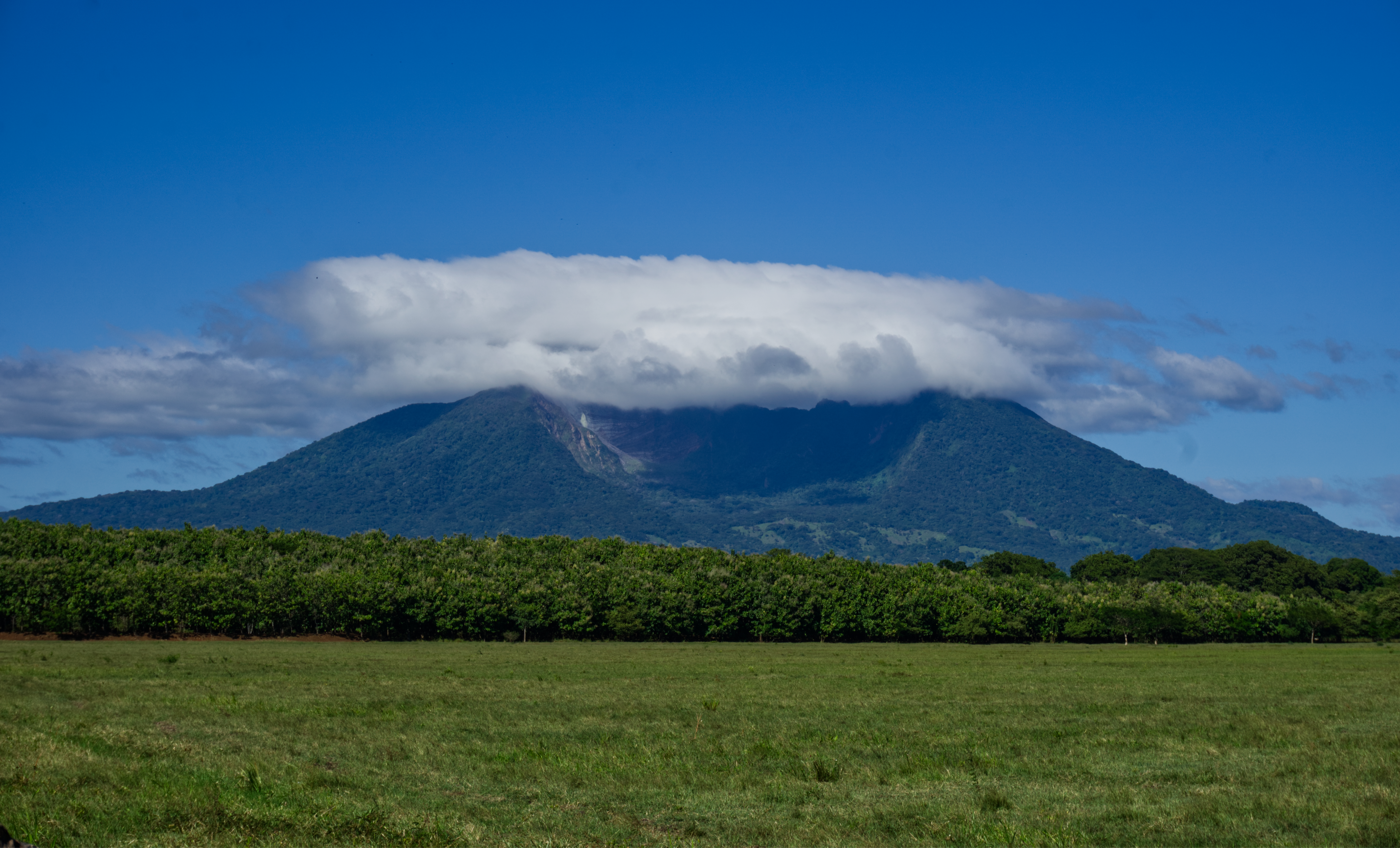
Mombacho with cloud cover photographed from the Pan-American Highway near El Calmito (Nicaragua).

== See also ==
- List of volcanoes in Nicaragua
