= Telica (volcano) =

Volcano in Nicaragua

- Volcán Telica
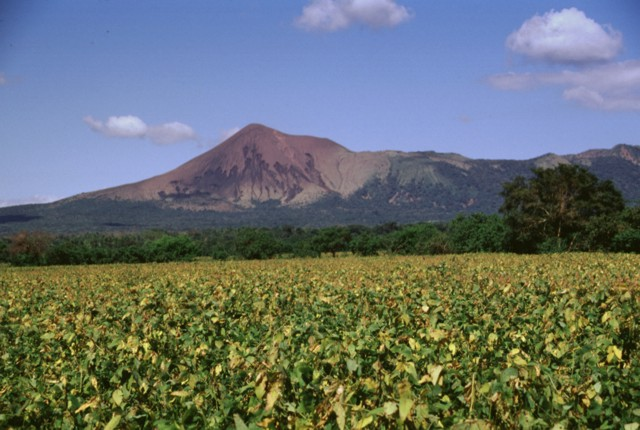
- Telica

Highest point
- Elevation: 1,036 m (3,399 ft)
- Coordinates: 12°36′07″N 86°50′42″W

Geography
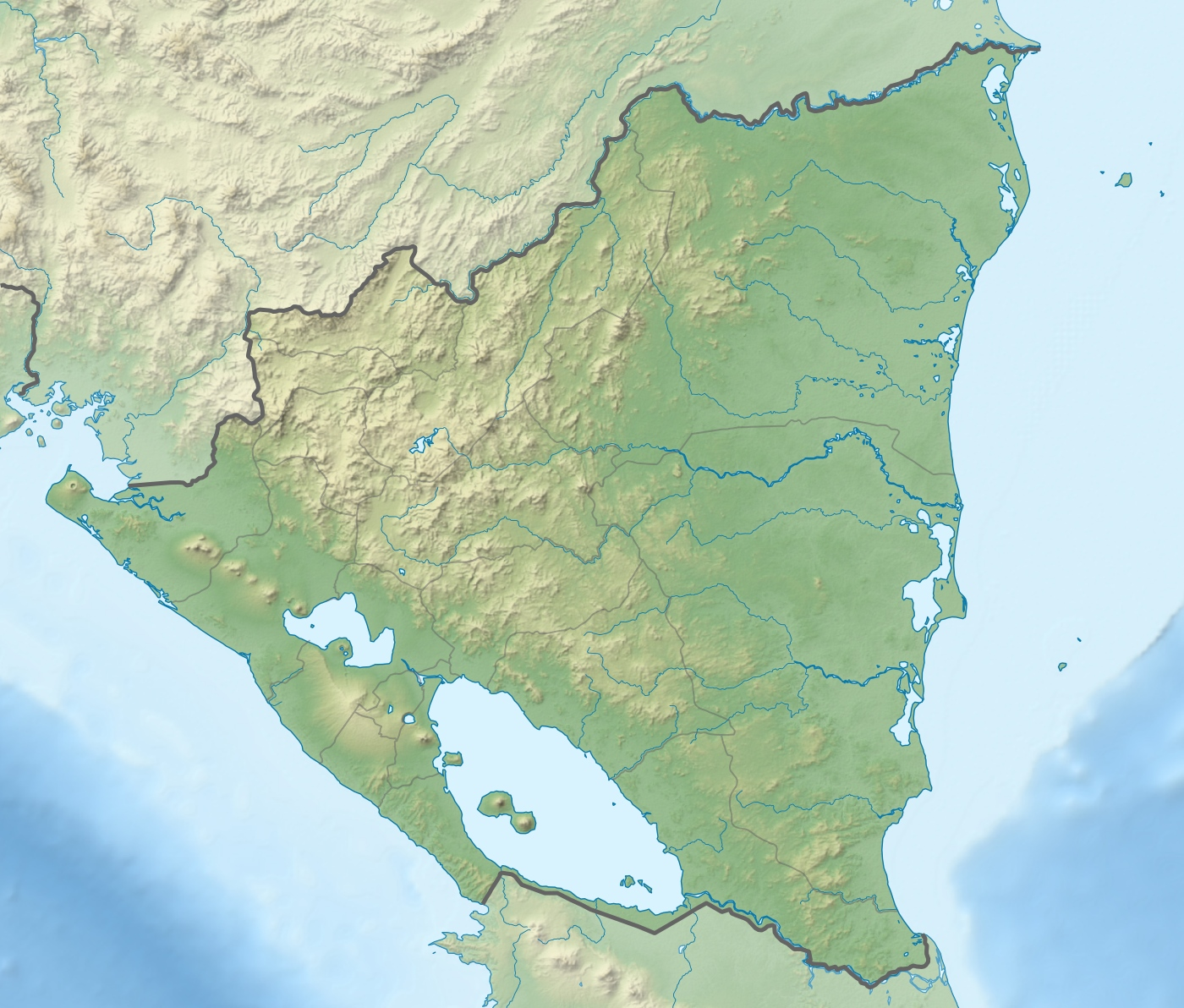
- Location within Nicaragua
- Location: León Department, Nicaragua

Geology
- Mountain type: Stratovolcano
- Volcanic arc: Central America Volcanic Arc
- Last eruption: 2025

Telica (Spanish: Volcán Telica) is a stratovolcano, one of several volcanoes of the Nicaraguan volcanic front. It is located in Telica municipality, in the León department of Nicaragua, within the Volcán Telica Rota Natural Reserve.

One of Nicaragua's most active volcanoes, Telica has erupted frequently, and ash from those frequent eruptions keeps the slopes of its cone bare of vegetation.

== Volcanism ==
Telica has six cones, the tallest of which is 1036 meters high. There is a double crater at the top, 700 meters wide and 120 meters deep. Telica has erupted frequently since the Spanish Era. The last eruption was on July 29, 2020. Telica's largest recorded eruption, in 1529, had a Volcanic Explosivity Index of 4.

Telica became active in August 1999. An eruption produced ash-fall, and on 18 August a lava lake was observed in the summit crater. The ash eruptions continued until February 2000 and declined afterwards. From 9 January to February 2007, small ash eruptions produced ash clouds reaching altitudes of 4900 ft (1.5 km).

In the afternoon of 7 May 2015, Telica increased its volcanic activity, with explosions and low-intensity earthquakes. These explosions produced gas emissions and volcanic ash. On the night of 10 May, an explosive eruption occurred, dusting nearby towns with ash. The volcano registered numerous small eruptions over the succeeding months, including one which caused ash fall in León on September 23. No major damage or injuries were reported.

== Tourism ==
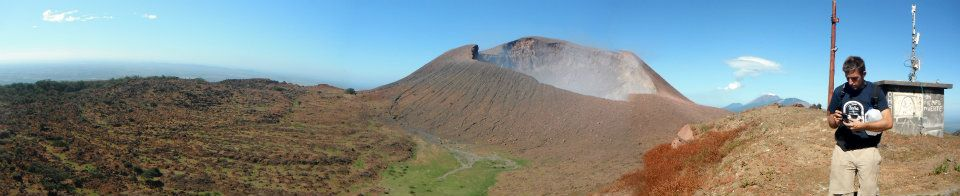
The general proximity to the city of León makes Telica a popular tourist attraction. Most hikes enter through the small town of San Jacinto, known for its bubbling mud pits and small geothermal electric generation plant.

== See also ==
- List of volcanoes in Nicaragua
