= Central America Volcanic Arc =

Chain of volcanoes parallel to the Pacific coastline from Mexico to Panama

Coordinates: 10°26′31″N 84°41′17″W

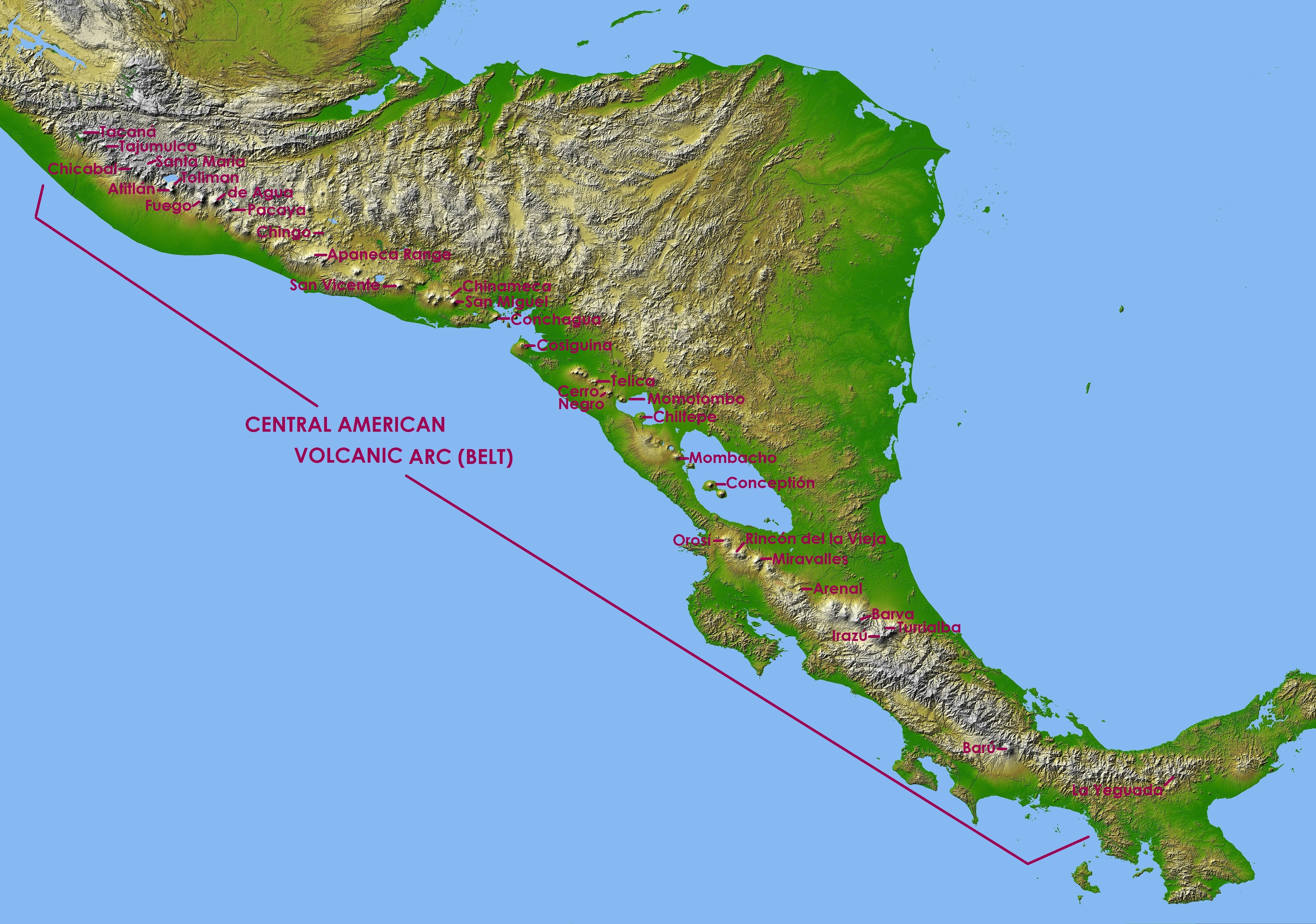
Map of the Central American volcanic arc, with captions showing the location of several volcanoes – in the Mexico/Guatemala border: Tacaná; in Guatemala: Tajumulco, Santa Maria, Chicabal, Tolimán, Atitlán, Volcán de Fuego, Volcán de Agua, Pacaya, Chingo; in El Salvador: Apaneca Range, Chinchontepec or San Vicente, Chaparrastique or San Miguel, Chinameca and Conchagua; in Nicaragua: Cosiguina, Telica, Cerro Negro, Momotombo, Apoyeque-Chiltepe, Mombacho and Concepción; in Costa Rica: Orosí, Rincón de la Vieja, Miravalles, Arenal, Barva, Turrialba and Irazú; in Panama: Barú and La Yeguada.

The Central American Volcanic Arc (often abbreviated to CAVA) is a chain of volcanoes which extends parallel to the Pacific coastline of the Central American Isthmus, from Mexico to Panama. This volcanic arc, which has a length of 1,100 kilometers (680 mi) is formed by an active subduction zone, with the Cocos plate subducting underneath the Caribbean plate, the North American plate and the Panama plate. Volcanic activity is recorded in the Central American region since the Permian. Numerous volcanoes are spread throughout various Central American countries; many have been active in the geologic past, varying in intensity of their activity according to different factors.

== Tectonic setting ==
The CAVA is formed by the subduction of the Cocos and Nazca plates underneath the North American, Caribbean and Panama plates. Its structure is heterogeneous, by a combination of oceanic and continental crust fragments. Gazel et al. (2021) define four domains of the CAVA: North American plate slivers (continental crust), the Guatemala Suture Zone (GSZ) (continental crust), continental blocks of the Caribbean plate, and Pacific-affinity accreted complexes (oceanic crust).

The Cocos tectonic plate is located along the western edge of Central America. The latter is along the western edge of the Caribbean tectonic plate and can be split into two distinct regimes. These regimes are demarcated roughly by the Costa Rican-Nicaraguan border and can be differentiated by the different tectonic histories of each respective area. The southern portion is part of a magmatic arc, while the northern one is associated with several active margins. Different types of faults also exist within each regime and further serve to differentiate the northern and southern regions' geologic and tectonic histories from one another.

== Geologic history ==
The magmatic record of Central America begins with Permian-Triassic (~283-215 Ma) granites and gneisses of arc affinity, formed in the western margin of Pangea. A second episode comprises Jurassic-Berriasian continental rift volcanism, associated with the opening of the proto-Caribbean and the Gulf of Mexico. The third pulse includes calc-alkaline volcanism and intrusive rocks ranging from Aptian-Ypresian (~124–50 Ma) present in the continental slivers of the Caribbean plate, the MCOT and the Santa Elena and Nicoya units. Between the second and third episodes, there are Jurassic-Cretaceous island arc volcanic rocks of paleo-Pacific origin that got accreted into the GSZ and the Mesquito Composite Oceanic Terrane (MCOT). A fourth pulse is only located in the Talamanca Unit of the Panama plate, of age Maastrichtian-Bartonian (~71–39 Ma), of mainly tholeiitic composition. The fifth and sixth magmatic pulses (Oligocene-Pliocene and Quaternary) define the CAVA, both parallel to the Middle America Trench.

An interesting case of volcanic activity evolution is recorded in Nicaragua, which started ~130 Ma. Nicaragua nowadays has continental crust in its northern part (the Patuca Block), that transitions into oceanic crust (MCOT) up to northwestern Costa Rica (Santa Elena Block, Nicoya Block). Older volcanic rocks crop out in the Patuca Block, dating to the Middle Jurassic (~170 Ma). The ancient Nicaraguan arc comprises a Cretaceous-Eocene ancient arc (~130–50 Ma), an Oligocene-Miocene arc (~30–5 Ma) and the Recent volcanic front. The ancient arc has a more acidic calc-alkaline composition, wheres the Oligocene-Miocene arc is transitional towards basaltic tholeiiic composition, and the volcanic front is mostly basaltic tholeiitic in composition. The causes of these change are not well understood, but one explanation could be that the slab was richer in volatiles during the ancient arc, or the melts could maintain their volatile composition.

This Caribbean-Cocos tectonic plate interaction can further explain the volcanism and geologic history of the region since the Miocene. While previous literature has shown a wide range of ages for the subduction of the Cocos plate, it is now believed that this subduction began between two million years ago and three million years ago (between 2 Ma and 3 Ma), though the area has been geologically active since at least 12 Ma, as evidenced by plate and plate boundary movements, as well as scarp subduction in the area. A gap in volcanism in Central America between 12 Ma and 5 Ma is understood to have occurred as well.

Furthermore, the subduction of the Cocos tectonic plate itself is not thought to be what caused some of the changes in volcanism associated with the Central American Volcanic Arc; while the subduction of the Cocos Ridge is a continual event that has influenced volcanism in Central America, the subduction of the Coiba Ridge—a microplate in the region—is thought to be the triggering event that instigated changes in volcanic activity in the geologic past. In short, the interaction of numerous tectonic plates—namely the Cocos, Caribbean, North American, and Coiba plates—over the past several million years has helped facilitate the continual existence of the Central American Volcanic Arc, influencing the tectonic and broad geologic history of the area.

== Contemporary regional overview ==
The Central American Volcanic Arc consists of hundreds of volcanic formations, including stratovolcanoes, composite volcanoes, calderas, and lava domes. From a depositional standpoint, ash falls, ash flows, and deposits of tephra are prevalent throughout the region. Carbon and argon isotope dating has been used to date these deposits to the Quaternary, and it is suspected that several of these volcanoes have been sporadically active for much of the past 200,000 years.

Some volcanoes in the area have even produced large explosive eruptions in the recent past, including the October 25, 1902, eruption of the Santa Maria volcano in Guatemala. This Plinian eruption spewed upwards of twenty cubic kilometers of ash almost thirty kilometers into the sky. Much of this ash was fine-grained, averaging less than 2 millimeters in size.

Similarly, Cerro Negro, a 250-meter-tall volcano in northwest Nicaragua, erupted in 1971, 1992, and 1995. The two latter eruptions, occurring in the 1990s, had similar magmatic compositions to one another, both broadly basaltic. However, as the water and carbon dioxide contents of each eruption were different—with the earlier eruption having higher levels of carbon dioxide and water vapor, and the later eruption degassing many of its volatiles—markedly different styles of eruption occurred, with the 1992 eruption of Cerro Negro much more explosive than its 1995 counterpart.

Other volcanoes in Central America include the Salvadorian Santa Ana, Izalco, and San Salvador volcanoes, the Nicaraguan Masaya volcano, and the Costa Rican Miravalles, Irazú, and Poás volcanoes. Many remain sporadically active to this day, and likely will continue to be active into the future, as geologic and tectonic processes continue to shape the region.

Graphical representation of a subduction zone

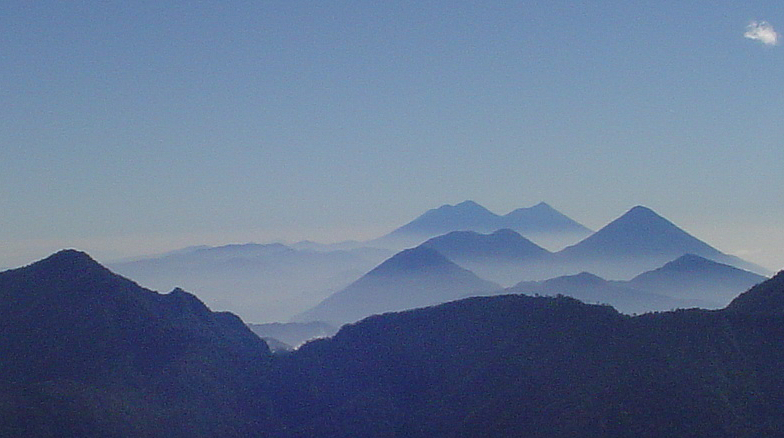
Volcanic front of the Sierra Madre

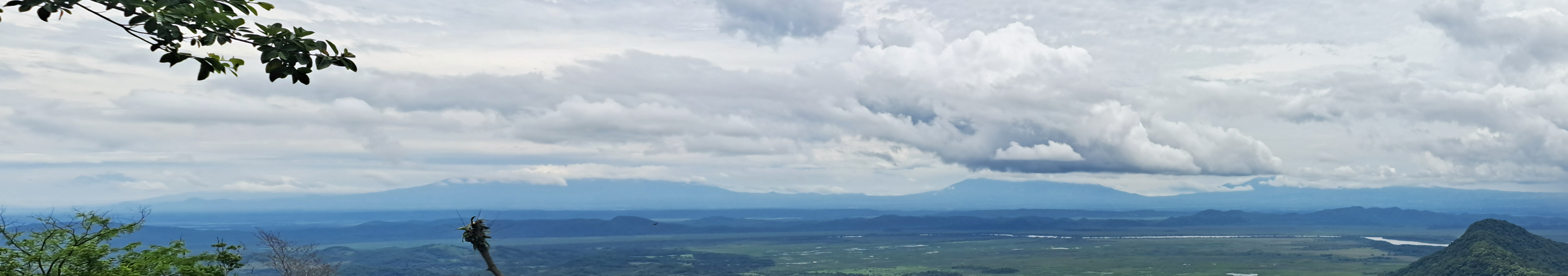
Panoramic view of the Guanacaste Volcanic Range, in northwestern Costa Rica (excluding the Arenal Volcano). From left to right: Orosí Volcano, Rincón de la Vieja Volcano, Miravalles Volcano, Tenorio Volcano.
