= Fule–Malvar Mansion =

Coordinates: 14°04′18″N 121°19′21″E

Fule-Malvar Mansion
- Mansyong Fule-Malvar
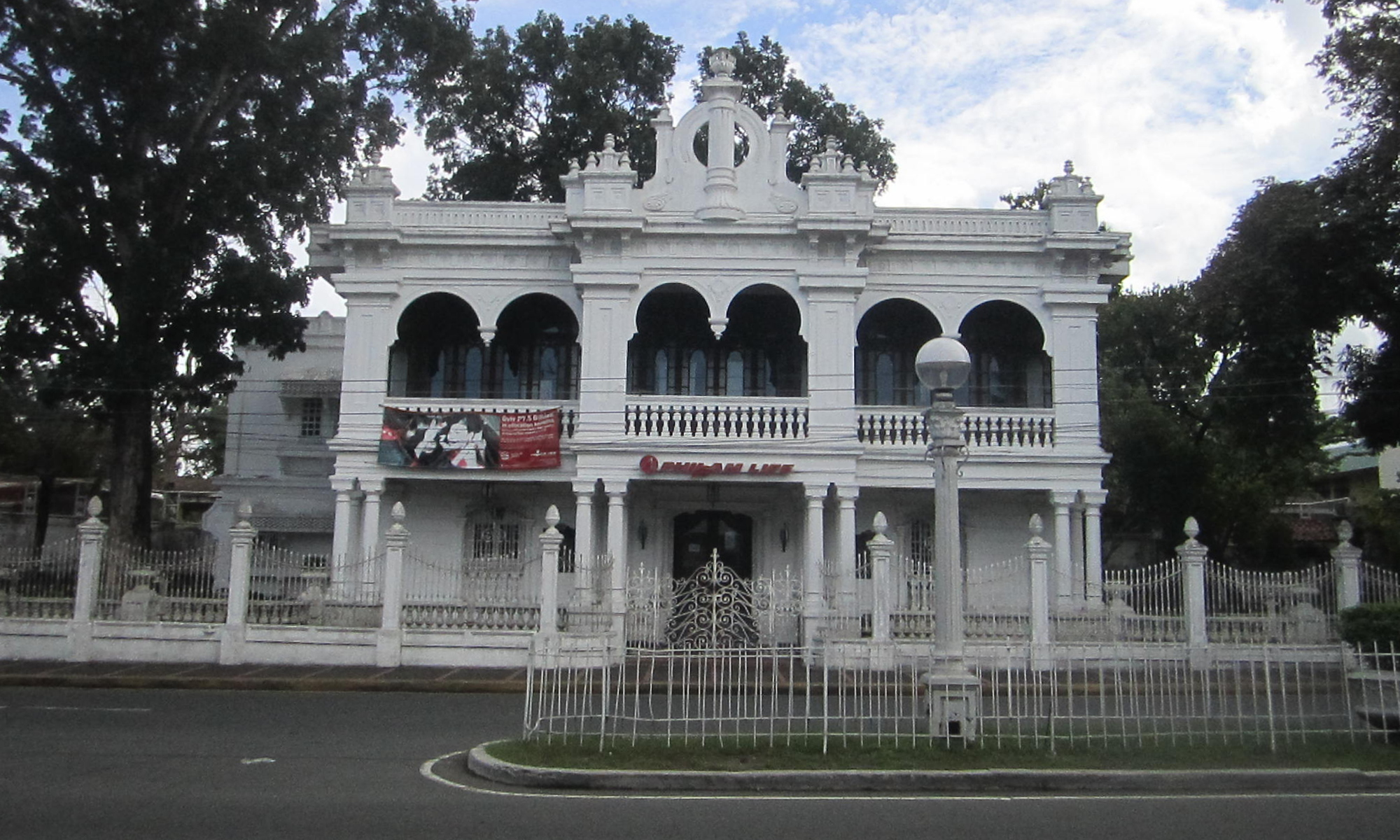
- The house in 2015
- Interactive map of the Fule-Malvar Mansion area
- Alternative names: White house, Puting Bahay

General information
- Architectural style: Romantic Classicism
- Location: Jose Rizal Avenue, San Pablo, Laguna, Philippines
- Completed: 1915

Design and construction
- Architect: Abelardo Lafuente García-Rojo

The Fule-Malvar Mansion, also known as the White House, is a historic house located at San Pablo in Laguna, Philippines.

In 1991, the National Historical Institute placed a historical marker. In 2018, it was declared a heritage edifice by virtue of San Pablo City Local Ordinance 53–2018, which also declared the San Pablo Heritage zone, recognizing its historical and aesthetic significance. The building is protected under the National Cultural Heritage Act.

== History ==
Built by spouses Eusebia Fule and Potenciano Malvar, the first appointed mayor after the approval of Commonwealth Act No. 520 creating the city of San Pablo. The mansion was finished in 1915, designed by architect Abelardo Lafuente García-Rojo.

The mansion provided housing for visiting presidents, government officials and dignitaries like Manuel L. Quezon, Sergio Osmena, Manuel Roxas and Ramon Magsaysay.

The mansion was bequeathed to their nephews and nieces who eventually sold it to National Life Insurance Company in 1966. Acquired in 1988 by the Philippine American Life Insurance Company which restored it to its previous form in 1990 which maintained the building till its departure from the premises in 2021.

In 2022, after repairs, it now houses the 3rd District Congressional Satellite Office, which was vacated in 2025. It now houses the Fule-Malvar Mansion Culture and Arts Center which functions as a gallery and events place for cultural and civic events.
