= San Pablo City Science High School =

Public high school in Laguna, Philippines

San Pablo City Science Integrated High School

Location
- San Pablo City, Laguna, Philippines
- Coordinates: 14°03′52″N 121°20′33″E

Information
- Motto: Non Sine Pulvere Palma
- Grades: 7 to 12

The San Pablo City Science Integrated High School (Filipino: Mataas na Paaralang Pang-Agham ng Lungsod ng San Pablo) is a secondary public science high school system located in San Pablo City, Laguna, Philippines.

It is a DepEd-recognized science high school and was formally inaugurated on August 25, 2005.
