= Doña Prudencia D. Fule Ancestral House =

Doña Prudencia Fule Ancestral House
- Bahay Ancestral ni Doña Prudencia Fule
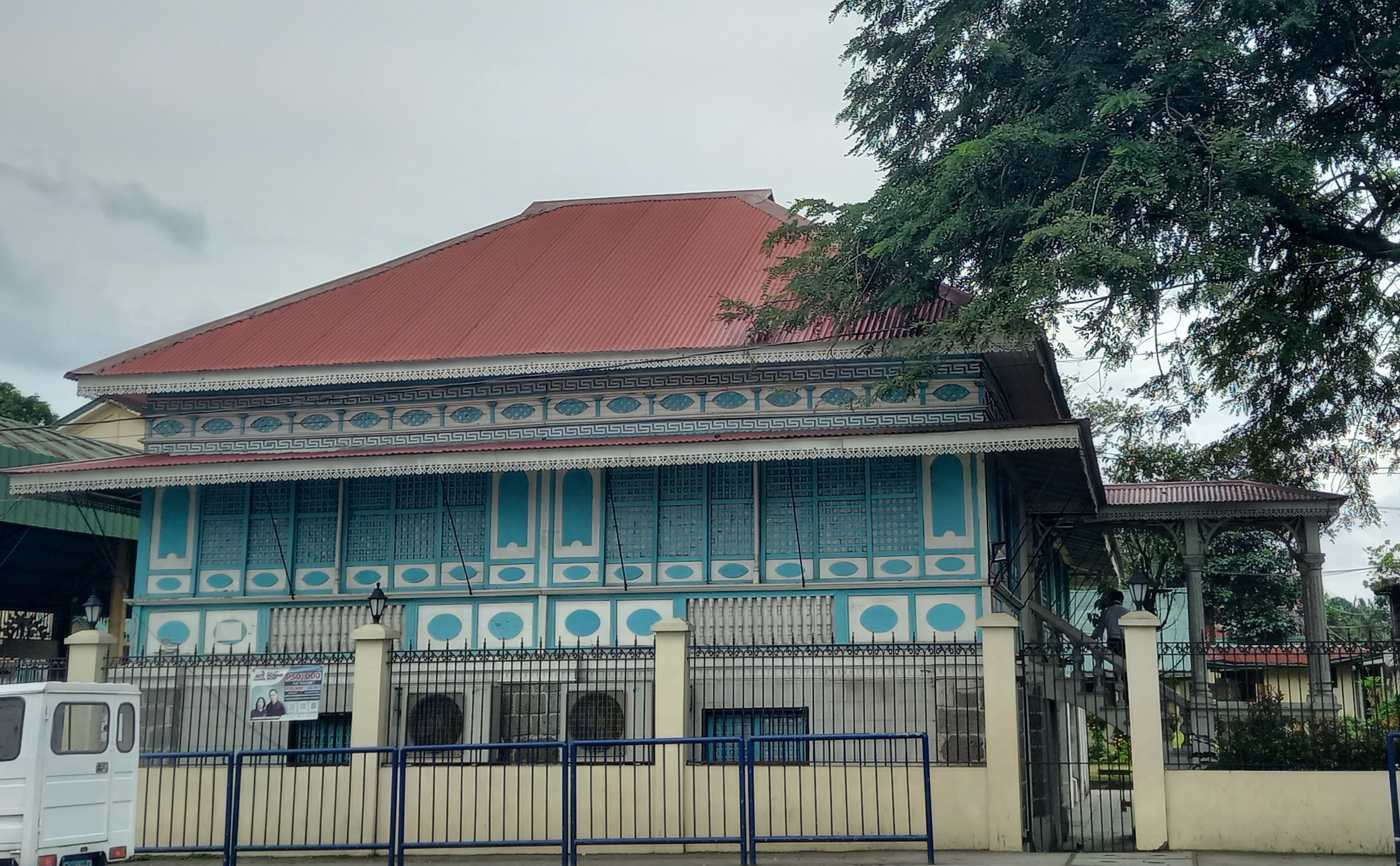
- Doña Prudencia D. Fule Ancestral House in 2024
- Alternative names: Bahay ni Lola, Bahay ni Doña Uden

General information
- Location: Brgy. San Nicolas, San Pablo, Laguna, Philippines
- Year built: 1890s
- Governing body: Local government of the city of San Pablo, National Historical Commission of the Philippines

The Doña Prudencia D. Fule Ancestral House is an expansive bahay na bato ancestral house in San Pablo, Laguna.

In 2019, it was declared a heritage edifice by virtue of San Pablo City Local Ordinance 53–2018, which also declared the San Pablo Heritage zone, recognizing its historical and aesthetic significance.

== History ==
The house was the residence of Roberta Diones and Benedicto Fule - a member of the wealthy Fule clan of San Pablo- Alaminos, as well as their children.

The large bahay na bato, built in the twilight of the Spanish occupation of the Philippines, was a gateway landmark for San Pablo, then still under the jurisdiction of the province of Batangas. The house was a hiding spot for Miguel Malvar, a Philippine Revolution General and brother of Potenciano Malvar, husband of Eusebia Fule and first appointed mayor of San Pablo.

The last of the Fule children to live in the house was Prudencia D. Fule, also known as Doña Uden, a spinster and benefactress- donating large portions of her inherited land to build a school in the 1930s, named in her honor, the Prudencia D. Fule Memorial Elementary School.

Upon her death and in the absence of a will, her executors, with the initiative of the local community donated the house and the surrounding lands to the local government of San Pablo. Claimants who maintained they were the heirs of the estate occupied the house in the early 2000s.

After a lengthy court battle, in 2005, the house was returned to the local government, from which it was turned to an annex of San Pablo City National High School. In 2006, it was renamed Prudencia D. Fule Memorial National High School.

In 2018, the ancestral house, along with other structures of historic and cultural significance was declared a heritage edifice by the city council of San Pablo. It is also included in the San Pablo Heritage zone.

In 2020, upon the initiative of the local government and support of then Antique congresswoman Loren Legarda, the house was restored under the supervision of the National Historical Commission of the Philippines. Still a part of the high school which holds regular functions, it also houses the Museum for Industrial Arts and Economics.
