= San Pablo Heritage zone =

San Pablo Heritage Zone
- Sonang pamana ng San Pablo (Tagalog)
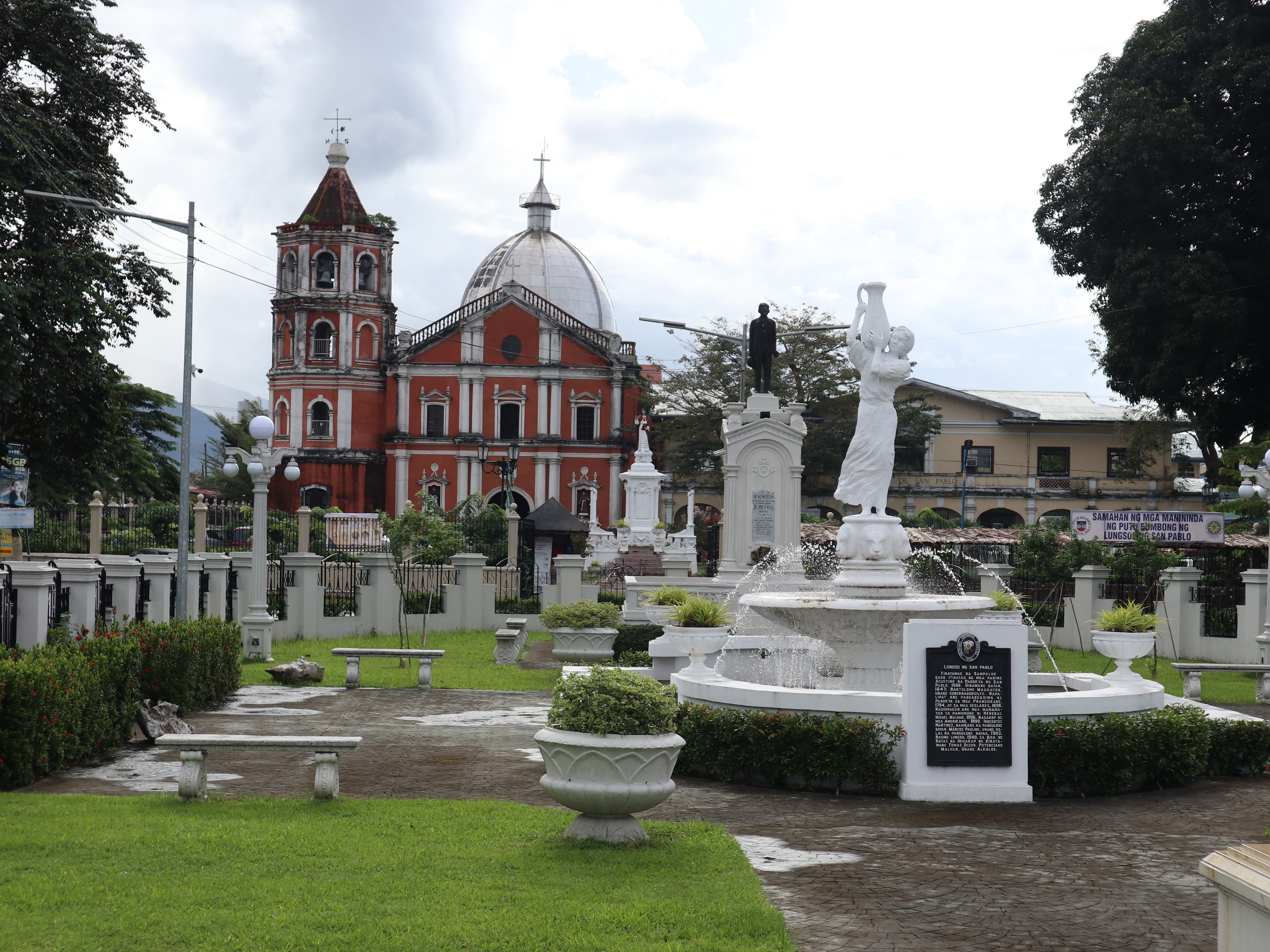
- San Pablo city plaza, containing the Rizal monument and the San Pablo historical marker with Saint Paul the First Hermit Cathedral parish church and the Liceo de San Pablo in the background

Site notes
- Architect: various
- Architectural styles: Spanish colonial era in the Philippines, American colonial era in the Philippines, post war, Art deco, Beaux-Arts
- Governing body: Local government of the City of San Pablo, National Historical Commission of the Philippines

San Pablo Heritage zone or The city of San Pablo Heritage zone (Tagalog: Sonang pamana ng San Pablo), is a location in San Pablo, Laguna containing built structures from the Spanish and American colonial era, historical monuments and objects of historical and cultural significance.

== Background ==
San Pablo is one of the oldest documented settlements in the Philippines. In 1586, Captain Juan de Salcedo arrived in the village of Sampaloc, an upland community of Tagalog and Aeta.

Geographically, the city is the heart of the Laguna Volcanic Field, which explains the abundance of unique geological structures such as the crater lakes, hills and others.

Politically and economically, San Pablo is one of the most prosperous cities in the country in the early 20th century, owing to its main produce of coconuts. It is also the first city in the province of Laguna as established by Commonwealth Act no. 520.

The city is also home to the see of the Roman Catholic Bishop of San Pablo, a diocese which oversees catholic churches in the province of Laguna.

As expressed in City Ordinance (CO) 2018–53 by the local government of San Pablo, the San Pablo Heritage zone was established to preserve and enshrine the legacy and history of the city.

== Boundaries ==
The area covers:

- The core zone
  - Bounded on the North by the San Pablo Cathedral at the corner of T. Azucena and Magcase Sts.
  - M. Paulino St. to the railroad track intersection of Colago Avenue and Rizal Avenue
  - 700 meter stretch of the city's main thoroughfare- Rizal avenue to the railroad track intersection of Colago Avenue and Rizal Avenue
- Historical sites identified included City Ordinance (CO) 2018-53 outside the core zone
- Buffer zones as defined by the National Historical Commission of the Philippines

== Structures included ==
Listed below are structures included in the heritage zone.

| Image | Name of structure | Location | Description | Year completed | Notes |
|---|---|---|---|---|---|
| | San Pablo Old Capitol building | 14.0746 ° N, 121.3249° E | Designed by Arch. Antonio Toledo in the Neoclassical style, this American colonial era structure was the seat of municipal power. Currently houses the Museo de San Pablo. | 1940 | |
| | Saint Paul the First Hermit Cathedral -Parish church | 14° 04.187N 121° 19.591E | Seat of the Roman Catholic Bishop of the Diocese of San Pablo, which encompasses all of Laguna Province. | 1721 | |
| Library Hub, San Pablo City, Laguna | DepEd Library Hub (Old CFI Building/ Casa Real) | 14.07041, 121.32588 | Was once the site of the Casa Real. Now contains a library. | 1950s | |
| Fule-Malvar Mansion 20150802 | Fule- Malvar Mansion | 14° 04′ 16.72″ N, 121° 19′ 20.93″ E | Built by spouses Eusebia Fule and Potenciano Malvar, the first appointed mayor | 1915 | |
| Spanish colonial-era mansion of Doña Prudencia D. Fule, a benefactress from San Pablo, Laguna | Doña Prudencia Fule Ancestral House | 14.0678,12129574 | An expansive bahay na bato of Doña Prudencia Fule, a local benefactress. | 1845 | |
| An example of gabaldon building in San Pablo City, Laguna | Prudencia Fule Memorial Elementary School | 14,06820, 121,29574 | Site of the an American colonial era schoolhouse known as a Gabaldon. Land donated and named after Doña Prudencia Fule. | 1930s | |
| Manila Railroad's San Pablo station in 1923 | San Pablo Railway station | 14.0689 ° N, 121.3213° E | American colonial era railway station instrumental to the transport of coconuts, the city's major cash crop | 1911 | |
| | San Pablo Municipal Cemetery | 14.06301, 121.32306 | Completed in 1937, the cemetery serves as the final resting place for locals and prominent San Pableños | 1937 | |
| | San Pablo Red Cross/ Puericulture center Former site of the Escuela Pia | 14.06988, 121.32570 | Site of the Escuela Pia, the first school in the city established in the Spanish era. Now occupied by the Red cross and Puericulture center | 1953 | |
| San Pablo Central School (Jose Rizal Avenue, San Pablo, Laguna; August 10, 2022) | San Pablo Central School | 14.0713 ° N, 121.3230° E | Formerly known as the San Pablo Intermediate School. Contains a multitude of American colonial era schoolhouse known as Gabaldons. | 1910s | |
| | San Diego Elementary School | 14.09197, 121.35507 | Formerly known as Balintawak Elementary school, the site contains the American colonial era schoolhouse known as the Gabaldon. | American colonial era | |
| Heritage Edifice in San Pablo city, Laguna | Don Alfonso Farcon Residence | 14.0701, 121.3266 | Built in the American colonial style, it is the home of Don Alfonso Farcon, first municipal president of San Pablo | 1950s | |
| | Franklin Baker company | 14.0662339, 121.3221727 | One of the oldest American companies in the city processing coconuts | 1947 | |
| San Pablo Telegraphia Building at San Pablo City, Laguna | San Pablo Telegraph building | 14.0702, 121.3258 | The city's telegraph office | 1960s | |
| | San Pablo Fire department building | 14.07045, 121.32586 | The city's fire department building | 1930s | |
| Hagdang Bato, San Pablo City, Laguna | Hagdang bato at Sampaloc lake | 14.0744 ° N, 121.3263° E | one of the oldest constructed access points to Sampaloc lake | 1915 | |
| | San Pablo Plaza | 14.07032, 121.29574 | The city's main public square, where the Brothers Juan and Epitacio Belen, Spanish era martyrs were drawn and quartered. Contains a statue of Dr. Jose Rizal- one of the oldest monuments to the hero in Laguna, a historic fountain and the historic marker for the city of San Pablo | late 1910s | |
| Doña Leonila Urban Park, San Pablo City, Laguna | Doña Leonila Park | 14.0784° N, 121.3255 ° E | A public park named after Doña Leonila Garcia, 8th First Lady of the Republic of the Philippines | late 1960s | |
| Dambana ng Kagitingan, Memorial for the WW2 Battle of Mt. Kalisungan, San Pablo City, Laguna | Dambana ng kagitingan | 14.0784 ° N, 121.3255° E | Monument to the WWII veterans of San Pablo City | 1972 | |
| San Pablo City Barangays Landmarks | Gat. Andres Bonifacio Shrine | 14°18'44"N 121°6'0"E | Monument to Andres Bonifacio, Father of the KKK movement | 1997 | |
| San Pablo City Barangays Landmarks | Trese Martires Monument | 14°18'44"N 121°6'0"E | Monument to the Thirteen martyrs of Cavite, collaborators of the KKK | | |
| | Apolinario Mabini monument | 14.0709 ° N, 121.3237° E | Monument to Apolinario Mabini, the sublime paralytic | 1950s | |
| | Pinaglabanan Shrine | 14.09197, 121.35508 | Memorial site of the first Filipino-American uprising in the city against the invading Japanese Imperial Army. | 1997 | |
| | Guerilla Shrine | 14.1141° N, 121.3003° E | Memorial site of the Battle of Mt. Kalisungan, the last Filipino – American uprising in the City of San Pablo against the Japanese Imperial Army | 2000 | |
| | Lina Building | 14.0711 ° N, 121.3234° E | Site of the Spanish-era Controlled Merchandize Building, now a commercial building | postwar | |
| Mango Tree of San Pablo Bayan, Laguna, July 2023 | Century old Mango tree | 14.0698, 121.3258 | A city landmark and largest tree in the main plaza area | ca. 1899 | |

== Heritage markers ==
Listed below are heritage markers in the city of San Pablo as installed by the National Historical Commission of the Philippines and its predecessors, the Philippine Historical Committee and the National Historical Institute.

| Image | Name of marker | Location | Year installed | Notes |
|---|---|---|---|---|
| San Pablo City (Laguna) historical marker | Lunsod ng San Pablo | San Pablo Plaza 14.07032, 121.29574 | 1954 | |
| | Katedral ng San Pablo | 14° 04.187N, 121° 19.591E | 1986 | |
| Fule Malvar Mansion historical marker | Mansiyong Fule Malvar | 14° 04′ 16.72″ N, 121° 19′ 20.93″ E | 1991 | |
| | Villa Escudero (Note: Transboundary site within jurisdictions of San Pablo, Laguna and Dolores and Tiaong municipalities of Quezon province) | 13° 59′ 42.48″ N, 121° 20′ 31.53″ E | 1984 | |
