= Jojo Acuin =

Filipino psychic (1946–2010)

- Born: Jose Maria Villanueva Acuin; May 30, 1946; San Pablo, Laguna, Philippines
- Died: April 29, 2010 (aged 63); Quezon City, Philippines
- Occupation: Psychic
- Years active: 1990–2008

Jose Maria Villanueva Acuin, better known as Jojo Acuin (May 30, 1946 – April 29, 2010) was a Filipino psychic. He was dubbed the "Nostradamus of Asia and the Pacific."

== Career ==
In 2000, Acuin had numerous predictions. He predicted that George W. Bush would become president and that Hillary Clinton would be elected as senator. He predicted the Payatas landslide. He predicted the pregnancy of Lucy Torres-Gomez and Sharon Cuneta. He also predicted one of the Rizal Day bombings in a light rail station on December 30. In 1987, Acuin had a prediction that "a mediaman in Cebu will soon die". A local journalist was then shot dead by communists.

== Other ventures ==
He had a program in Angel Radio 1026 named "Hula-La", which was aired from 2 to 3 p.m. His program contains predictions. In the early 2000s, PLDT opened a business with Acuin by advertising a hotline where you can call for him to do Fortune-telling by paying P10 a minute.

== Death ==
Acuin was diagnosed with diabetes mellitus in October 2009. He then developed pneumonia and was hospitalized on March 19, 2010. He died from cardiac arrest after several of his internal organs failed at the Philippine Heart Center on April 29, 2010 at exactly 11:25 a.m. He was 63 years old. His body was laid to rest in San Pablo, Laguna.

== Filmography ==
=== Movies ===
- Takbo...Talon...Tili!!! (1992) (segment "Mahiwagang Banga")
- The Vizconde Massacre Story: God Help Us! (1993)
- The Untold Story: Vizconde Massacre 2 - God Have Mercy on Us (1994)
- Feng Shui (2004)
