= Abelardo Lafuente García-Rojo =

Spanish architect (1871–1931)

Abelardo Lafuente García-Rojo (30 April 1871 in Fuentidueña de Tajo (Madrid) – 1931 in Shanghai) was a Spanish architect and entrepreneur who had his own studio in colonial Shanghai. Between 1913 and 1931 he was the only Spaniard to have an architectural studio registered in the city; Lafuente collaborated with several contemporary architects. Lafuente blended the Mozarabic and Moorish styles from Spain into Chinese architecture. In 2009, the Spanish architect Álvaro Leonardo Pérez established the Lafuente Research Project. The findings of this project were first presented at the Shanghai World Expo in 2010 in collaboration with the Instituto Cervantes. The Lafuente Research Project is ongoing. Alvaro Leonardo Perez earned a PhD Architect with his work about Abelardo Lafuente in 2019 at the Universidad de Alcala de Henares and launched the official website with all the information related to his work.

== History ==
Lafuente's professional career began in Manila. His studio was named A. Lafuente Architect & Contractor. In 1913 Lafuente moved to Shanghai where he opened a new studio named A. Lafuente Garcia-Rojo, Architect & Contractor. Later, Lafuente joined American architect G. O. Wootten to form the Lafuente & Wootten studio. The two architects worked together for several years, their most notable work being the ballroom at the Astor House Hotel, built in 1917. After this period he maintained the studio on his own and called it A. Lafuente Gª Rojo Architect. Afterwards he partnered with Russian architect A. J. Yaron, changing the studio's name once again to Lafuente & Yaron.

For the better part of the following 10 years Lafuente worked for the biggest hotel company in Asia at the time: the Hong Kong and Shanghai Hotels Ltd., rehabilitating and refurbishing their buildings. His most important work during this project was the Majestic Hotel (1924) where he designed its new ballroom (the most luxurious in Asia at that time). Some of his other projects included churches, mosques, private villas, apartment buildings, movie theaters, private clubs, and hospitals, among others.

His reputation in the Spanish colony is described in the book by Vicente Blasco Ibáñez, La vuelta al mundo de un novelista. Spanish entrepreneur Antonio Ramos was his most important influence during his time in China and his most outstanding client. Ramos brought motion pictures to China. Lafuente was commissioned to build some of Ramos' most important cinemas including Olympic and Victoria among others. The other relevant project he built for Ramos in Shanghai was his Summer Mansion (1924) known nowadays as "Little Alhambra" of Shanghai. It located in Hongkou district. It is next to a plot owned also by Antonio Ramos and had the Ramos Apartments designed and built by him again, and it is nowadays recognized as the place where the chinese writer Lu Xun was living for several years.

Lafuente also worked in North America. In Los Angeles and in Tijuana he built houses. During 1927–1930, Lafuente maintained operations in Shanghai while he developed his business in California and Mexico. At the end of this period, after being significantly affected by the Crash of 1929, he decided to return to Shanghai and undertake more projects there. He died in Shanghai at the Shanghai General Hospital in 1931, aged 60.

== Recognitions ==
On June 11, 2026, in his hometown of Fuentidueña de Tajo, the new "Abelardo Lafuente García-rojo Promenade" was dedicated to him. It is a newly built promenade between the Alarilla Public School and the Villa de Fuentidueña Performing Arts Center, since he is the most illustrious figure of this town located in the Community of Madrid.
