= San Pablo City National High School =

Public high school in Laguna, Philippines

San Pablo City Integrated High School
- Mataas na Paaralang Pinagsama ng Lungsod ng San Pablo (Filipino)
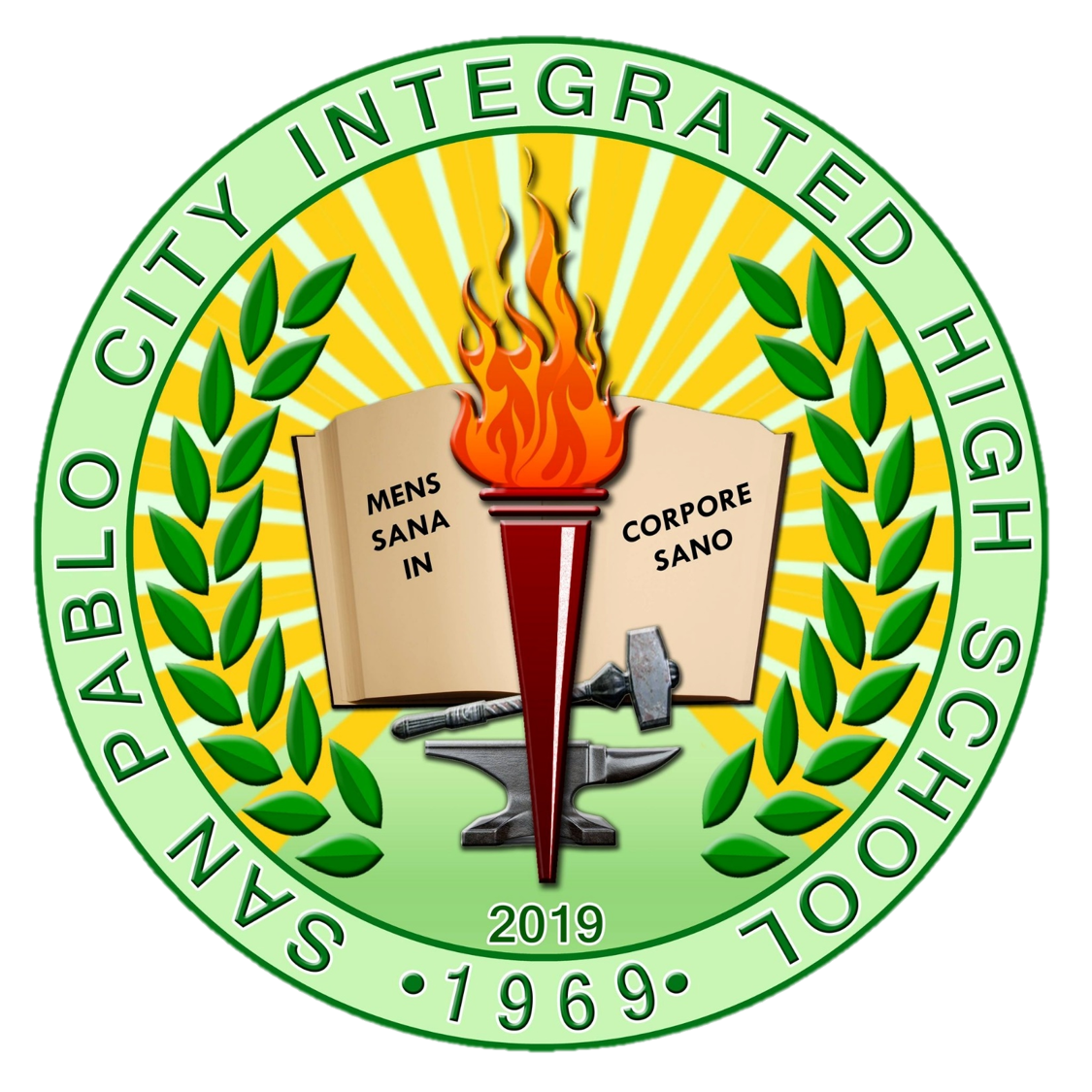

Location
- F. Mariño St., Lakeside Park Subdivision, Barangay VI-D; Calabarzon; San Pablo City, Laguna; Philippines
- Coordinates: 14°04′36″N 121°19′15″E

Information
- Former names: San Pablo City High School; San Pablo City National High School-Main; San Pablo City National High School
- Type: Public
- Motto: Mens sana in corpore sano
- Established: March 3, 1969
- Principal: Cristeta S. Uy (2023 - present)
- Grades: 7 to 12

San Pablo City Integrated High School (formerly known as San Pablo City National High School) (Filipino: Mataas na Paaralang Pinagsama ng Lungsod ng San Pablo) is one of the public secondary schools of San Pablo City, Philippines. Located in F. Mariño St., Lakeside Park Subdivision, Brgy. VI-D, San Pablo City, it provides free secondary education for the people of the city and neighboring towns .

Abbreviated as SPCIHS, it is colloquially nicknamed "City High".

== History ==
In 1969, councilor of San Pablo City Jose C. Reyes filed a city resolution for the establishment of a public high school. The school was founded on March 3, 1969, and was called "San Pablo City High School." Dionisia C. De Roma, a Schools Division Supervisor was assigned- in-charge of the newly created secondary school.

In 1994, the status of the school changed from city to national as prescribed by Republic Act No. 6655signed into law on May 26, 1988, by President Corazon Aquino. The name was changed to "San Pablo City National High School."

In the 1990s, SPCNHS added annexes in different barangays of the city due to the unprecedented increase of enrollees that could no longer be accommodated in the school campus. Thus, it was known as "San Pablo City National High School-Main"

In the 2000s, each annex became an independent public high school, thus dropping the "main" campus title and the sole bearer of the name "San Pablo City Integrated High School".

With the introduction of Republic Act 10533 or the Enhanced Basic Education Act of 2013, SPCNHS was primed to be one of the implementers of the Senior High School Program, along with the already existing Junior High School Program. Upon the approval of the program, it was henceforth named "San Pablo City Integrated High School" (SPCIHS).

== Former Annexes ==
| Annex Number | Name of School | Institionalized | Year Separated |
|---|---|---|---|
| Main* | San Pablo City National High School | 1969 | N/A |
| I | | | |
| II | | | |
| III | Sto. Angel National High School | 1995 | 2013 |
| IV | Del Remedio National High School | 1995 | |
| V | Col. Lauro D. Dizon Memorial National High School (CLDDMNHS) | 1996 | |
| VI | | | |
| VII | | | |

- Santisimo Rosario Integrated High School(SRIHS)
- San Bartolome Integrated High School (SBIHS) (formerly known as Purificacion Quijano Bueser National High School)
- San Jose Integrated High School (SJIHS)
- Dolores National High School
- San Isidro National High School
- San Vicente National High School
- Prudencia D. Fule Memorial National High School (formerly known as San Pablo City Integrated High School-San Nicolas Extension)

== School Principals ==
- Dionisia C. De Roma ("Assigned-in-charge", 1969)
- Rodolfo A. Viray (1st School Principal, 1971- 1993)
- Severino C. Buno (Officer-in- charge,1993-1994)
- Luis B. Mendoza (1995-1996)
- Ricardo T. Manalo (1996-2002)
- Marilou D. Bicomong (2002-2007)
- Muriel Andrea V. Maghirang (Officer-in- charge, 2007-2009)
- Laila R. Maloles (2009 to 2015)
- Roldan Acuin (2015 to 2017)
- Editha Fule (2017–2020)
- Lina Laguras (2021– 2023)
- Cristeta S. Uy (2023-2025)
- Denward R. Pacia (2025-present)

== Curricular Programs ==
Defunct

- Night High School

Junior High School

- Special Science Curriculum
- Special Program in Journalism
- Special Program for the Arts
- "Regular" Junior High School Program

Senior High School

- Accountancy, Business and Management (ABM) Strand
- Humanities and Social Sciences (HUMSS) Strand

Alternative Learning System (ALS)

- Balik Paaralan para sa Out-of-School Adults (BP-OSA)

== Faculty and Staff ==
San Pablo City National High School has 8 academic departments, led by a head teacher. In addition, administrative, finance, and other support staff are headed by a secondary school principal.
