= Franklin Baker Company =

American coconut product company

- The current Franklin Baker Company logo
- Headquarters: Memphis, Tennessee, United States
- Number of locations: 2 (United States and the Philippines)

Baker's coconut vintage ad showing boxed and canned forms of coconut

Franklin Baker Company is a manufacturer and exporter of desiccated and processed coconut products in the United States and internationally, established in 1897. The company manufactures the retail coconut brand Baker's Coconut.

The business coconut products are manufactured in San Pablo and Davao del Sur, in the Philippines. The company also operates marketing offices in Memphis, Tennessee, United States, and Northolt, United Kingdom.

== History ==
Franklin Baker (1846–1923) was a flour miller in Philadelphia and started the business's desiccated coconut business in 1894 after he received a cargo of fresh coconuts from Cuba in payment for a consignment of flour he exported. Baker searched for a buyer for the coconuts, and became convinced there was an untapped market for coconut. He came across a small business in Arch Street, Philadelphia, which was about to fold. Mr. Baker bought it for a few thousand dollars and with his boatload of coconuts he entered the coconut business. By 1897, Franklin Baker made so much progress with his new product that he decided to sell his flour business to concentrate on his coconut business. Thereafter, Franklin Baker Jr. joined his father in the business that eventually became known as the Franklin Baker Company.

Baker's Coconut grew to become the foremost supplier of coconut products in the United States.

In 1913, manufacturing facilities were moved to Brooklyn, New York.

In 1921, he and his son, Franklin Baker Jr., put up plant facilities in Santa Mesa, Manila.

Looking for a primary source of coconuts, he went to the Philippines. Franklin Baker began processing coconut in the Philippines in 1922 at a plant in Sta. Mesa, Manila. This gave birth to the Franklin Baker Company of the Philippines. The original intention was to process coconuts in the Philippines to supply their New Jersey plant with desiccated coconut instead of importing whole nuts from the Caribbean countries.

In 1924 the business was relocated to Hoboken, New Jersey.

General Foods Corporation acquired the Franklin Baker Company in 1927, and operations were transferred to a bigger and modern factory in San Pablo City in Laguna, in close proximity to abundant coconut supply. During the Second World War, the San Pablo plant sustained heavy damage due to the bombings. Operations were thus moved back to the United States to ensure continuity of the business. Fresh coconuts from Puerto Rico and Jamaica were brought to the Hoboken plant for processing. Eventually, the San Pablo plant was rebuilt in 1947 at its current location.

In 1964, the U.S. processing facility was moved from Hoboken to Dover, Delaware. By this time, all the base processing was being done in the Philippines while the Dover plant sweetened, toasted and creamed the desiccated coconut for industrial and retail customers.

In 1968, General Foods put up another plant for Franklin Baker in Davao to ensure a steady coconut supply for its manufacture.

In 1987, Philip Morris, owners of General Foods, bought Kraft, and the Franklin Baker desiccated coconut products were put into the Kraft Food Ingredients Group. The Franklin Baker desiccated coconut products were branded as Baker’s. In 2004, Kraft sold the Franklin Baker industrial product lines to the investment company Andorra Investments Corporation.

In 2025, Andorra Investments sold FB to Metro Pacific Investments Corporation.
