= San Pablo, Laguna =

Component city in Laguna, Philippines

San Pablo Lungsod ng San Pablo
- Component city
- City of San Pablo
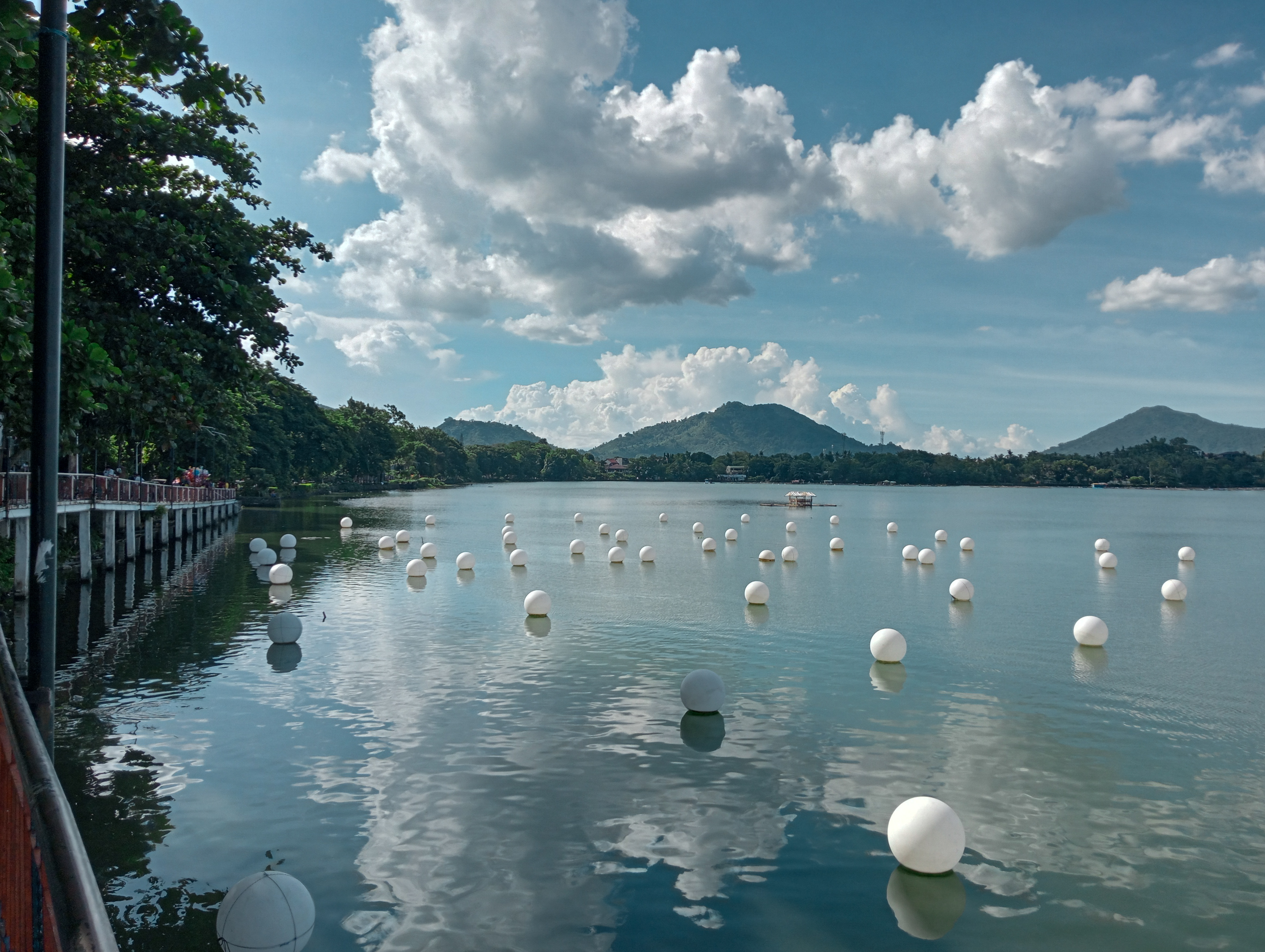
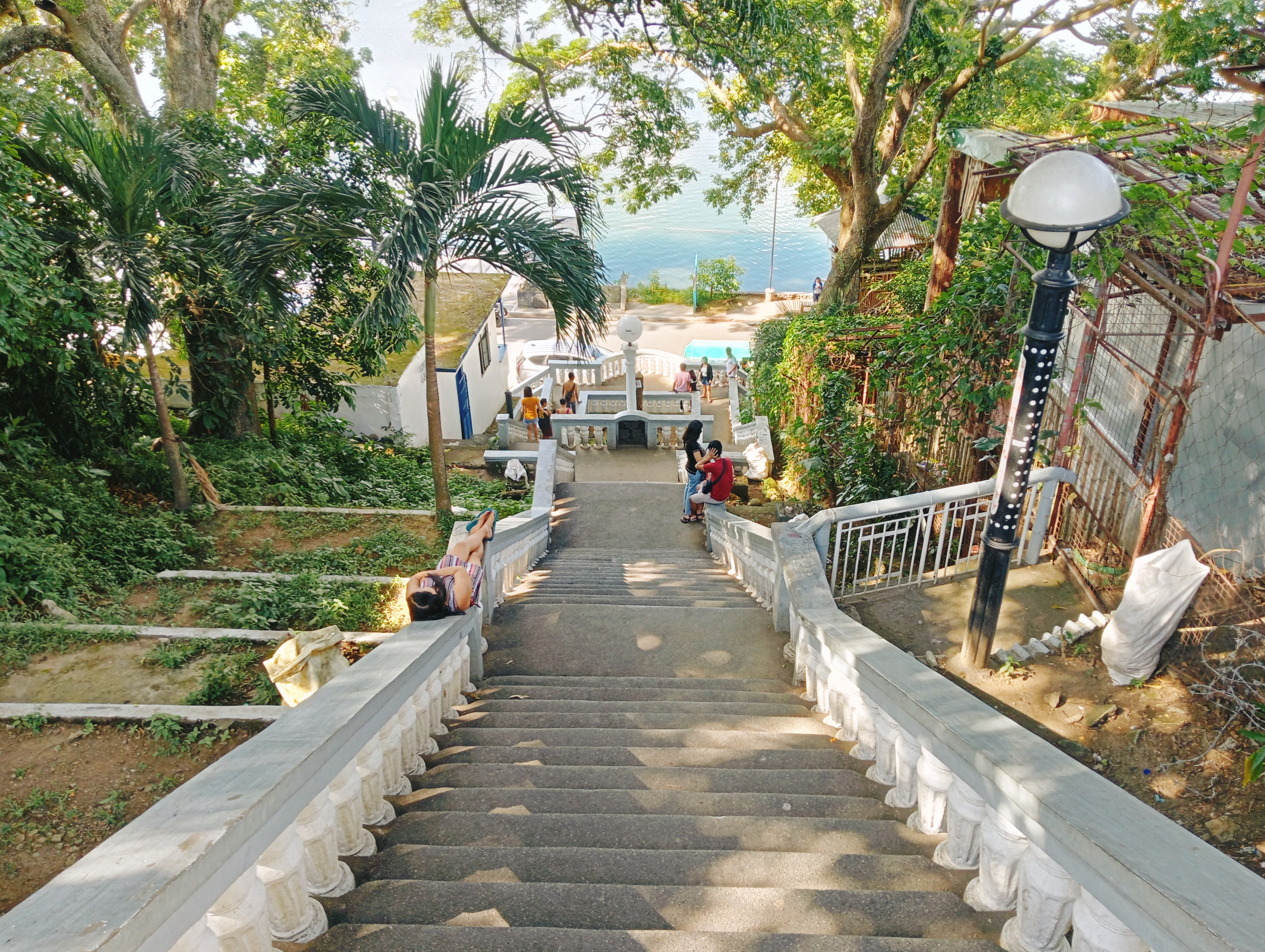
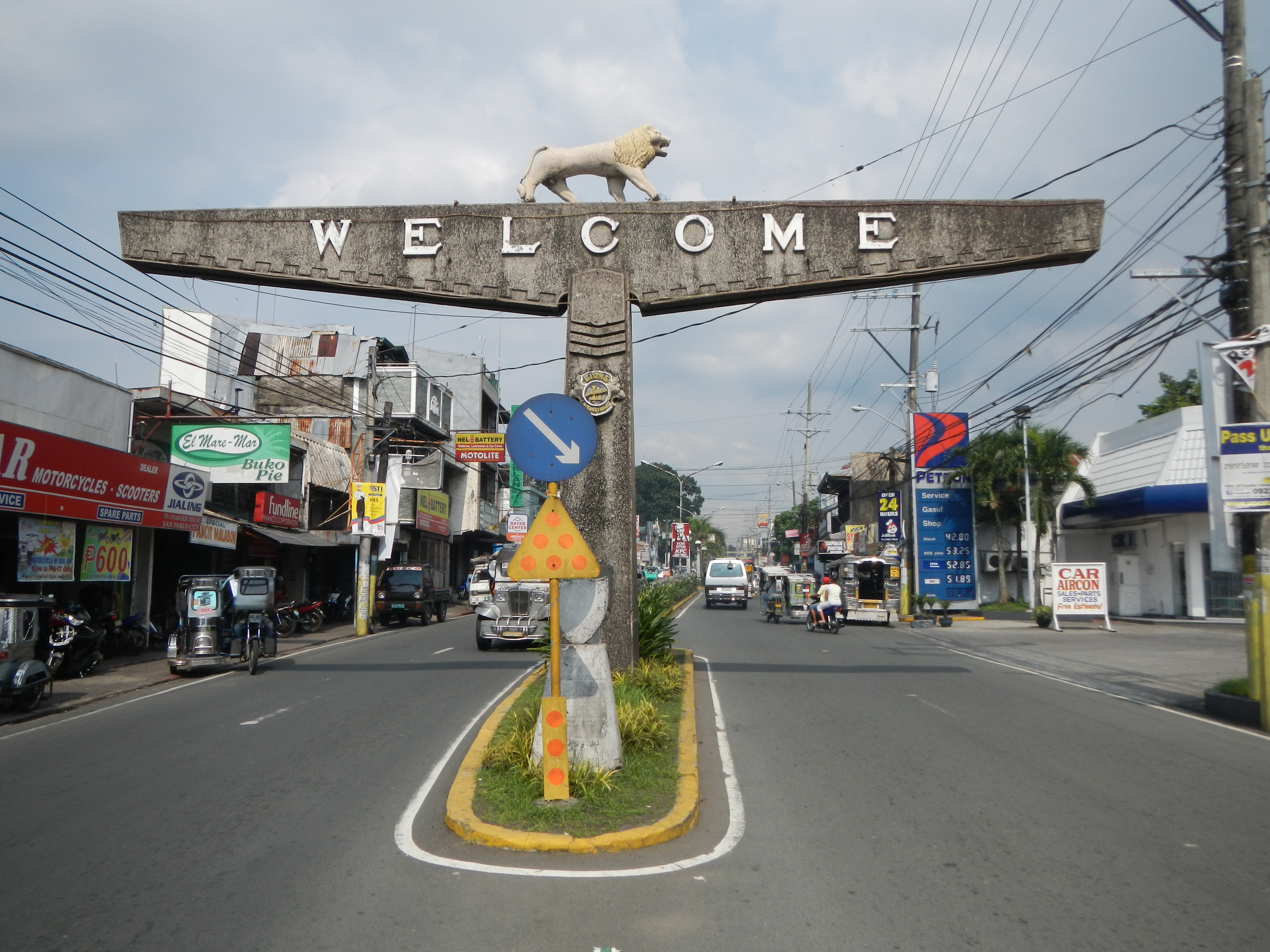
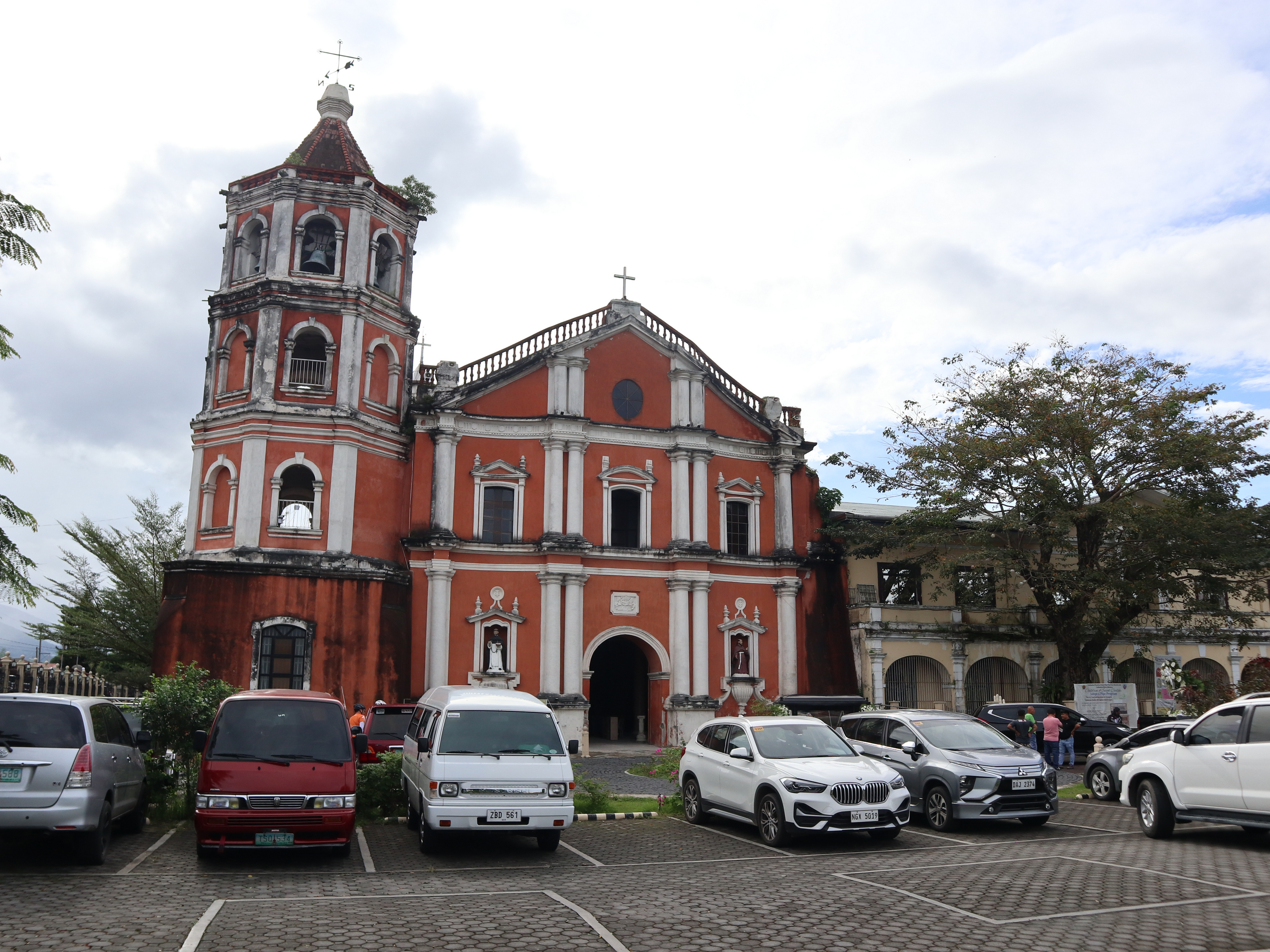
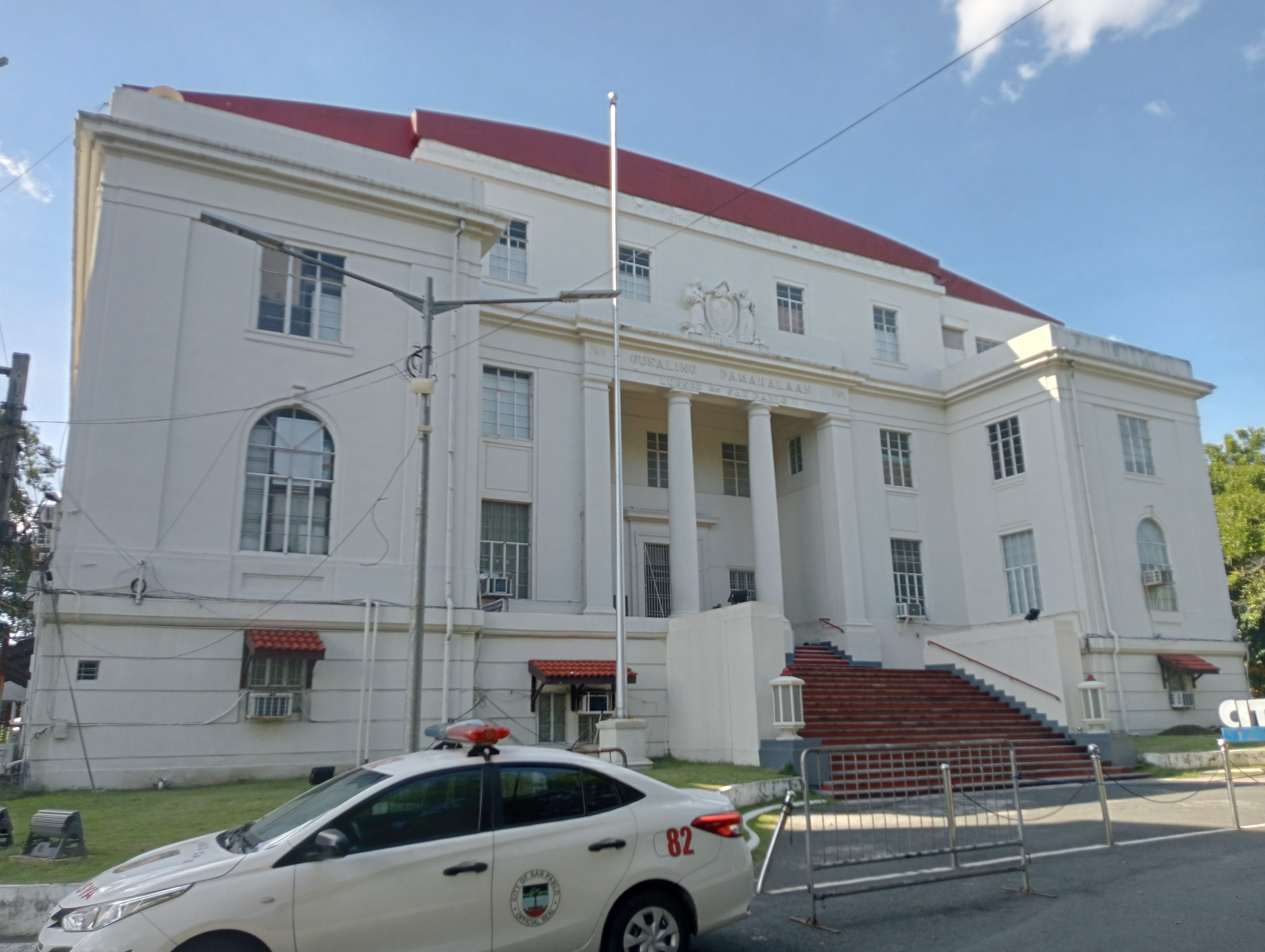
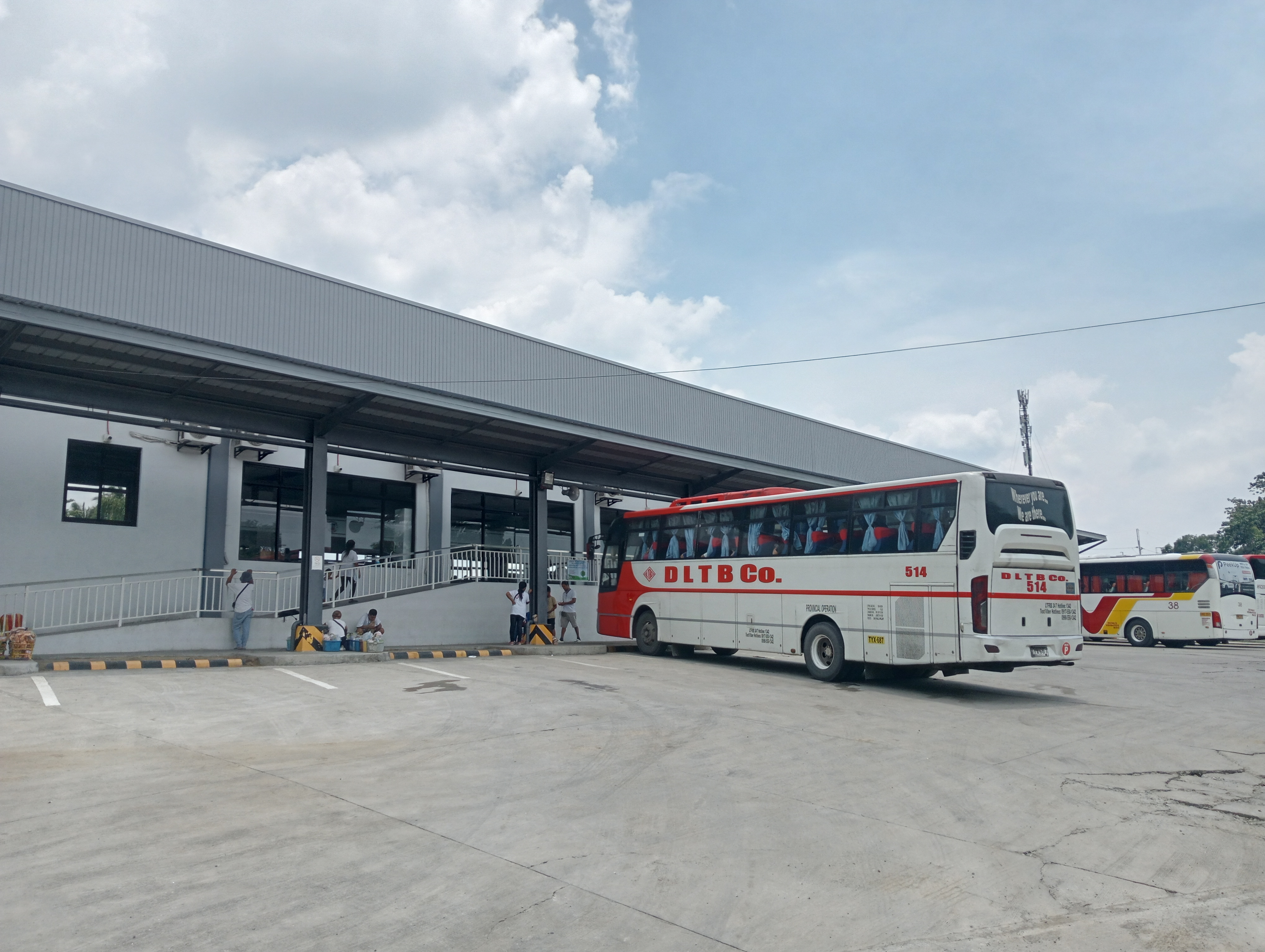
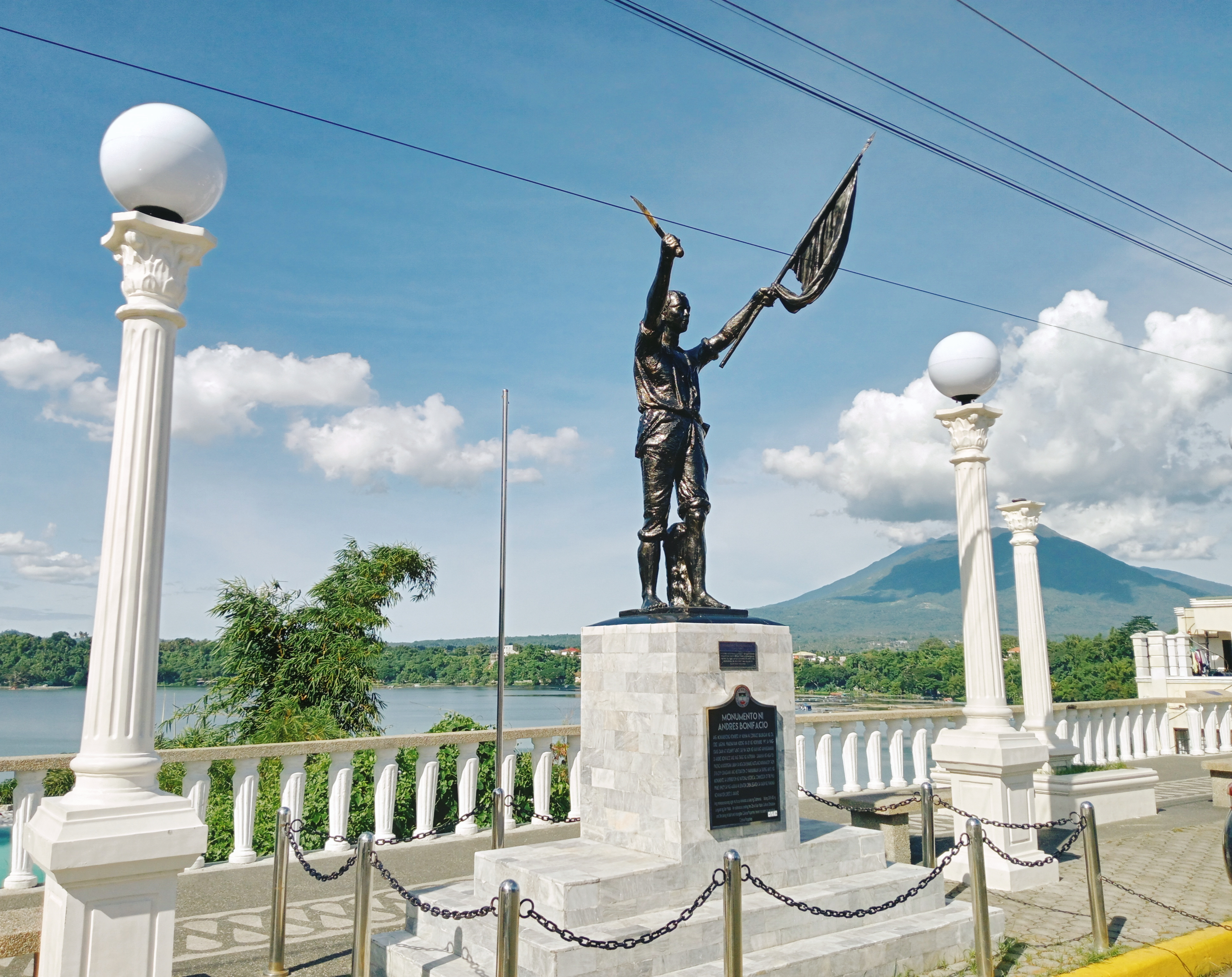
- Sampaloc Lake Hagdang Bato San Pablo Welcome Arch Saint Paul the First Hermit Cathedral City Hall of San Pablo San Pablo Central Terminal SM San Pablo Andres Bonifacio Monument

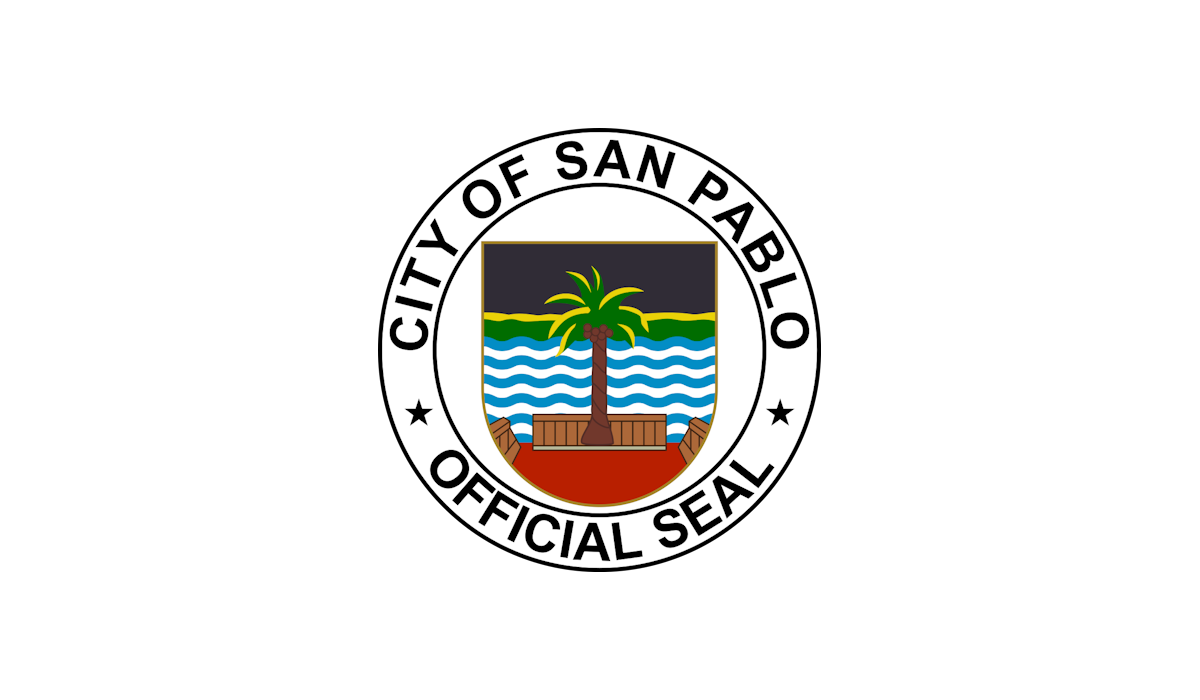
- Flag Seal
- Nickname: City of Seven Lakes
- Anthem: Lungsod Naming Mahal (Our Beloved City)
- Map of Laguna, Batangas with San Pablo highlighted
- Interactive map of San Pablo
- Coordinates: 14°04′12″N 121°19′30″E
- Country: Philippines
- Region: Calabarzon
- Province: Laguna, Batangas
- District: 3rd district
- Founded: 1586
- Chartered: 1647
- Cityhood: May 7, 1940
- Named for: St. Paul the First Hermit
- Barangays: 80 (see Barangays)

Government
  - Type: Sangguniang Panlungsod
  - Mayor: Arcadio B. Gapangada Jr. (RP) (Note: Suspended until January 14, 2027); Carmela A. Acebedo (Nacionalista) (Note: Acting)
  - Vice Mayor: Justin G. Colago (Nacionalista) (Note: Suspended until January 22, 2027); Shaira Aliyah A. Diaz (Nacionalista)
  - Representative: Loreto Amante (PFP)
  - City Council: Members: Carmela A. Acebedo; Shaira Aliyah A. Diaz; Martin Angelo B. Adriano Jr.; John Edgar C. Adajar; Leonardo C. Villanueva; Syra A. Medina; Richard C. Pavico; Lou Vincent B. Amante; Cesarito C. Ticzon; Francis A. Calatrba
  - Electorate: 169,231 voters (2025)

Area
  - Total: 197.56 km^{2} (76.28 sq mi)
- Elevation: 237 m (778 ft)
- Highest elevation: 2,173 m (7,129 ft)
- Lowest elevation: 2 m (6.6 ft)

Population (2024 census)
  - Total: 300,166
  - Density: 1,519.4/km^{2} (3,935.1/sq mi)
  - Households: 70,979
- Demonym: San Pableño (f. -a) San Pablenyo (f. -a)

Economy
  - Income class: 1st city income class
  - Poverty incidence: 9.07% (2023)
  - Revenue: ₱ 1,942 million (2024)
  - Assets: ₱ 5,043 million (2024)
  - Expenditure: ₱ 712 million (2024)
  - Liabilities: ₱ 1,200 million (2024)

Service provider
  - Electricity: Manila Electric Company (Meralco)
- Time zone: UTC+8 (PST)
- ZIP code: 4000
- PSGC: 0403424000
- IDD : area code: +63 (0)49
- Native languages: Tagalog

San Pablo, officially the City of San Pablo (Filipino: Lungsod ng San Pablo), is a component city in the province of Laguna, Philippines. According to the 2024 census, it has a population of 300,166 people.

The city is also known as the "City of Seven Lakes" (Filipino: Lungsod ng Pitong Lawa), referring to the Seven Lakes of San Pablo: Lake Sampaloc (or Sampalok), Lake Palakpakin, Lake Bunot, Lakes Pandin and Yambo, Lake Muhikap, and Lake Calibato.

San Pablo was part of the Roman Catholic Archdiocese of Lipa beginning in 1910. On November 28, 1967, it became an independent diocese and became the Roman Catholic Diocese of San Pablo.

== Etymology ==
San Pablo derives its name from the Spanish for Saint Paul, referring to the local patron saint, Paul the First Hermit. It was previously known as San Pablo de los Montes, which translates to "Saint Paul of the Mountains" in Spanish.

== History ==
San Pablo's earliest historical record dates back to pre-Spanish times when four large barrios bounded by Mount Makiling composed of settlements, the most prominent of which was "Sampalok" (Sampaloc). In 1571, the first Spanish troops under Captain Juan de Salcedo arrived in the upland village of Sampaloc. It was noted by Father Joaquin Martinez de Zuñiga that its original inhabitants were Aetas and were ruled by four chieftains.

San Pablo became a parish in 1586, and then a municipality in 1647, and was renamed "San Pablo de los Montes" in honor of Saint Paul the First Hermit.

Augustinian friar, Father Hernando Cabrera built the first church made of wood. It was noted that the sacristy of this church was ornamented and contained silver, which rivalled and even surpassed that of Spain.

In 1756, it was placed under the jurisdiction of Batangas province but was returned to Laguna in 1883. The 1818 Spanish census recorded there to be 1,948 native families living in harmony with 7 Spanish-Filipino families.

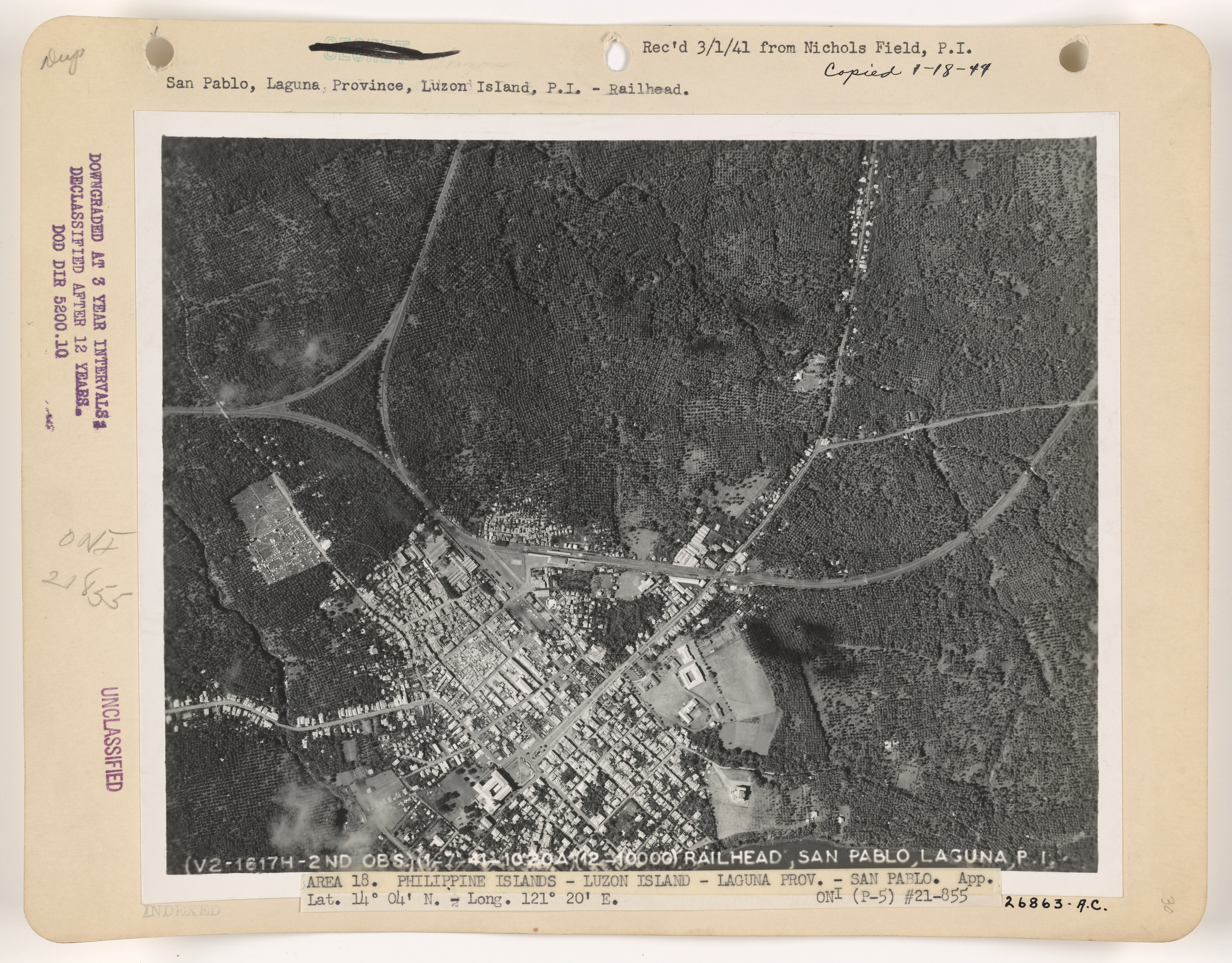
Aerial view of San Pablo, 1941

In 1899, a municipal government was established, with Atty. Innocente Martinez as municipal president. Marcos Paulino was elected municipal president in 1902 when the civil government was set up. From 1926 to 1940, the people of San Pablo worked for its independence from the province of Laguna.

On May 7, 1940, the Charter Bill sponsored by Assemblyman Tomas D. Dizon of Laguna's 1st district was approved by President Manuel L. Quezon. The bill became known as the City Charter of San Pablo or Commonwealth Act No. 520, approved by President Quezon.

The city was inaugurated on March 30, 1941, with Potenciano Malvar, a former governor of Laguna, as the city mayor appointed by president Manuel L. Quezon. Succeeding him in 1941 as an appointed mayor was Manuel Quisumbing, in turn followed by Tomas D. Dizon in 1943 as an appointed mayor. The succeeding mayors were elected after 1955, with Cipriano B. Colago being the first elected city mayor.

== Geography ==
San Pablo is located in the southern portion of Laguna province, 82 kilometers (51 mi) southeast of Manila via Alaminos and 37 kilometers (23 mi) southwest of Santa Cruz via Calauan.

By land area, it is the largest in Laguna province; by population, it is the sixth largest, after the cities of Calamba, Santa Rosa, Biñan, San Pedro, and Cabuyao.

San Pablo has a cool climate owing to its location. It is located in the foothills of three mountains: Mount Banahaw, Mount Makiling and the Sierra Madre Mountains within the Laguna Volcanic Field, also known as the San Pablo Volcanic Field.

The climate and soil are suitable for agriculture. The different barangays have plantations for coconuts, lanzones fruit (Lansium parasiticum), and rambutan fruit.

=== Climate ===
The prevailing climatic conditions in the city is categorized into wet and dry seasons.

Climate data for San Pablo City, Laguna
Month	Jan	Feb	Mar	Apr	May	Jun	Jul	Aug	Sep	Oct	Nov	Dec	Year
Mean daily maximum °F	79	81	84	88	88	86	84	82	82	82	82	79	83
Mean daily minimum °F	68	68	68	70	73	75	73	73	73	72	72	70	71
Average precipitation inches	2.0	1.4	1.1	1.1	3.2	4.9	6.4	5.7	5.7	5.6	3.9	4.0	45
Mean daily maximum °C	26	27	29	31	31	30	29	28	28	28	28	26	28
Mean daily minimum °C	20	20	20	21	23	24	23	23	23	22	22	21	22
Average precipitation mm	52	35	27	27	82	124	163	144	145	141	100	102	1,142
Average rainy days	12.0	8.1	8.8	9.7	17.9	22.6	26.2	24.5	24.6	22.0	16.7	14.9	208
Source: Meteoblue (modeled/calculated data, not measured locally)

=== Barangays ===
San Pablo is politically subdivided into 80 barangays, as indicated below. Each barangay consists of puroks and some have sitios.

PSGC	Barangay	Population			±% p.a.	
		2024		2010		
0403424001	Atisan	0.4%	1,271	1,225	▴	0.26%
0403424002	Bagong Bayan II-A	2.2%	6,471	5,639	▴	0.96%
0403424003	Bagong Pook VI-C	0.6%	1,859	1,921	▾	−0.23%
0403424004	Barangay I-A	0.2%	577	546	▴	0.38%
0403424005	Barangay I-B	1.3%	4,002	4,710	▾	−1.12%
0403424006	Barangay II-A	1.0%	2,896	2,697	▴	0.49%
0403424007	Barangay II-B	0.6%	1,853	2,503	▾	−2.06%
0403424008	Barangay II-C	0.4%	1,056	1,317	▾	−1.52%
0403424009	Barangay II-D	0.3%	979	1,332	▾	−2.11%
0403424010	Barangay II-E	0.7%	2,148	3,634	▾	−3.57%
0403424011	Barangay II-F	0.7%	2,185	2,244	▾	−0.18%
0403424012	Barangay III-A	0.1%	217	158	▴	2.22%
0403424013	Barangay III-B	0.3%	891	1,104	▾	−1.47%
0403424014	Barangay III-C	0.9%	2,773	3,169	▾	−0.92%
0403424015	Barangay III-D	0.4%	1,231	1,269	▾	−0.21%
0403424016	Barangay III-E	0.2%	591	545	▴	0.56%
0403424017	Barangay III-F	0.1%	213	225	▾	−0.38%
0403424018	Barangay IV-A	0.2%	720	794	▾	−0.67%
0403424019	Barangay IV-B	0.1%	415	533	▾	−1.72%
0403424020	Barangay IV-C	0.2%	584	850	▾	−2.56%
0403424021	Barangay V-A	0.2%	461	530	▾	−0.96%
0403424022	Barangay V-B	0.3%	845	1,234	▾	−2.59%
0403424023	Barangay V-C	0.1%	313	417	▾	−1.97%
0403424024	Barangay V-D	0.1%	269	407	▾	−2.83%
0403424025	Barangay VI-A	0.2%	529	476	▴	0.73%
0403424026	Barangay VI-B	0.3%	880	811	▴	0.57%
0403424027	Barangay VI-D	0.5%	1,531	1,968	▾	−1.72%
0403424028	Barangay VI-E	0.9%	2,617	2,898	▾	−0.70%
0403424029	Barangay VII-A	0.5%	1,432	1,709	▾	−1.22%
0403424030	Barangay VII-B	0.2%	620	629	▾	−0.10%
0403424031	Barangay VII-C	0.0%	85	65	▴	1.87%
0403424032	Barangay VII-D	0.0%	135	133	▴	0.10%
0403424033	Barangay VII-E	0.1%	177	127	▴	2.32%
0403424034	Bautista	1.1%	3,208	2,728	▴	1.13%
0403424035	Concepcion	2.8%	8,292	7,511	▴	0.69%
0403424036	Del Remedio	6.0%	17,871	14,197	▴	1.61%
0403424037	Dolores	0.8%	2,321	2,252	▴	0.21%
0403424038	San Antonio 1	2.0%	6,081	4,872	▴	1.55%
0403424039	San Antonio 2	1.6%	4,693	3,822	▴	1.43%
0403424040	San Bartolome	1.2%	3,572	3,447	▴	0.25%
0403424041	San Buenaventura	1.5%	4,396	3,635	▴	1.32%
0403424042	San Crispin	1.7%	5,067	3,422	▴	2.75%
0403424043	San Cristobal	1.9%	5,682	5,161	▴	0.67%
0403424044	San Diego	1.7%	5,068	5,179	▾	−0.15%
0403424045	San Francisco	5.0%	14,916	15,848	▾	−0.42%
0403424046	San Gabriel	3.0%	8,875	8,871	▴	0.00%
0403424047	San Gregorio	2.9%	8,720	5,621	▴	3.09%
0403424048	San Ignacio	2.0%	6,025	5,005	▴	1.29%
0403424049	San Isidro	1.4%	4,262	3,683	▴	1.02%
0403424050	San Joaquin	0.6%	1,670	1,629	▴	0.17%
0403424051	San Jose	3.6%	10,720	8,953	▴	1.25%
0403424052	San Juan	1.1%	3,356	3,569	▾	−0.42%
0403424053	San Lorenzo	0.6%	1,901	1,985	▾	−0.30%
0403424054	San Lucas 1	2.0%	6,127	5,985	▴	0.16%
0403424055	San Lucas 2	2.2%	6,474	5,634	▴	0.97%
0403424056	San Marcos	0.9%	2,756	3,004	▾	−0.59%
0403424057	San Mateo	1.0%	3,141	2,439	▴	1.77%
0403424058	San Miguel	1.2%	3,513	3,280	▴	0.48%
0403424059	San Nicolas	2.4%	7,255	4,872	▴	2.79%
0403424060	San Pedro	1.0%	3,120	2,779	▴	0.80%
0403424061	San Rafael	1.6%	4,672	3,698	▴	1.63%
0403424062	San Roque	1.1%	3,313	3,505	▾	−0.39%
0403424063	San Vicente	1.2%	3,505	3,508	▾	−0.01%
0403424064	Santa Ana	1.0%	2,926	2,715	▴	0.52%
0403424065	Santa Catalina	0.9%	2,553	2,501	▴	0.14%
0403424066	Santa Cruz	0.9%	2,823	2,444	▴	1.00%
0403424067	Santa Elena	1.5%	4,606	4,966	▾	−0.52%
0403424068	Santa Felomina	1.2%	3,567	3,448	▴	0.24%
0403424069	Santa Isabel	1.3%	3,830	3,436	▴	0.75%
0403424070	Santa Maria	1.3%	4,022	3,362	▴	1.25%
0403424071	Santa Maria Magdalena	0.9%	2,778	2,470	▴	0.82%
0403424072	Santa Monica	3.4%	10,088	7,943	▴	1.67%
0403424073	Santa Veronica	0.6%	1,920	1,708	▴	0.81%
0403424074	Santiago I	0.9%	2,739	2,315	▴	1.17%
0403424075	Santiago II	1.1%	3,445	3,218	▴	0.47%
0403424076	Santisimo Rosario	1.8%	5,397	4,676	▴	1.00%
0403424077	Santo Angel	2.9%	8,574	8,459	▴	0.09%
0403424078	Santo Cristo	1.1%	3,240	3,086	▴	0.34%
0403424079	Santo Niño	1.9%	5,682	5,158	▴	0.67%
0403424080	Soledad	1.3%	3,760	3,248	▴	1.02%
	Total		300,166	285,348	▴	0.35%

== Demographics ==
Population census of San Pablo
Year	Pop.	±% p.a.
1903	22,612	—
1918	31,399	+2.21%
1939	46,311	+1.87%
1948	50,435	+0.95%
1960	70,680	+2.85%
1970	105,517	+4.08%
1975	116,607	+2.02%
1980	131,655	+2.46%
1990	161,630	+2.07%
1995	183,757	+2.43%
2000	207,927	+2.68%
2007	237,259	+1.84%
2010	248,890	+1.76%
2015	266,068	+1.28%
2020	285,348	+1.48%
2024	300,166	+1.22%
Source: Philippine Statistics Authority

According to the 2024 census, San Pablo had a population of 300,166 people, up from 266,068 people in the 2015 census. The city was once the largest city in Laguna, but it was overtaken by Calamba in the 1990 census. San Pedro followed suit in 1995, then came Santa Rosa and Biñan in 2007, and Cabuyao in 2015, all owing their growth to its proximity to Metro Manila.

=== Ethnicity and language ===
The language spoken in the city and the medium of instruction in schools are English and Filipino, also known as Tagalog in this area.

== Economy ==
Poverty incidence of San Pablo (%)

Source: Philippine Statistics Authority

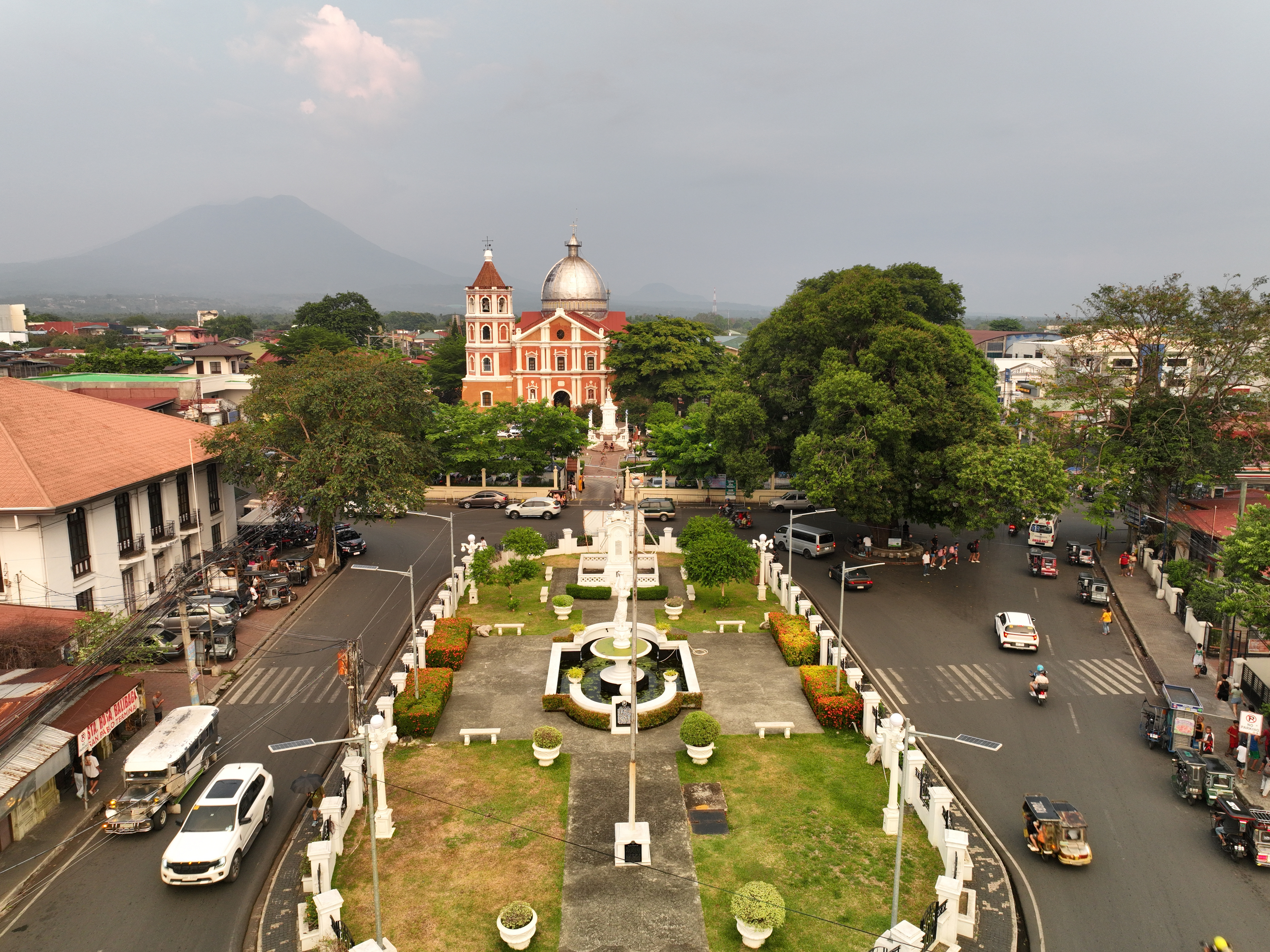
Downtown area

SM City San Pablo, the 2nd SM Supermall in Laguna

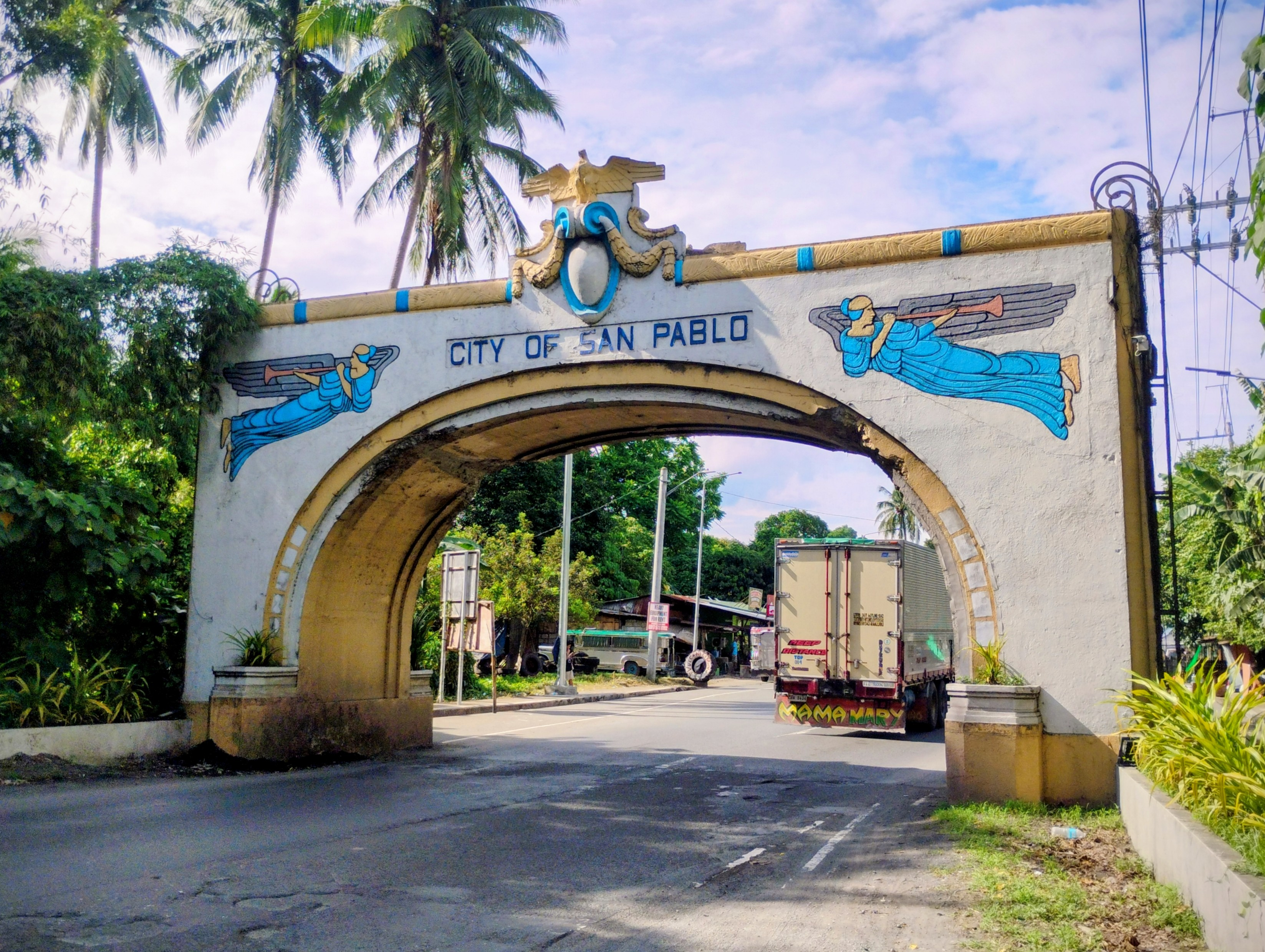
Laguna–Quezon Boundary Arch entering San Pablo

At the end of the 20th century and the start of the 21st century, economic development shifted from San Pablo to western Laguna. San Pedro, Biñan, Santa Rosa, Cabuyao, Calamba, Los Baños, and Santa Cruz experienced rapid economic development brought about by local and foreign investments, the rapid growth of industrial estates and export processing zones, and the placement of major institutions in those areas, San Pablo City was left behind and remained a semi-developed residential community.

Despite the fact that the city was partly touched by economic development, San Pablo boasts itself as a potential eco-tourism destination in the province. However, given its human and land resources, various BPO companies are seriously looking at developing the city into the ICT hub of Southern Luzon. Although there were previous attempts to build a similar establishment, SM Prime Holdings was given its go signal in July 2008 to push ahead for SM City San Pablo located at Riverina Commercial Estates along Maharlika Highway at Barangay San Rafael. Apart from this, the development of the Hacienda Escudero plantation resort town and nearby real estates, which is a joint venture with Landco, is by far the largest planned community investment in the city covering 415 hectares (1,030 acres): It will include resort type communities; the original Villa Escudero Plantations as the center-piece; commercial establishments like a mall, hotels, and a convention center to be built relative to the distinctive architecture theme of the original Villa Escudero. As such Hacienda Escudero will become the ultimate history town themed community in this part of the country.

ABS-CBN TV-46 San Pablo (DWLY-TV) served the city through its office along Rizal Avenue at the heart of the city until its operations was shut down in 2020.

San Pablo also claims the title "City of Buko Pie", although other neighboring towns are also known for producing the delicacy. Colettes' Buko Pie, based in San Pablo, was known for experimenting with different variants of the delicacy. Colette's has also regularly produced the "World's Largest Buko Pie" during San Pablo's Coco Festival. Colette's is the largest Buko Pie brand in the Laguna area with 34 stores. The supply of coconut in San Pablo makes it an ideal spot for putting up buko pie shops.

Franklin Baker Company, one of the well-known companies with operations in San Pablo, has announced that its plant in the city would cease its operations and transfer to another existing facility, owned by the said company, in Davao del Sur by December 2008. The said decision could affect the jobs of at least 1,200 people, the majority of them San Pableños. Various factors are blamed for this closure, including the conversion of big coconut farms into residential areas. However, production was restored in the first quarter of 2009 in the San Pablo plant of Franklin Baker Company due to processing problems encountered at Davao del Sur.

== Tourism and recreation ==
=== Natural Attractions ===
The Seven Lakes of San Pablo, seven crater lakes scattered around the city, have for many generations provided food and livelihood, leisure and respite for the citizens of the city. A bustling city of trade and commerce, it is also a center of education and learning with schools, colleges, and training institutions.

- Lake Sampaloc, located behind the City Hall, is the youngest crater lake in the San Pablo volcanic field and the largest of the Seven Lakes of San Pablo.
- Lake Bunot
- Lake Calibato
- Twin Lakes – Lakes Pandin and Yambo
- Lake Palakpakin
- Lake Muhikap

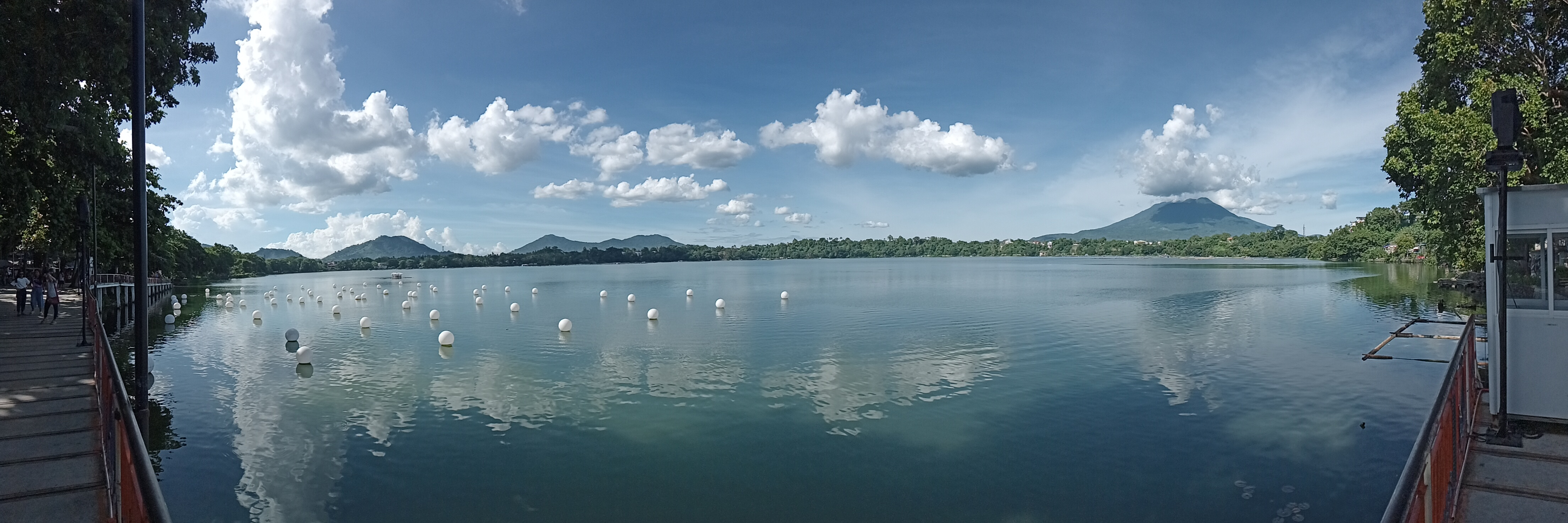
Panoramic view of Lake Sampaloc

=== Built attractions ===
- Hacienda Escudero Plantation Resort Town is the largest planned community investment in the city covering 415 hectares (1,030 acres). The resort has the richness of coconut plantation, and provides serenading Filipino songs and Bayanihan Dances (Folk Dances).
- Public Playground at Sampalok Lake (Katuparan ng Pangarap: Fulfillment of Dreams) is a public playground in the city built during the term of mayor Atty. Zacarias Africa Ticzon, who as well improved tourism places around Lake Sampaloc, that is near the municipal City Hall. Both places serve as haven for sports, and recreation. The vicinity for tourism consequently encouraged small businesses for restaurants of native dishes catering visitors of the area. It has dramatically contributed income for the city.
- The Komikero Komiks Museum, a brick-and-mortar museum meant to showcase the Philippines' rich history of graphic novels and comic books, and the talent of eminent artists in the field, features original art from Philippine comic book industry leaders including Alfredo Alcala, Francisco Coching, Alex Niño, Steve Gan, Nestor Redondo, Tony Velasquez, Hal Santiago, and Gerry Alanguilan. Alanguilan himself curated the museum until his death in 2019.
- San Pablo City Heritage Zone- a planned preservation of the city's historic Spanish and American occupation structures which contain among others:
  - Old City Hall- now the Museo San Pablo
  - Fule-Malvar Mansion
  - DepEd Library Hub
  - Prudencia Fule Ancestral House and Elementary School
  - San Pablo City Central School
  - Hagdang Bato

=== Cultural Events ===
- Coco Festival - A week long event in honor of town patron St. Paul the First Hermit
- Tilapia Festival- held every May, this is in tribute to the aquaculture industry of the city
- Semana Santa- a week long observance for Catholics and Aglipayans. The city hosts one of the largest displays of faith in the country, most especially during the Holy Wednesday and Good Friday processions
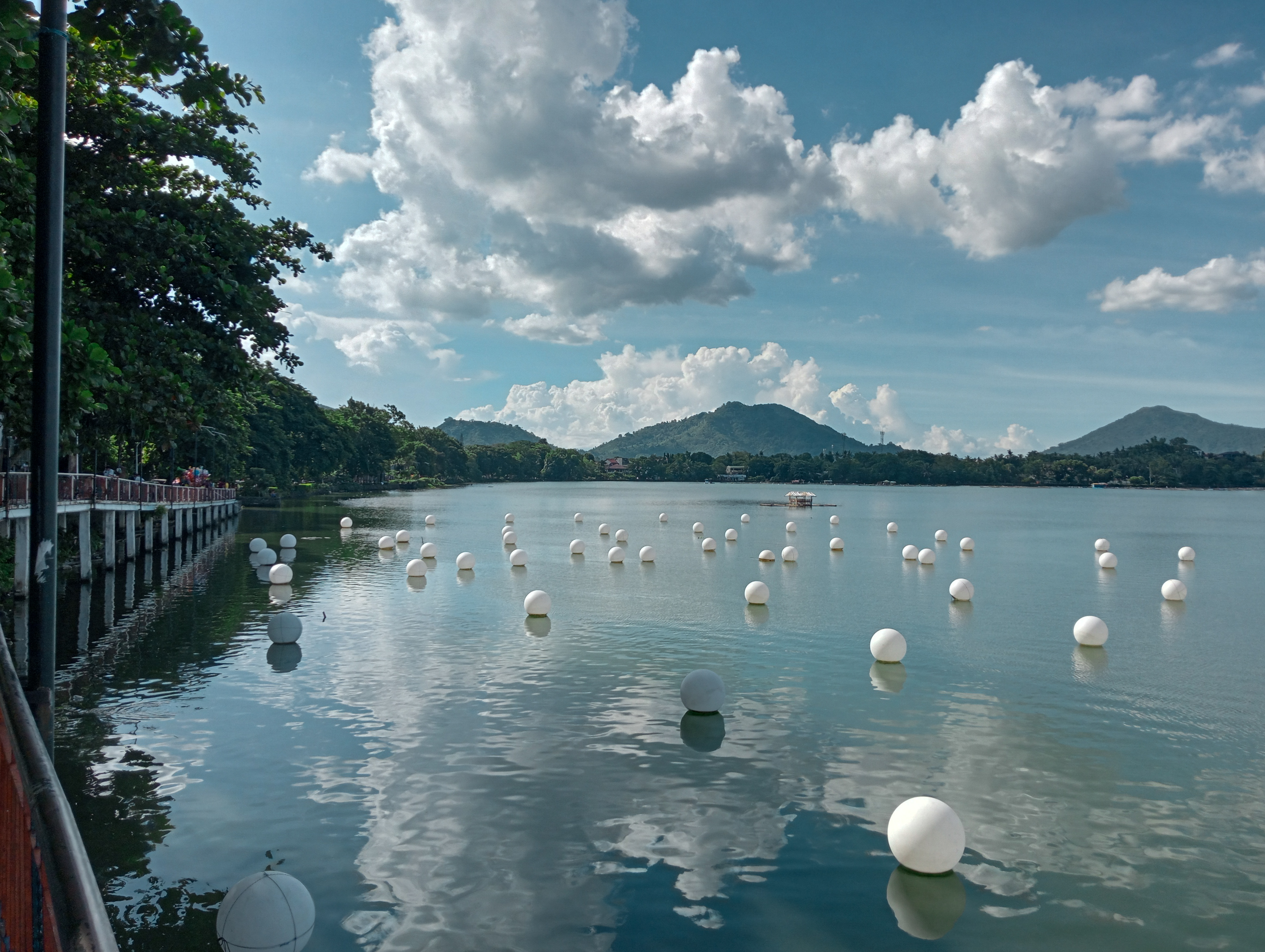
Lake Sampaloc

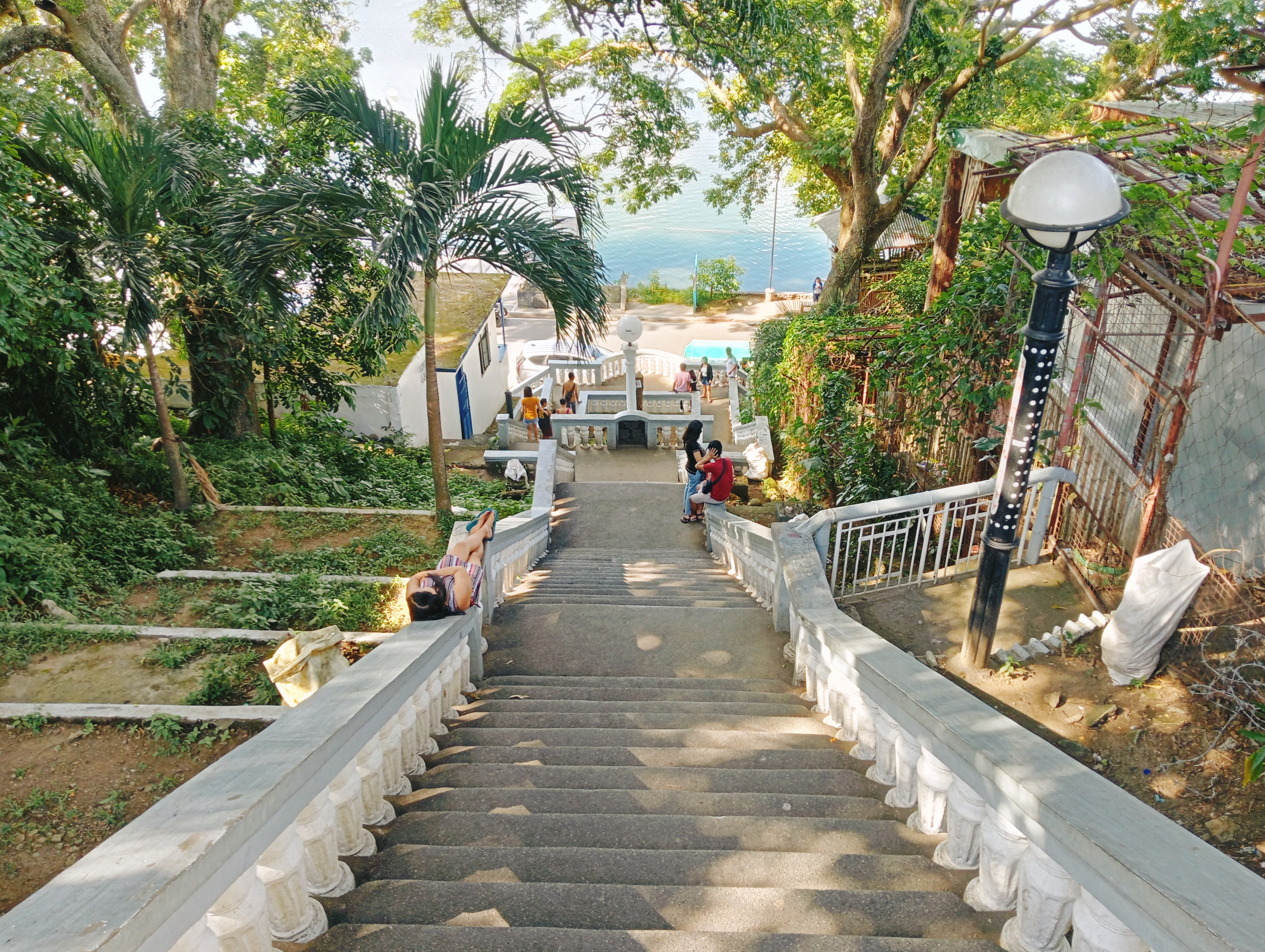
Hagdang Bato

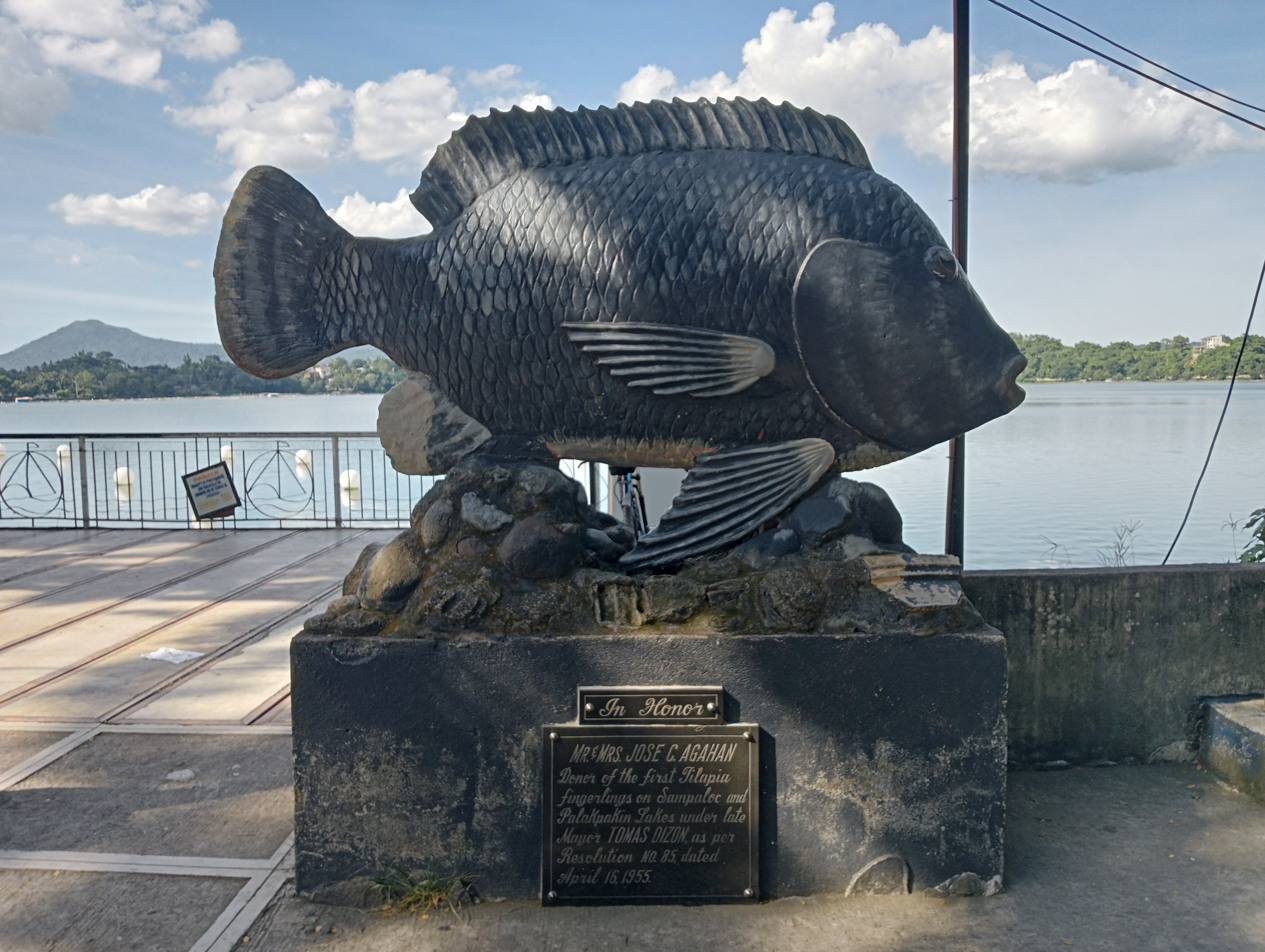
Tilapia Monument

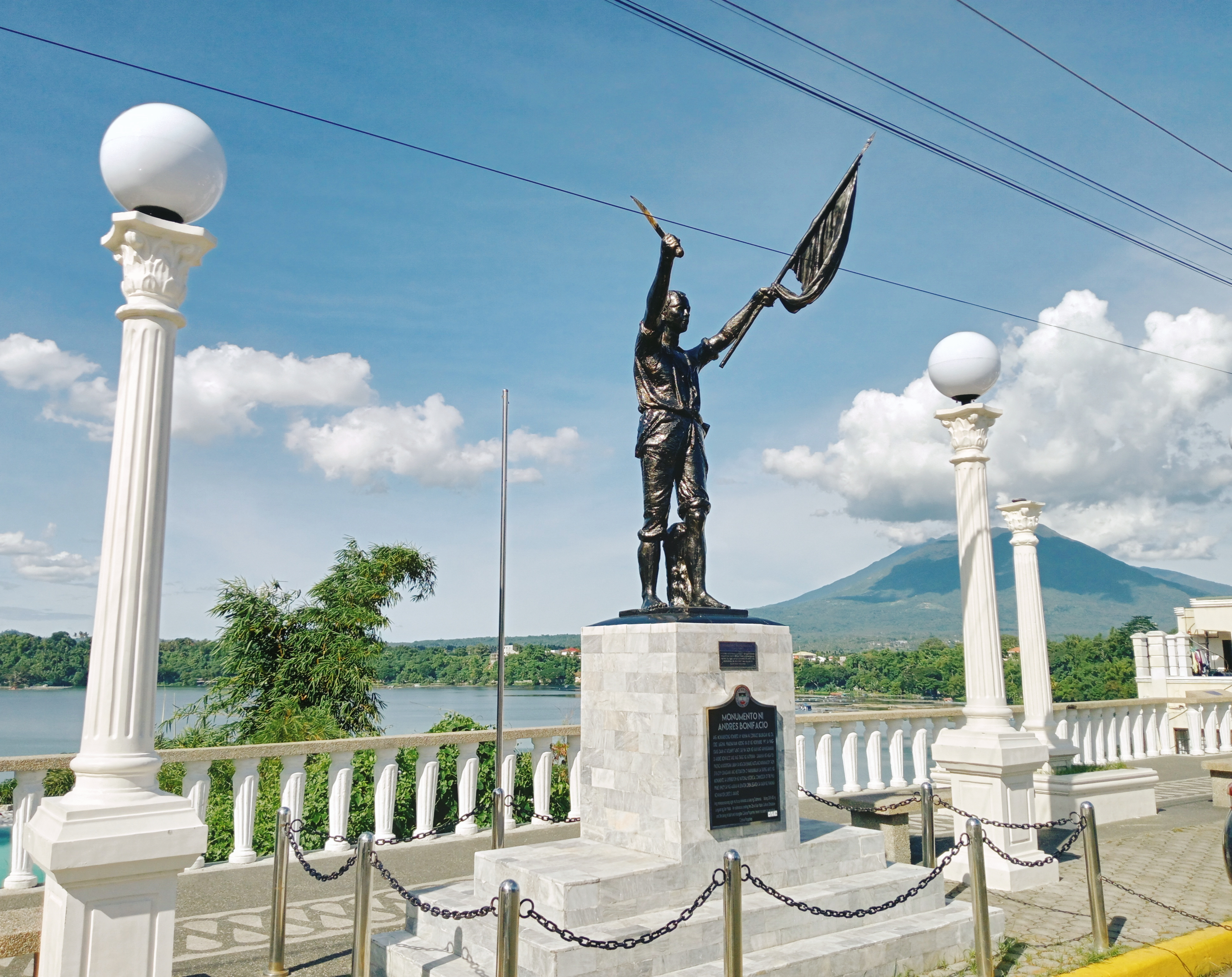
Andres Bonifacio Monument

== Government ==
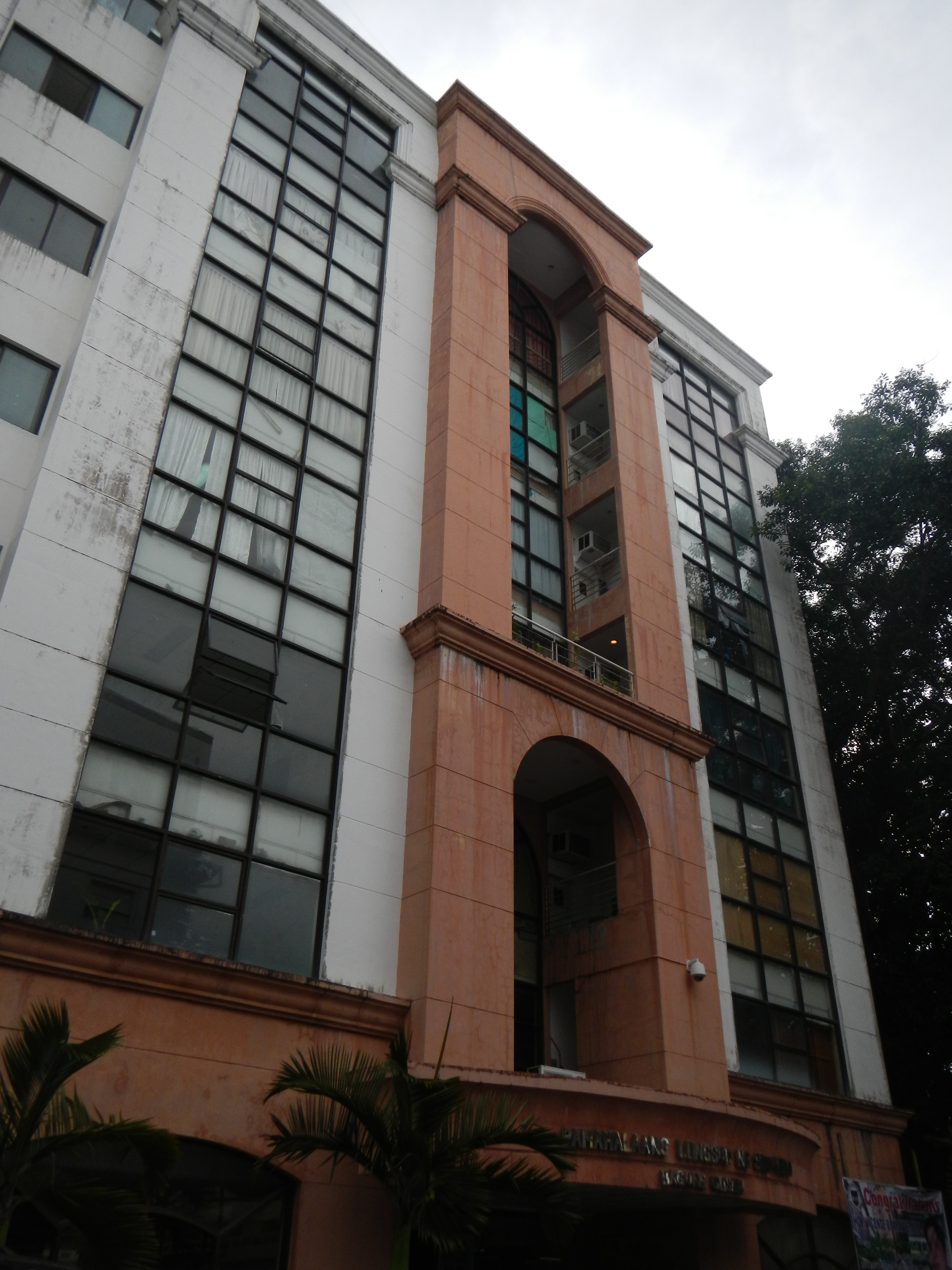
New City Hall of San Pablo

=== Elected officials ===
San Pablo City officials (2025–2028)
Name	Party
Mayor
Arcadio B. Gapangada Jr.	RP
Vice Mayor
Justin G. Colago	Nacionalista
Councilors
Carmela A. Acebedo	Nacionalista
Shaira Aliyah A. Diaz	Nacionalista
Martin Angelo B. Adriano Jr.	Nacionalista
John Edgar C. Adajar	NPC
Leonardo C. Villanueva	Independent
Syra A. Medina	Nacionalista
Richard C. Pavico	Nacionalista
Lou Vincent B. Amante	Nacionalista
Cesarito C. Ticzon	Nacionalista
Francis A. Calatraba	Nacionalista
Ex Officio City Council Members
ABC President	Ariston A. Amante (San Jose)
SK President	Eldrich Khristoffer B. Villanueva (II-B Guadalupe)

Due to the six-month suspensions of Mayor Arcadio Gapangada Jr. and Vice Mayor Justin Colago beginning in July 2026 following lawsuits filed against each other, Carmela Acebedo and Shaira Aliyah Diaz assumed the roles of acting mayor and acting vice mayor, respectively.

=== List of former municipal executives ===
==== Appointed ====
No.	Name	Year Started	Year Ended
a	Bartolome Maghayon	1647	First Governadorcillo
1	Domingo Ticzon M.D.	1771	1773
2	Florante dumon Ticzon	1774	1859
3	Engr. Juan Ticzon	1860	1864
4	Unknown	1865	1877
5	Atty. Zacarias Sarmiento Ticzon	1878	1879
6	Selso Sr. Ticzon	1880	1890
7	Teodoro Sarmiento Ticzon	1891	1894
8	Cristeto Emralino Ticzon	1895	1898
9	Atty. Innocente Ticzon	1899	1901 Mayor
10	Marcial Alimario Sr.	1916	Municipal President
11	Dr. Potenciano Malvar	1941	Governor of Laguna
12	Dr. Manuel Quisumbing	1941	Municipal President
13	Tomas D. Dizon	1943	
14	Atty. Alfonso P. Farcon	1944	
15	Dr. Fernando A. Bautista	1946	1949
16	Marciano E. Brion, Sr.	1949	1952
17	Artemio B. Fule	1952	1953
18	Tomas D. Dizon	1954	1955

==== Elected ====
No.	Name	Year Started	Year Ended
1	Marcos Paulino	1902	1906
2	Inocencio Barleta	1926	1940
3	Cipriano B. Colago	1955	1959
4	Lauro Dizon	1960	1963
5	Atty. Zacarias Africa Ticzon	1964	1967
6	Cesar P. Dizon	1968	1986
7	Atty. Zacarias Africa Ticzon	1986	1992
8	Vicente B. Amante	1992	2001
9	Florante L. Aquino	2001	2004
10	Vicente B. Amante	2004	2013
11	Loreto Amante	2013	2022
12	Vicente B. Amante	2022	2025
13	Arcadio B. Gapangada Jr.	2025	present

== Infrastructure ==
=== Healthcare ===
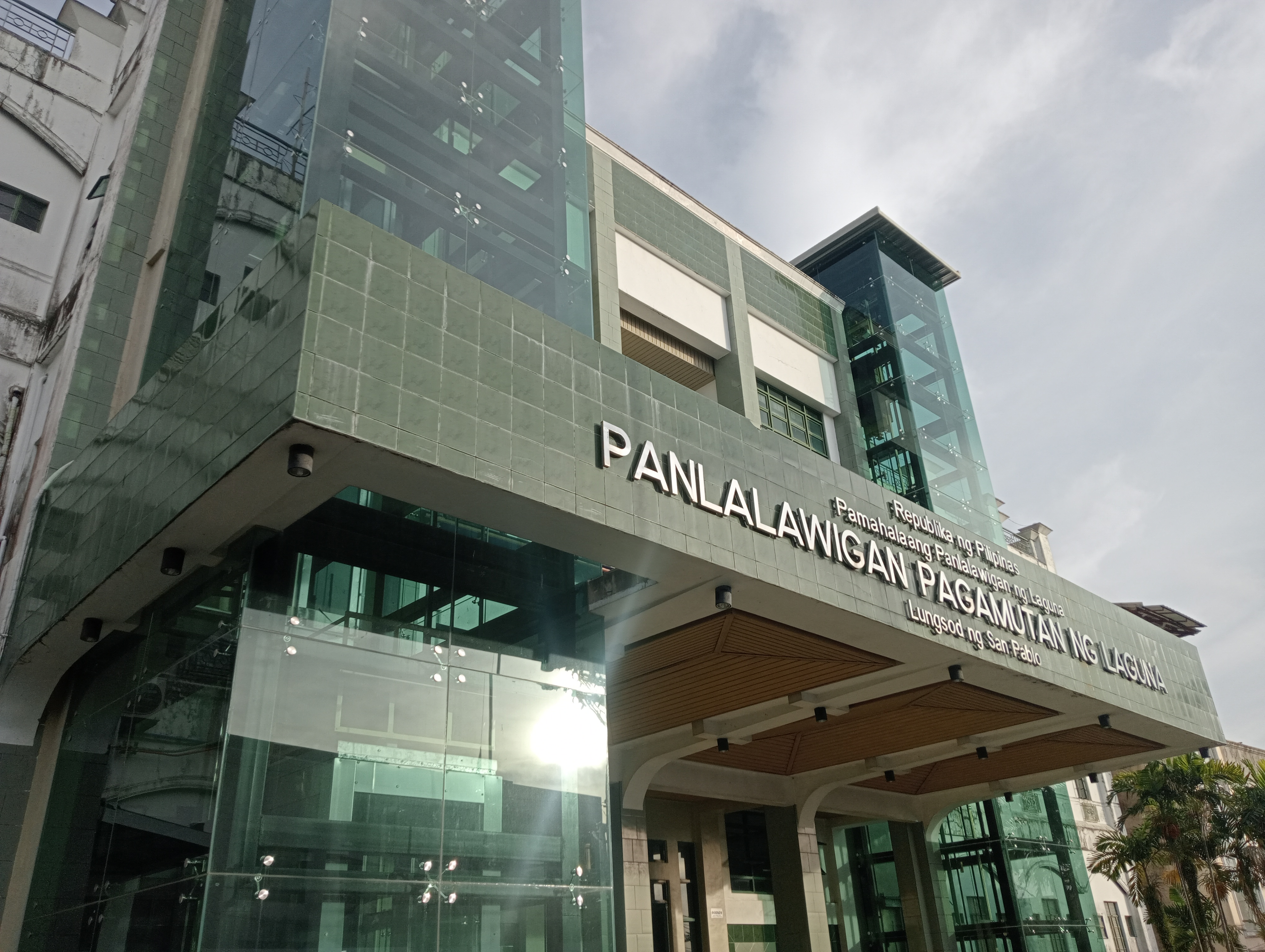
San Pablo City District Hospital

Most of the large hospitals in San Pablo are located in the city proper, but there are also health centers built for each barangay in San Pablo.

Notable hospitals and medical centers are as follows:

- Community General Hospital of San Pablo City
- San Pablo Colleges Medical Center
- San Pablo City Doctors' Hospital
- San Pablo City General Hospital
- San Pablo City District Hospital
- Sts Francis and Paul General Hospital

=== Transportation ===
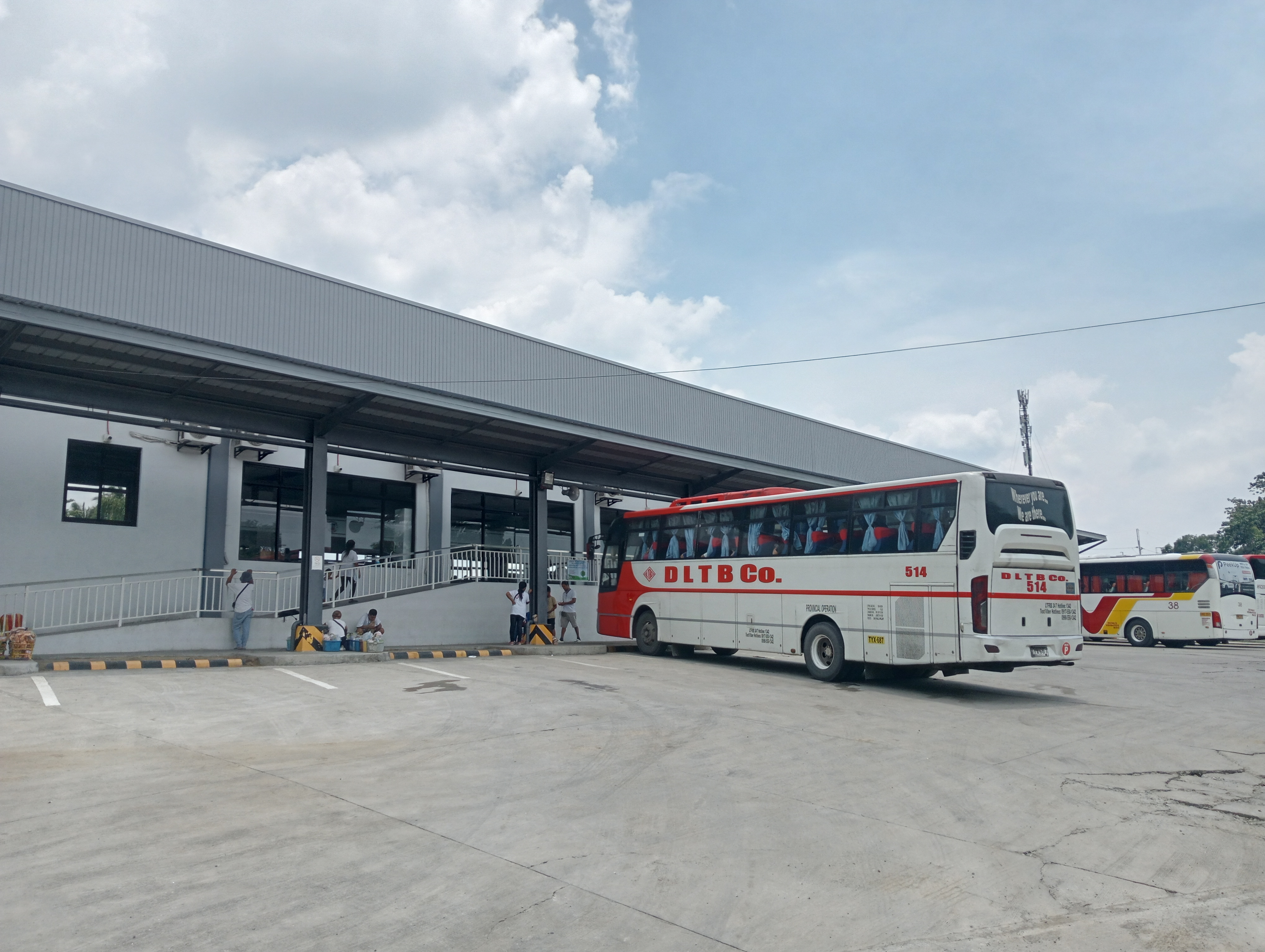
San Pablo City Central Terminal

San Pablo city is along the Maharlika Highway which leads to Quezon province. Jeepneys connect San Pablo city proper with nearby Calauan and Rizal, as well as other cities like Tanauan, Santo Tomas, and Calamba. It is also served by vans heading to the cities of Lipa, Santa Rosa, and Biñan.

Philippine National Railways has a station for its southern main line near the city proper.

The San Pablo City Central Terminal, opened in 2023, is the city's main bus terminal that serves commuters going to Metro Manila, as well as other provincial destinations.

=== Utilities ===
San Pablo's water source is run by its own San Pablo City Water District and is assisted by NAWASA. San Pablo's electricity is run by Meralco.

=== Telecommunications ===
Citizens of San Pablo mainly use PLDT (including Smart), Globe, and Dito Telecommunity, although some may use other internet service providers. Texting stations are often found in retail stores, stands, and residential houses.

=== Major Houses of Worship ===
- Saint Paul the First Hermit Cathedral- Headquarters of the Roman Catholic Diocese of San Pablo and Seat of the Roman Catholic Bishop of San Pablo which oversees catholic churches in Laguna.
- IFI Parish of Saint Paul the First Hermit
- Iglesia Unida Ekumenikal
- Iglesia ni Cristo- Lokal ng San Pablo
- Sat Kartar Indian Sikh Temple

=== Education ===
==== Primary and Secondary ====
The city's first educational institution was the Escuela Pía, administered by the Jesuits, which taught the fundamentals of arithmetic, reading, and writing, primarily serving the local elite. This school was lost in the Great Fire of San Pablo in 1938, which decimated a large portion of the town. Today, the site is occupied by the San Pablo Puericulture Center and the Chapter Headquarters of the Philippine Red Cross.

Public education initiatives began during the American period, leading to the establishment of the San Pablo Elementary School (now San Pablo Central School). Its first building was erected in 1916 under the Gabaldon Act, which funded the creation of similar public schools throughout the city.

Secondary education was introduced with the founding of the Laguna Academy (now Laguna College) in 1923. Public secondary schooling arrived much later with the creation of the San Pablo High School (now San Pablo City Integrated High School) in 1969.

Basic education schools in the city are overseen by the Schools Division office of San Pablo City .

==== Tertiary ====
San Pablo City offers a range of higher education options, anchored by the Laguna State Polytechnic University- San Pablo City Campus, which serves as the city's only state university. Tertiary institutions also include the city-operated Dalubhasaan ng Lungsod ng San Pablo, the religious institution St. Peter's College Seminary, and numerous private colleges and vocational schools.

- Laguna Colleges
- Canossa Colleges
- San Pablo Colleges

== Notable personalities ==
=== Politics ===
- Vicente Belen Amante, former city mayor
- Sol Aragones, former journalist, 3rd District Representative and Governor of Laguna
- Cynthia Barker, English politician and former mayor of Hertsmere, England
- Alexander Gesmundo, 27th Chief Justice of the Supreme Court of the Philippines
- Arturo Brion, 161st Associate Justice of the Supreme Court
- Liza Maza, activist, former Gabriela Partylist and Bayan Muna Partylist Representative
- Victor Corpus – military officer and public official
- Angelica Jones, Actress-comedianne, 3rd district board member of Laguna
- Orlan Calayag, Former mayor of Dolores, Quezon Province, Former administrator of the National Food Authority (NFA)

=== Business ===
- Jaime Aristotle Alip, Businessman, Founder of CARD Mutually Reinforcing Institutions
- Antonio C. Delgado, industrialist and civic leader, Philippine ambassador to the Vatican

=== Entertainment, Journalism, Literature & Arts ===
- Patis Tesoro – National Artist of the Philippines for Fashion Design
- Bayani Casimiro Sr., bodabil performer dubbed the "Fred Astaire of the Philippines"
- Celso Al. Carunungan, writer, novelist, and film scriptwriter
- HaveYouSeenThisGirL, author-novelist of Diary ng Panget
- Gerry Alanguilan, a.k.a. "Komikero," comic book artist and writer best known for his graphic novels Wasted and Elmer
- Edgar Calabia Samar, poet and fictionist
- Jay Arcilla, actor and StarStruck Avenger in the 5th season of StarStruck
- Jiggy Manicad, television news producer/reporter and newscaster
- Roberta Angela Tamondong, model, beauty pageant titleholder, Miss Eco Teen International 2020, and Binibining Pilipinas Grand International 2022
- Jojo Acuin, celebrity psychic dubbed "Nostradamus of Asia and the Pacific"
- Erlinda Cortes, Postwar actress
- Azenith Briones, actress

=== Sports ===
- Erik Spoelstra, American basketball coach
- Lizza Danila, Filipina swimmer who represented the Philippines at the 2000 Sydney Olympics
- Dennice Villamor, professional basketball player for Caloocan Batang Kankaloo of the Maharlika Pilipinas Basketball League (MPBL)

=== Others ===
- Flor Ramos Contemplacion, Filipina domestic helper executed in Singapore after being convicted of murder.
