= Communes of Mayotte =

Map of the communes of Mayotte

The French overseas department of Mayotte is divided into 17 communes.

Most are located on the island of Grande Terre, except for Dzaoudzi and Pamandzi which are located on Petite Terre.

The communes cooperate in the following intercommunalities (as of 2025):

- Communauté d'agglomération de Dembeni-Mamoudzou
- Communauté d'agglomération du Grand Nord de Mayotte
- Communauté de communes du Centre-Ouest
- Communauté de communes de Petite-Terre
- Communauté de communes du Sud

== List of communes ==
List of the 17 communes of Mayotte on 1 January 2021
Commune	Code INSEE	Postal Code	Canton	Intercommunality	Area (km^{2})	Population (2017)	Density (per km^{2})
Acoua	97601	97630	Mtsamboro	CA du Grand Nord de Mayotte	13.11	5,192	396
Bandraboua	97602	97650	Bandraboua & Mtsamboro	CA du Grand Nord de Mayotte	32.11	13,989	436
Bandrele	97603	97660	Bouéni & Dembeni	CC du Sud (Mayotte)	36.56	10,282	281
Bouéni	97604	97620	Bouéni	CC du Sud (Mayotte)	14.06	6,189	169
Chiconi	97605	97670	Ouangani	CC du Centre-Ouest	8.26	8,295	1,004
Chirongui	97606	97620	Sada	CC du Sud (Mayotte)	28.76	8,920	310
Dembeni	97607	97660	Dembeni	CA de Dembeni-Mamoudzou	38.38	15,848	413
Dzaoudzi (prefecture)	97608	97615	Dzaoudzi	CC de Petite-Terre	7.87	17,831	2,266
Kani-Kéli	97609	97625	Bouéni	CC du Sud (Mayotte)	20.59	5,507	267
Koungou	97610	97600	Bandraboua & Koungou	CA du Grand Nord de Mayotte	28.41	32,156	1,132
Mamoudzou	97611	97600 97650 97605 97680	Mamoudzou-1, Mamoudzou-2 & Mamoudzou-3	CA de Dembeni-Mamoudzou	42.30	71,437	1,689
Mtsamboro	97612	97630	Mtsamboro	CA du Grand Nord de Mayotte	16.41	7,705	470
M'Tsangamouji	97613	97650	Tsingoni	CC du Centre-Ouest	21.84	6,432	295
Ouangani	97614	97670	Ouangani	CC du Centre-Ouest	19.05	10,203	536
Pamandzi	97615	97615	Pamandzi	CC de Petite-Terre	4.24	11,442	2,699
Sada	97616	97640	Sada	CC du Centre-Ouest	10.26	11,156	1,087
Tsingoni	97617	97680	Tsingoni	CC du Centre-Ouest	34.42	13,934	405
Mayotte	976	-	-	-	376	256,518	682

== Detailed communal breakdown of population ==
Same communes, classified by decreasing population (Mayotte counted 160,506 inhabitants in total in 2002, for an average population density of 430.0 inhabitants/km^{2}, more than four times the national average). The average or mean population of the communes is 9,441 inhabitants, while the median population is 6,963 inhabitants, much higher than the average and median population of Metropolitan France (1,542 and 380 inhabitants respectively). Each commune generally consists of several villages.

	Name	Population (2002 INSEE)	Area (km^{2})	Density (inhabitants/km^{2})
1	Mamoudzou	45,646	41.94	1,088
	Mtsapere	10,495
	Kaweni	9,604
	Mamoudzou	6,533
	Passamainty	6,008
	Kavani	5,488
	Vahibé	3,236
	Tsountsou1	3,058
	Tsountsou2	1,053
2	Koungou	15,383	28.41	541
	Majicavo Koropa	5,828
	Koungou	5,467
	Longoni	1,497
	Trévani	1,161
	Majicavo Lamir	774
	Kangani	656
3	Dzaoudzi	12,311	6.66	1 848
	Labattoir	12,066
	Dzaoudzi	242
4	Tsingoni	7,856	34.76	226
	Combani	3,559
	Tsingoni	2,116
	Mirereni	1,722
	Mroualé	382
5	Dembeni	7,825	38.8	202
	Tsararano	2,181
	Dembeni	1,943
	Iloni	1,608
	Ajangoua	1,183
	Ongojou	910
6	Pamandzi	7,510	4.29	1,751
7	Bandraboua	7,501	32.37	232
	Dzoumogne	2,517
	Bandraboua	1,866
	Handrema	1,343
	Bouyouni	978
	Mtsangamboua	797
8	Mtsamboro	7,068	13.71	516
	Mtsamboro	3,071
	Mtsahara	2,370
	Hamjago	1,627
9	Sada	6,963	11.16	624
	Sada	9,176
	Manjagou	787
10	Chiconi	6,167	8.29	744
	Chiconi	5,060
	Sohoa	1,107
11	Chirongui	5,696	28.31	201
	Poroani	1,780
	Chirongui	1,158
	Tsimkoura	1,035
	Miréréni	721
	Mramadoudou	587
	Malamani	415
12	Ouangani	5,569	19.05	292
	Barakani	2,360
	Ouangani	2,096
	Kahani	953
	Coconi	160
13	Bandrele	5,537	36.46	152
	Bandrele	2,124
	M'tsamoudou	1,395
	Nyambadao	813
	Dapani	568
	Bambo Est	353
	Hamouro	284
14	M'Tsangamouji	5,382	21.84	246
	M'Tsangamouji	4,002
	Chembenyouba	1,072
	Mliha	308
15	Bouéni	5,151	14.06	366
	Bouéni	4,002
	Mzouazia	954
	Moinatrindri	813
	Hagnoundrou	766
	Bambo Ouest	338
	Mbouanatsa	189
16	Acoua	4,605	12.62	365
	Acoua	3,285
	Mtsangadoua	1,320
17	Kani-Kéli	4,336	20.51	211
	Kani-Kéli	1,708
	Kanibé	693
	Choungui	658
	Mronabeja	455
	Mbouini	415
	Passy-Kéli	407

== See also ==
- List of cities in Mayotte
- Islands of Mayotte
- Administrative divisions of France
- Lists of communes of France
