= List of cities in Mayotte =

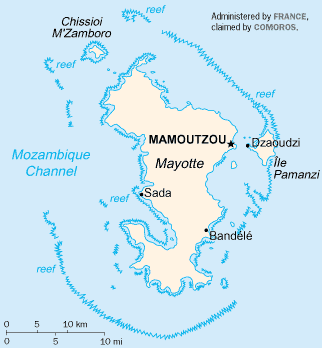
Map of Mayotte

The following is a list of cities in Mayotte:

- Acoua
- Bandraboua
- Bandrele
- Bouéni
- Chiconi
- Chirongui
- Dembéni
- Dzaoudzi
- Kani-Kéli
- Koungou
- Mamoudzou
- Mtsamboro
- M'Tsangamouji
- Ouangani
- Pamandzi
- Sada
- Tsingoni

== See also ==
- Communes of Mayotte
- Islands of Mayotte
