= List of Mayotte-related topics =

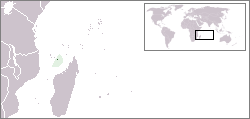
Location of Mayotte

This is a partial list of topics related to Mayotte.

== Geography ==
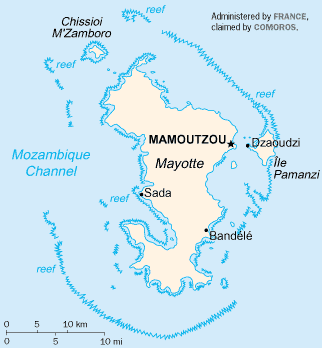

=== Landforms ===
- Islands of Mayotte
- Pamanzi (second-largest island of Mayotte)

== History ==
- Elections in Mayotte
  - 2004 Mahoran legislative election
  - 2008 Mahoran legislative election
  - 2009 Mahoran status referendum
- Postage stamps and postal history of Mayotte

== Government and politics ==
- Elections in Mayotte
- General Council of Mayotte

=== Administrative divisions ===
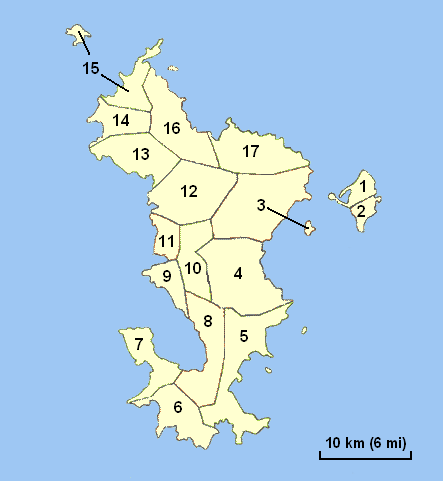
Mayotte is divided into 17 communes.

- Acoua
- Bandraboua
- Bandrélé
- Bouéni
- Chiconi
- Chirongui
- Dembeni
- Dzaoudzi
- Kani-Kéli
- Koungou
- Mamoudzou
- Mtsamboro
- M'Tsangamouji
- Ouangani
- Pamandzi
- Sada, Mayotte
- Tsingoni

=== Political parties ===
- Force of the Rally and the Alliance for Democracy
- Mahoran Departmentalist Movement
- Mahoré People's Movement

=== Politicians ===
- Saïd Omar Oili

== Economy ==
- Communications in Mayotte
- Euro (official currency)
- .yt (Internet country code top-level domain)

=== Transport ===
==== Airports ====
- Dzaoudzi Pamandzi International Airport

== Demographics ==
=== Languages ===
- French language
- Shimaore language

=== Religion ===
- Islam in Mayotte

== Culture ==
=== National symbols ===
Mayotte has no official national flag of its own and uses the flag of France. The unofficial local flag (depicted) consists of a white field with the archipelago's coat of arms below an inscription "MAYOTTE" in red capitals.

- Coat of arms of Mayotte
- Flag of Mayotte

=== Sport ===
- Complexe de Kawani
- Mayotte national rugby union team

==== Football ====
- Coupe de Mayotte
- FC Mtsapéré
- Mayotte Division Honneur
- Mayotte national football team

== Environment ==
=== Wildlife ===
- Boophis
- Mayotte drongo
- Pasteur's day gecko
- Robert Mertens's day gecko
- Common brown lemur

== See also ==
- Lists of country-related topics
