= Bushi language =

Dialect of Malagasy spoken in Mayotte

Bushi
- Shibushi, Kibushi, Kibosy
- bushi-majunga بُوشِ-مَچُونْڠَ
- Native to: Mayotte
- Native speakers: 60,000 (2017)
- Language family: Austronesian: Malayo-Polynesian; Western Indonesian; Barito; East Barito; Malagasy; Bushi
- Dialects: Kiantalaotsy
- Writing system: Latin; Arabic

Language codes
- ISO 639-3: buc
- Glottolog: bush1250

Bushi or Kibosy (Shibushi or Kibushi) is a dialect of Malagasy spoken in the Indian Ocean island of Mayotte. Malagasy dialects most closely related to Bushi are spoken in northwestern Madagascar in the area of Antsiranana (Diego-Suarez) and Mahajanga (Majunga), which is also the closest point in Madagascar to Mayotte. Kibosy and Majunga together are considered one of the Malagasy languages by Glottolog.

== Geographical distribution ==
Bushi is known as Kibushi on Mayotte and is spoken by 40% of the island's people (1980). It is spoken alongside the Maore dialect (Shimaore), a Bantu language. Historically, Kibushi and Shimaore have been spoken in certain villages but Shimaore tends to be the de facto indigenous lingua franca in everyday life because of the larger Shimaore-speaking population. Only Shimaore is represented on the local television news program by Réseau Outre-Mer 1re. Dialects of Bushi in Mayotte (known as Shibushi in Shimaore) include Kiantalaotsy and Kibushi-Kimaore (Shibushi-Shimaore in Shimaore).

Bushi is spoken along the west coast of the main island (Grande-Terre) including the villages of Bambo Est, M'Boueni, Passy-Kéli, Mronabeja, Kani-Kéli, Chirongui, Poroani, Ouangani, Chiconi, Sohoa, M'Tsangamouji, Acoua, Mtsangadoua, and Handrema.

== Phonology ==
In Mayotte, Bushi was traditionally written with an informal French-based Latin orthography. On 22 February 2006, the Conseil de la culture, de l'éducation et de l'environnement de Mayotte introduced an official alphabet that utilizes the basic Latin alphabet without c, j, q, and x and uses three extra letters: ɓ, ɗ, and n̈. Here, the letters used in the orthography are bracketed, following their IPA counterparts. On March 3, 2020, the Conseil départemental de Mayotte announced the adoption of official orthographies in both Latin and Arabic scripts for Kibushi.

=== Vowels ===
Bushi has five vowels.

	Front	Back
Close	i ⟨i⟩	u ⟨u⟩
Mid	e ⟨e⟩	o ⟨o⟩
Open	a ⟨a⟩	

=== Consonants ===
Bushi has 20 consonants.

		Labial	Alveolar	Palatal	Velar	Glottal
Nasal		m ⟨m⟩	n ⟨n⟩		ŋ ⟨n̈⟩	
Plosive	voiceless	p ⟨p⟩	t ⟨t⟩		k ⟨k⟩	
Plosive	voiced	b ⟨b⟩	d ⟨d⟩		ɡ ⟨g⟩	
Plosive	implosive	ɓ ⟨ɓ⟩	ɗ ⟨ɗ⟩			
Fricative	voiceless	f ⟨f⟩	s ⟨s⟩			h ⟨h⟩
Fricative	voiced	v ⟨v⟩	z ⟨z⟩			
Approximant			l ⟨l⟩	j ⟨y⟩	w ⟨w⟩	
Trill			r ⟨r⟩			

== Vocabulary ==
=== Numbers ===
- number or digit: isaka
- to count: mañisaka

Number	Bushi	English
1	araiky	one
2	arôy, aroay	two
3	telo	three
4	efatra	four
5	dimy	five
6	tchouta, tsiota, tshouta	six
7	fito	seven
8	valo	eight
9	sivy	nine
10	folo	ten
11	folo araiky amby, ambin' ny	eleven
12	folo aro amby	twelve
13	folo telo amby	thirteen
14	folo efatra amby	fourteen
15	folo dimy amby	fifteen
16	folo tchouta amby	sixteen
17	folo fito amby	seventeen
18	folo valo amby	eighteen
19	folo sivy amby	nineteen
20	aro polo	twenty
30	telo polo	thirty
40	efa polo	forty
50	dimy polo	fifty
60	tsiota polo	sixty
70	fito polo	seventy
80	valo polo	eighty
90	sivy polo	ninety
100	zato	one hundred
101	zato araiky	one hundred and one
110	zato folo	one hundred and ten
111	zato folo araiky amby	one hundred and eleven
200	aro zato, aroan zato	two hundred
300	telon zato	three hundred
400	efan zato	four hundred
500	diman zato	five hundred
600	tsiotan zato	six hundred
700	fiton zato	seven hundred
800	valon zato	eight hundred
900	sivin zato	nine hundred
1,000	arivo	one thousand
2,000	aroy arivo	two thousand
3,000	telo arivo	three thousand
4,000	efatra arivo	four thousand
5,000	dimy arivo	five thousand
10,000	alina	ten thousand
100,000	hetsy	one hundred thousand
1,000,000	tapitrisa	one million
1,000,000,000	miliara	one billion

=== Comparisons with Malagasy ===
Gloss	Bushi	Standard Malagasy
1	araiky	iray
2	arôy, aroay	roa
3	telo	telo
4	efatra	efatra
5	dimy	dimy
6	tchouta, tsiota, tshouta	enina
7	fito	fito
8	valo	valo
9	sivy	sivy
10	folo	folo
I	zaho	izaho, aho
you	anao, anareo	anao, anareo
he, she	izy	izy
we	atsika	isika
they	reo	aareo
all	jiaby	rehetra, avy
and	ndraiky, ndraika	sy
yet	mbola	mbola
not	tsy	tsy
too	ka, koa	koa
today	niany	androany
week	herignandra	herinandro
in, inside	agnaty	anaty
thing	raha	zavatra
food	anigny	sakafo, anina
child	zaza, tsaiky	zaza
woman	viavy	vehevavy
man	lalahy	lehilahy
thank you	marahaba	misaotra
France	Farantsa	Frantsa
your house	tragnonareo	tranonareo
to listen	mitandregny	mihaino

== See also ==
- Languages of Mayotte
