= Mont Choungui =

Mountain on Mayotte, Comoro

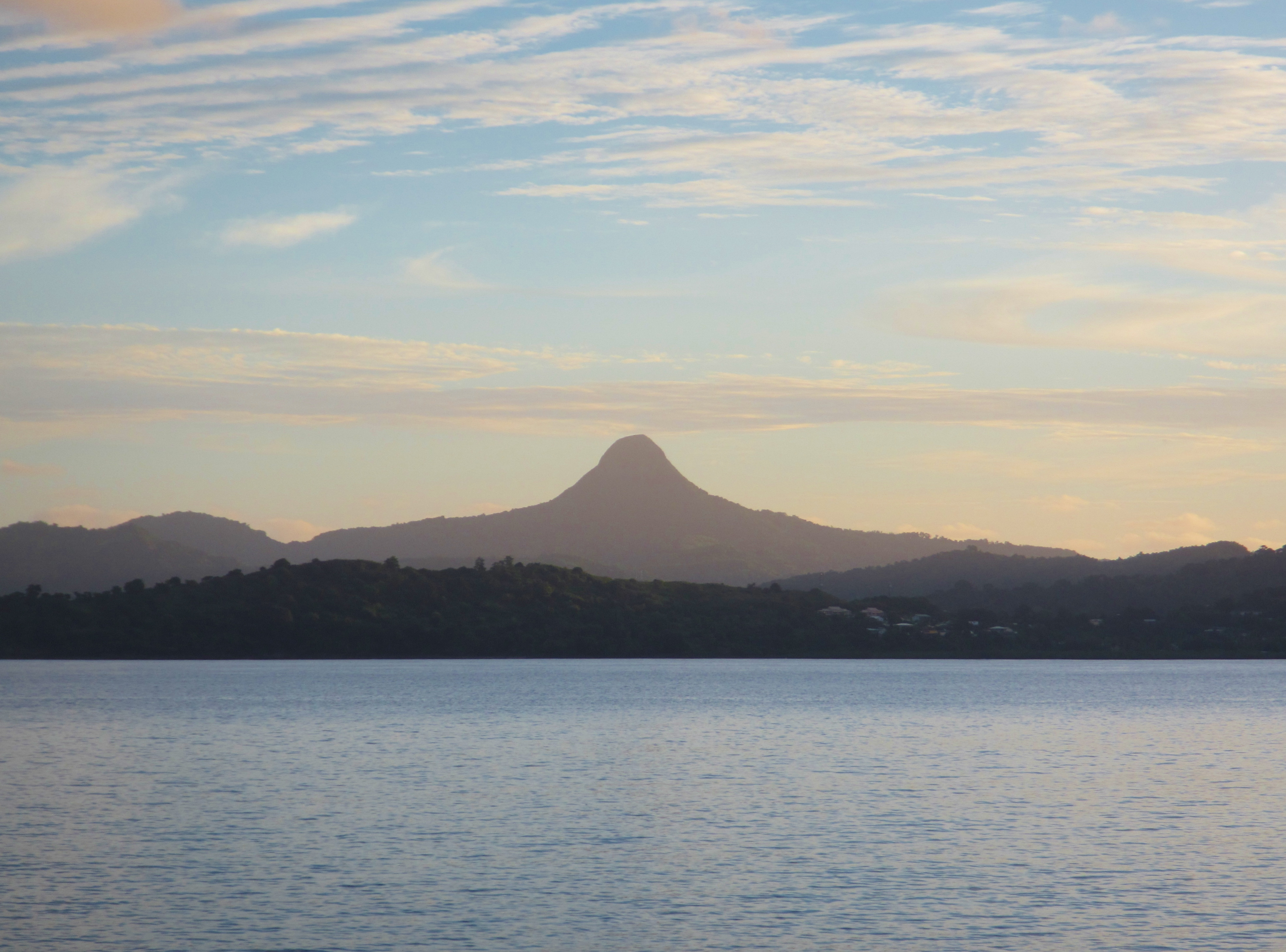

Highest point
- Elevation: 593 m (1,946 ft)
- Coordinates: 12°57′25″S 45°08′02″E

Geography
- Location within Mayotte
- Location: Near Choungui, Kani-Keli, Mayotte, French Overseas Territories

Mont Choungui (French pronunciation: [mɔ̃ ʃuŋɡi]) is a distinctively conical volcanic mountain in the southern part of the French island of Mayotte, in the Comoro archipelago of the western Indian Ocean. It is the second highest point of the island at 593 m (1,946 ft), the highest being Mont Bénara, and is visible from far out at sea.

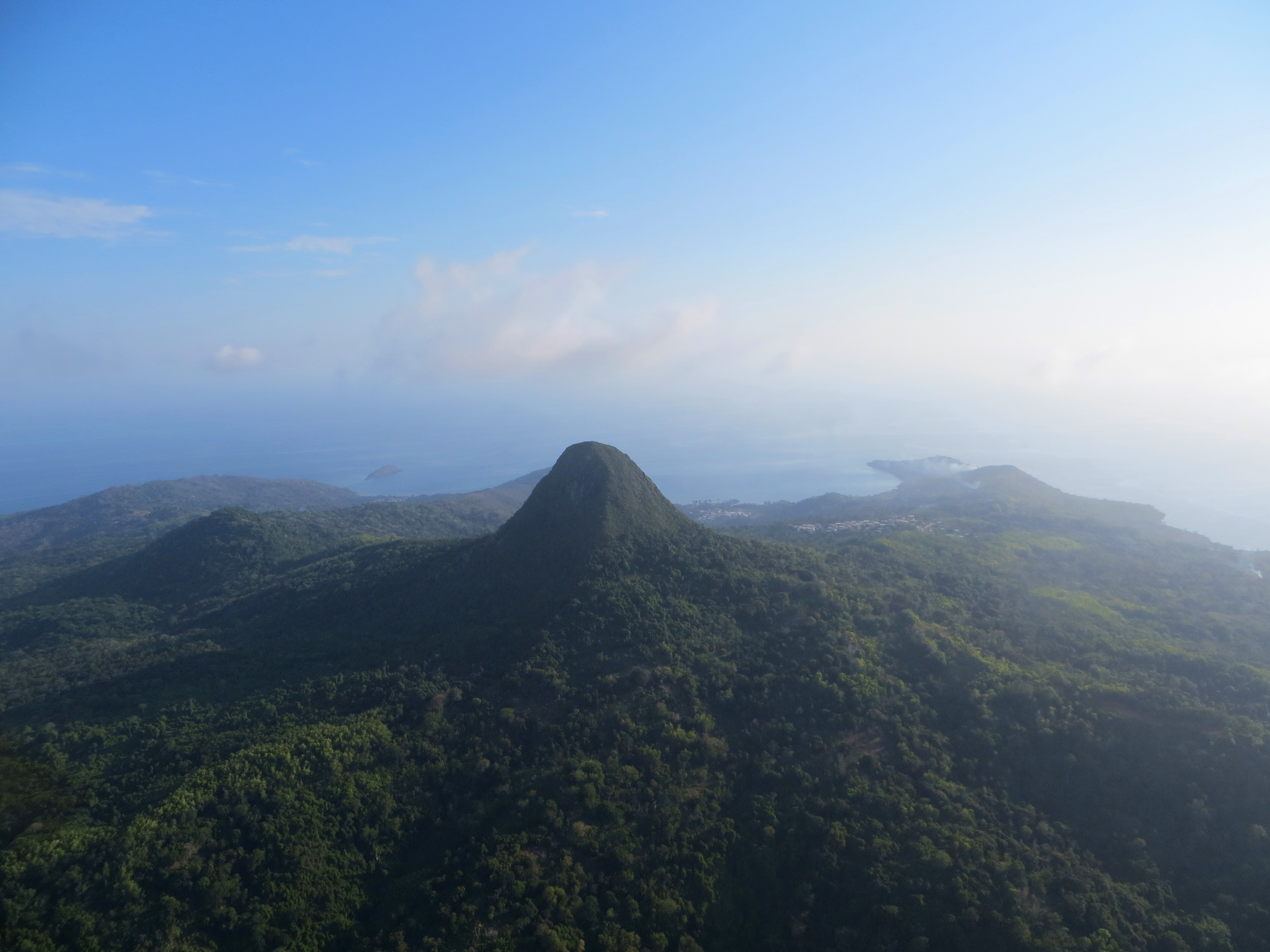
Plane view.

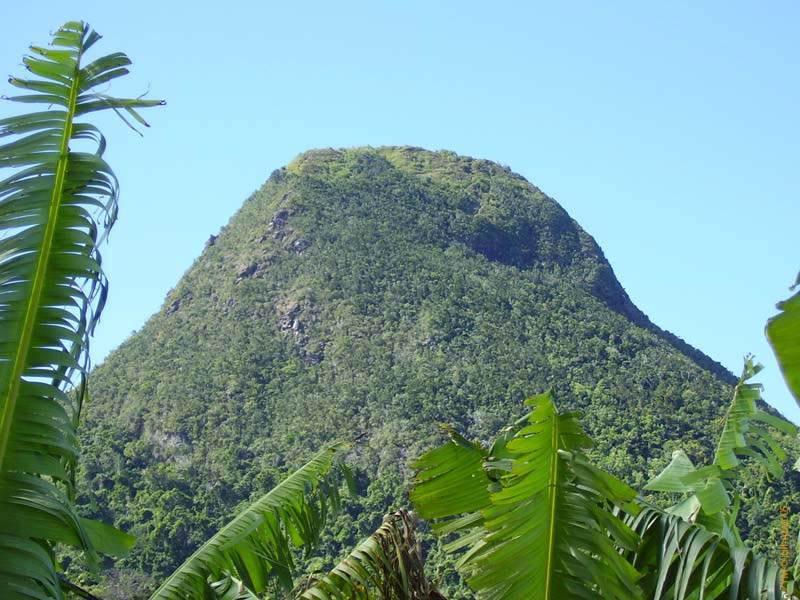
Summit.

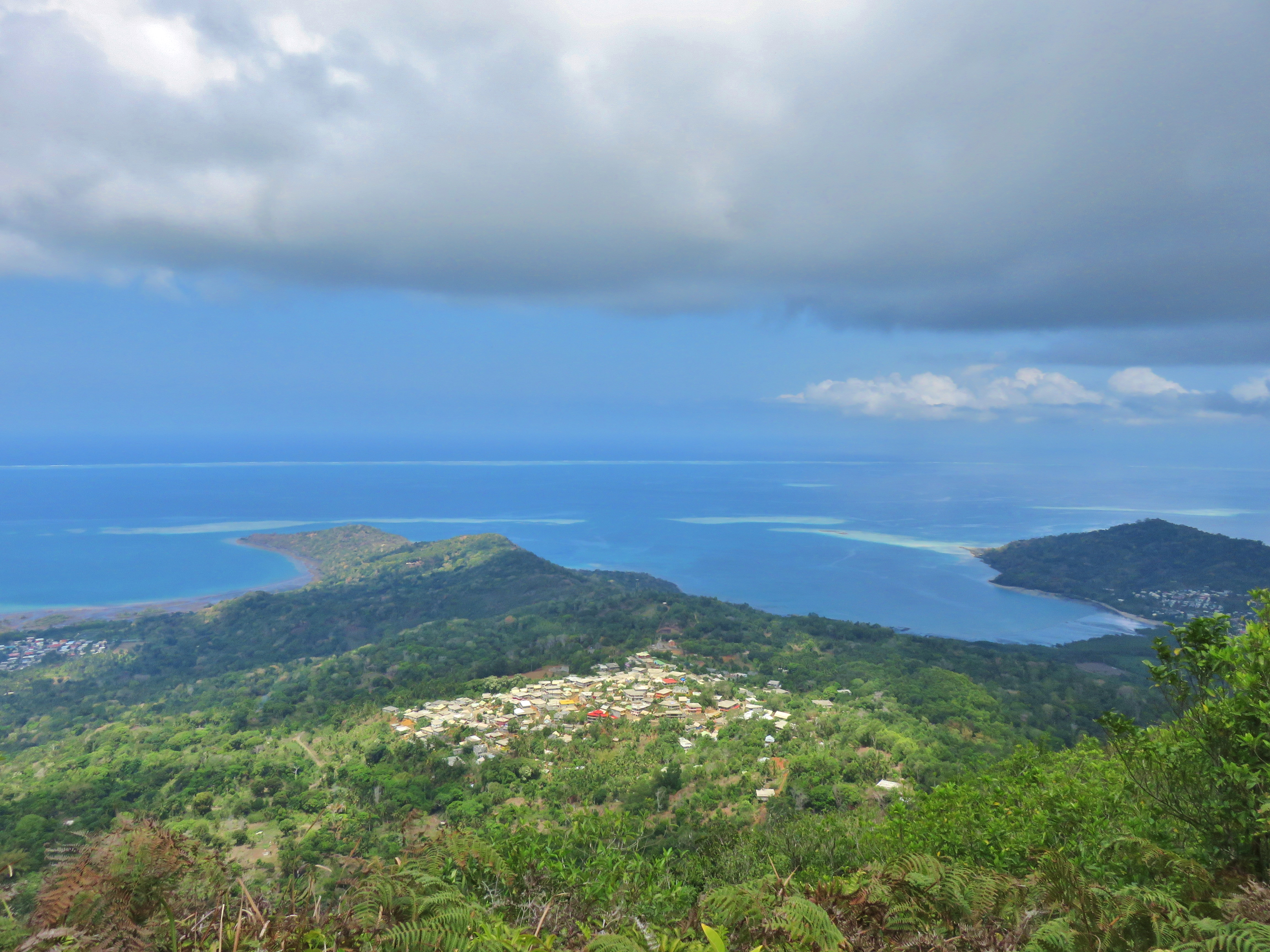
View from the mont, heading southward.

== Important Bird Area ==
Choungui dominates the southern peninsula of the island. Its south-easternmost headland, Pointe Saziley, is 4 km long with a sharp ridge rising to 233 metres (764 ft). Forest covers the peak and most of the catchment of the Mroni Bé river, while Sazilé is vegetated with dry shrubland and thickets containing baobabs. The 1,600-hectare (4,000-acre) site has been identified as an Important Bird Area (IBA) by BirdLife International because it supports significant populations of Comoro olive-pigeons, Comoro blue-pigeons, Mayotte white-eyes, Mayotte sunbirds and red-headed fodies. It is also home to Robert Mertens's day geckos, island day geckos and Pasteur's day geckos. Sazilé's beaches are a nesting site for green, and probably hawksbill, sea turtles.
