= Shibushi =

Shibushi may refer to:

- Shibushi, Kagoshima, a city in Kagoshima, Japan
- Shibushi, another name for the Bushi language
