= Choungui =

- Village
- Location within Mayotte
- Coordinates: 12°57′34″S 45°7′28″E
- Country: France
- Overseas Territory: Mayotte
- Commune: Kani-Kéli

Population (2007)
  - Total: 772
- Time zone: UTC+3 (EAT)

Choungui is a village in the commune of Kani-Kéli on Mayotte. It is located in south-western Mayotte, to the north of Mronabeja and to the east of Kanibe. The commune as of 2007 the community had a total population of 772 people. A football ground is located in the southern part of the village. One of the highest parts of the island, Mont Choungui, is nearby.
