= Cyclone Dikeledi =

South-West Indian Ocean intense tropical cyclone in 2024–2025

Intense Tropical Cyclone Dikeledi
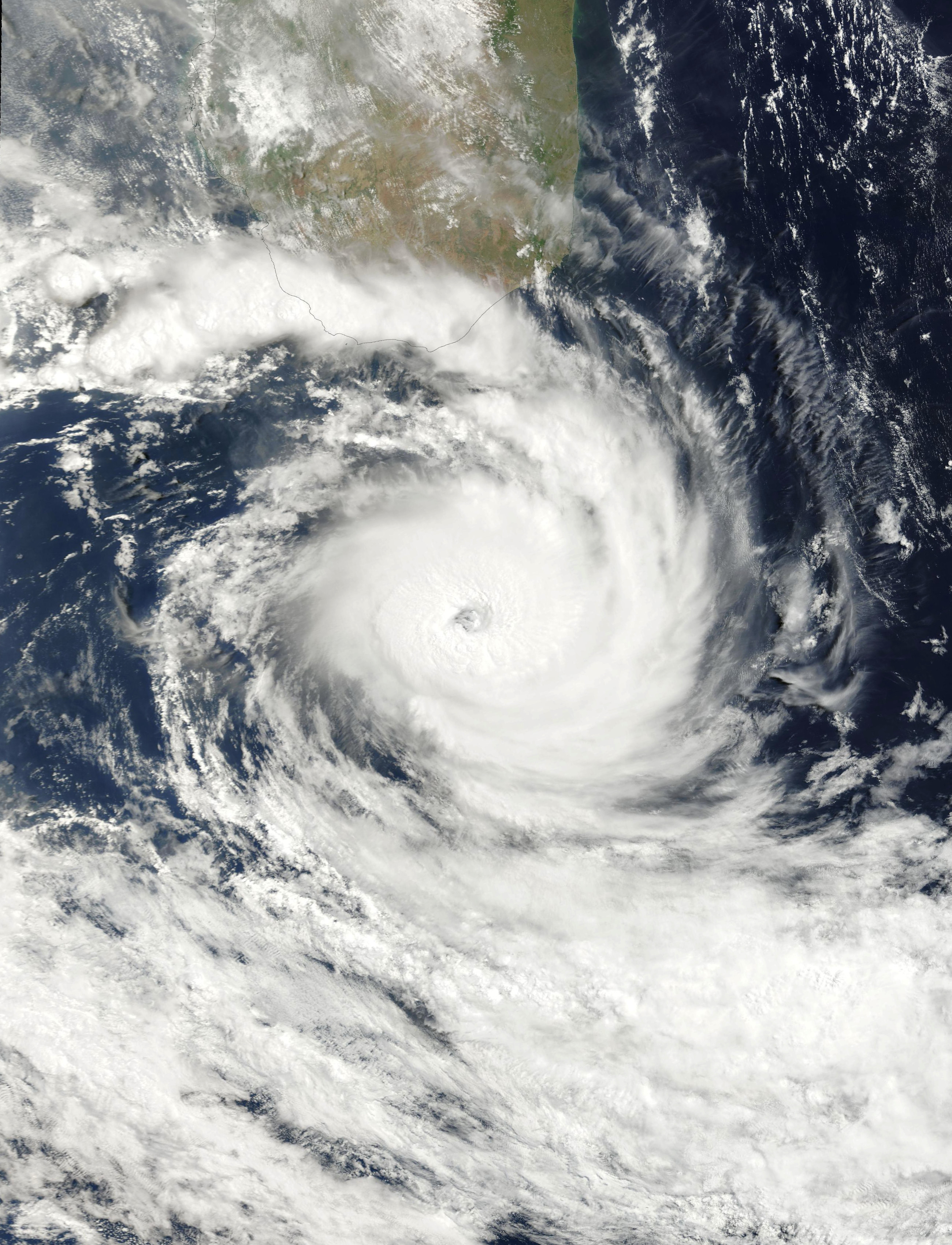
- Dikeledi during its peak intensity south of Madagascar on 16 January.

Meteorological history
- Formed: 30 December 2024
- Extratropical: 17 January 2025
- Dissipated: 21 January 2025

Intense tropical cyclone
- 10-minute sustained (MFR)
- Highest winds: 175 km/h (110 mph)
- Lowest pressure: 947 hPa (mbar); 27.96 inHg

Category 3-equivalent tropical cyclone
- 1-minute sustained (SSHWS/JTWC)
- Highest winds: 195 km/h (120 mph)
- Lowest pressure: 950 hPa (mbar); 28.05 inHg

Overall effects
- Fatalities: 9
- Damage: $20 million (2025 USD)
- Areas affected: Northern Madagascar; Mayotte; Mozambique
- Part of the 2024–25 Australian region and South-West Indian Ocean cyclone seasons

Intense Tropical Cyclone Dikeledi (Note: meaning tears in Sotho) was a long-lived tropical cyclone that traversed the southern Indian Ocean in December 2024 and January 2025. Dikeledi is the fourth named storm and the third intense tropical cyclone of the 2024–25 South-West Indian Ocean cyclone season. It formed south of Java, Indonesia as a tropical low on 30 December 2024, traversing the southern Indian Ocean before entering the South-West Indian Ocean basin on 4 January, and the Météo-France office in Réunion (MFR) monitoring the system two days later. On the following day, the MFR upgraded the system to a tropical depression, with deep convection having developed and microwave overpass images suggesting the circulation beginning to organize. The MFR upgraded the depression to a moderate tropical storm on 9 January, and then a tropical cyclone the following day. Dikeledi made landfall near Antsiranana, Madagascar on 12 January. Estimates from Gallagher Re place losses at US$20 million.

== Meteorological history ==
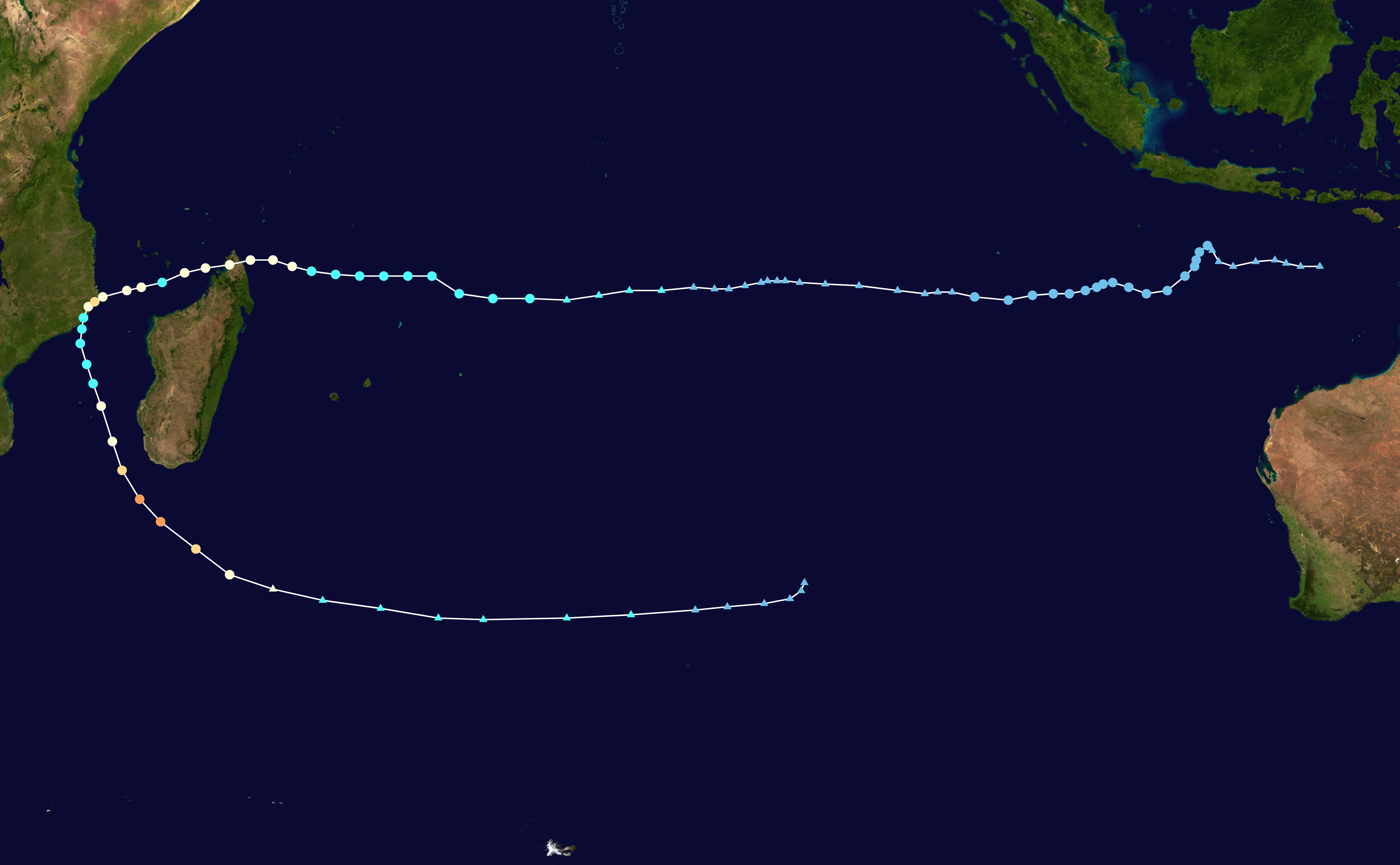
Map plotting the storm's track and intensity, according to the Saffir–Simpson scale Map key Saffir–Simpson scale Tropical depression (≤38 mph, ≤62 km/h) Tropical storm (39–73 mph, 63–118 km/h) Category 1 (74–95 mph, 119–153 km/h) Category 2 (96–110 mph, 154–177 km/h) Category 3 (111–129 mph, 178–208 km/h) Category 4 (130–156 mph, 209–251 km/h) Category 5 (≥157 mph, ≥252 km/h) Unknown Storm type Tropical cyclone Subtropical cyclone Extratropical cyclone, remnant low, tropical disturbance, or monsoon depression

Dikeledi originally formed south of Java, Indonesia as a tropical low on 30 December 2024 and was assigned the designation 08U by the BoM before traversing the southern Indian Ocean into the RSMC La Reunion area of responsibility late on 4 January 2025. Advanced scatterometer data on 6 January indicated that the low-level circulation was elongated with max winds present at 40 km/h (25 mph) on the southern side. Meteo-France also stated the associated convection was still poorly organized, but nonetheless it began to issue warnings at 12:00 UTC the same day while classifying the system as a Zone of Disturbed Weather. The Joint Typhoon Warning Center (JTWC) issued a Tropical Cyclone Formation Alert (TCFA) on this system on 7 January as it became better organized. On the following day, Meteo-France upgraded 05 to a tropical depression, with deep convection having developed and microwave overpass images suggesting the circulation beginning to organize, and then the RSMC named the system Dikeledi early on 9 January. Despite this, the JTWC held its TCFA, but still cited a consolidated low-level centre of circulation with deep flaring convection over the centre. By 11 January, the MFR reported that Dikeledi intensified into a tropical cyclone, with winds of 130 km/h (81 mph). After slightly weakening, the cyclone made landfall near Antsiranana, Madagascar on 12 January. Afterward, Dikeledi weakened back to tropical storm status while over land, emerging into the Mozambique Channel near Nosy-Be. While approaching the coast of Mozambique, the storm reattained tropical cyclone status on 13 January, making landfall in Nampula Province shortly thereafter. Curving southward, the cyclone weakened to tropical storm status over land, but soon reemerged into the Mozambique Channel. Accelerating to the southeast, Dikeledi strengthened back to tropical cyclone intensity on 15 January, due to warm waters and favorable conditions. Passing southwest of southern Madagascar, it strengthened further into an intense tropical cyclone on 16 January, with peak sustained winds of 175 km/h (110 mph); Dikeledi broke the record for the most southerly cyclone of that intensity in the basin, surpassing that of Cyclone Anggrek in 2024. Later that day, stronger wind shear caused the cyclone to rapidly weaken, and the storm transitioned into an extratropical cyclone on 17 January.

== Preparations ==
=== Madagascar ===
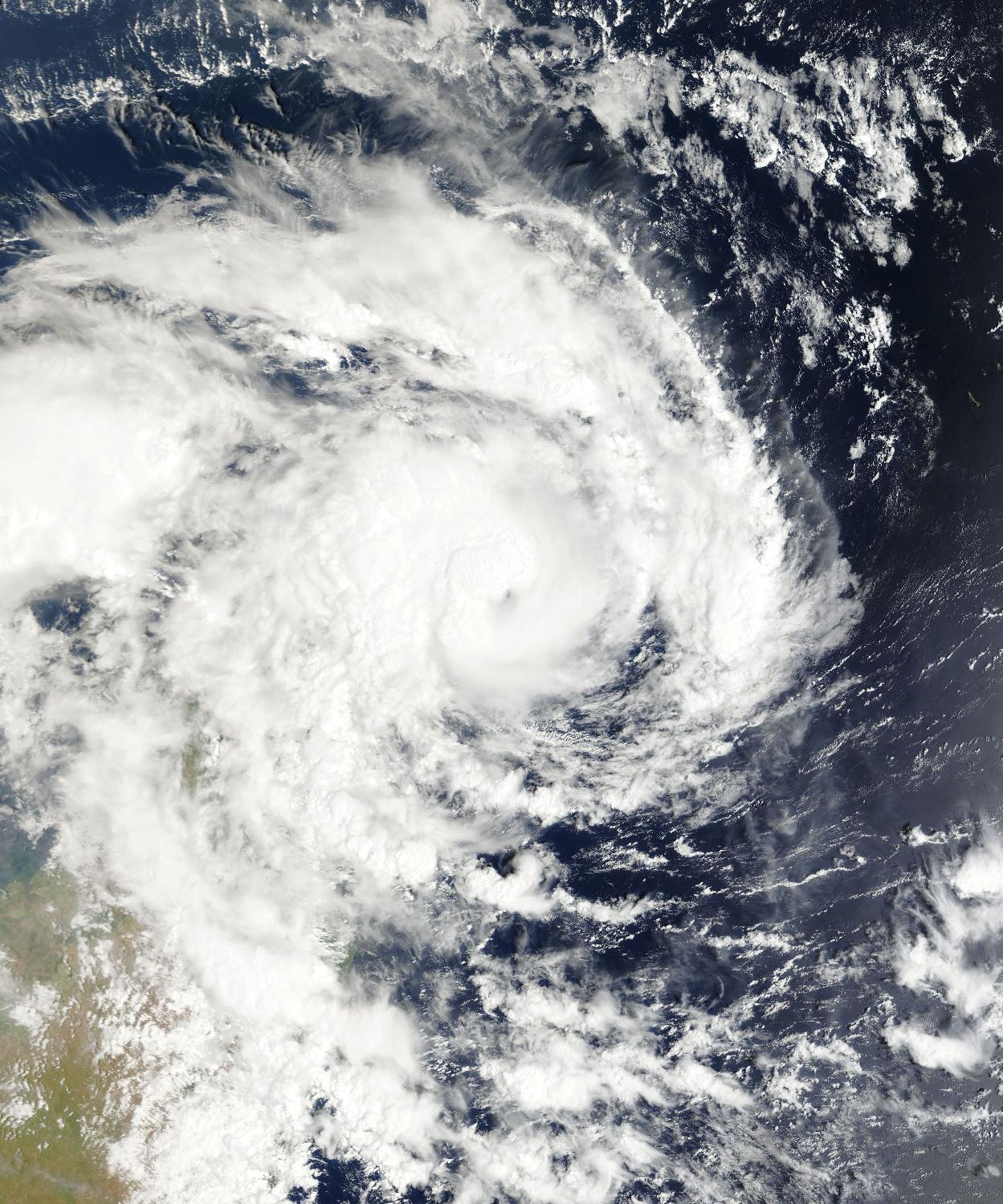
Cyclone Dikeledi near northern Madagascar on 11 January.

On 11 January, the Government of Madagascar reported that Dikeledi was likely to generate 8 m (26 ft) storm surges 120 mm (4.7 in) of rain, 110 km/h (68 mph) winds and 150 km/h (93 mph) gusts, which were likely to cause flooding and landslides throughout the northeast of the island; a red alert for "imminent danger" was issued for Bealanana, Antsohihy, and Analalava. Save the Children said that 22,500 children in the country could be affected by the cyclone, which they warned could lead to a humanitarian crisis in the region. The United Nations Office for the Coordination of Humanitarian Affairs (OCHA) said that heavy rainfall and landslides were likely in northern Madagascar throughout 11-13 January, potentially affecting 45,082 people, with 170 mm (6.7 in) of rainfall expected in the Antsiranana region.

=== Elsewhere ===
In Mayotte, over 14,500 people evacuated to shelters prior to Dikeledi's landfall. OCHA warned on 11 January that the cyclone was likely to affect coastal areas along the Mozambique Channel by 12 January, with heavy rains, strong winds and flooding expected in Mozambique and the Comoros.

== Impact ==
=== Madagascar ===
In Madagascar's Sava Region, the cyclone killed three people, flooded 179 homes, damaged 38 others, displaced 308 residents and caused damage to Route nationale 6, cutting off access to affected areas.

=== Mayotte ===
In Mayotte, which was devastated by Cyclone Chido less than a month prior, Dikeledi brought strong winds that downed power lines, flooding and significant mudslides, with reports that Mbouini, the only area of the territory unaffected by Chido, was flooded.

=== Mozambique ===
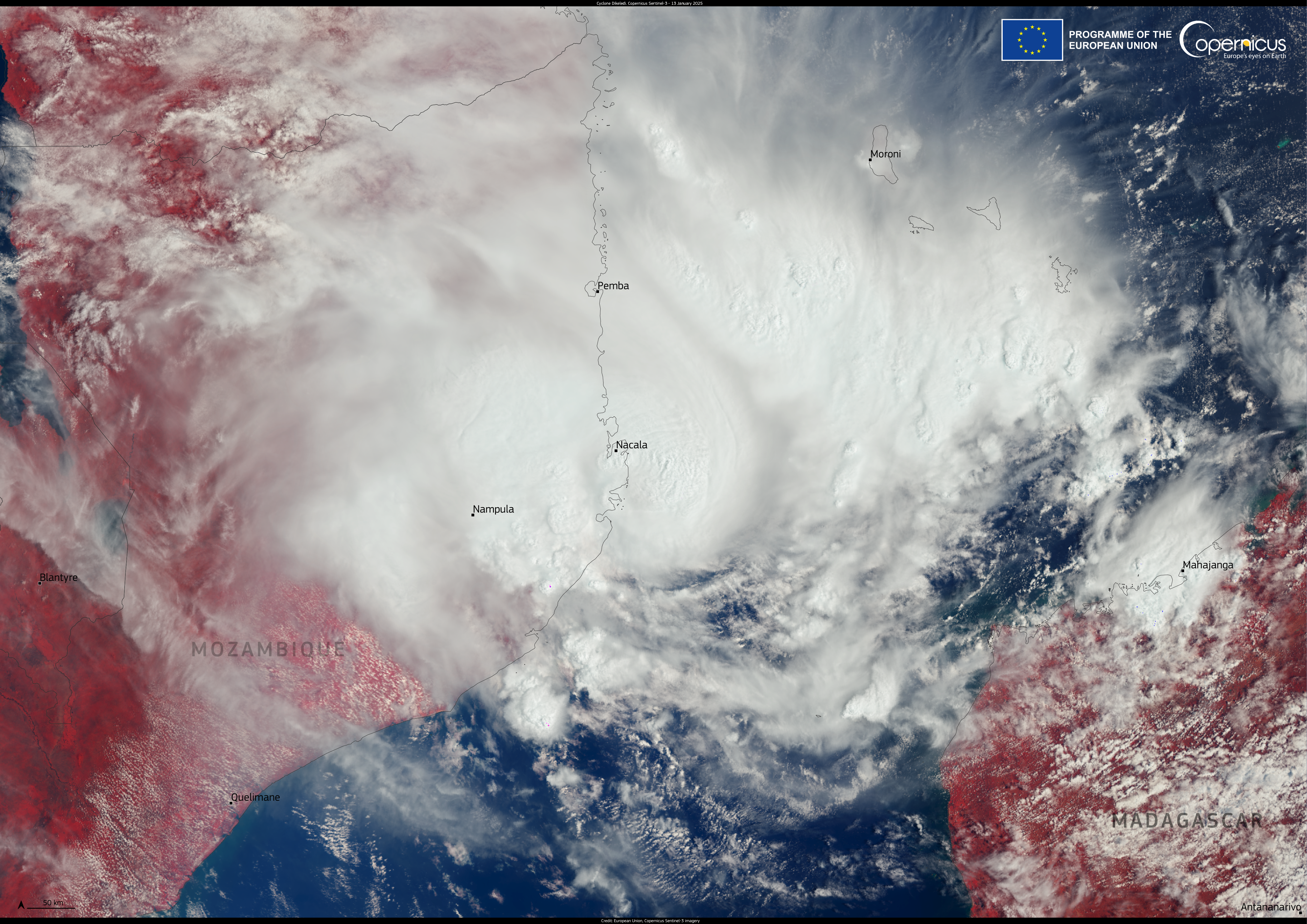
Dikeledi making landfall in Mozambique.

Authorities reported that the rainfall accumulations were most severe in Nampula Province, peaking in Mossuril District with 9.72 in (247 mm), followed by Muecate District with 9.45 in (240.1 mm) and Nampula with 8.28 in (210.4 mm). Sustained winds of 93 mph (150 km/h), with gusts of up to 112 mph (180 km/h), were also reported. According to the National Institute for Disaster Management (INGD), Dikeledi claimed 11 lives and affected more than 70,423 people with more than 15,000 houses damaged and at least 3,381 completely destroyed, 67 kilometers of road damaged and a bridge rendered impassable. Angoche District was the worst hit with 3 of the deaths. Forty-three health facilities and 105 schools were affected in addition to at least 113,000 customers who were left without electricity. Agriculture, one of the main economic activities in the region, was severely affected, compromising food security in the following months.

== See also ==
- Weather of 2024 and 2025
- Tropical cyclones in 2024 and 2025
- Tropical cyclones in the Comoros Islands
- Cyclone Dera (2001) – took a similar track
- Cyclone Ernest (2005) – another strong storm that also had a similar path
- Cyclone Chido (2024) – affected the same areas a month prior
