= Mtsangamboua =

Village in the French municipality of Bandraboua in Mayotte

Coordinates: 12°41′25″S 45°6′35″E

Mtsangamboua is a village in the commune of Bandraboua on Mayotte.
