= Miréréni =

Coordinates: 12°54′21″S 45°9′16″E

Miréréni is a village in the commune of Chirongui on Mayotte, an overseas region of France.
