= Lists of communes of France =

Overview of French communes

The following lists include the communes of France within each department and overseas collectivity.

== Metropolitan France ==
Metropolitan department		List of communes
01	Ain	Communes of the Ain department
02	Aisne	Communes of the Aisne department
03	Allier	Communes of the Allier department
04	Alpes-de-Haute-Provence	Communes of the Alpes-de-Haute-Provence department
05	Hautes-Alpes	Communes of the Hautes-Alpes department
06	Alpes-Maritimes	Communes of the Alpes-Maritimes department
07	Ardèche	Communes of the Ardèche department
08	Ardennes	Communes of the Ardennes department
09	Ariège	Communes of the Ariège department
10	Aube	Communes of the Aube department
11	Aude	Communes of the Aude department
12	Aveyron	Communes of the Aveyron department
13	Bouches-du-Rhône	Communes of the Bouches-du-Rhône department
14	Calvados	Communes of the Calvados department
15	Cantal	Communes of the Cantal department
16	Charente	Communes of the Charente department
17	Charente-Maritime	Communes of the Charente-Maritime department
18	Cher	Communes of the Cher department
19	Corrèze	Communes of the Corrèze department
2A	Corse-du-Sud	Communes of the Corse-du-Sud department
2B	Haute-Corse	Communes of the Haute-Corse department
21	Côte-d'Or	Communes of the Côte-d'Or department
22	Côtes-d'Armor	Communes of the Côtes-d'Armor department
23	Creuse	Communes of the Creuse department
24	Dordogne	Communes of the Dordogne department
25	Doubs	Communes of the Doubs department
26	Drôme	Communes of the Drôme department
27	Eure	Communes of the Eure department
28	Eure-et-Loir	Communes of the Eure-et-Loir department
29	Finistère	Communes of the Finistère department
30	Gard	Communes of the Gard department
31	Haute-Garonne	Communes of the Haute-Garonne department
32	Gers	Communes of the Gers department
33	Gironde	Communes of the Gironde department
34	Hérault	Communes of the Hérault department
35	Ille-et-Vilaine	Communes of the Ille-et-Vilaine department
36	Indre	Communes of the Indre department
37	Indre-et-Loire	Communes of the Indre-et-Loire department
38	Isère	Communes of the Isère department
39	Jura	Communes of the Jura department
40	Landes	Communes of the Landes department
41	Loir-et-Cher	Communes of the Loir-et-Cher department
42	Loire	Communes of the Loire department
43	Haute-Loire	Communes of the Haute-Loire department
44	Loire-Atlantique	Communes of the Loire-Atlantique department
45	Loiret	Communes of the Loiret department
46	Lot	Communes of the Lot department
47	Lot-et-Garonne	Communes of the Lot-et-Garonne department
48	Lozère	Communes of the Lozère department
49	Maine-et-Loire	Communes of the Maine-et-Loire department
50	Manche	Communes of the Manche department
51	Marne	Communes of the Marne department
52	Haute-Marne	Communes of the Haute-Marne department
53	Mayenne	Communes of the Mayenne department
54	Meurthe-et-Moselle	Communes of the Meurthe-et-Moselle department
55	Meuse	Communes of the Meuse department
56	Morbihan	Communes of the Morbihan department
57	Moselle	Communes of the Moselle department
58	Nièvre	Communes of the Nièvre department
59	Nord	Communes of the Nord department
60	Oise	Communes of the Oise department
61	Orne	Communes of the Orne department
62	Pas-de-Calais	Communes of the Pas-de-Calais department
63	Puy-de-Dôme	Communes of the Puy-de-Dôme department
64	Pyrénées-Atlantiques	Communes of the Pyrénées-Atlantiques department
65	Hautes-Pyrénées	Communes of the Hautes-Pyrénées department
66	Pyrénées-Orientales	Communes of the Pyrénées-Orientales department
67	Bas-Rhin	Communes of the Bas-Rhin department
68	Haut-Rhin	Communes of the Haut-Rhin department
69	Rhône	Communes of the Rhône department
69M	Metropolitan Lyon	Communes of the Lyon Metropolis
70	Haute-Saône	Communes of the Haute-Saône department
71	Saône-et-Loire	Communes of the Saône-et-Loire department
72	Sarthe	Communes of the Sarthe department
73	Savoie	Communes of the Savoie department
74	Haute-Savoie	Communes of the Haute-Savoie department
75	Paris	Paris is a commune in itself
76	Seine-Maritime	Communes of the Seine-Maritime department
77	Seine-et-Marne	Communes of the Seine-et-Marne department
78	Yvelines	Communes of the Yvelines department
79	Deux-Sèvres	Communes of the Deux-Sèvres department
80	Somme	Communes of the Somme department
81	Tarn	Communes of the Tarn department
82	Tarn-et-Garonne	Communes of the Tarn-et-Garonne department
83	Var	Communes of the Var department
84	Vaucluse	Communes of the Vaucluse department
85	Vendée	Communes of the Vendée department
86	Vienne	Communes of the Vienne department
87	Haute-Vienne	Communes of the Haute-Vienne department
88	Vosges	Communes of the Vosges department
89	Yonne	Communes of the Yonne department
90	Territoire de Belfort	Communes of the Territoire de Belfort department
91	Essonne	Communes of the Essonne department
92	Hauts-de-Seine	Communes of the Hauts-de-Seine department
93	Seine-Saint-Denis	Communes of the Seine-Saint-Denis department
94	Val-de-Marne	Communes of the Val-de-Marne department
95	Val-d'Oise	Communes of the Val-d'Oise department

== Overseas France ==
Overseas departments (département d'outre-mer or DOM):

Overseas department		List of communes
971	Guadeloupe	Communes of the Guadeloupe department
972	Martinique	Communes of the Martinique department
973	Guyane	Communes of French Guiana
974	Réunion	Communes of the Réunion department
976	Mayotte	Communes of Mayotte

Overseas collectivities (collectivité d'outre-mer or COM):

Overseas collectivity		List of communes
975	Saint Pierre and Miquelon	Miquelon-Langlade; Saint-Pierre
987	French Polynesia (Polynésie française)	Administrative divisions of French Polynesia
988	New Caledonia (Nouvelle-Calédonie)	Administrative divisions of New Caledonia

== See also ==
- Administrative divisions of France
- List of communes in France with over 20,000 inhabitants
