= Mramadoudou =

Human settlement in Mayotte, France

Coordinates: 12°55′42″S 45°9′13″E

Mramadoudou is a village in the commune of Chirongui on Mayotte.
