= Dzoumogne =

- Village
- Location within Mayotte
- Coordinates: 12°43′2″S 45°6′46″E
- Country: France
- Overseas Territory: Mayotte
- Commune: Bandraboua
- Time zone: UTC+3 (EAT)

Dzoumogne is a village in the commune of Bandraboua on Mayotte.
