= Malamani =

Village in the French overseas department of Mayotte

Coordinates: 12°55′15″S 45°9′30″E

Malamani is a village in the commune of Chirongui on Mayotte.
