= Ongojou =

Human settlement in France

Coordinates: 12°50′17″S 45°9′31″E

Ongojou is a village in the commune of Dembéni on Mayotte. It is known for its rich history of wine making.
