= Mroualé =

Coordinates: 12°47′20″S 45°7′40″E

Mroualé is a village in the commune of Tsingoni on the island of Mayotte in the Indian Ocean.
