= Tsimkoura =

Village in the commune of Chirongui, Mayotte, France

Coordinates: 12°56′22″S 45°8′19″E

Tsimkoura (French pronunciation: [tsimkuʁa]) is a village in the commune of Chirongui on Mayotte. It is a very small settlement with about 1,400 inhabitants. Tsimkoura is situated about 1.4 km from the central area of Chirongui, and approximately 20 km from Mamoudzou, the capital of Mayotte.
