= Tsararano, Mayotte =

Village on the island of Mayotte, France

Coordinates: 12°50′13″S 45°10′28″E

Tsararano is a village in the commune of Dembéni on Mayotte.
