= Iloni =

Village in Dembeni, Mayotte

- Village
- Location within Mayotte
- Coordinates: 12°50′42″S 45°11′26″E
- Country: France
- Island: Mayotte
- Commune: Dembeni
- Time zone: UTC+3:00 (EAT)

Iloni is a village in the commune of Dembeni on Mayotte Island.
