= Mbouini =

- Village
- Map of Mayotte. Mbouini is located on the southern coast.
- Coordinates: 12°59′24″S 45°8′13″E
- Country: France
- Overseas Territory: Mayotte
- Commune: Kani-Kéli

Mbouini is a village in the commune of Kani-Kéli on Mayotte. It is located on the southern coast of the island.
