= Kavani =

Village on the island of Mayotte, Oversea Department of France

Coordinates: 12°46′59″S 45°13′16″E

Kavani is a village in the commune of Mamoudzou on Mayotte.
