= Communauté d'agglomération du Grand Nord de Mayotte =

Grand Nord de Mayotte
- Communauté d'agglomération
- Interactive map of Grand Nord de Mayotte
- Coordinates: 12°43′S 45°06′E
- Country: France
- Overseas region and department: Mayotte{{{region}}}
- No. of communes: {{{nbcomm}}}
- Established: 2015
- Area: 87.2 km^{2} (33.7 sq mi)
- Population (2019): 60,372
  - Density: 692/km^{2} (1,790/sq mi)

Communauté d'agglomération du Grand Nord de Mayotte is a communauté d'agglomération, an intercommunal structure in the Mayotte overseas department and region of France. Created in 2015, its seat is in Bandraboua. Its area is 87.2 km^{2}. Its population was 60,372 in 2019.

== Composition ==
The communauté d'agglomération consists of the following 4 communes:

1. Acoua
2. Bandraboua
3. Koungou
4. Mtsamboro
