= Vahibé =

Village in a French department in the Indian Ocean

- Village
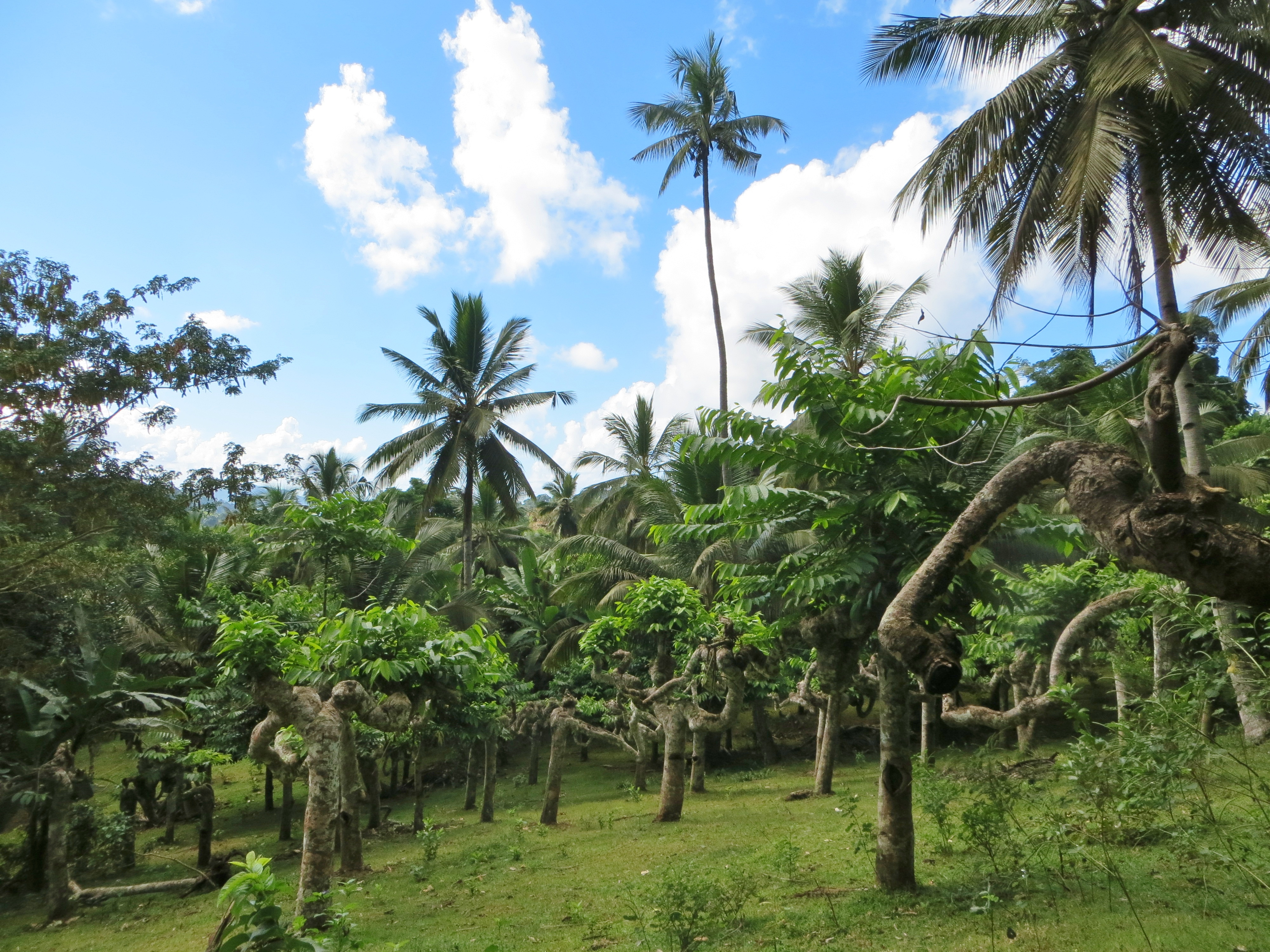
- Ylang ylang trees near Vahibé

- Location within Mayotte
- Coordinates: 12°47′26″S 45°10′41″E
- Country: France (territory)
- Department: Mayotte
- Commune: Mamoudzou
- Time zone: UTC+03:00 (EAT)

Vahibé is a village in the commune of Mamoudzou on Mayotte.

== Geography ==
=== Climate ===
Vahibé has a tropical savanna climate (Köppen climate classification Aw). The average annual temperature in Vahibé is 25.2 °C (77.4 °F). The average annual rainfall is 1,772.4 mm (69.78 in) with January as the wettest month. The temperatures are highest on average in March, at around 26.7 °C (80.1 °F), and lowest in August, at around 23.0 °C (73.4 °F). The highest temperature ever recorded in Vahibé was 35.2 °C (95.4 °F) on 6 May 2012; the coldest temperature ever recorded was 14.5 °C (58.1 °F) on 13 July 2010.

Climate data for Vahibé (1991−2020 normals, extremes 2003−present)
Month	Jan	Feb	Mar	Apr	May	Jun	Jul	Aug	Sep	Oct	Nov	Dec	Year
Record high °C (°F)	33.3 (91.9)	32.0 (89.6)	32.8 (91.0)	32.3 (90.1)	35.2 (95.4)	30.5 (86.9)	29.5 (85.1)	31.9 (89.4)	30.9 (87.6)	31.9 (89.4)	32.6 (90.7)	32.5 (90.5)	35.2 (95.4)
Mean daily maximum °C (°F)	29.5 (85.1)	29.7 (85.5)	30.0 (86.0)	30.2 (86.4)	29.0 (84.2)	27.7 (81.9)	27.0 (80.6)	27.3 (81.1)	28.0 (82.4)	28.8 (83.8)	29.4 (84.9)	29.9 (85.8)	28.9 (84.0)
Daily mean °C (°F)	26.6 (79.9)	26.6 (79.9)	26.7 (80.1)	26.5 (79.7)	25.3 (77.5)	23.9 (75.0)	23.1 (73.6)	23.0 (73.4)	23.7 (74.7)	24.9 (76.8)	25.9 (78.6)	26.4 (79.5)	25.2 (77.4)
Mean daily minimum °C (°F)	23.6 (74.5)	23.6 (74.5)	23.4 (74.1)	22.8 (73.0)	21.6 (70.9)	20.2 (68.4)	19.2 (66.6)	18.7 (65.7)	19.4 (66.9)	20.9 (69.6)	22.3 (72.1)	23.0 (73.4)	21.6 (70.9)
Record low °C (°F)	20.5 (68.9)	20.9 (69.6)	20.5 (68.9)	19.9 (67.8)	17.2 (63.0)	15.8 (60.4)	14.5 (58.1)	15.1 (59.2)	15.3 (59.5)	15.1 (59.2)	18.7 (65.7)	19.9 (67.8)	14.5 (58.1)
Average precipitation mm (inches)	377.1 (14.85)	347.7 (13.69)	316.4 (12.46)	127.7 (5.03)	52.9 (2.08)	29.3 (1.15)	14.6 (0.57)	29.7 (1.17)	30.0 (1.18)	63.4 (2.50)	118.5 (4.67)	265.1 (10.44)	1,772.4 (69.78)
Average precipitation days (≥ 1.0 mm)	17.3	17.2	17.3	9.7	4.8	3.7	2.7	3.7	4.1	6.2	9.9	14.2	110.8
Source: Météo-France
