= Handrema =

Village in the French municipality of Bandraboua in Mayotte

Coordinates: 12°40′53″S 45°6′0″E

Handrema is the smallest village in the commune of Bandraboua on Mayotte. In 2007, its population was 1,485.

Its beach is stony and surrounded by mangroves, which serve to protect the neighbouring lagoon.
