= Mtsangadoua =

Village on Mayotte in the Indian Ocean

Mtsangadoua or M'Tsanguadoua is a village in the commune of Acoua on Mayotte.

== Population ==
Historical population
| Year | Pop. | ±% |
|---|---|---|
| 2002 | 1,320 | — |
| 2007 | 1,346 | +2.0% |
| 2012 | 1,384 | +2.8% |
| 2017 | 1,534 | +10.8% |
