= Communauté d'agglomération de Dembeni-Mamoudzou =

Dembeni-Mamoudzou
- Communauté d'agglomération
- Interactive map of Dembeni-Mamoudzou
- Coordinates: 12°48′S 45°12′E
- Country: France
- Overseas region and department: Mayotte{{{region}}}
- No. of communes: {{{nbcomm}}}
- Established: 2015
- Area: 80.0 km^{2} (30.9 sq mi)
- Population (2019): 89,090
  - Density: 1,110/km^{2} (2,880/sq mi)

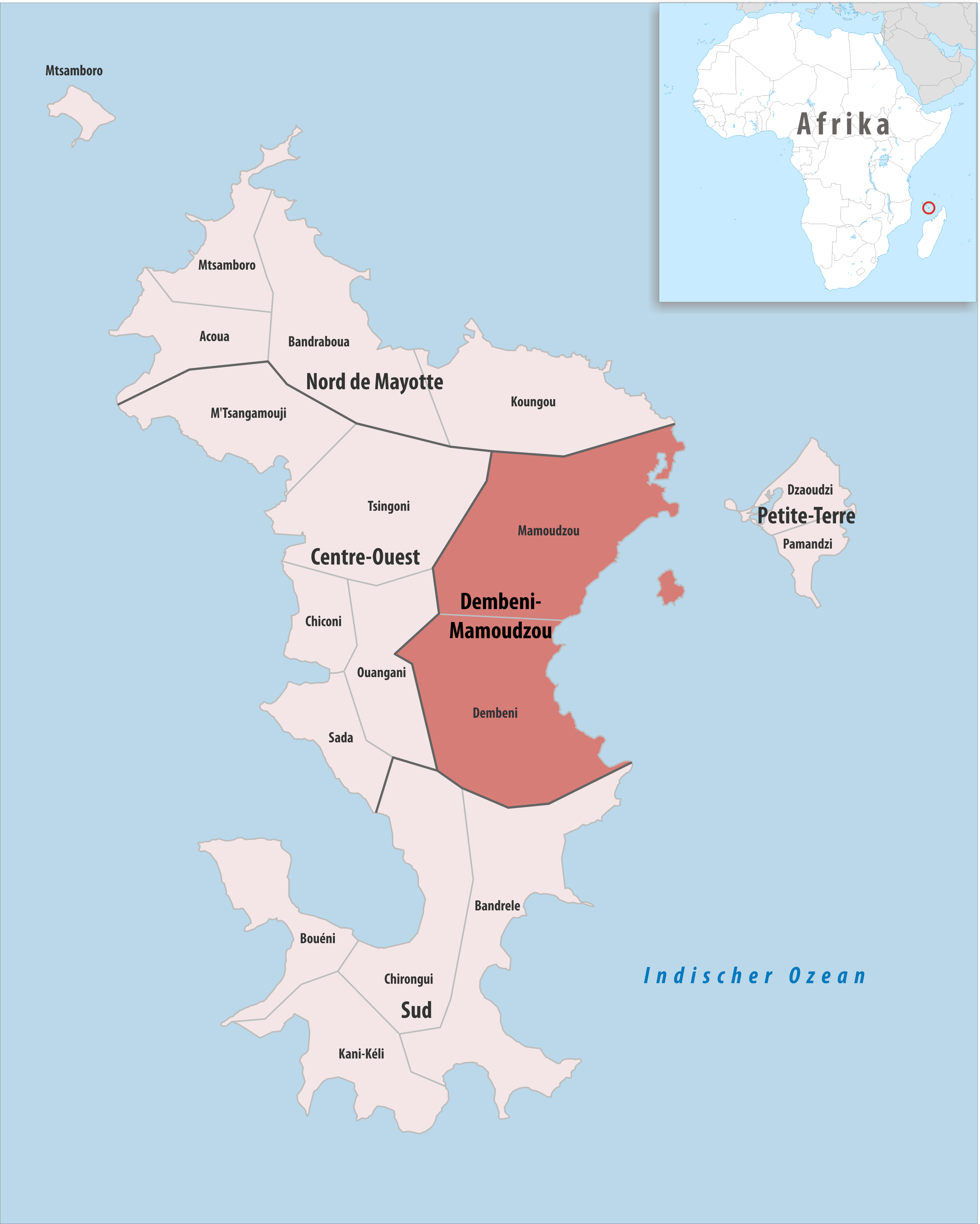

Communauté d'agglomération de Dembeni-Mamoudzou is a communauté d'agglomération, an intercommunal structure in the Mayotte overseas department and region of France. Created in 2015, its seat is in Mamoudzou. Its area is 80.0 km^{2}. Its population was 89,090 in 2019.

== Composition ==
The communauté d'agglomération consists of the following 2 communes:

1. Dembeni
2. Mamoudzou
