= Dembéni =

City in the Comoro Islands

Coordinates: 11°52′S 43°24′E

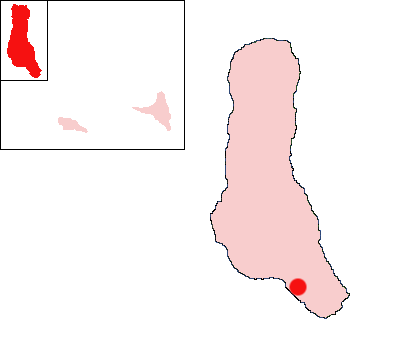
Location of Dembéni on the island of Grande Comore

Dembéni is a town located on the island of Grande Comore in the Comoros.
