= Mronabeja =

Village in the French overseas department of Mayotte

Coordinates: 12°58′46″S 45°7′6″E

Mronabeja is a village in the commune of Kani-Kéli on Mayotte.
