= Sada, Mayotte =

Commune in Mayotte, France

Sada
- Commune
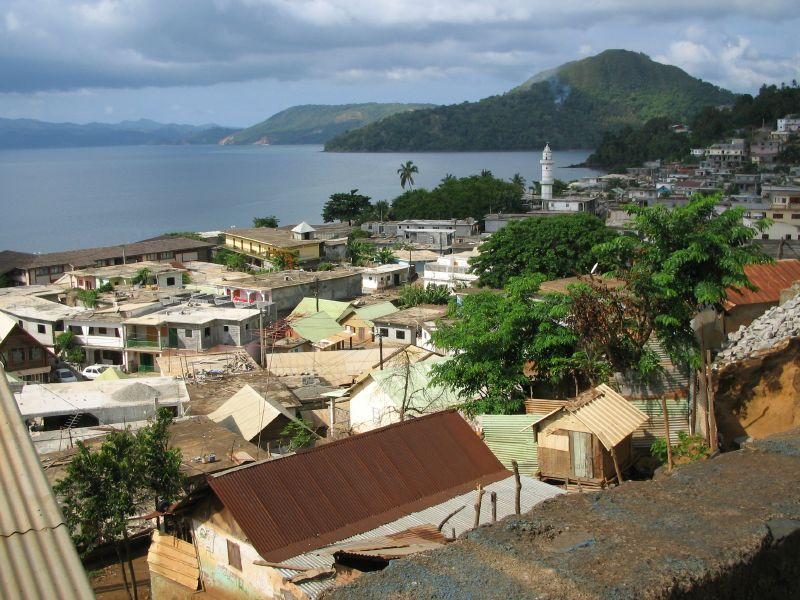

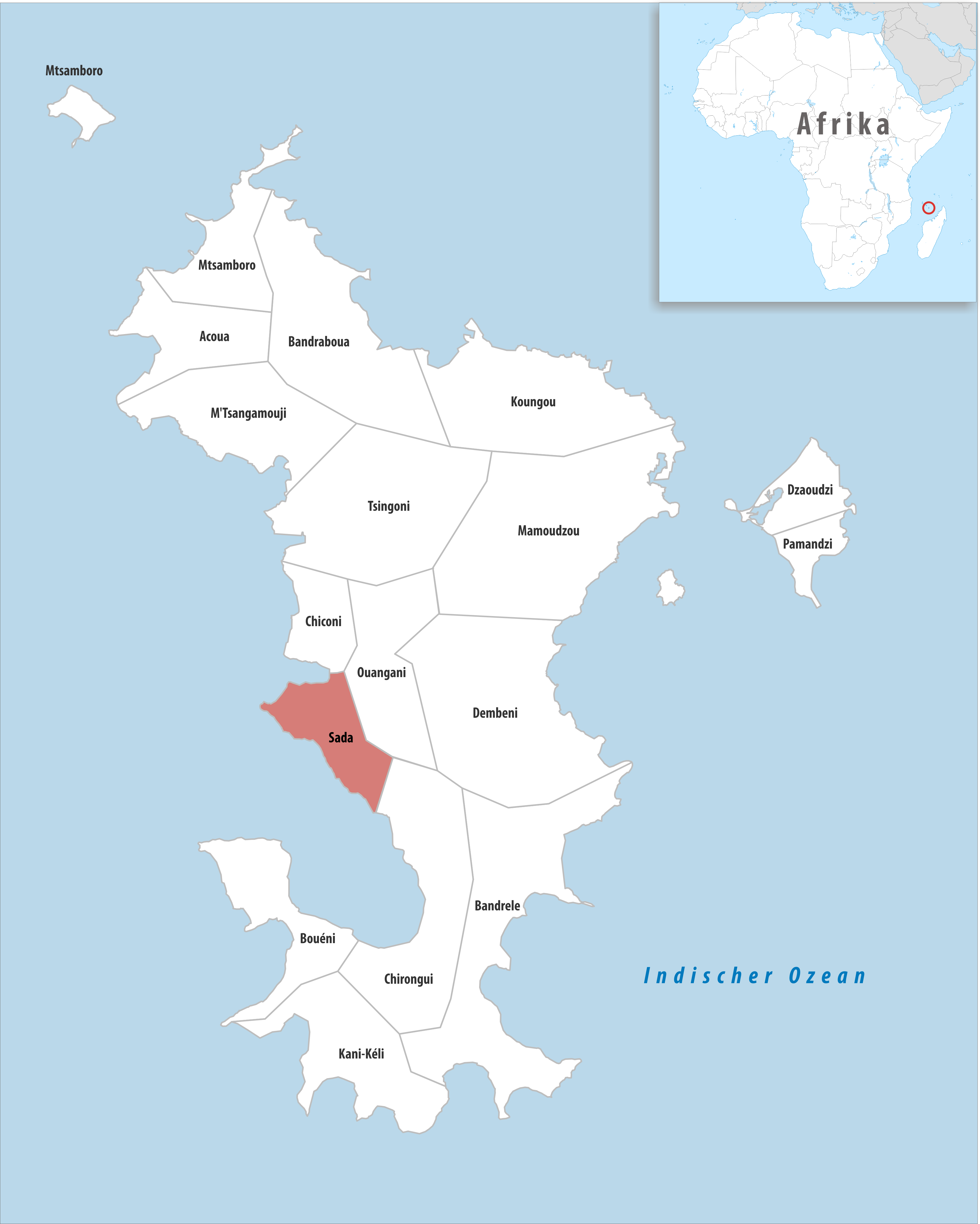
- Location of the commune (in red) within Mayotte
- Location of Sada
- Coordinates: 12°51′04″S 45°05′59″E
- Country: France
- Overseas region and department: Mayotte
- Canton: Sada

Government
  - Mayor (2020–2026): Houssamoudine Abdallah
- Area^{1}: 10.26 km^{2} (3.96 sq mi)
- Population (2017): 11,156
  - Density: 1,087/km^{2} (2,816/sq mi)
- Time zone: UTC+03:00
- INSEE/Postal code: 97616 /97640
- ^{1} French Land Register data, which excludes lakes, ponds, glaciers > 1 km^{2} (0.386 sq mi or 247 acres) and river estuaries.

Sada (French pronunciation: [sada]) is a commune in the French overseas department of Mayotte, in the Indian Ocean.

== Demographics ==
Demographic evolution of Sada
Year	Pop.	±% p.a.
1966	1,944	—
1978	3,228	+4.32%
1985	4,137	+3.61%
1991	5,554	+5.03%
1997	7,434	+4.98%
2002	6,963	−1.30%
2007	8,013	+2.85%
2012	10,195	+4.93%
2017	11,156	+1.82%
Source: SPLAF (1966-2007) and INSEE (2012-2017)
