= Tsingoni =

Commune in Mayotte, France

- Commune
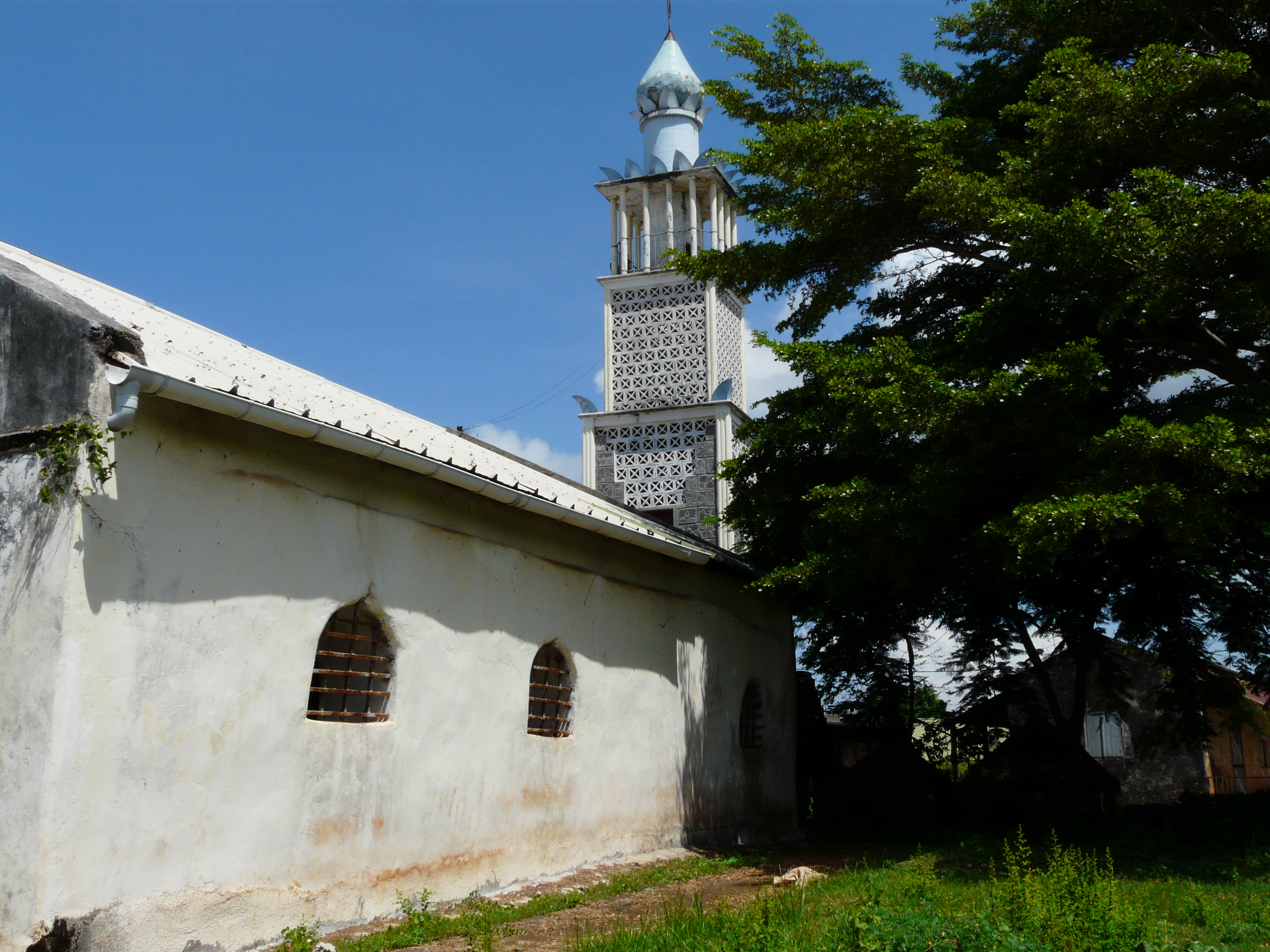
- Tsingoni Mosque

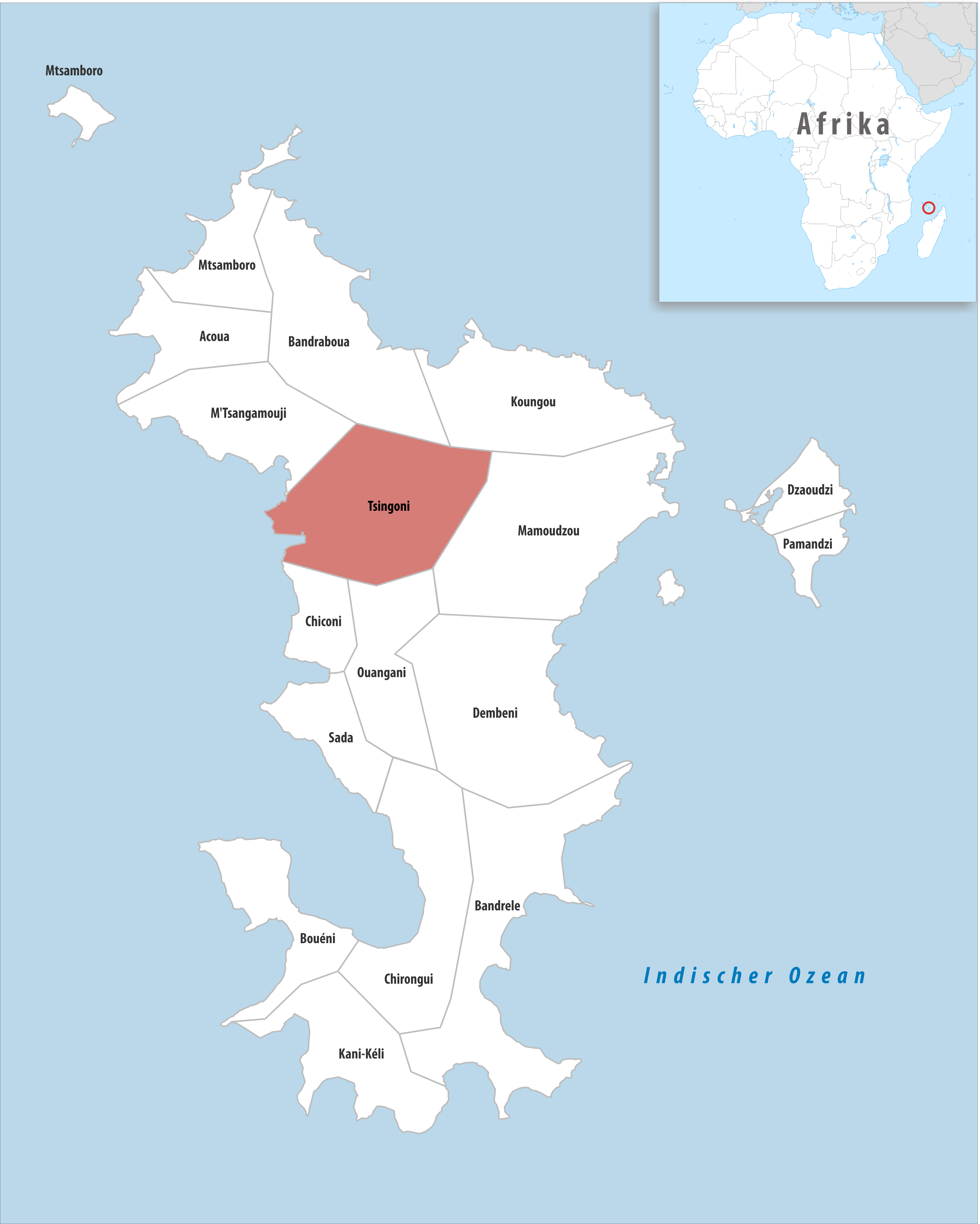
- Location of the commune (in red) within Mayotte
- Location of Tsingoni
- Coordinates: 12°47′09″S 45°06′41″E
- Country: France
- Overseas region and department: Mayotte
- Canton: Tsingoni

Government
  - Mayor (2023–2026): Hamada Issilamou
- Area^{1}: 34.42 km^{2} (13.29 sq mi)
- Highest elevation: 477 m (1,565 ft)
- Lowest elevation: 0 m (0 ft)
- Population (2017): 13,934
  - Density: 404.8/km^{2} (1,048/sq mi)
- Time zone: UTC+03:00
- INSEE/Postal code: 97617 /97680
- ^{1} French Land Register data, which excludes lakes, ponds, glaciers > 1 km^{2} (0.386 sq mi or 247 acres) and river estuaries.

Tsingoni (French pronunciation: [tsiŋɡɔni]) is a commune in the French overseas department of Mayotte, in the Indian Ocean.

== Mosque ==
Tsingoni Mosque, originally built in 1538, is the oldest active mosque in France. It is a listed monument since 2015.

== See also ==
- Southeast Africa
