= Chiconi =

Commune in Mayotte, France

- Commune
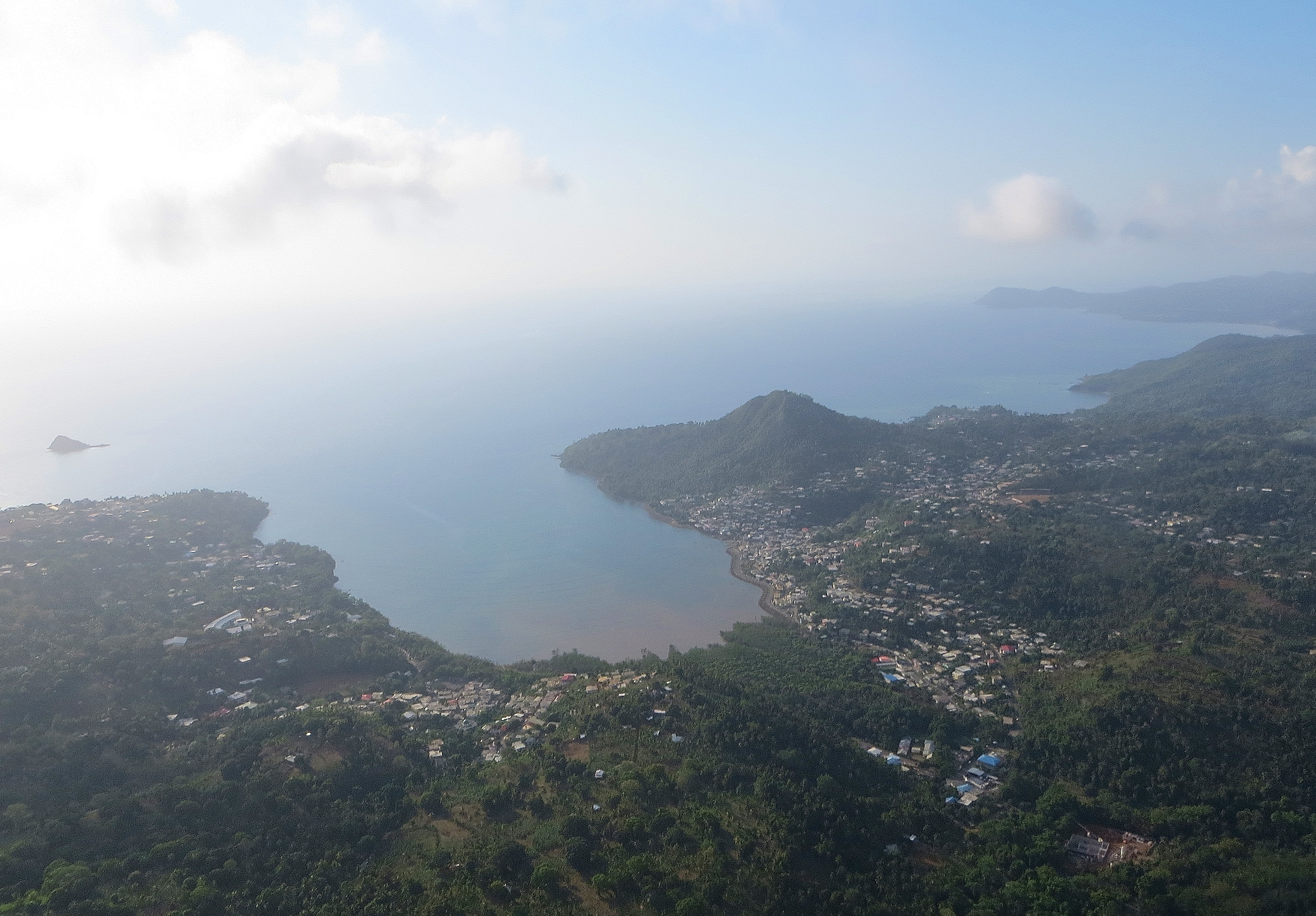
- Aerial view

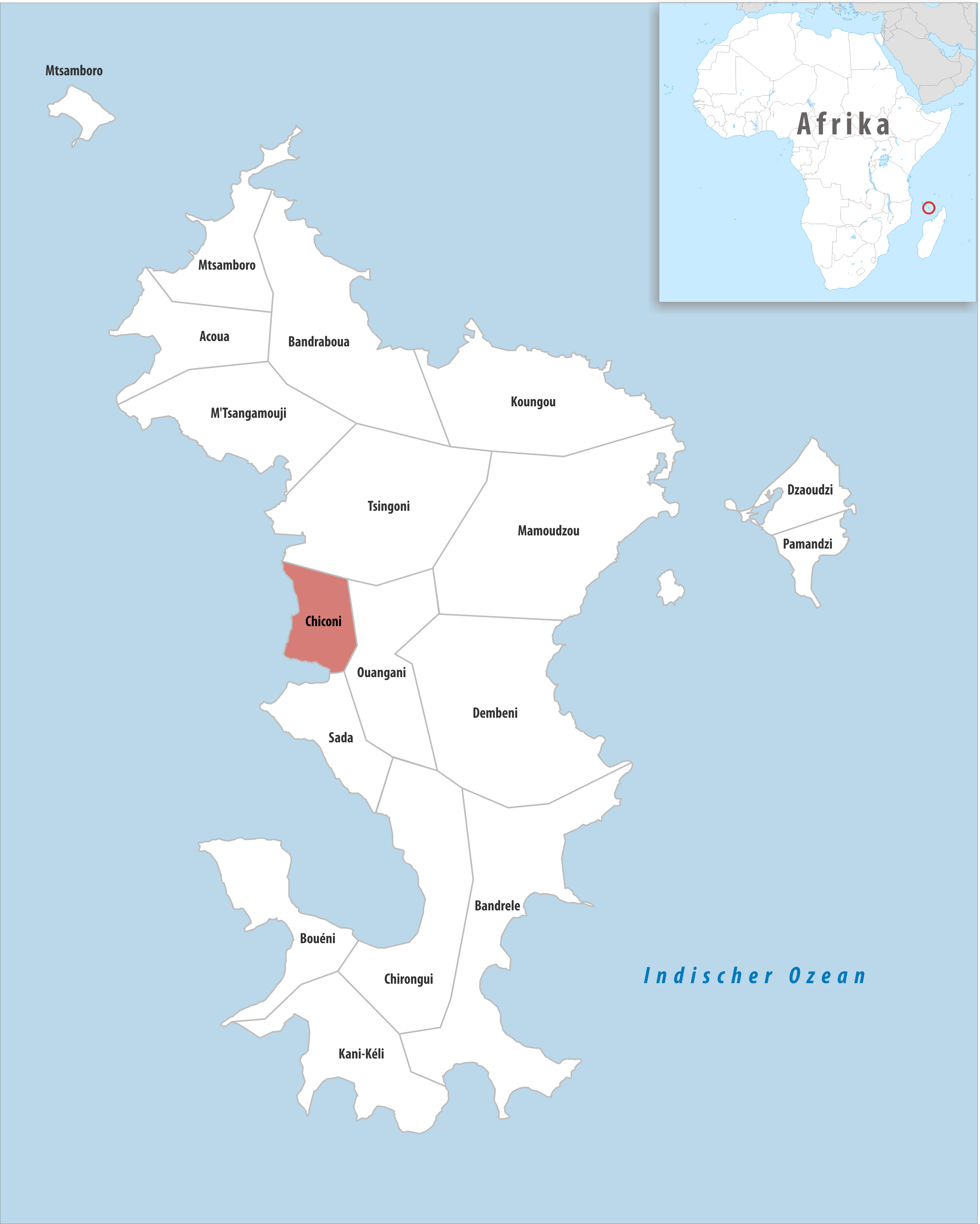
- Location of the commune (in red) within Mayotte
- Location of Chiconi
- Coordinates: 12°49′59″S 45°06′52″E
- Country: France
- Overseas region and department: Mayotte
- Canton: Ouangani

Government
  - Mayor (2020–2026): Mohamadi Madi Ousséni
- Area^{1}: 8.51 km^{2} (3.29 sq mi)
- Population (2017): 8,295
  - Density: 975/km^{2} (2,520/sq mi)
- Time zone: UTC+03:00
- INSEE/Postal code: 97605 /97670
- ^{1} French Land Register data, which excludes lakes, ponds, glaciers > 1 km^{2} (0.386 sq mi or 247 acres) and river estuaries.

Chiconi (French pronunciation: [ʃikɔni]) is a commune in the French overseas department of Mayotte, in the Indian Ocean.

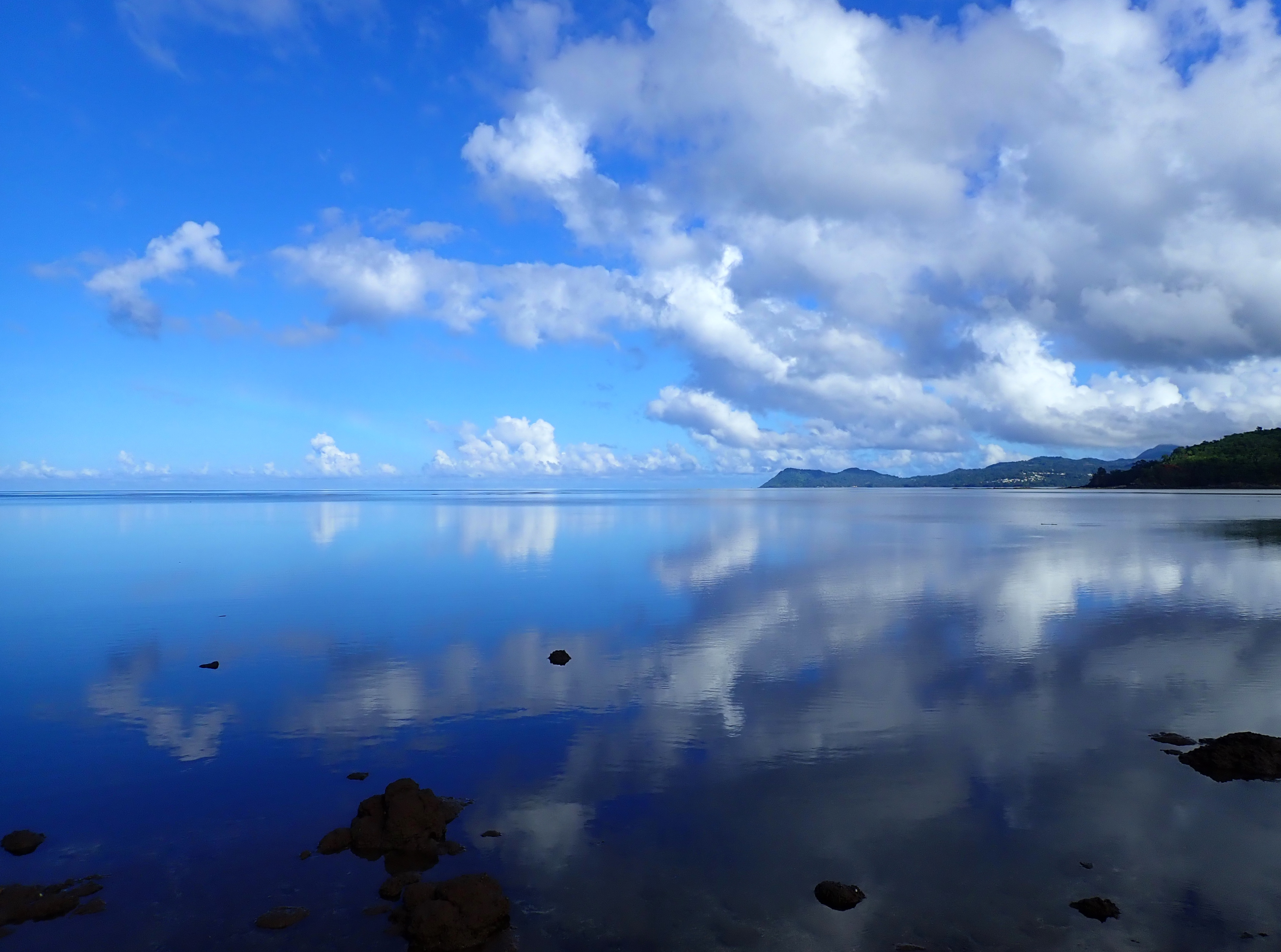
Sohoa beach at low tide

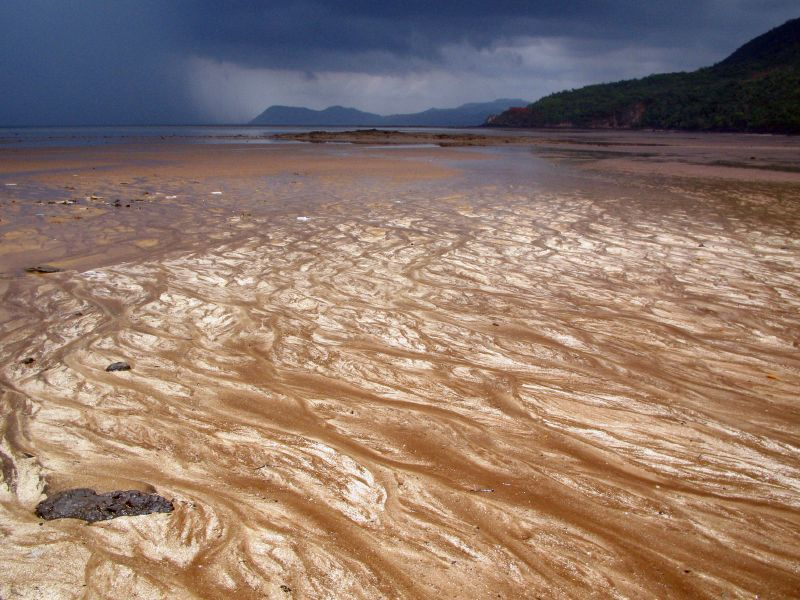

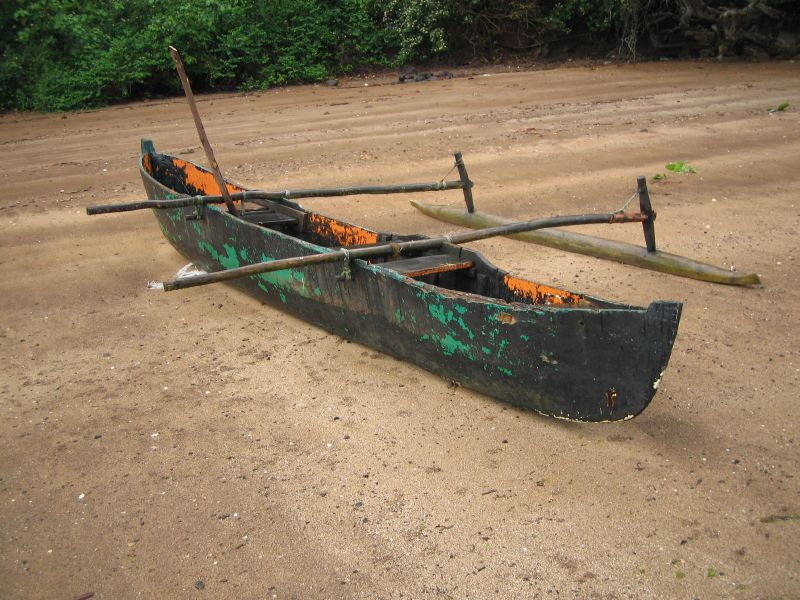
