= M'Tsangamouji =

Commune in Mayotte, France

- Commune
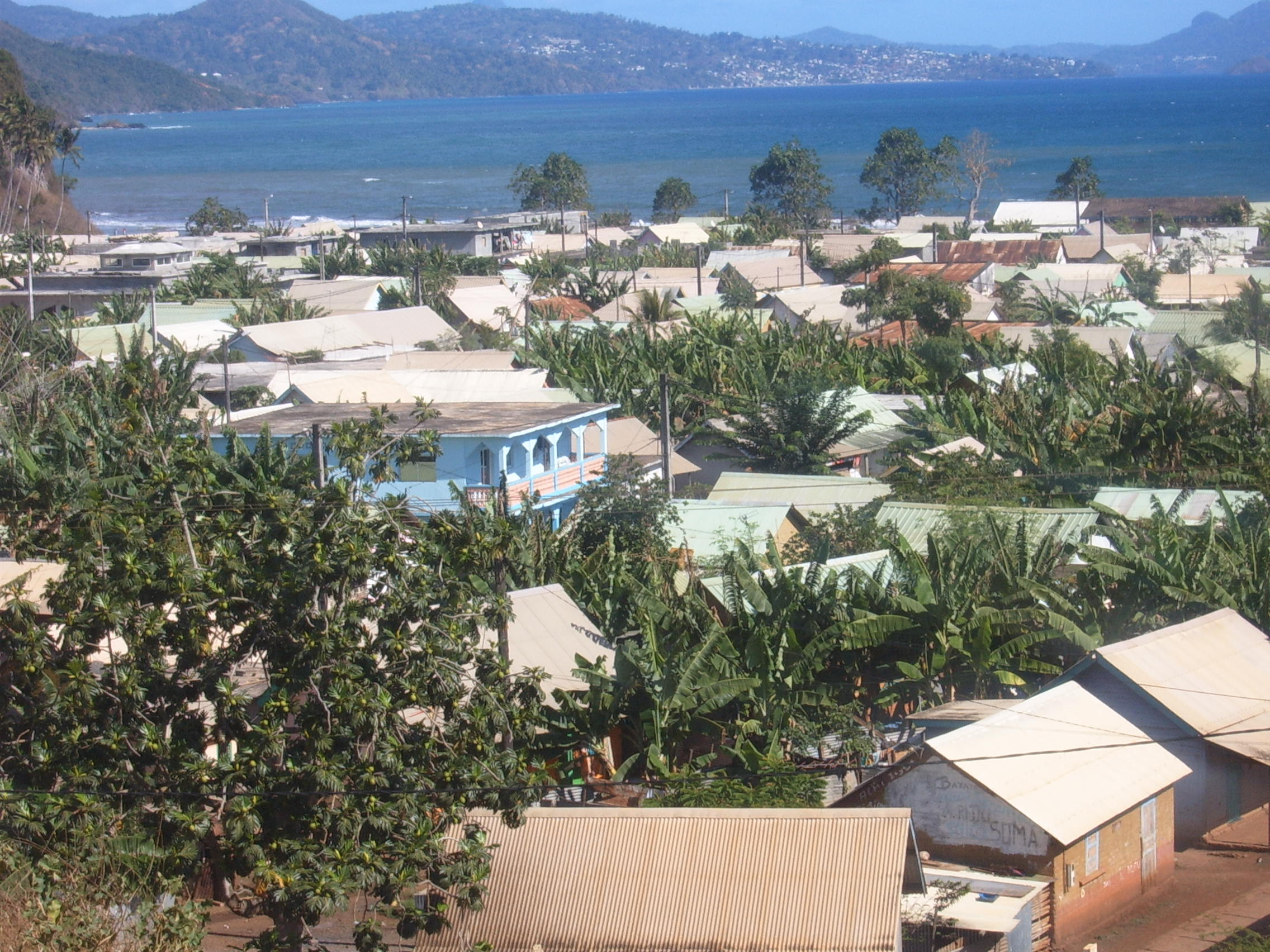
- The centre of M'Tsangamouji

- Coat of arms

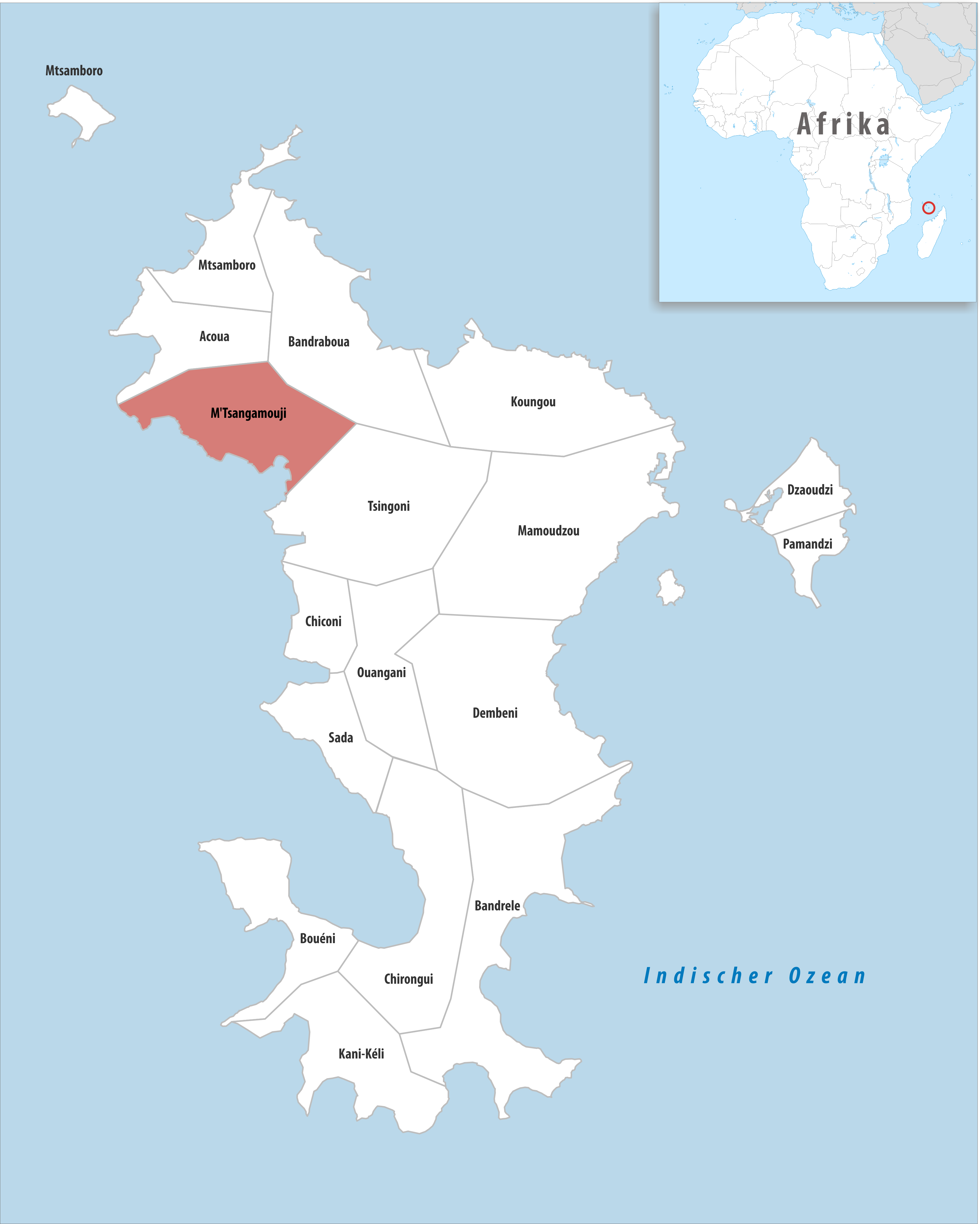
- Location of the commune (in red) within Mayotte
- Location of M'Tsangamouji
- Coordinates: 12°45′35″S 45°04′58″E
- Country: France
- Overseas region and department: Mayotte
- Canton: Tsingoni
- Intercommunality: Centre-Ouest

Government
  - Mayor (2020–2026): Said Maanrifa Ibrahima
- Area^{1}: 22.04 km^{2} (8.51 sq mi)
- Population (2017): 6,432
  - Density: 291.8/km^{2} (755.8/sq mi)
- Time zone: UTC+03:00
- INSEE/Postal code: 97613 /97650
- ^{1} French Land Register data, which excludes lakes, ponds, glaciers > 1 km^{2} (0.386 sq mi or 247 acres) and river estuaries.

M'Tsangamouji (French pronunciation: [mtsɑ̃ɡamuʒi]) is a commune in the French overseas department of Mayotte, in the Indian Ocean.

== Population ==
Historical population
Year	Pop.	±%
2002	5,382	—
2007	5,028	−6.6%
2012	6,314	+25.6%
2017	6,432	+1.9%
