= Acoua =

Commune in Mayotte, France

- Commune
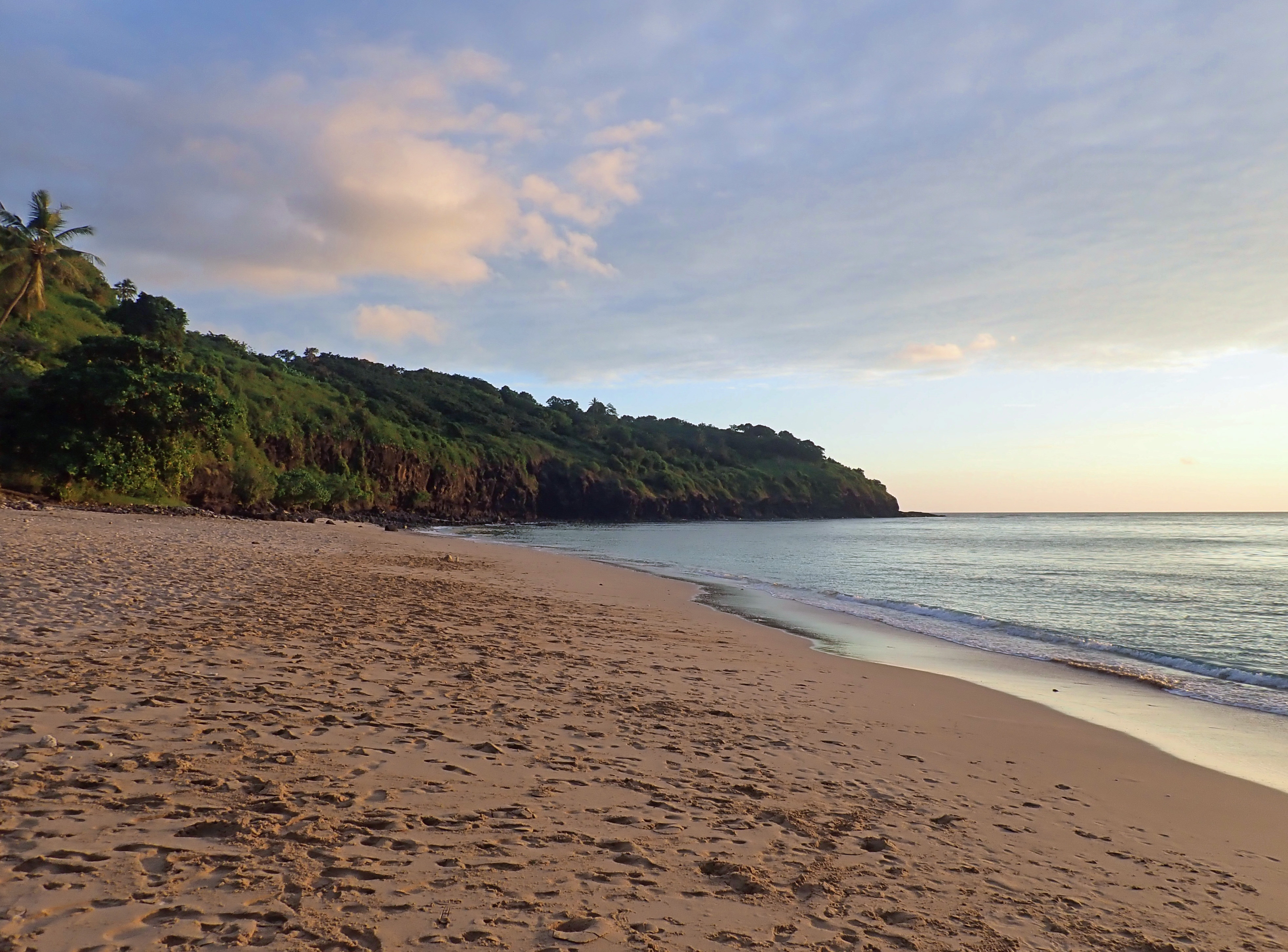
- Mtsanga Fanou beach in Acoua commune

- Coat of arms

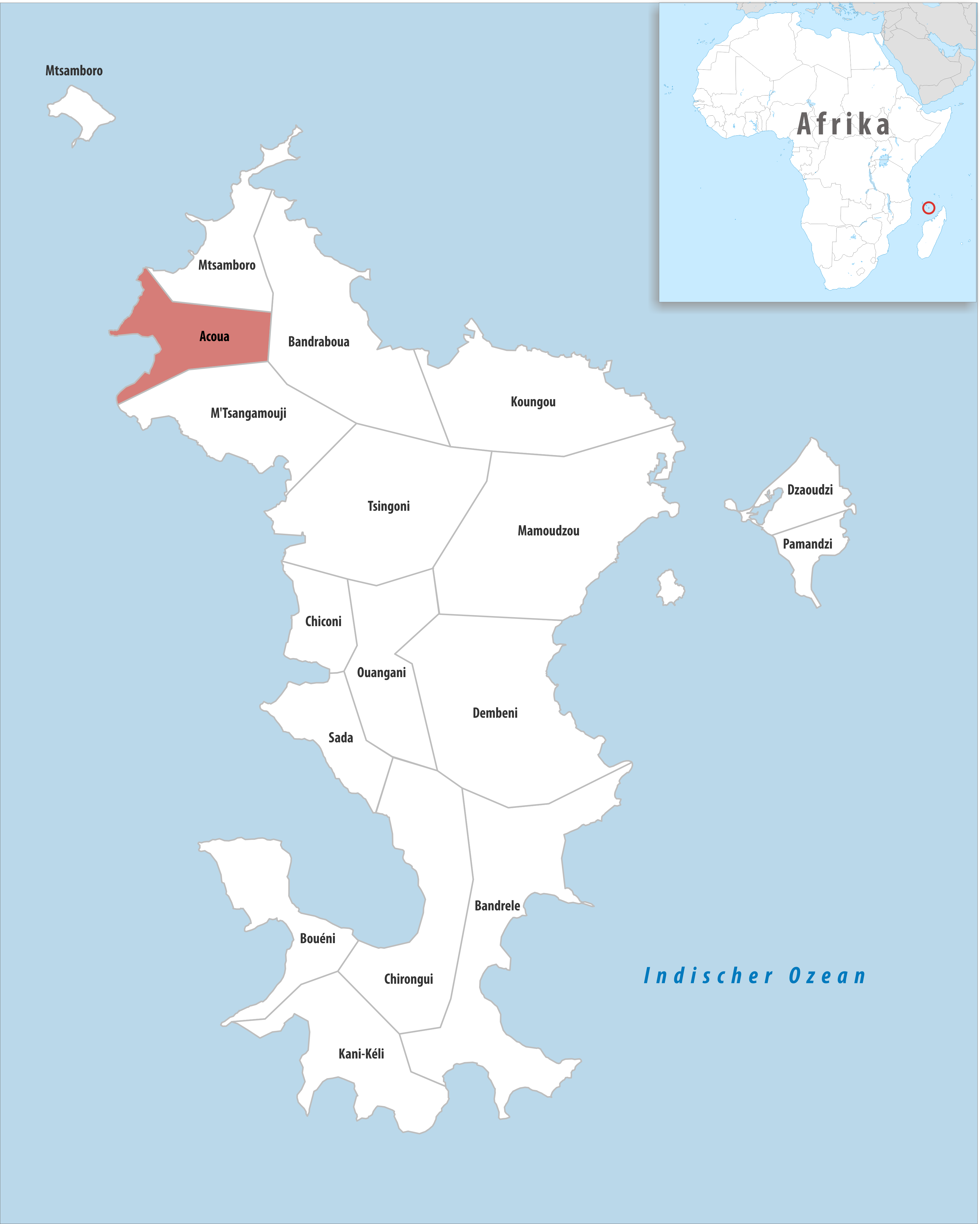
- Location of the commune (in red) within Mayotte
- Location of Acoua
- Location within France
- Coordinates: 12°43′21″S 45°03′23″E
- Country: France
- Overseas region and department: Mayotte
- Canton: Mtsamboro
- Intercommunality: CA Grand Nord de Mayotte

Government
  - Mayor (2020–2026): Marib Hanaffi
- Area^{1}: 13.11 km^{2} (5.06 sq mi)
- Highest elevation: 498 m (1,634 ft)
- Lowest elevation: 0 m (0 ft)
- Population (2017): 5,192
  - Density: 396.0/km^{2} (1,026/sq mi)
- Time zone: UTC+03:00
- INSEE/Postal code: 97601 /97630
- ^{1} French Land Register data, which excludes lakes, ponds, glaciers > 1 km^{2} (0.386 sq mi or 247 acres) and river estuaries.

Acoua (French pronunciation: [akwa]) is a commune in the French overseas department of Mayotte, in the Indian Ocean.

== Population ==
Historical population
Year	Pop.	±%
2002	4,605	—
2007	4,622	+0.4%
2012	4,714	+2.0%
2017	5,192	+10.1%
