= Bandraboua =

Commune in Mayotte, France

- Commune
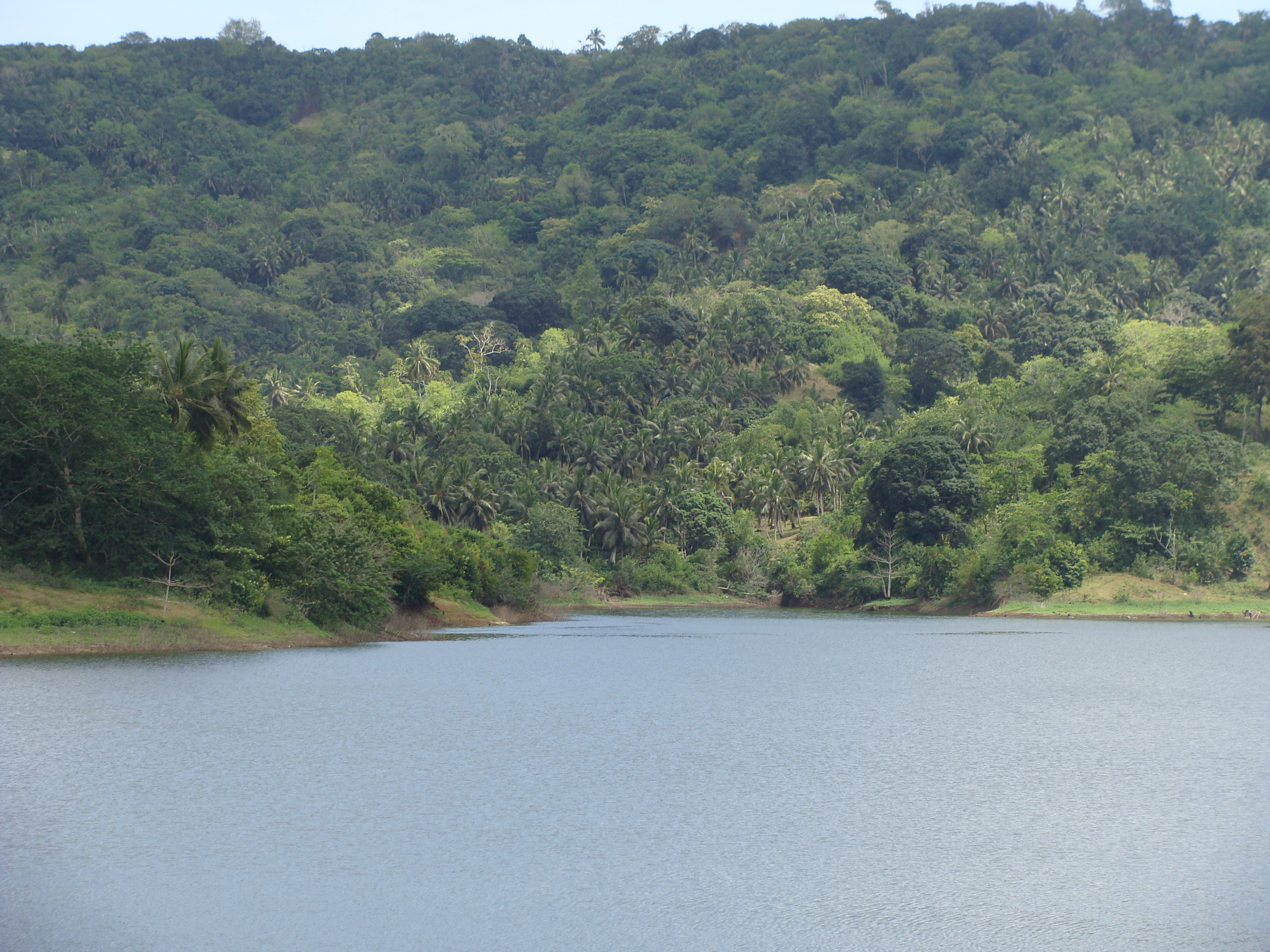

- Coat of arms

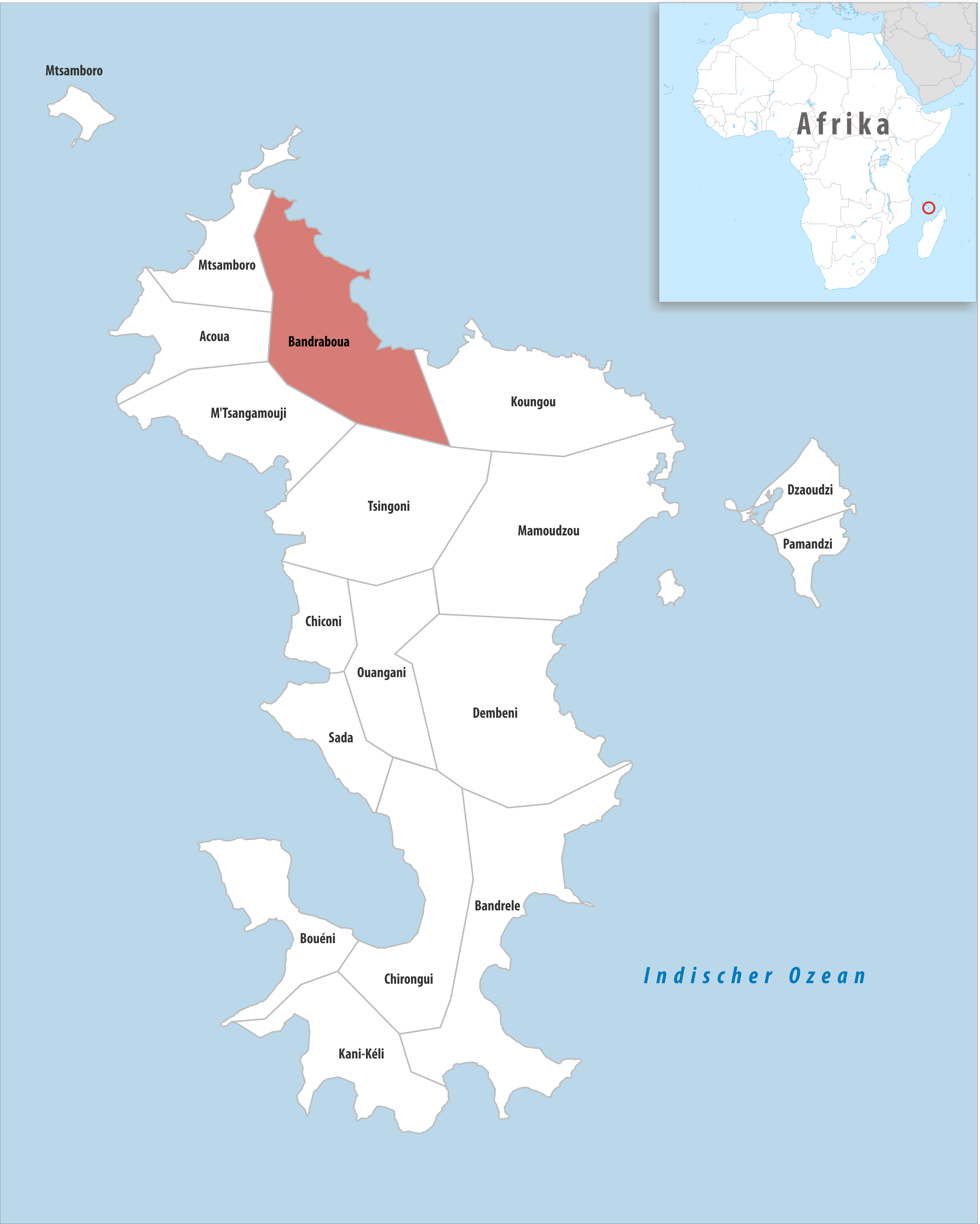
- Location of the commune (in red) within Mayotte
- Location of Bandraboua
- Coordinates: 12°43′31″S 45°06′26″E
- Country: France
- Overseas region and department: Mayotte
- Canton: Bandraboua and Mtsamboro
- Intercommunality: CA Grand Nord de Mayotte

Government
  - Mayor (2020–2026): Ahamada Fahardine
- Area^{1}: 32.11 km^{2} (12.40 sq mi)
- Population (2017): 13,989
  - Density: 435.7/km^{2} (1,128/sq mi)
- Time zone: UTC+03:00
- INSEE/Postal code: 97602 /97650
- ^{1} French Land Register data, which excludes lakes, ponds, glaciers > 1 km^{2} (0.386 sq mi or 247 acres) and river estuaries.

Bandraboua (French pronunciation: [bɑ̃dʁabwa]) is a commune in the French overseas department of Mayotte, in the Indian Ocean.

== Geography ==
The municipality of Boundraboua is located at the northern end of the main island of Mayottes. In addition to the main village of Bandraboua, the villages of Handrema, Mtsangamboua, Dzoumogné and Bouyouni make up the municipality.

== Sugar and rum factory in Dzoumogné ==
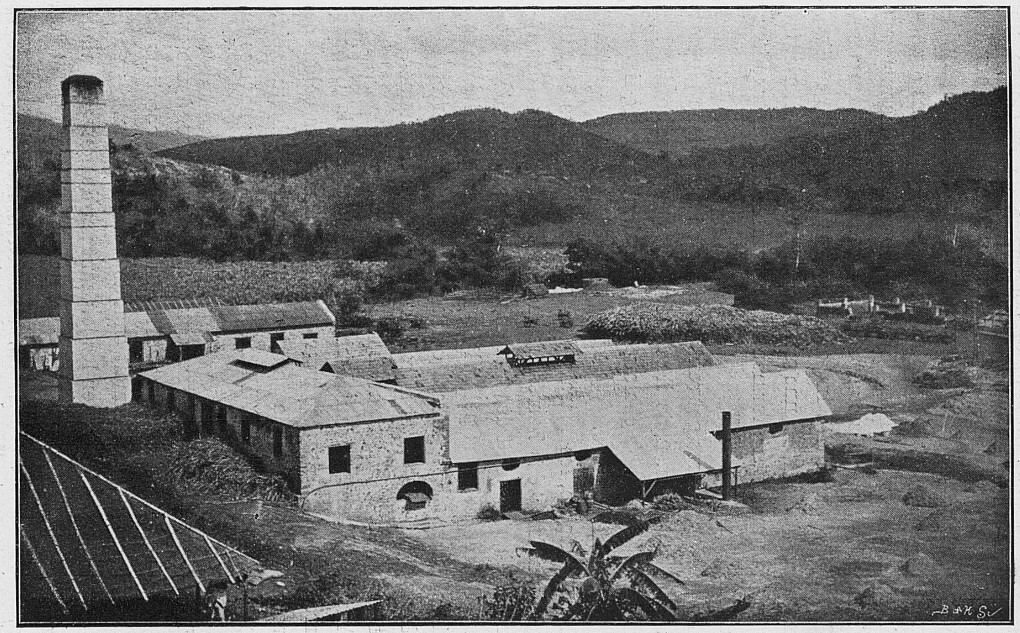
Sugar and rum factory in Dzoumogné, 1900

The sugar and rum factory on a plantation of about 1,500 hectares (3,700 acres) in Dzoumogné belonged to the Cougnac family until the mid-19th century and was taken over by Duperrier in 1864. It had a presumably manually operated Decauville railway. It was 1,720 metres (1.1 mi) long and had a gauge of 500 mm (19 3/4 in). This indicates that it may have been laid by the Société J. F. Cail & Cie as early as 1880, when the factory building was constructed, to transport its steel girders and the steam boilers which had been imported from France. It was later used to ship the sugar and rum to the harbour. Production ceased in 1955.

== Population ==
Historical population

Year	Pop.	±%
1997	6,400	—
2002	7,501	+17.2%

Year	Pop.	±%
2007	9,013	+20.2%
2012	10,132	+12.4%

== Personalities ==
- Warmed Omari (born 23 April 2000), a professional footballer who plays as a defender for Ligue 1 club Rennes.
