= Chirongui =

Commune in Mayotte, France

- Commune
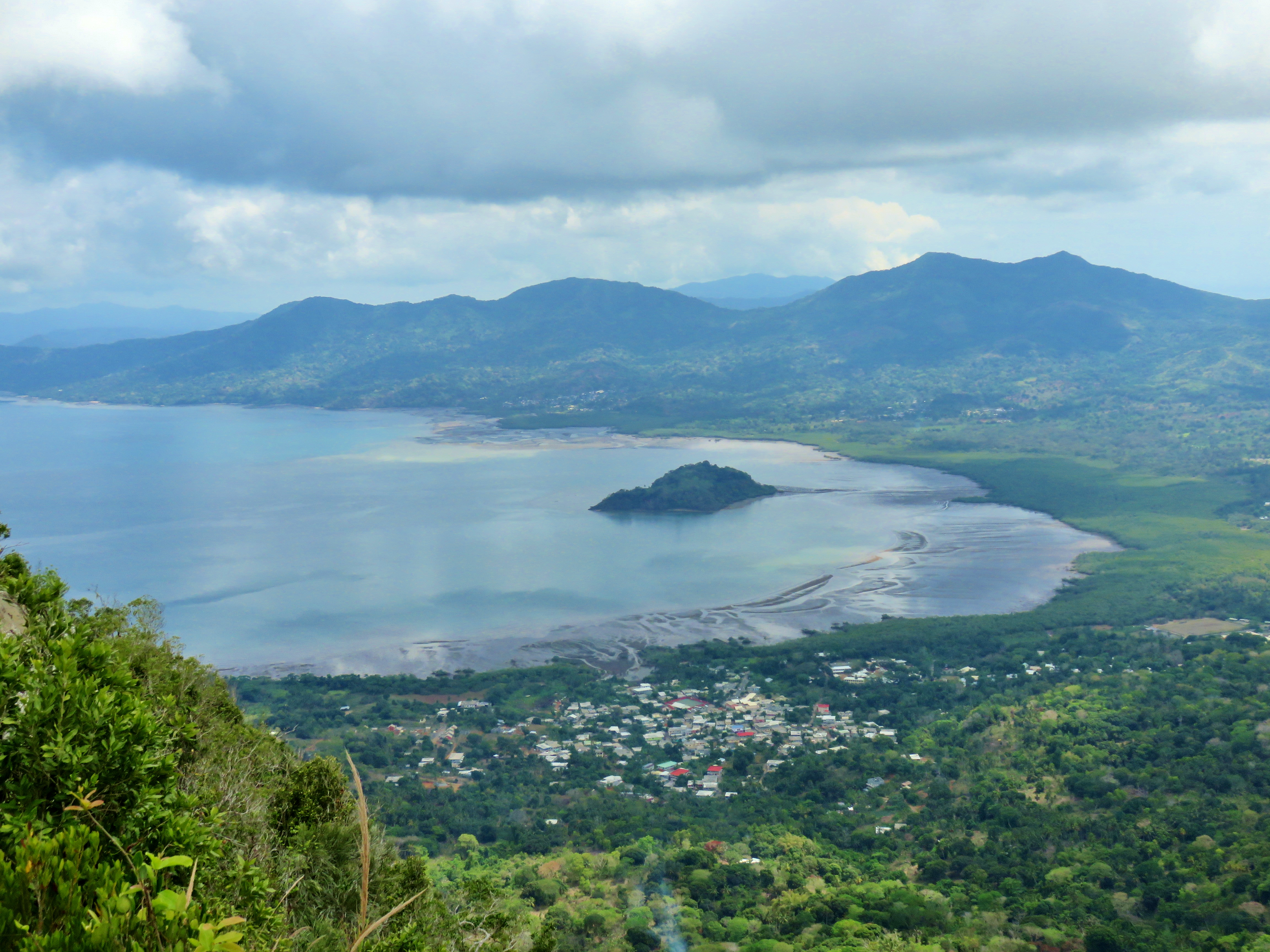

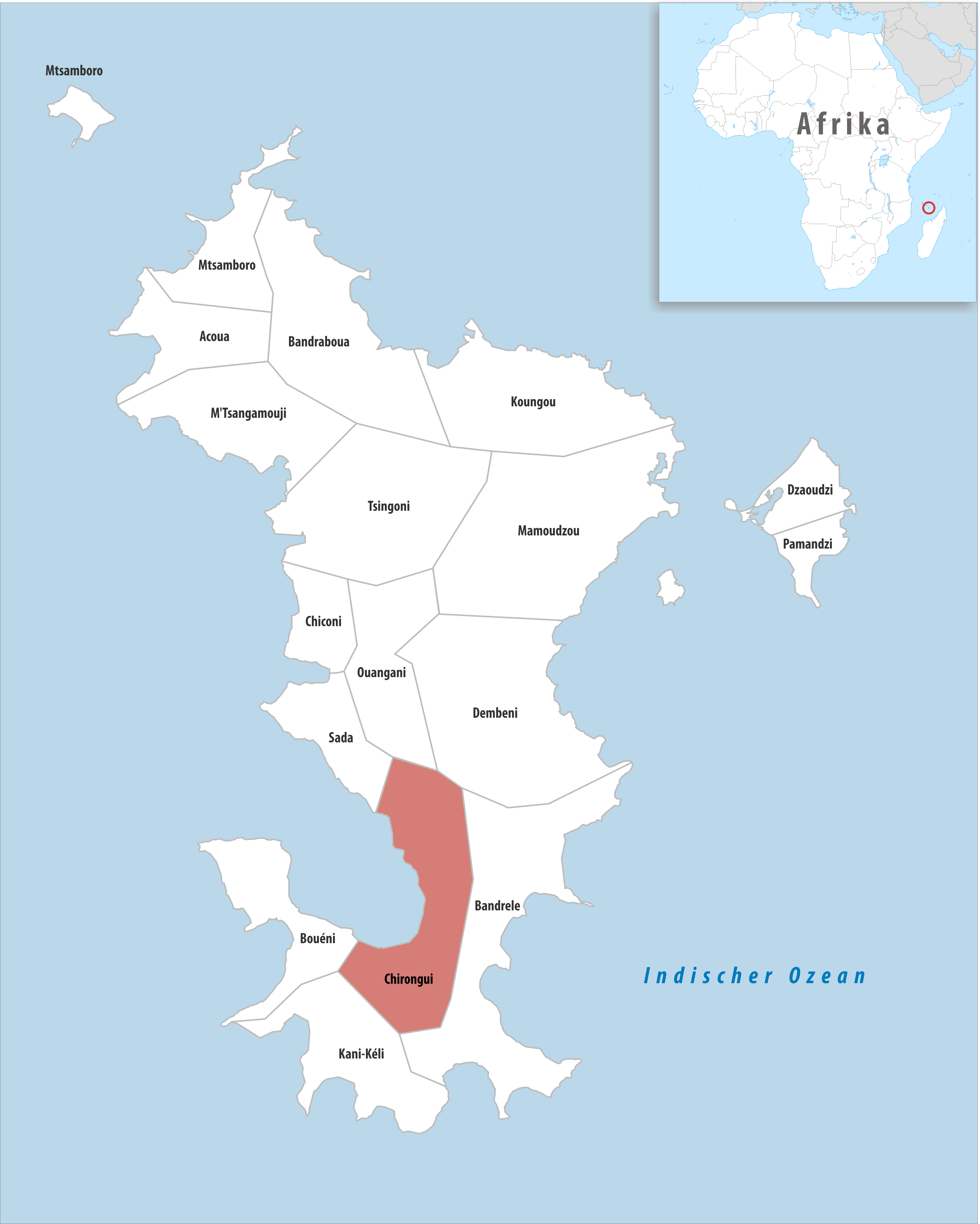
- Location of the commune (in red) within Mayotte
- Location of Chirongui
- Coordinates: 12°56′04″S 45°09′04″E
- Country: France
- Overseas region and department: Mayotte
- Canton: Sada

Government
  - Mayor (2022–2026): Bihaki Daouda
- Area^{1}: 28.76 km^{2} (11.10 sq mi)
- Highest elevation: 660 m (2,170 ft)
- Lowest elevation: 0 m (0 ft)
- Population (2017): 8,920
  - Density: 310/km^{2} (803/sq mi)
- Time zone: UTC+03:00
- INSEE/Postal code: 97606 /97620
- ^{1} French Land Register data, which excludes lakes, ponds, glaciers > 1 km^{2} (0.386 sq mi or 247 acres) and river estuaries.

Chirongui (French pronunciation: [ʃiʁɔ̃ɡi]) is a commune in the French overseas department of Mayotte, in the Indian Ocean.
