= Kani-Kéli =

Commune in Mayotte, France

- Commune
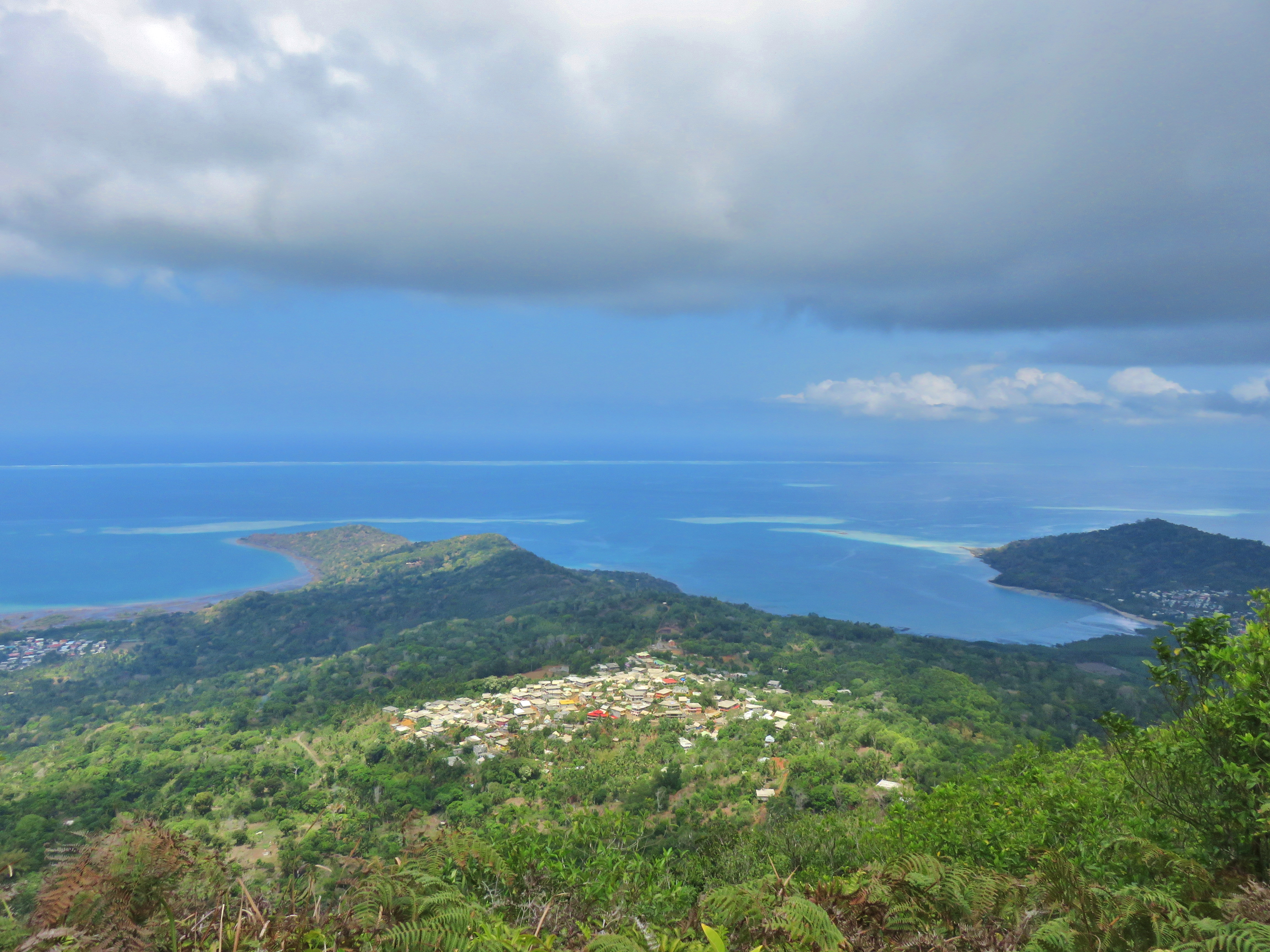

- Coat of arms

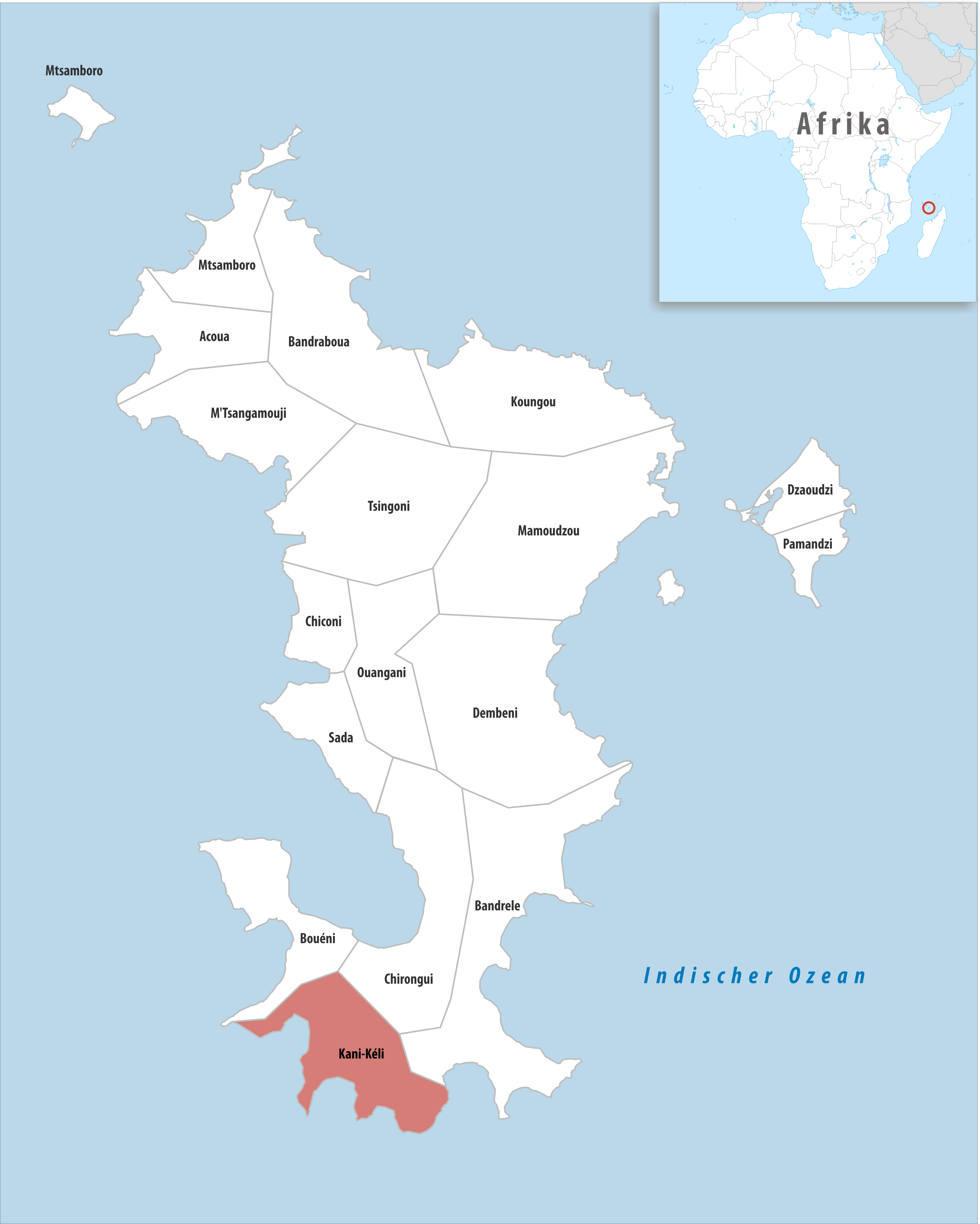
- Location of the commune (in red) within Mayotte
- Location of Kani-Kéli
- Coordinates: 12°57′25″S 45°06′20″E
- Country: France
- Overseas region and department: Mayotte
- Canton: Bouéni
- Intercommunality: Sud

Government
  - Mayor (2021–2026): Abdou Rachadi
- Area^{1}: 20.59 km^{2} (7.95 sq mi)
- Highest elevation: 594 m (1,949 ft)
- Lowest elevation: 0 m (0 ft)
- Population (2017): 5,507
  - Density: 267.5/km^{2} (692.7/sq mi)
- Time zone: UTC+03:00
- INSEE/Postal code: 97609 /97625
- ^{1} French Land Register data, which excludes lakes, ponds, glaciers > 1 km^{2} (0.386 sq mi or 247 acres) and river estuaries.

Kani-Kéli (French pronunciation: [kani keli]) is a commune in the French overseas department of Mayotte, in the Indian Ocean.

== Population ==
Historical population
Year	Pop.	±%
2002	4,336	—
2007	4,527	+4.4%
2012	4,920	+8.7%
2017	5,507	+11.9%
