= Our Lady of Fatima Church, Mamoudzou =

Our Lady of Fatima Church
- Église de Notre Dame de Fatima
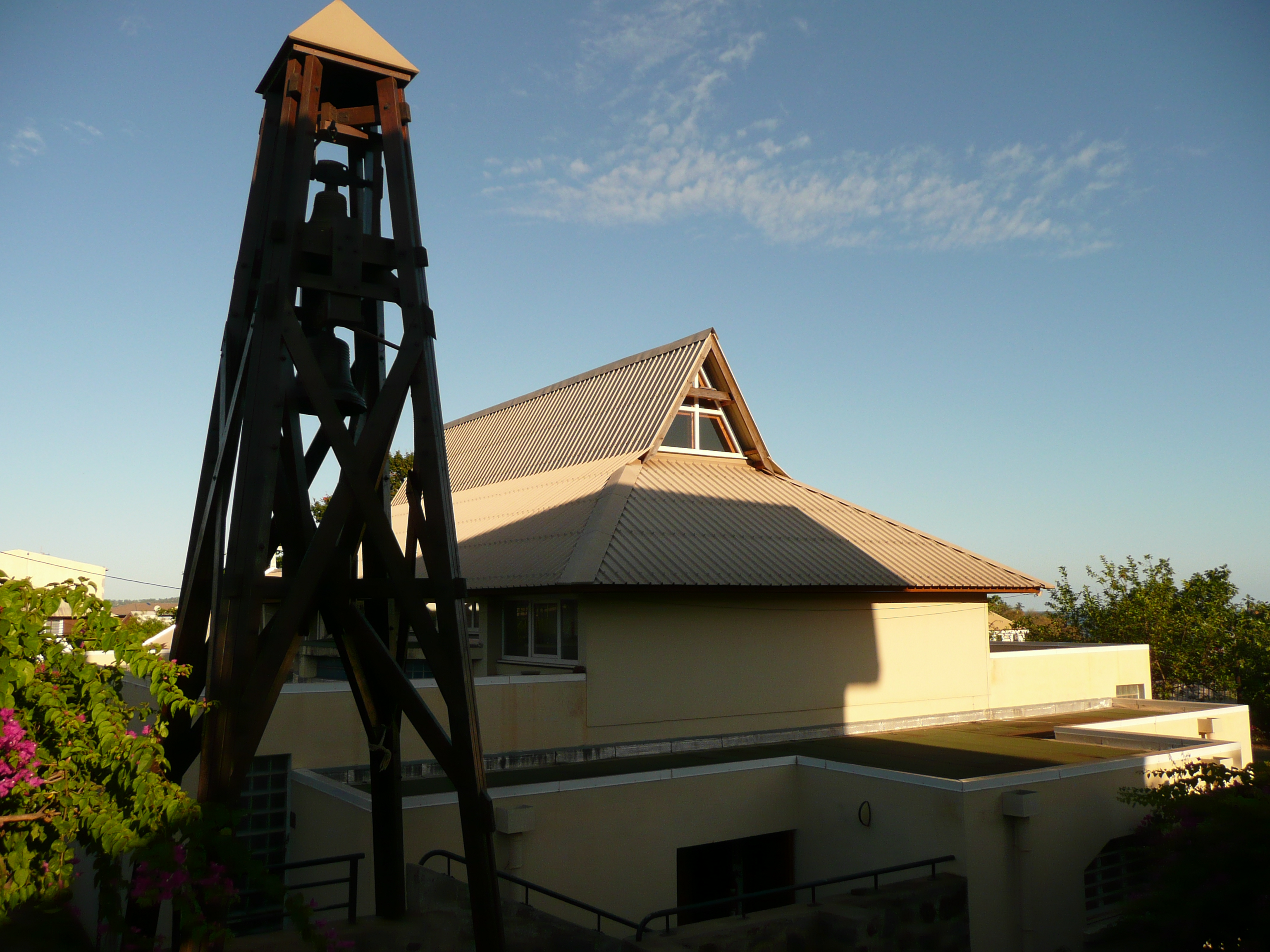

- Location in Mayotte
- 12.7799°S 45.2309°E
- Location: Mamoudzou, Mayotte
- Country: France
- Denomination: Roman Catholic Church

History
- Dedication: Our Lady of Fatima

Administration
- Diocese: Apostolic Vicariate of the Comoros Archipelago

The Our Lady of Fatima Church (French: Église de Notre Dame de Fatima) is a religious building affiliated with the Catholic Church and is located in the town of Mamoudzou, the capital of the French overseas department of Mayotte in the Indian Ocean and its most populous commune.

The cathedral, dating from 1957, follows the Roman or Latin rite and is within the Apostolic Vicariate of the Comoros Archipelago (Apostolicus Vicariatus Insularum Comorensium or Vicariat apostolique de l'archipel des Comores) which was raised to its current status in 2010 by Pope Benedict XVI through the bull "Divini Salvatoris".

As its name indicates, the cathedral is dedicated to the Virgin Mary in her title of Our Lady of Fatima.

== See also ==
- Roman Catholicism in Mayotte
