= Hôtel de Ville, Mamoudzou =

Town hall in Mamoudzou, France

Hôtel de Ville
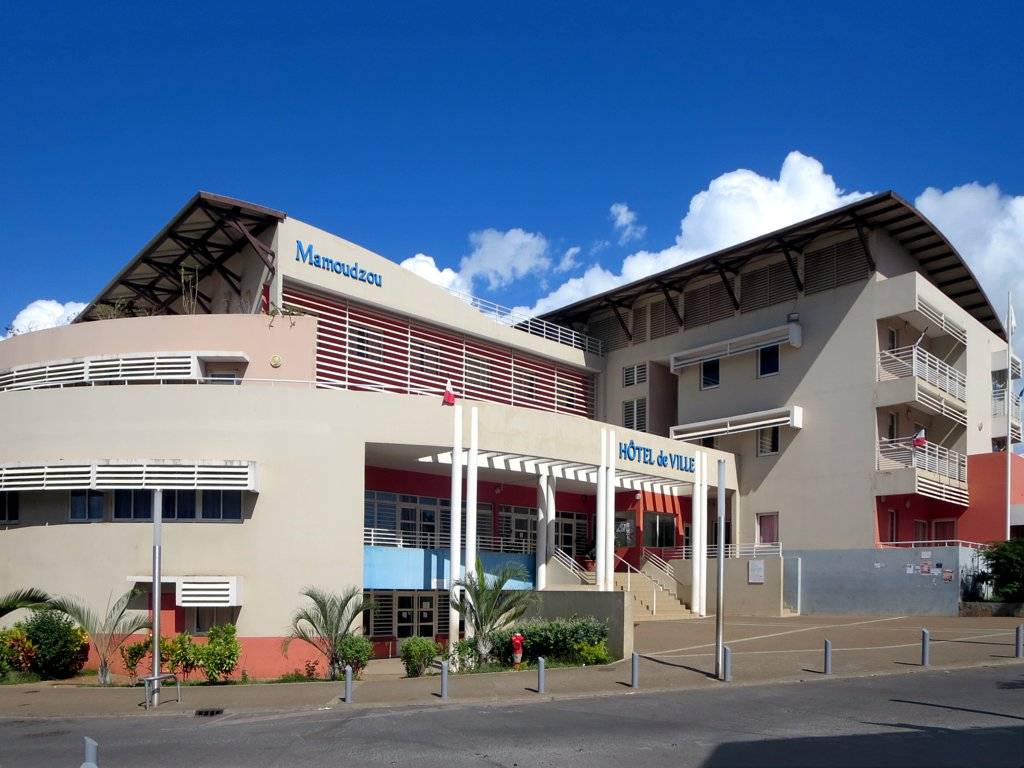
- The main frontage of the Hôtel de Ville in September 2013
- Interactive map of the Hôtel de Ville area

General information
- Type: City hall
- Architectural style: Modern style
- Location: Mamoudzou, France
- Coordinates: 12.7807°S 45.2324°E
- Completed: 2009

The Hôtel de Ville (French pronunciation: [otɛl də vil], City Hall) is a municipal building in Mamoudzou, Mayotte, in the Indian Ocean, standing on Boulevard Halidi Sélémani.

== History ==
Following the decision of Mayotte to remain with France, notwithstanding the unilateral declaration of independence of the Comoros islands in 1975, Mamoudzou was redeveloped and expanded in response to significant population growth. In this context, the town council decided to commission a new town hall, to bring all services together in one building, on the site of an earlier town hall. Construction of the new building started in 2006. It was designed in the modern style, built in concrete and steel and was officially opened by the Prime Minister of France, François Fillon, on 13 July 2009. Celebrations to mark the event included a ball, held that evening, with the Malagasy artist, Fandrama, leading the entertainment.

The design of the new building involved an asymmetrical main frontage facing onto Boulevard Halidi Sélémani. The layout involved two separate sections: a curved section with a long concrete wall to the southeast and a taller rectangular block with a curved roof to the northwest. The main entrance was in the curved section, at the northeast point of the wall, and was accessed by a short flight of steps leading up to a glass doorway within a two-storey recess formed by three pairs of columns supporting a parapet. Internally, the principal room was the Salle du Conseil (council chamber).

In May 2023, the council announced that some services, including planning, housing and the environment, would relocate from the town hall into new premises on Rue Said Soimihi, and in August 2023, Mamoudzou succeeded the much smaller town of Dzaoudzi as the capital of Mayotte, with the town hall becoming the local seat of government of the capital.

The Minister of the Overseas of France, Marie Guévenoux, met with the mayor, Ambdilwahedou Soumaila, at the town hall and was briefed on new systems for registering births and deaths, during a tour of Mayotte in May 2024. Cyclone Chido caused some damage to the town hall when it reached Mayotte in December 2024.
