= Cantons of the Mayotte department =

The following is a list of the 13 cantons of the Mayotte department, in France, following the French canton reorganisation which came into effect in March 2015:

- Bandraboua
- Bouéni
- Dembeni
- Dzaoudzi
- Koungou
- Mamoudzou-1
- Mamoudzou-2
- Mamoudzou-3
- Mtsamboro
- Ouangani
- Pamandzi
- Sada
- Tsingoni
