= Passamainty =

Coordinates: 12°48′4″S 45°12′32″E

Passamainty, or Passamaïnti, is a village in the commune of Mamoudzou on Mayotte.
