= Manou Mansour =

French poet

Ben-Ousséni Mansour, alias Manou Mansour (Mamoudzou, Mayotte, 24 February 1980) is a French poet.

He is the eldest of nine children of Ousséni Mansour (nurse) and Amina Angatahi (housewife). He grew up in the south of Mayotte island, in Bouéni.

== Works ==
- Lettres mahoraises (2008)
- L'auberge mahoraise (2009)
- Odes à l'homme perverti (2009)
- La Poésie en soi-Amante du Poète (2010)
- Ravi que le temps ait juste un peu rouillé mes terres (2012)
- Le droit de renaître (2012)

== References and external links ==
- (in French) www.babelio.com
