= Cyclone Chido =

South-West Indian Ocean cyclone in 2024

Intense Tropical Cyclone Chido
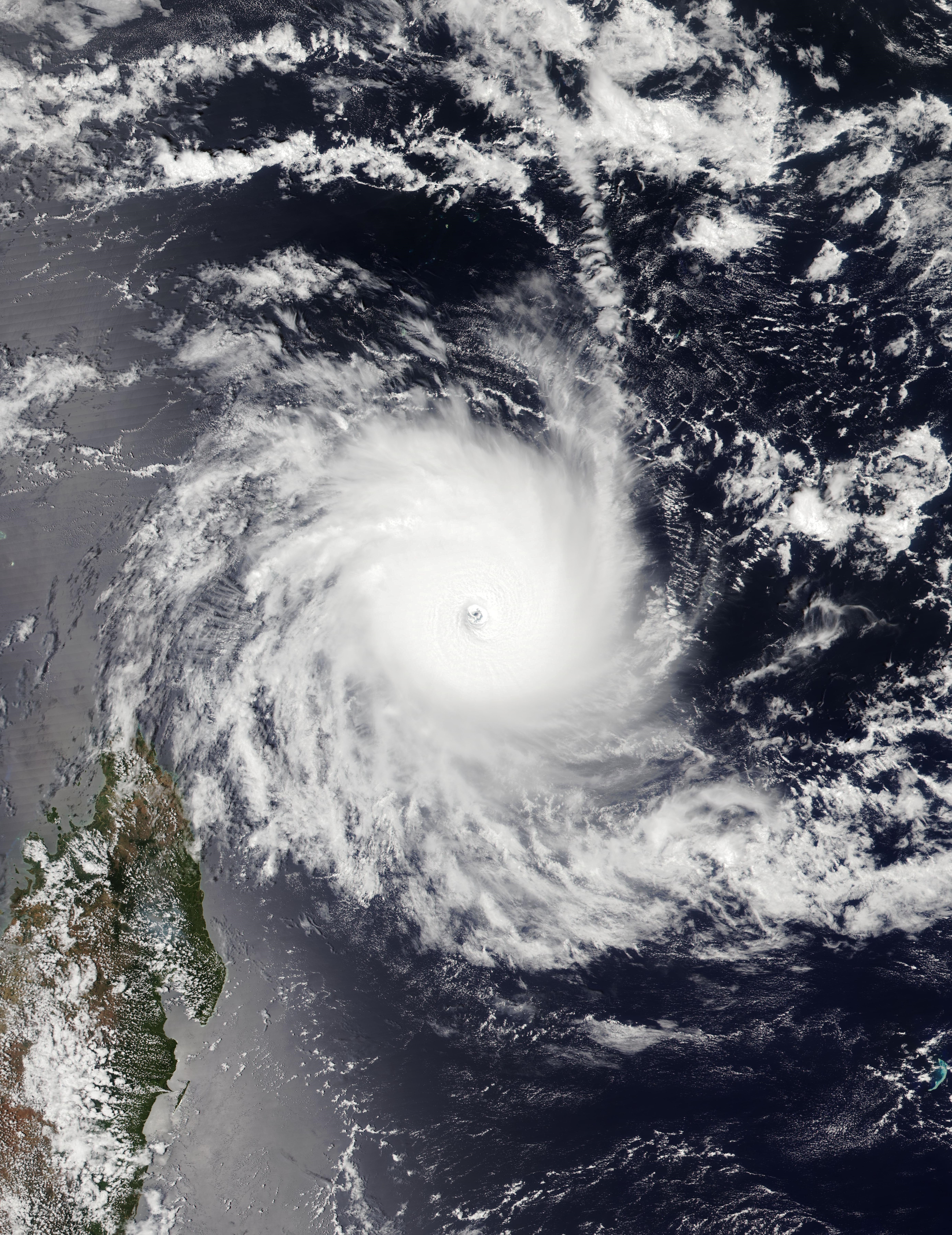
- Cyclone Chido at peak intensity on 12 December

Meteorological history
- Formed: 5 December 2024
- Dissipated: 16 December 2024

Intense tropical cyclone
- 10-minute sustained (MFR)
- Highest winds: 215 km/h (130 mph)
- Lowest pressure: 935 hPa (mbar); 27.61 inHg

Category 5-equivalent tropical cyclone
- 1-minute sustained (SSHWS/JTWC)
- Highest winds: 260 km/h (160 mph)
- Lowest pressure: 925 hPa (mbar); 27.32 inHg

Overall effects
- Fatalities: 173
- Injuries: 5,194
- Missing: 41
- Damage: $3.9 billion (2024 USD) (Costliest tropical cyclone in the South-West Indian Ocean basin)
- Areas affected: Mauritius (particularly Agaléga); Seychelles (particularly Farquhar); northern Madagascar; French Southern and Antarctic Lands (particularly the Glorioso Islands); Mayotte; Comoros; Mozambique; Malawi
- IBTrACS
- Part of the 2024–25 South-West Indian Ocean cyclone season

Intense Tropical Cyclone Chido was a compact but very powerful, destructive, and deadly tropical cyclone which impacted Southeast Africa in December 2024. Chido, which means a desire in Shona, was the third named storm and the second intense tropical cyclone of the 2024–25 South-West Indian Ocean cyclone season. It became the strongest tropical cyclone to affect Agaléga since Cyclone Andry in 1983, and the most powerful storm to strike Mayotte in at least 90 years. It is also the costliest tropical cyclone on record in the South-West Indian Ocean basin, surpassing Cyclone Idai of 2019.

Chido originated from an elongated circulation that the Météo-France office in Réunion (RSMC La Réunion) began monitoring on 7 December, located east of Diego Garcia. In the post-storm analysis, it was indicated that the storm had already begun forming as a zone of disturbed weather on 5 December. On 11 December, Chido rapidly deepened and intensified into an intense tropical cyclone within twelve hours, with its eye passing over Agaléga. Early the next day, the United States Joint Typhoon Warning Center (JTWC) upgraded the system to a Category 4-equivalent tropical cyclone, with estimated 1-minute maximum sustained winds of 250 km/h (155 mph), while the MFR estimated its peak intensity with a minimum central pressure of 935 hPa (27.61 inHg) and 10-minute maximum sustained winds of 215 km/h (130 mph) as it maintained its small size and moved westwards. As the system passed off the northern tip of Madagascar, the eye briefly cleared and the central dense overcast remained compact and symmetrical. Chido entered the Mozambique Channel on 14 December, with microwave imagery showing highly developed organized bands of deep convection. Satellite imagery showed cooling cloud tops surrounding a clearing eye, indicating the strengthening of the storm, and on 15 December, Chido made landfall in Pemba, Mozambique, with 10-minute sustained winds estimated at 205 km/h (125 mph). Shortly after landfall, the MFR reported that Chido moved through Mozambique and Malawi, with convective activity gradually weakening. On 16 December, Chido degenerated into an overland depression, and the MFR issued its final advisory on the system.

The deaths of at least 173 people are attributed to Chido; 120 in Mozambique, 40 in Mayotte and 13 in Malawi, along with over 5,194 injuries. Agaléga was significantly affected by Chido, with over 95% of the territory's buildings destroyed. Little was done to prepare for the storm in Mayotte, which experienced catastrophic damage and a heavily debated number of deaths and missing from Chido. Numerous residents were unaccounted for, with most shanty towns completely destroyed and 85% of the island being left without power by 16 December. In Mozambique, over 155,500 homes were badly affected and entire communities were destroyed. Relatively minor damage also occurred in the Comoros and Madagascar. Economic losses from Chido reached $3.9 billion, making it the costliest tropical cyclone in the South-West Indian Ocean basin.

== Meteorological history ==
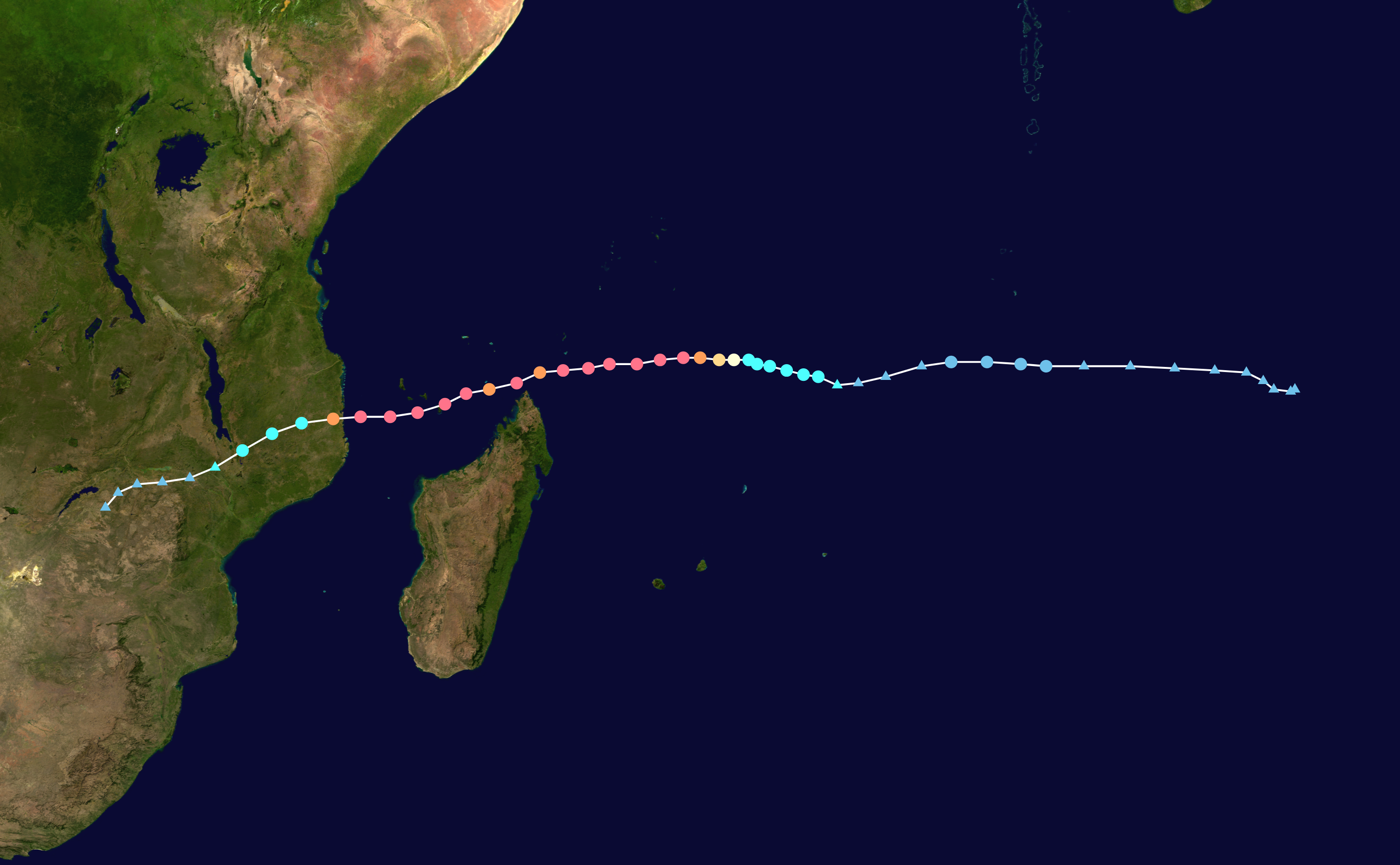
Map plotting the storm's track and intensity, according to the Saffir–Simpson scale Map key Saffir–Simpson scale Tropical depression (≤38 mph, ≤62 km/h) Tropical storm (39–73 mph, 63–118 km/h) Category 1 (74–95 mph, 119–153 km/h) Category 2 (96–110 mph, 154–177 km/h) Category 3 (111–129 mph, 178–208 km/h) Category 4 (130–156 mph, 209–251 km/h) Category 5 (≥157 mph, ≥252 km/h) Unknown Storm type Tropical cyclone Subtropical cyclone Extratropical cyclone, remnant low, tropical disturbance, or monsoon depression

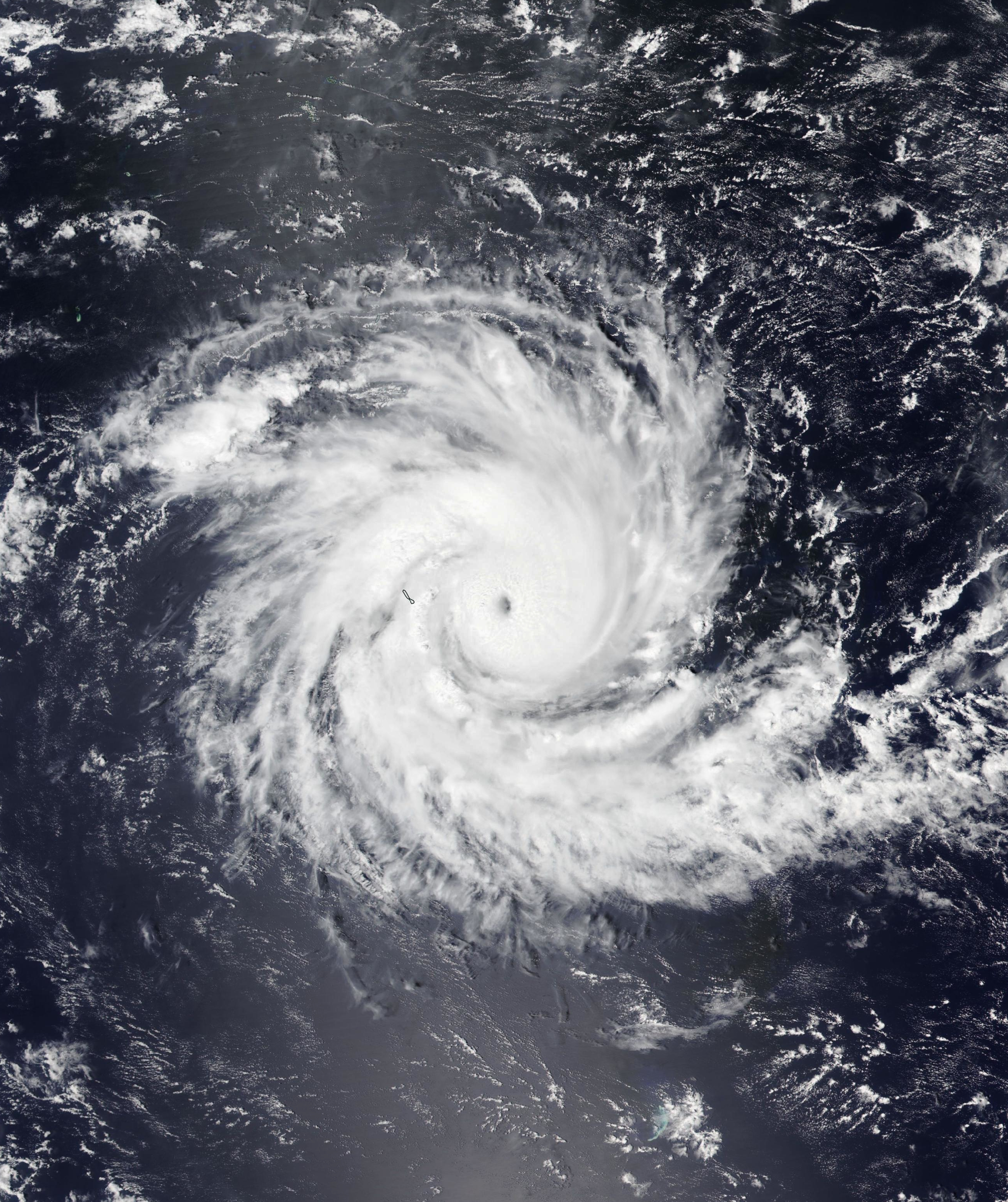
Cyclone Chido approaching Agalega Islands on 11 December

Cyclone Chido originated from an elongated circulation that the Météo-France office in Réunion (MFR) (Note: Météo-France's meteorological office in Réunion (RSMC La Réunion) is the official Regional Specialized Meteorological Center for the South-West Indian Ocean, tracking all tropical cyclones south of the equator, from the east coast of Africa to 90° E.) began monitoring on 7 December, located east of Diego Garcia. In the post-storm analysis, it was indicated that the storm had already begun forming as a zone of disturbed weather on 5 December. On 8 December, at 08:00 UTC, the United States Joint Typhoon Warning Center (JTWC) (Note: The Joint Typhoon Warning Center is a joint United States Navy – United States Air Force task force that issues tropical cyclone warnings for the Indian Ocean and other regions.) issued a tropical cyclone formation alert, noting a consolidating low-level circulation center and a favorable environment with low wind shear and sea surface temperatures exceeding 28–29 °C (82–84 °F). The following day, the JTWC began issuing warnings for the system, classifying it as Tropical Cyclone 04S, as satellite imagery showed a partially exposed low-level circulation center on the eastern side of a developing burst of deep convection, which was nearly circular in shape and had cloud tops cooler than −80 °C (−112 °F). At 00:00 UTC on 10 December, the MFR reported that the system had intensified into a moderate tropical storm, with the Mauritius Meteorological Services naming it Chido, as convection strongly increased around the center of the system, accompanied by cooling of cloud tops and an expansion of the central dense overcast (CDO). (Note: The Sub-Regional Tropical Cyclone Advisory Center (Mauritius Meteorological Services) in Mauritius names a storm if the system intensifies into a moderate tropical storm between 55° E and 90° E.) The cyclone moved westward, and the MFR reported that it quickly intensified into a severe tropical storm around 12:00 UTC that day, citing the Dvorak technique—a method used to determine a tropical cyclone's intensity based on its satellite appearance. On the subsequent day, Chido significantly improved in organization, with satellite imagery showing a newly developed eye feature, an increasingly symmetric structure, and curved convective banding wrapping around the system. As a result, MFR upgraded it to a tropical cyclone, and the JTWC followed suit.

Chido rapidly deepened and intensified into an intense tropical cyclone within twelve hours, with its eye passing over Agalega and bringing extreme conditions to the island, where a minimum pressure of 980 hPa (28.94 inHg) was recorded. This made Chido the strongest tropical cyclone to directly affect the island since Cyclone Andry in 1983. Early the next day, the JTWC upgraded the system to a Category 4-equivalent tropical cyclone, with estimated 1-minute maximum sustained winds of 250 km/h (155 mph), while the MFR estimated its peak intensity with a minimum central pressure of 935 hPa (27.61 inHg) and 10-minute maximum sustained winds of 215 km/h (130 mph) as it maintained its small size and moved westwards. After reaching its peak intensity, the cyclone's eye, which was 13.8 miles (22.2 km) wide, became cloud-filled and increasingly ragged, and on 13 December, an eyewall replacement cycle occurred, causing the storm to weaken. As the system passed about 35 nautical miles (64.8 km) off the northern tip of Madagascar, the eye briefly cleared and the CDO remained compact and symmetrical. Chido entered the Mozambique Channel on 14 December, with microwave imagery showing highly developed organized bands of deep convection. As it neared Mayotte, it quickly re-intensified, with Pamandzi Airport recording a maximum gust of 226 km/h (140 mph), setting an all-time record for the station, and a minimum pressure of 982 hPa (29.00 inHg), breaking the previous record of 985 hPa (29.09 inHg) set during Cyclone Kamisy in 1984. Additionally, the MFR reported that it was the strongest storm to strike Mayotte in at least 90 years. Satellite imagery showed cooling cloud tops surrounding a clearing eye, indicating the strengthening of the storm, and at 06:00 UTC on 15 December, Chido made landfall on Pemba in Mozambique, with 10-minute sustained winds estimated at 205 km/h (125 mph). Shortly after landfall, the JTWC discontinued warnings, and the MFR reported that Chido moved through Mozambique and Malawi, with convective activity gradually weakening. On 16 December, Chido degenerated into an overland depression, and the MFR issued its final advisory on the system.

== Preparations ==
ECDM map showing projected rainfall from Chido

=== Mauritius and Madagascar ===
In Agaléga, residents sought refuge at an airport terminal.

In Madagascar, officials said that although damage from Chido would likely be minor, due to the characteristics of the cyclone and the capacity of the area expected to be affected, access to the north of the island would be challenging as national roads were still damaged from previous cyclones. However, the National Office for Risk and Catastrophe Management (BNGRC) deployed food stocks to northern Madagascar, in addition to the stocks already available through partners. UNICEF planned to mobilize a United Nations Humanitarian Air Service (UNHAS) flight to preposition items in the north where stock levels are relatively low. OCHA, in support of BNGRC, conducted a refresher training on aerial and rapid multi-sector needs assessment for about 40 inter-agency teams, which would be mobilized at any time if a post-cyclone assessment was needed. Madagascar Red Cross branches were alerted, disaster response teams were identified and early warning system (EWS) equipment was deployed. Humanitarian partners continued to monitor the situation to assess required support. Three teams of BNGRC were deployed to Antsiranana, Vohemar and Ambilobe to support anticipatory actions conducted at a local level including preventive evacuations. The Red Cross also carried out awareness-raising campaigns in Sava and Sofia Regions through its crisis modifier window.

=== Comoros and Mayotte ===
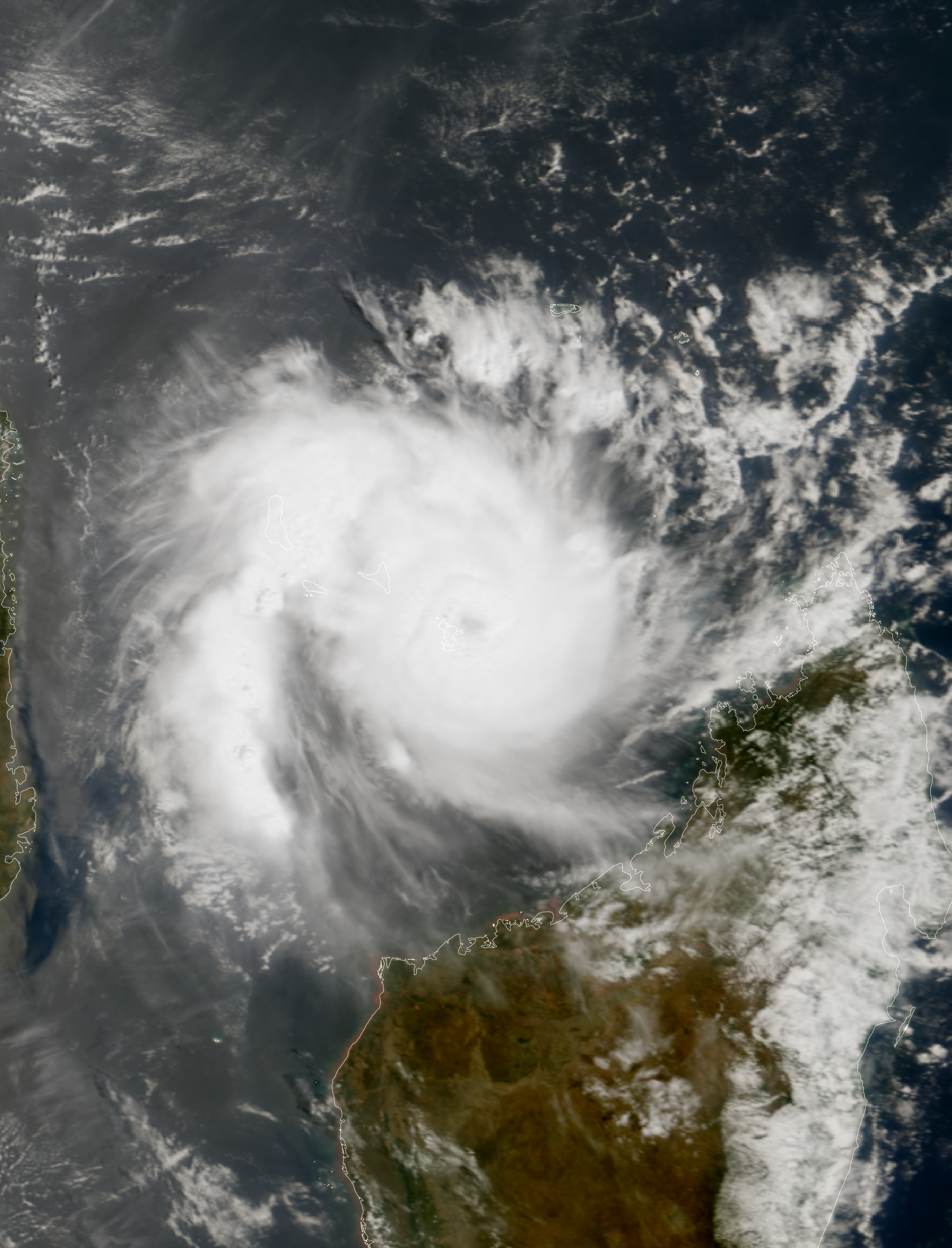
Chido making landfall in Mayotte on 14 December

On 13 December, Météo-France issued a red alert for Mayotte, before revising the alert level to purple the following day. However, most residents of the island ignored the warnings in the 24 hours before the storm hit, underestimating its severity. Some chose to remain in their homes out of fear that they may be looted, while others avoided shelters out of fear of deportation, as about a third of residents in Mayotte are undocumented migrants. Meteorological officials in the Comoros issued an orange weather alert that would be issued on 13 December. On that day, the Direction Générale de la Sécurité Civile (DGSC) decreed the official activation of the Cyclone-induced Flood Rescue Plan and the national emergency operational centre would help monitor the storm's effects. The Comorian Red Cross in Anjouan and Mohéli were confined during the cyclone's passing. Residents were also advised to follow forecasts through their national meteorological service. Prince Said Ibrahim International Airport was closed from 13 to 16 December.

=== Southern Africa ===
The United Nations Office for the Coordination of Humanitarian Affairs (OCHA) said that over 1.7 million people in Mozambique could be affected by winds exceeding 120 km/h (75 mph), and that the cyclone may exacerbate a cholera outbreak affecting the country. The Mozambique National Institute of Meteorology issued red alerts for Cabo Delgado and Nampula Provinces and recommended that all civilians must take precautionary and safety measures. The Mozambique Red Cross Society and World Food Programme implemented anticipatory actions following the activation by the Technical Council for Disaster Management for Mogincual and Angoche Districts. Partners also conducted an assessment mission in Cabo Delgado, visiting accommodation sites to provide inputs in the updated list of accommodation centers.

The Department of Climate Change and Meteorological Services (DCCMS) in Malawi issued a warning for 15 districts expected to be in the path of Chido. Possibilities of flooding, dangerous winds and infrastructure damage were forecast along with the possibility for some districts to receive more than 50 mm (2.0 in) of rain within 24 hours from the storm. On 14 December, the DoDMA agreed to set up a centralised Emergency Operation Centre (EOC) in Blantyre and that it would remain operational from 15 December. The country's government initiated the district response coordination mechanism to scale up the preparedness efforts. All response sectors, including the drone team, were activated and are in progress of prepositioning key response stocks in strategic areas in southern Malawi.

Authorities in Zimbabwe said that Chido was likely to affect the country by 17 December, with heavy rainfall, flooding and landslides likely. OCHA also reported that Chido may exacerbate rainfall in Angola, Botswana, the Democratic Republic of the Congo, Eswatini, Tanzania and South Africa.

== Impact ==
Casualties by country
Countries	Fatalities	Missing	Injuries	Damage (USD)
Agalega (Mauritius)	0	0	0	Unknown
Madagascar	0	0	0	Minimal
Mayotte (France)	40	41	4,260	€450 million
Comoros	0	0	5	Unknown
Mozambique	120	Unknown	900	>$5.95 million
Malawi	13	Unknown	29	Unknown
Total	173	41	5,194	>$526 million

=== Mauritius and Madagascar ===
Chido was the strongest storm to strike Agaléga since 1983. North Agaléga was reportedly "devastated" by Chido, with strong gusts and 8 m (26 ft) waves destroying 95% of the island's buildings, including a hospital, while 98% of structures were decimated at South Agaléga. Communications were cut off following the passage of the eye overnight from 11–12 December. A tugboat ran aground in the reefs just north of the islands, sparking concerns of a possible oil spill.

In Madagascar, minor damage, mild flooding and power outages were reported in Antsiranana. Multiple other districts recorded significant damage to infrastructure and displaced residents, with heavy rains affecting crops and causing floods.

=== Comoros and Mayotte ===
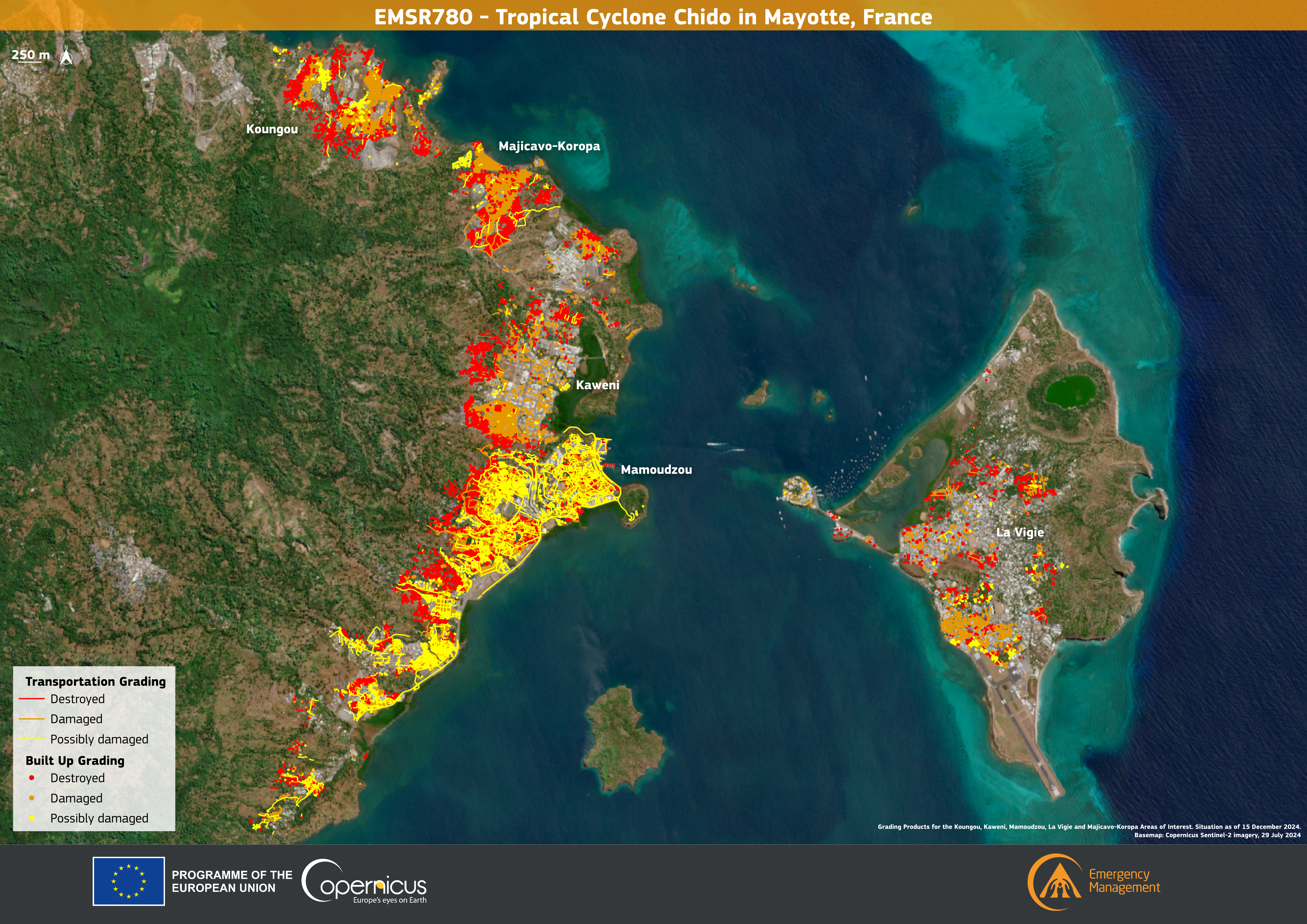
Analysis of damage in Mayotte Color key: Destroyed structures; Damaged structures; Possibly damaged structures

Chido was considered the worst storm to affect Mayotte in 90 years, with the cyclone reportedly destroying 90% of the island's structures. 40 people were killed in Mayotte with 41 more missing. Réunion La Première initially estimated that 60,000 fatalities were likely in a report that was later deleted after other sources debated the figure. Additionally, French politician Estelle Youssouffa claimed that tens-of-thousands of residents were missing or buried beneath the wreckage of destroyed shanty towns.

Up to 100,000 were displaced by the storm. Thousands more were declared missing on the island, including over 200 Red Cross volunteers. France Bleu reported that it would likely take weeks or possibly months to properly count the dead. More than 15,000 homes lost electricity, and 35,000 others were destroyed. Over 40% of the country's schools were rendered unusable due to the storm. The French Interior Ministry estimated 70% of the territory's population was severely affected. Mayotte's prefect François-Xavier Bieuville said Chido was the most violent and destructive cyclone since 1934.

In the capital, Mamoudzou, most homes, administrative buildings and part of the town hall were severely damaged, with entire shanty towns reported destroyed due to mudslides. The Kaweni slum, the largest in the territory with a population of about 20,000, was severely damaged, and faced food and water shortages. A warehouse for humanitarian supplies and a Red Cross building were damaged as well. Wind speeds reached 226 km/h (140 mph) at Dzaoudzi–Pamandzi International Airport, which suffered severe damage in the cyclone. The highest storm surge recorded in Mayotte was 28 ft (8.5 m).

Numerous homes were badly damaged and debris covered streets throughout the island. Mayotte Central Hospital also suffered extensive damage from the storm. Many roads were rendered inaccessible in the territory, significantly hampering relief efforts. By 18 December, up to 30% of roads in Mayotte remained inaccessible, and the mobile phone network remained unavailable to 80% of the population. Insurance losses reached around €650–800 million (US$675–831 million).

Five people were injured and 64,150 people were affected in the Comoros. In Anjouan, two people were injured and five houses were destroyed, with mosques, other houses and poultry coops suffering damage. In Grande Comore, 11 fishermen were declared missing but were found on 15 December. Chido also brought strong winds heavy rains to Mohéli, causing crop damage.

=== Southern Africa ===
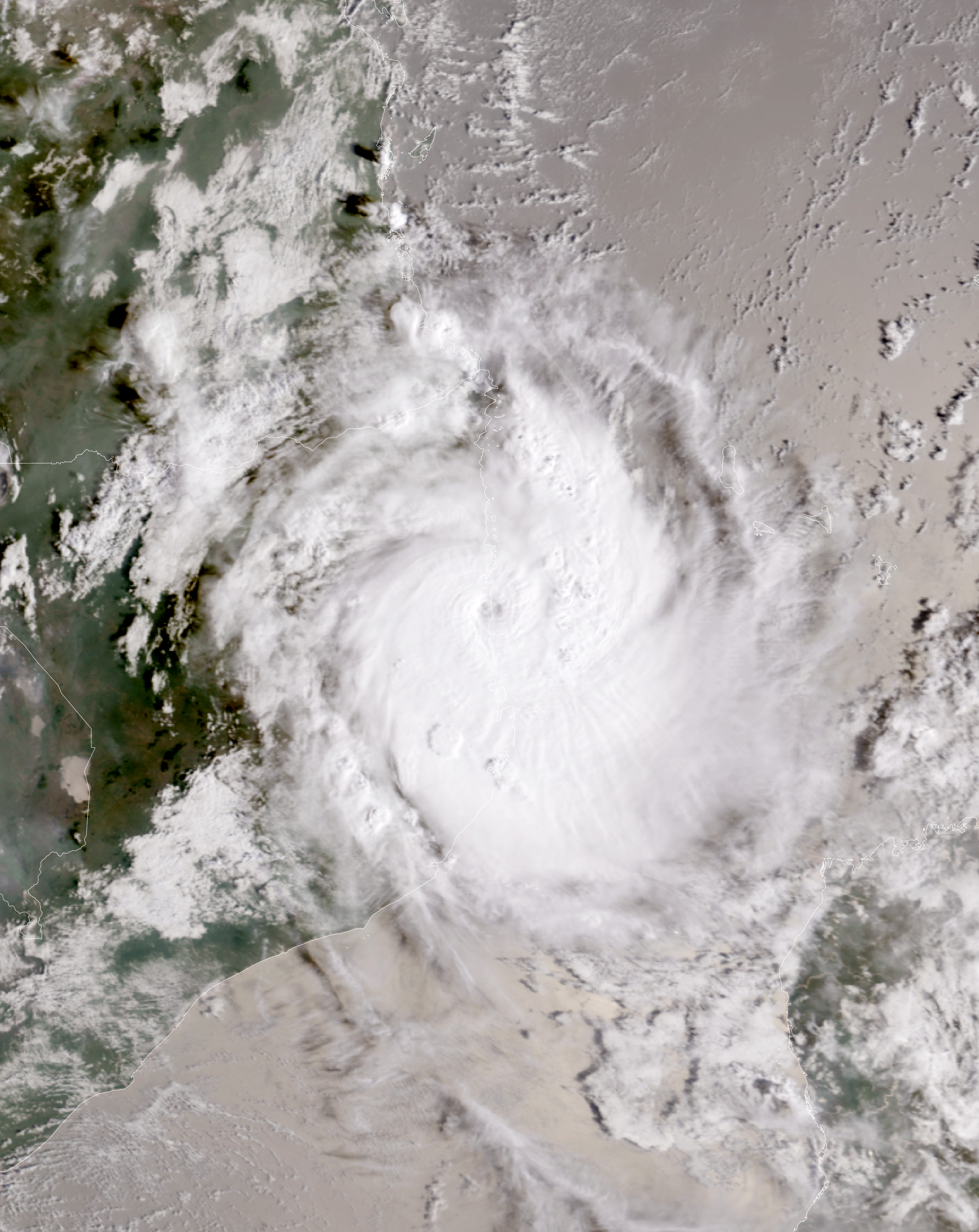
Chido making landfall near Pemba, Mozambique on 15 December.

At least 120 people were killed and about 900 were injured by Chido in Mozambique, where an estimated two million people were estimated to have been affected. At least 155,532 homes were completely or partially destroyed in the country, along with 1,126 classrooms, 52 health facilities, 35 places of worship, 11 telecommunications towers, 89 public buildings and 250 schools. Many homes, schools and health facilities were destroyed in Pemba, where communications were cut off by the cyclone. Damage in rural areas outside the city was reportedly much more severe, with 100% of homes damaged in Mecúfi District; 99% of homes were destroyed in the town of Murrebue, with two schools being the only structures left standing there, and in neighboring Chiúre District, 40% of homes were destroyed and 60% suffered roof damage. Damage in Cabo Delgado Province amounted to 380 million meticais (US$5.95 million). At least 10,159 households were affected by flooding caused by Chido in southern Malawi, with 13 deaths and 29 injuries recorded in the country. Schools and health facilities were also damaged in the country. Twenty of the country's 29 districts recorded "mild to severe damages".

The bishop of Pemba, which covers Cabo Delgado, in Mozambique described the desolation of the local population, already suffering from an islamist insurgency. "In our diocese, close to 50 churches, from parish headquarters to the churches of local communities, were either destroyed, or sustained damage to their roofs. It is a lot of destruction. We also have schools which had their roofs blown off, or floor destroyed, and a lot of other assets were wrecked as well. In Chiúre, all the roofs of the buildings in the Farm of Hope were damaged, so the destruction was widespread.”

== Aftermath ==
Costliest South-West Indian Ocean tropical cyclones
Rank	Tropical cyclones	Season	Damage
1	4 Chido	2024–25	$3.9 billion
2	4 Idai	2018–19	$3.3 billion
3	3 Gezani	2025–26	$2 billion
4	5 Freddy	2022–23	$1.53 billion
5	3 Garance	2024–25	$1.05 billion
6	3 Fytia	2025–26	$475 million
7	4 Enawo	2016–17	$400 million
8	4 Kenneth	2018–19	$345 million
9	4 Leon–Eline	1999–00	$309 million
10	4 Dina	2001–02	$287 million

On 16 December, Comoros declared a week of national mourning due to Chido's impact on Mayotte, which is predominantly inhabited by Comorans. At France's National Assembly, a minute of silence was held on 16 December. French prefect François-Xavier Bieuville added it would be extremely hard to count fatalities and many might never be recorded, partly due to the Muslim tradition of burying people within 24 hours. The French Interior Ministry said 1,600 police and gendarmerie officers were deployed to Mayotte to help residents and prevent looting, with 800 more expected to arrive in the coming days. Due to damage to Dzaoudzi–Pamandzi International Airport, operations there were limited to military aircraft. Interior Minister Bruno Retailleau visited Mamoudzou on 16 December. President Emmanuel Macron, who promised urgent help, was set to host a meeting on the situation at the Interior Ministry's crisis center in Paris later that day. Illegal immigrants had also avoided shelters during the cyclone out of deportation fears. Macron also declared a period of national mourning for 23 December. By 16 December 85% of Mayotte's households were still without power. Additional personnel were also brought in from Réunion. A nighttime curfew was imposed beginning on 17 December. Macron visited Mayotte on 19 December, during which he was heckled by residents of Tsingoni for the continuing lack of drinking water. He was also criticised for telling residents that the situation would have been much worse had Mayotte not been part of France. French premier François Bayrou also visited Mayotte on 30 December and announced a recovery plan for the territory.

Due to Chido, schools were closed in most districts in southern Malawi on 16 December. The European Commission provided additional emergency assistance, including €900,000 in aid, to support communities affected by Cyclone Chido in Mayotte and Mozambique, while Belgium delivered humanitarian aid to Mayotte.

== See also ==
- Weather of 2024
- Tropical cyclones in 2024
- Tropical cyclones in the Comoros Islands
- Cyclone Kenneth (2019) – Made landfall in a similar region at a similar intensity in Mozambique
- Cyclone Gombe (2022) – Another strong cyclone that made landfall in the same region
- Hurricane Maria (2017) – An Atlantic hurricane which devastated Puerto Rico at a similar intensity and resulted in a heavily disputed death toll
