= Mamoudzou =

Place in Mayotte, France

- Prefecture and commune
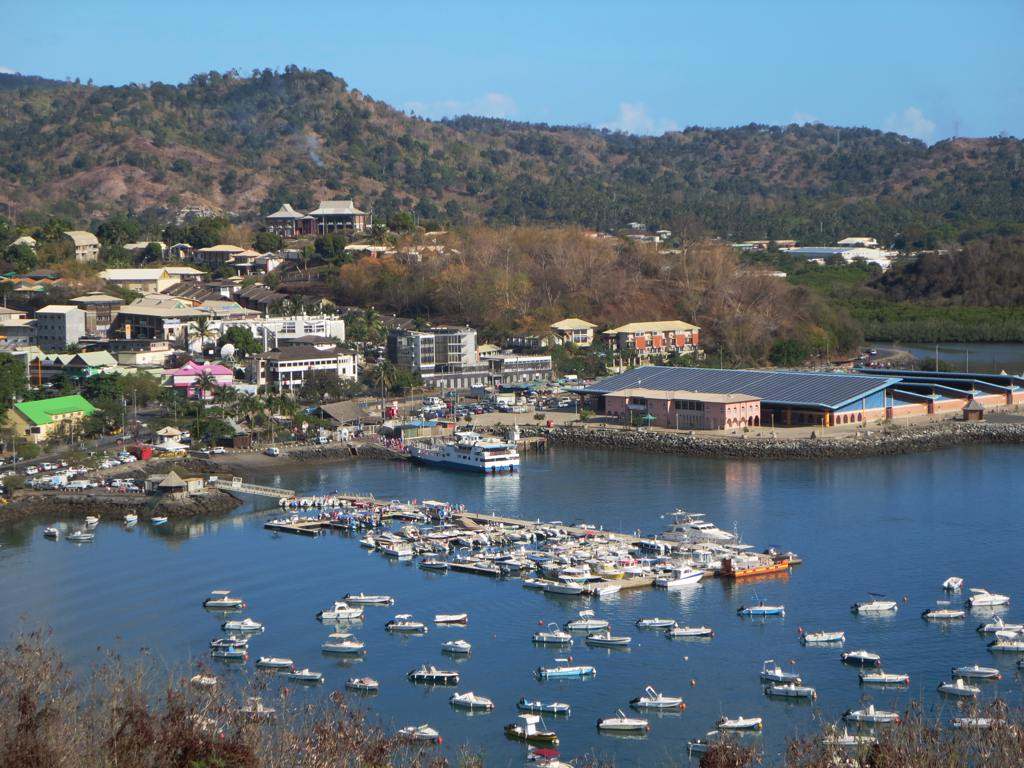
- Mamoudzou

- Coat of arms

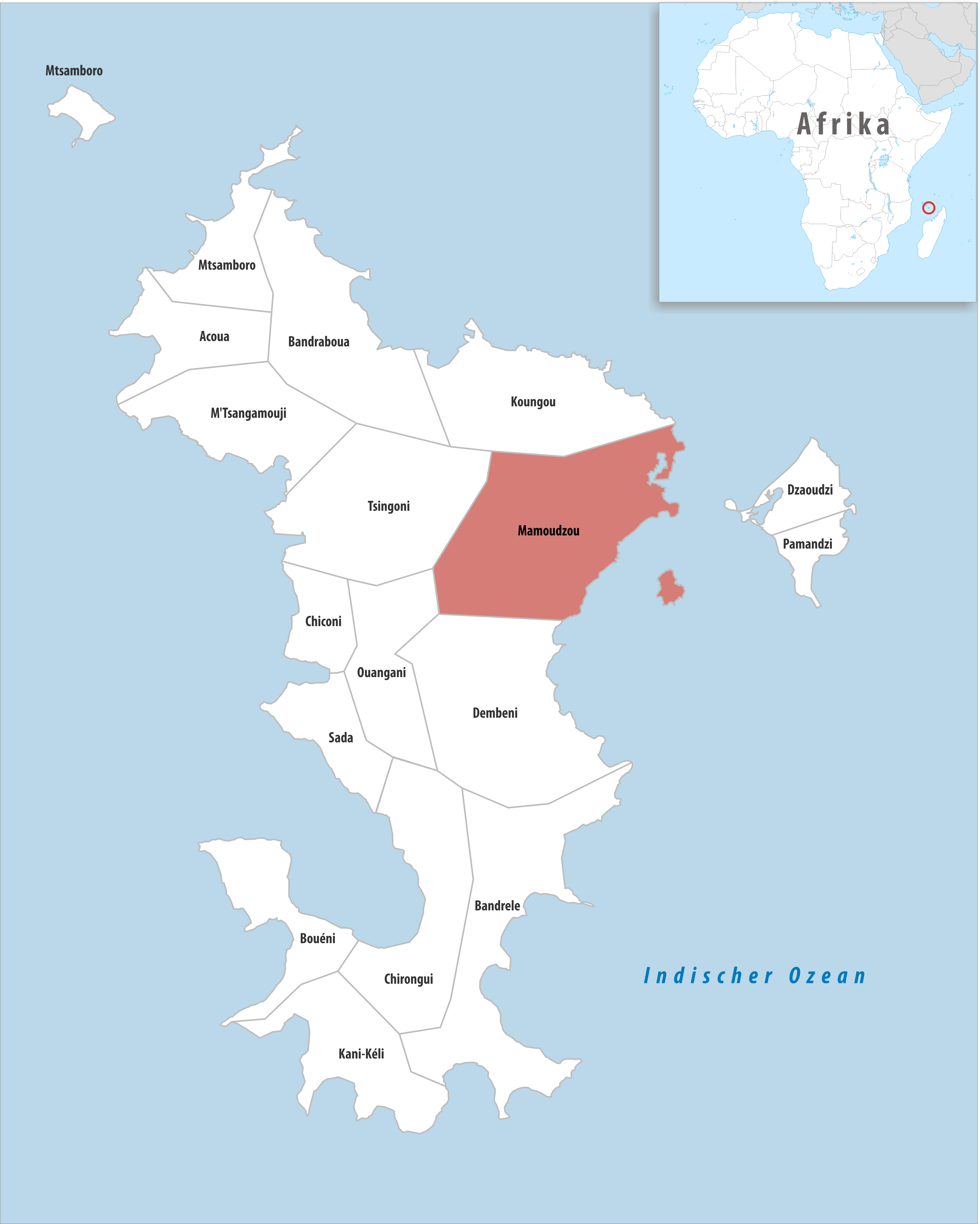
- Location of the commune (in red) within Mayotte
- Location of Mamoudzou
- Coordinates: 12°46′50″S 45°13′40″E
- Country: France
- Overseas region and department: Mayotte
- Canton: 3 cantons
- Intercommunality: CA Dembeni-Mamoudzou

Government
  - Mayor (2020–2026): Ambdilwahedou Soumaila
- Area^{1}: 42.3 km^{2} (16.3 sq mi)
- Highest elevation: 572 m (1,877 ft)
- Lowest elevation: 0 m (0 ft)
- Population (2017): 71,437
  - Density: 1,690/km^{2} (4,370/sq mi)
- Time zone: UTC+03:00
- INSEE/Postal code: 97611 /97600
- ^{1} French Land Register data, which excludes lakes, ponds, glaciers > 1 km^{2} (0.386 sq mi or 247 acres) and river estuaries.

Mamoudzou (French pronunciation: [mamudzu]; Momojou) is the capital city of Mayotte, a French overseas region and department in the Indian Ocean. Mamoudzou is the most populated commune (municipality) of Mayotte. It is located on Grande-Terre (or Maoré), the main island of Mayotte.

The commune is composed of six villages in addition to Mamoudzou. These are: Kawéni, Mtsapéré, Passamainti, Vahibé, Tsoundzou I and Tsoundzou II. The commune is also subdivided into three cantons: Mamoudzou-1, Mamoudzou-2 and Mamoudzou-3.

The government owns the radio station in Mamoudzou and broadcasts in French and Mahorian. The government departments are all situated in the town.

== History ==
The former capital of Mayotte was Dzaoudzi, on the small island of Petite-Terre (or Pamandzi), but Mamoudzou was chosen as the capital in 1977. In the 1985 census, 12,026 people were recorded in the main town.

There have been environmental concerns about marine pollution in the area; "important degradation in the quality of the coastal waters" between 1977 and 2007 has been reported in the Coral Reef Lagoon in the Mamoudzou–Dzaoudzi strait, and in the Mamoudzou–Majikavo conurbation.

In December 2024, Cyclone Chido destroyed most homes, administrative buildings and part of the town hall in Mamoudzou.

== Climate ==
Mamoudzou has a tropical savanna climate (Köppen climate classification Aw). The average annual temperature in Mamoudzou is 27.4 °C (81.3 °F). The average annual rainfall is 1,342.4 mm (52.85 in) with January as the wettest month. The temperatures are highest on average in April, at around 28.7 °C (83.7 °F), and lowest in August, at around 25.8 °C (78.4 °F). The highest temperature ever recorded in Mamoudzou was 34.8 °C (94.6 °F) on 21 April 2010; the coldest temperature ever recorded was 9.5 °C (49.1 °F) on 18 July 1999.

Climate data for Mamoudzou (1991–2020 averages, extremes 1999−present)
Month	Jan	Feb	Mar	Apr	May	Jun	Jul	Aug	Sep	Oct	Nov	Dec	Year
Record high °C (°F)	34.5 (94.1)	34.2 (93.6)	34.7 (94.5)	34.8 (94.6)	34.7 (94.5)	33.2 (91.8)	32.3 (90.1)	32.2 (90.0)	33.8 (92.8)	33.4 (92.1)	33.8 (92.8)	34.0 (93.2)	34.8 (94.6)
Mean daily maximum °C (°F)	30.9 (87.6)	31.2 (88.2)	31.9 (89.4)	32.3 (90.1)	31.4 (88.5)	30.1 (86.2)	29.3 (84.7)	29.6 (85.3)	30.1 (86.2)	30.7 (87.3)	30.9 (87.6)	31.1 (88.0)	30.8 (87.4)
Daily mean °C (°F)	27.9 (82.2)	28.1 (82.6)	28.5 (83.3)	28.7 (83.7)	28.0 (82.4)	26.8 (80.2)	25.9 (78.6)	25.8 (78.4)	26.2 (79.2)	27.0 (80.6)	27.6 (81.7)	28.0 (82.4)	27.4 (81.3)
Mean daily minimum °C (°F)	25.0 (77.0)	25.0 (77.0)	25.1 (77.2)	25.1 (77.2)	24.6 (76.3)	23.5 (74.3)	22.4 (72.3)	22.0 (71.6)	22.3 (72.1)	23.3 (73.9)	24.3 (75.7)	24.9 (76.8)	24.0 (75.2)
Record low °C (°F)	21.6 (70.9)	22.0 (71.6)	21.5 (70.7)	22.0 (71.6)	21.7 (71.1)	20.5 (68.9)	18.5 (65.3)	19.5 (67.1)	19.8 (67.6)	18.6 (65.5)	21.8 (71.2)	22.0 (71.6)	18.5 (65.3)
Average precipitation mm (inches)	315.1 (12.41)	257.3 (10.13)	251.9 (9.92)	86.5 (3.41)	40.6 (1.60)	22.2 (0.87)	11.8 (0.46)	15.6 (0.61)	23.4 (0.92)	49.9 (1.96)	97.2 (3.83)	170.9 (6.73)	1,342.4 (52.85)
Average precipitation days (≥ 1.0 mm)	16.5	14.4	14.5	7.5	4.0	3.0	2.5	2.5	3.1	4.9	7.8	12.1	92.8
Source: Météo-France

== Administration ==
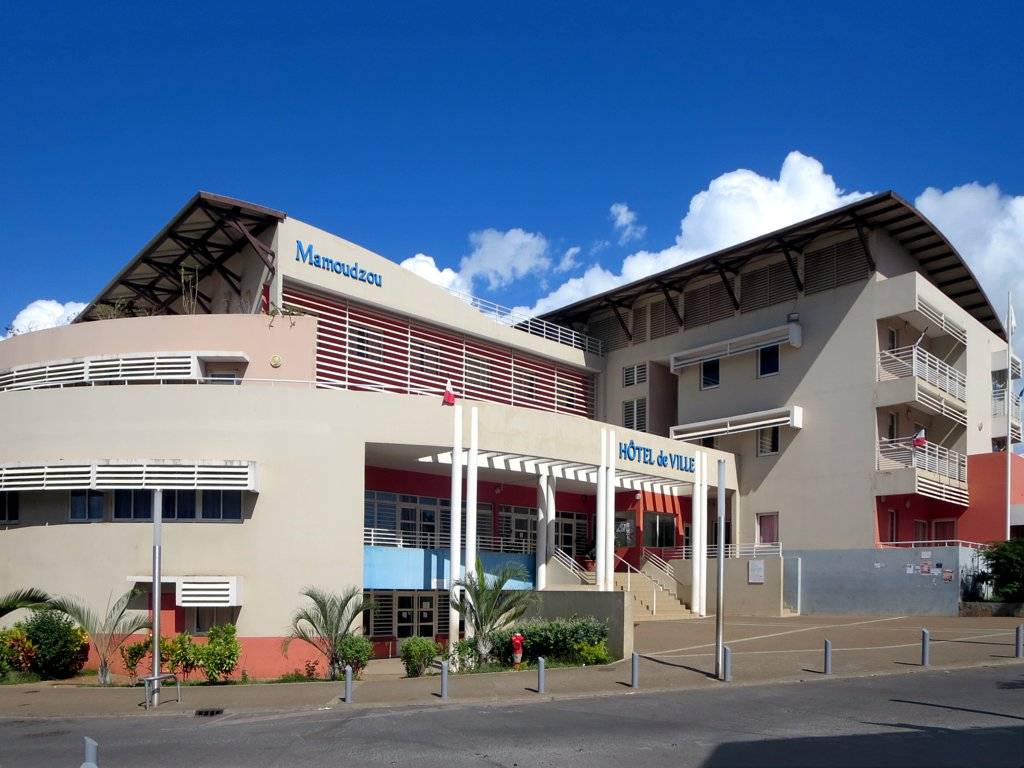
The Hôtel de Ville

The commune is composed of six villages in addition to its central habitation, also called Mamoudzou. These are: Kawéni, Mtsapéré, Passamainti, Vahibé, Tsoundzou I and Tsoundzou II.

The commune is also subdivided into three cantons: Mamoudzou-1, Mamoudzou-2 and Mamoudzou-3.

The government owns the radio station in Mamoudzou and broadcasts in French and Mahorian. The government departments, including Agriculture and Forestry, Education, Health and Social Security, Public Works, Work, Employment and Training and Youth and Sports are situated on the Rue Mariaze in the town. The government departments have been based in the town since before it became the capital, from World War II. France Télécom operates in the town.

The Hôtel de Ville was inaugurated in July 2009.

== Population ==
Historical population
Year	Pop.	±% p.a.
1966	4,556	—
1978	7,798	+4.58%
1985	12,026	+6.38%
1991	20,307	+9.12%
1997	32,733	+8.28%
2002	45,485	+6.80%
2007	53,122	+3.15%
2012	57,281	+1.52%
2017	71,437	+4.52%
Source: SPLAF (1966-2007) and INSEE (2012-2017)

Village Populations
Village	1997	2002
Kavani	3 948	5 488
Kaweni	6 206	9 604
Mamoudzou	5 666	6 533
Mtsapéré	6 979	10 495
Passamainty	5 173	6 008
Tsountsou 1	2 093	3 058
Tsountsou 2	574	1 063
Vahibé	2 135	3 236
Statistics accurate as of 1997

== Economy ==
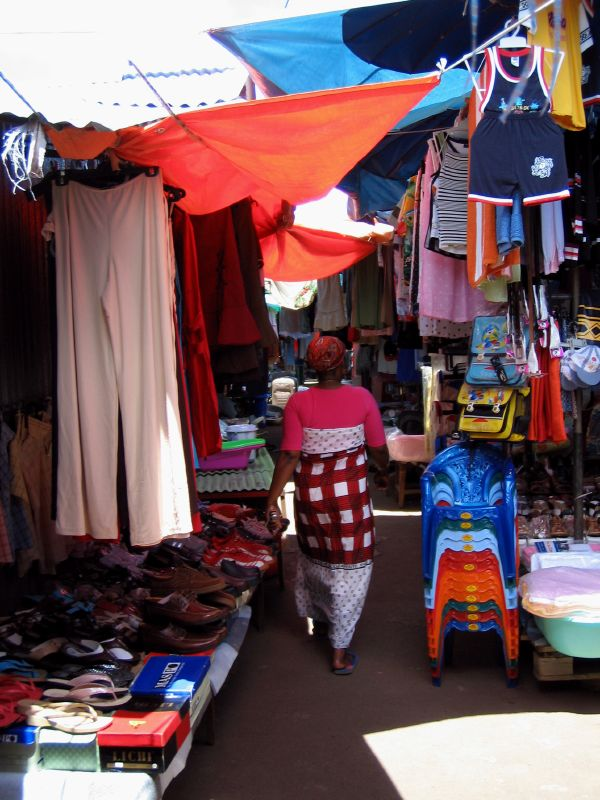
Place du Marché

Mamoudzou has a bank and shopping centre. The economic centre of the town is the Place du Marche, where the bank, Air France and Ewa Air offices, and the tourist office are located. The headquarters of the magazine Jana na Leo, "primarily concerned with articles on social life of the island of Mahore", is published in Mamoudzou. Noteworthy restaurants in Mamoudzou include the Les Terrasses, Hotel Restaurant Isijiva, Le Barfly and Mamoudzou La Kaz.

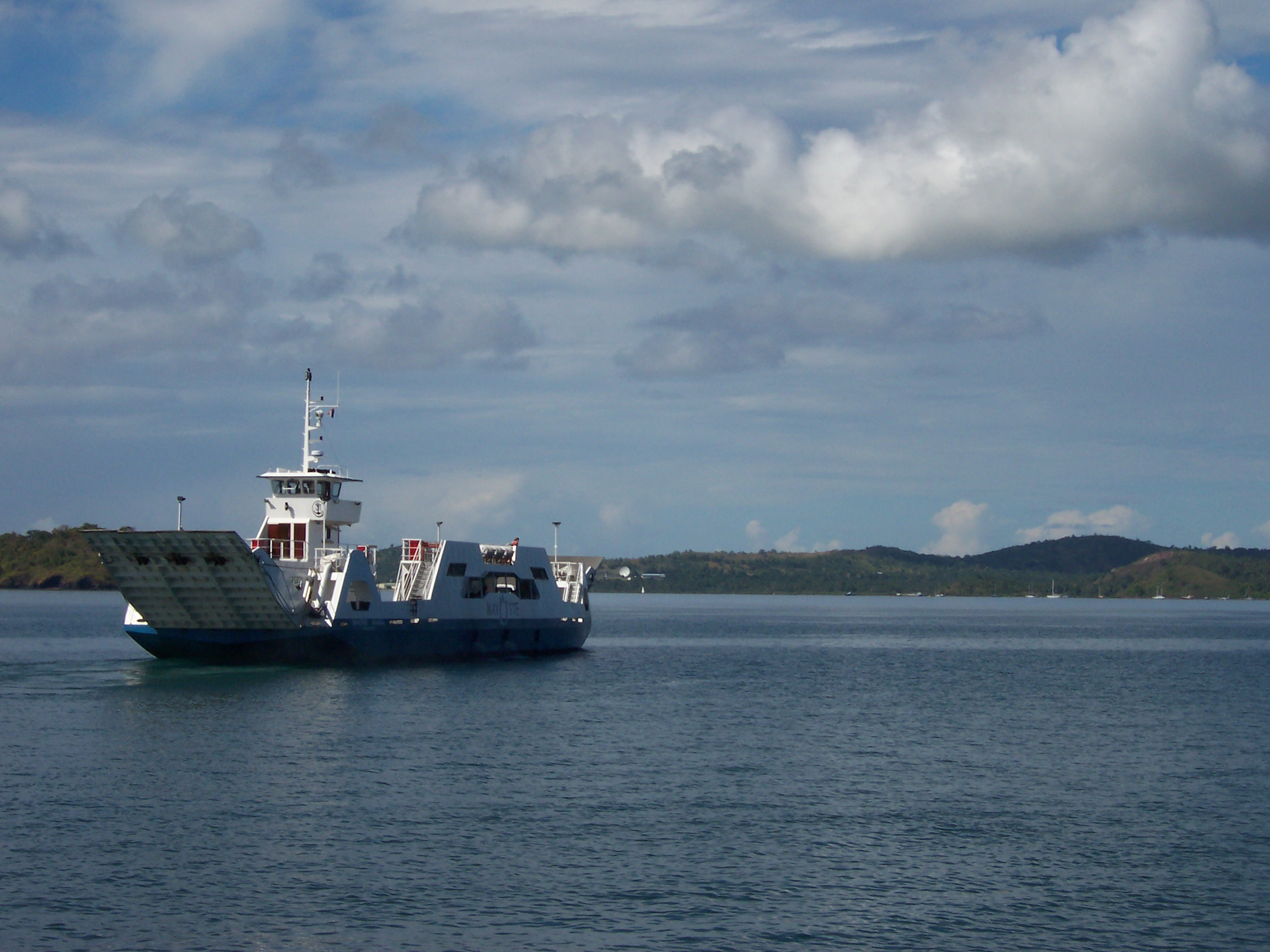
Ferry in motion between Dzaoudzi and Mamoudzou

A ferry service is provided for tourists to the island of Petite Terre.

== Notable people ==
- Manou Mansour (born 1980), French poet

== Religion ==
=== Churches ===
- Our Lady of Fatima Church, Mamoudzou
