= 2000 Mahoran status referendum =

Agreement on the legal status of Mayotte

A referendum on the Paris Agreement was held in Mayotte on 2 July 2000. The agreement allowed Mayotte to become a "collectivité départementale", and provided for another referendum on status in ten years' time. It was approved by 72.93% of voters. A further referendum on becoming an overseas department was subsequently held in 2009.

== Results ==
Choice	Votes	%
For	23,036	72.93
Against	8,548	27.07
Invalid/blank votes	342	–
Total	31,926	100
Registered voters/turnout	45,634	69.96
Source: Direct Democracy
