= Kaweni =

Coordinates: 12°46′17″S 45°13′25″E

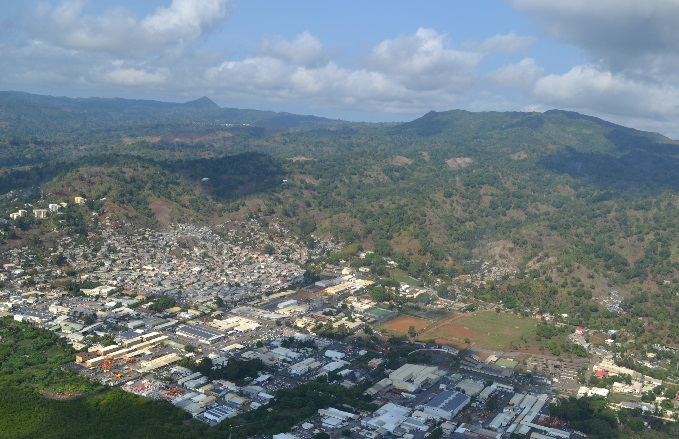
Kaweni Aerial View

Kaweni is a village in the commune of Mamoudzou on the French overseas island of Mayotte.
