= Apostolic Vicariate of the Comoros Archipelago =

Catholic missionary jurisdiction in the Indian Ocean

Coordinates: 11.7038°S 43.2524°E

Apostolic Vicariate of Comoros Archipelago Vicariatus Apostolicus Insularum Comorensium
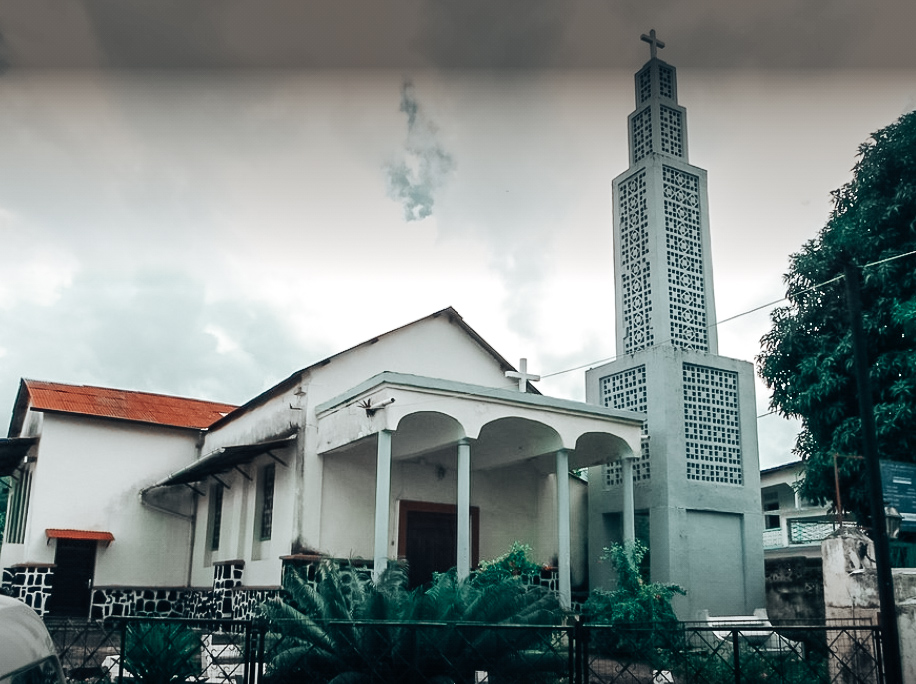
- Cathedral of St. Therese of the Child Jesus in Moroni, Comoros

Location
- Country: Comoros
- Headquarters: Moroni, Comoros

Statistics
- Area: 2,235 km^{2} (863 sq mi)
- Population: Total; Catholics: (as of 2024); 1,246,833; 6,629 (0.5%)
- Parishes: 5

Information
- Denomination: Catholic Church
- Sui iuris church: Latin Church
- Rite: Roman Rite
- Established: 5 June 1975; 51 years ago
- Cathedral: Cathedral of St. Therese of the Child Jesus in Moroni, Comoros
- Secular priests: 6

Current leadership
- Vicar Apostolic: Charles Mahuza Yava, S.D.S.
- Apostolic Administrator: Gilbert Aubry

The Apostolic Vicariate of the Comoros Archipelago is a Latin apostolic vicariate (missionary pre-diocesan jurisdiction) of the Roman Catholic Church in the Indian Ocean between insular Madagascar and continental Africa, comprising the Comoros and Mayotte, with a church in each.

The see is at Moroni on Grande Comore island. It is exempt, i.e. directly subject to the Holy See, not part of any ecclesiastical province.

== History ==
On 5 June 1975, the Holy See established an Apostolic Administration of Comoros on the present territory, which was split from the Diocese of Ambanja (on Madagascar), whose former last apostolic vicar and then first bishop was appointed to the new missionary post. On 1 May 2010, it was promoted as Apostolic Vicariate of the Comoros.

== Incumbent Ordinaries ==
To date, all incumbents have been missionary members of three Latin congregations:

Apostolic Administrators of Comoros

- Léon-Adolphe Messmer, OFMCap (5 June 1975 – 2 May 1980), retired
- Jean Berchmans Eugène Jung, OFMCap (2 May 1980 – 1983)
- Pro-administrator Jean Péault, MEP (1988 – 1991; see below)
- Pro-administrator Gabriel Franco Nicolai, OFMCap (1991 – 1997)
- Pro-administrator Jean Péault, MEP (see above; 1997 – 1998)
- Jan Szpilka, SDS (1 April 1998 – 6 June 2006), resigned
- Jan Geerits, SDS (6 June 2006 – 1 May 2010), resigned
- Gilbert Aubry (1 August 2024 – Present)

Apostolic Vicars of Comoros

- Charles Mahuza Yava, SDS (1 May 2010 – Present)

== See also ==
- Catholic Church in the Comoros
- Catholic Church in Mayotte
