= Canton of Tsingoni =

French administrative division

Coordinates: 12.79°S 45.11°E

The canton of Tsingoni is an administrative division of Mayotte, an overseas department and region of France. Its borders were modified at the French canton reorganisation which came into effect in March 2015. Its seat is in Tsingoni.

It consists of the following communes:

1. M'Tsangamouji
2. Tsingoni
