= Cantons of Mamoudzou =

Coordinates: 12.78°S 45.23°E

The cantons of Mamoudzou are administrative divisions of Mayotte, an overseas department and region of France. Since the French canton reorganisation which came into effect in March 2015, the city of Mamoudzou is subdivided into three cantons. Their seat is in Mamoudzou.

== Cantons ==
Name	Population (2012)	Cantonal Code	Map
Canton of Mamoudzou-1	17,863	97606	
Canton of Mamoudzou-2	20,303	97607	
Canton of Mamoudzou-3	19,115	97608	
