= Catholic Church in Mayotte =

Mayotte

The Catholic Church in Mayotte is part of the worldwide Catholic Church, under the spiritual leadership of the Pope in Rome.

The population of Mayotte is approximately 3% Catholic and other Christian denominations, with the majority of Mahorians being Sunni Muslim.

== Classification ==
- Apostolic Vicariate
  - Apostolic Vicariate of the Comoros Archipelago
