= Bemamy Beriziky =

Malagasy politician and artist

- Occupations: Politician, Artist

Bemamy Beriziky (known as: Fandrama) is a Malagasy artist and a politician. A member of the National Assembly of Madagascar, he was elected as a member of the Tiako I Madagasikara party in the 2007 Malagasy parliamentary elections. He represents the second constituency of Anivorano Nord (Diana).
