= Pro-administrator =

A pro-administrator is a priest who fills an ad interim vacancy at a clerical post in the Catholic church whose ordinary is styled administrator, notably a 'stable' apostolic administration.

However apostolic administrator is also used for a similar ad interim at a post of episcopal and/or missionary pre-diocesan rank.
