= Mayotte =

Overseas department of France

- Overseas department, region and single territorial collectivity of France and outermost region of the European Union
- Department of Mayotte; Département de Mayotte (French)
- Coat of arms
- Anthem: La Marseillaise ("The Marseillaise")

- Mayotte in the Comoros
- Coordinates: 12°50′35″S 45°8′18″E
- Country: France
- Prefecture: Mamoudzou
- Departments: 1

Government
  - President of the Departmental Council: Ben Issa Ousseni (LR)

Area
  - Total: 374 km^{2} (144 sq mi)
  - Rank: 18th region

Population (Jan. 2024)
  - Total: 320,901
  - Density: 858/km^{2} (2,220/sq mi)
- Demonym: Mahoran

GDP
  - Total: €2.932 billion
  - Per capita: €11,300
- Time zone: UTC+03:00 (EAT)
- ISO 3166 code: YT; FR-976
- Currency: Euro (€) (EUR)
- Website: Prefecture; Departmental Council

Mayotte (/maɪˈɒt/ my-OT; French: Mayotte, [majɔt]; Shimaore: Maore, IPA: [maˈore]; Kibushi: Maori, IPA: [maˈori]), officially the Department of Mayotte (French: Département de Mayotte), is an overseas department and region and single territorial collectivity of France. It is one of the overseas departments of France as well as one of the 18 regions of France, with the same status as the departments of Metropolitan France. It is an outermost region of the European Union and, as an overseas department of France, part of the eurozone.

Mayotte is located in the northern part of the Mozambique Channel in the western Indian Ocean off the coast of Southeastern Africa, between the northwestern part of the island of Madagascar and northeastern Mozambique on the continent. Mayotte consists of a main island, Grande-Terre (or Maore), a smaller island, Petite-Terre (or Pamanzi), as well as several islets around these two. Mayotte's land area is 374 square kilometres (144 sq mi) and, with its 320,901 people according to January 2024 official estimates, is very densely populated at 858 inhabitants per km^{2} (2,228 per sq mi). The biggest city and prefecture is Mamoudzou on the larger Grande-Terre. The Dzaoudzi–Pamandzi International Airport is located on the neighbouring smaller island of Petite-Terre. The territory is also known as Maore, the native name of its main island.

French is the official language and is spoken as a second language by an increasing part of the population, with 63% of the population 14 years and older reporting in the 2007 census that they could speak it. There are two native languages of Mayotte. The most commonly spoken is Shimaore, and the lesser spoken is a Malagasy language called Kibushi, of which there are two dialects; Kibushi sakalava, most closely related to the Sakalava dialect of Malagasy, and Kibushi antalaotsi, most closely related to the dialect spoken by the Antalaotra of Madagascar. Both dialects have been influenced by Shimaore.

The islands were populated from neighbouring East Africa, with a later arrival of Arabs, who brought the religious faith of Islam. A sultanate was established in 1500. The vast majority of the population today is Muslim. In the 19th century, Mayotte was conquered by Andriantsoly, former king of Iboina on Madagascar. He sold the islands in 1841 to France (Kingdom of France and its later July Monarchy of 1830–1848) and its overseas French Empire, and Mayotte integrated to the Crown of France of King Louis Philippe I (1773–1850, reigned 1830–1848, of the royal dynasty of the House of Bourbon-Orleans), then seven years later with the subsequent Second French Republic (1848–1852) after the French Revolution of 1848. In the immediate aftermath of French sovereignty over the islands, slavery was abolished and laborers were imported to the area to work in fields and plantations. Mayotte chose to remain with France after the nearby Comoros declared its independence following their 1974 independence referendum. Mayotte however became the 101st department of France (Fifth French Republic) on 31 March 2011 and became an outermost associated region of the European Union on 1 January 2014, following a March 2009 referendum with an overwhelming result in favour of remaining in the status of a French department. The issue of illegal immigration became very important in local political life in the 2010s and 2020s which led France to organize Operation Wuambushu.

In 2019, with an annual population growth of 3.8%, half the current population was less than 17 years old. In addition, 48% of the population were foreign nationals. Most of the immigrants come from neighboring island state of Comoros, many illegally. Despite being France's poorest department, Mayotte is much richer than other neighboring East African countries and has developed French infrastructure and welfare system, making it a tempting destination for Comorans and other East Africans living in poverty in the region.

The department faces enormous challenges. According to an Institut national de la statistique et des études économiques (National Institute of Economic Statistics Studies of France – INSEE) report published in 2018, over 83% of the population live under the poverty line according to French standards, compared to 16% in metropolitan France, 40% of dwellings are corrugated sheet metal shacks, 29% of households have no running water, and 34% of the inhabitants between the age of 15 and 64 do not have a job. These difficult living conditions mainly concern the large population of illegal migrants who crowd into shanty towns.

== Geography ==
Topographic map of Mayotte, the "seahorse island"

The term Mayotte (or Maore) may refer to all of the department's islands, of which the largest is known as Maore (French: Grande-Terre) and includes Maore's surrounding islands, most notably Pamanzi (French: Petite-Terre), or only to the largest island. The name is believed to come from Mawuti, contraction of the Arabic جزيرة الموت Jazīrat al-Mawt – meaning "island of death" (maybe due to the dangerous reefs circling the island) and corrupted to Mayotta in Portuguese, later turned into French. However, the local name is Maore, and the Arabic etymology is doubtful.

The main island, Grande-Terre (or Maore), geologically the oldest of the Comoro Islands, is 39 kilometres (24 mi) long and 22 kilometres (14 mi) wide, and its highest point is Mount Benara, at 660 metres (2,165 ft) above sea level. Because of the volcanic rock, the soil is relatively rich in some areas. A coral reef encircling much of the island ensures protection for ships and a habitat for fish. Dzaoudzi was the capital of Mayotte (and earlier the capital of all the colonial Comoros) until 1977, when the capital was relocated to Mamoudzou on the main island of Grande-Terre. It is situated on Petite-Terre (or Pamanzi), which at 10 square kilometres (4 sq mi) is the largest of several islets adjacent to Maore. The area of the lagoon behind the reef is approximately 1,500 square kilometres (580 sq mi), reaching a maximum depth of about 80m. It is described as "the largest barrier-reef-lagoon complex within the southwestern Indian Ocean".

=== Topography ===
Mayotte is the oldest of the four large islands of the Comoros archipelago, a chain of land emerging from a crescent-shaped submarine relief at the entrance to the Mozambique Channel. Located 295 km (183 mi) west of Madagascar and 67 km (42 mi) southeast of Anjouan, sometimes visible at sunset in the shade, it is composed of several islands and islets covered with lush vegetation. The two largest islands are Grande-Terre and Petite-Terre, backed by a coral reef.

This 160 km (99 mi) long coral reef surrounds a 1,100 km^{2} (420 sq mi) lagoon, one of the largest and deepest in the world. Part of the barrier reef features a double barrier that is rare on the planet. It protects almost all of Mayotte from ocean currents and waves, except for a dozen passes, including one in the east called the "S-pass". The lagoon, which averages 5 to 10 km (3.1 to 6.2 mi) wide, is up to 100 m (330 ft) deep.

It is dotted with about a hundred coral islets, such as Mtsamboro. This reef serves as a refuge for boats and oceanic fauna. The volcanic activity that created the islands makes the soil particularly fertile.

The total area of Mayotte is about 374 km^{2} (144 sq mi), which makes it by far the smallest French overseas department (after Martinique, which is three times larger at 1,128 km^{2} (436 sq mi)). However, this area is difficult to assess accurately, given the number of small uninhabited islets, some of which are completely underwater at high tide, but may reveal significant areas at low tide. The main islands are

- Grande-Terre, 363 km^{2} (140 sq mi), is 39 km (24 mi) long and 22 km (14 mi) wide. Its highest points are: Mount Bénara or Mavingoni (660 m (2,170 ft)), Mount Choungui (594 m (1,949 ft)), Mount Mtsapéré (572 m (1,877 ft)), and Mount Combani (477 m (1,565 ft)). It is home to Mamoudzou, which is the economic capital of Mayotte and houses the departmental council and the prefecture;
- Petite-Terre (or Pamanzi Island), with Dzaoudzi (official capital of Mayotte) and Pamandzi (where the airport is located). It is 11 km^{2} (4.2 sq mi);
- Mtsamboro is the third largest island (2 km^{2} (0.77 sq mi)). It is permanently inhabited, mainly by fishermen;
- Mbouzi islet (84 ha (210 acres)) is classified as a nature reserve;
- Bandrélé islet is the fifth largest island;
- Sable Blanc islet is located near the Saziley Marine Park (marine protected area).

== Environment ==
=== Geology ===
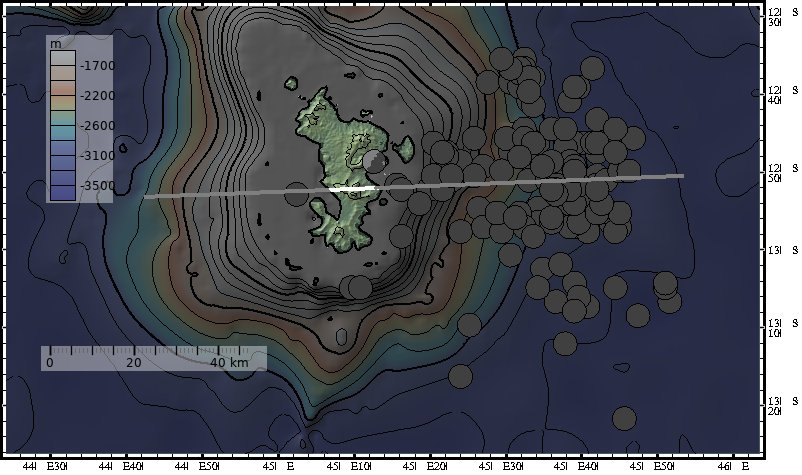
Topography of Mayotte

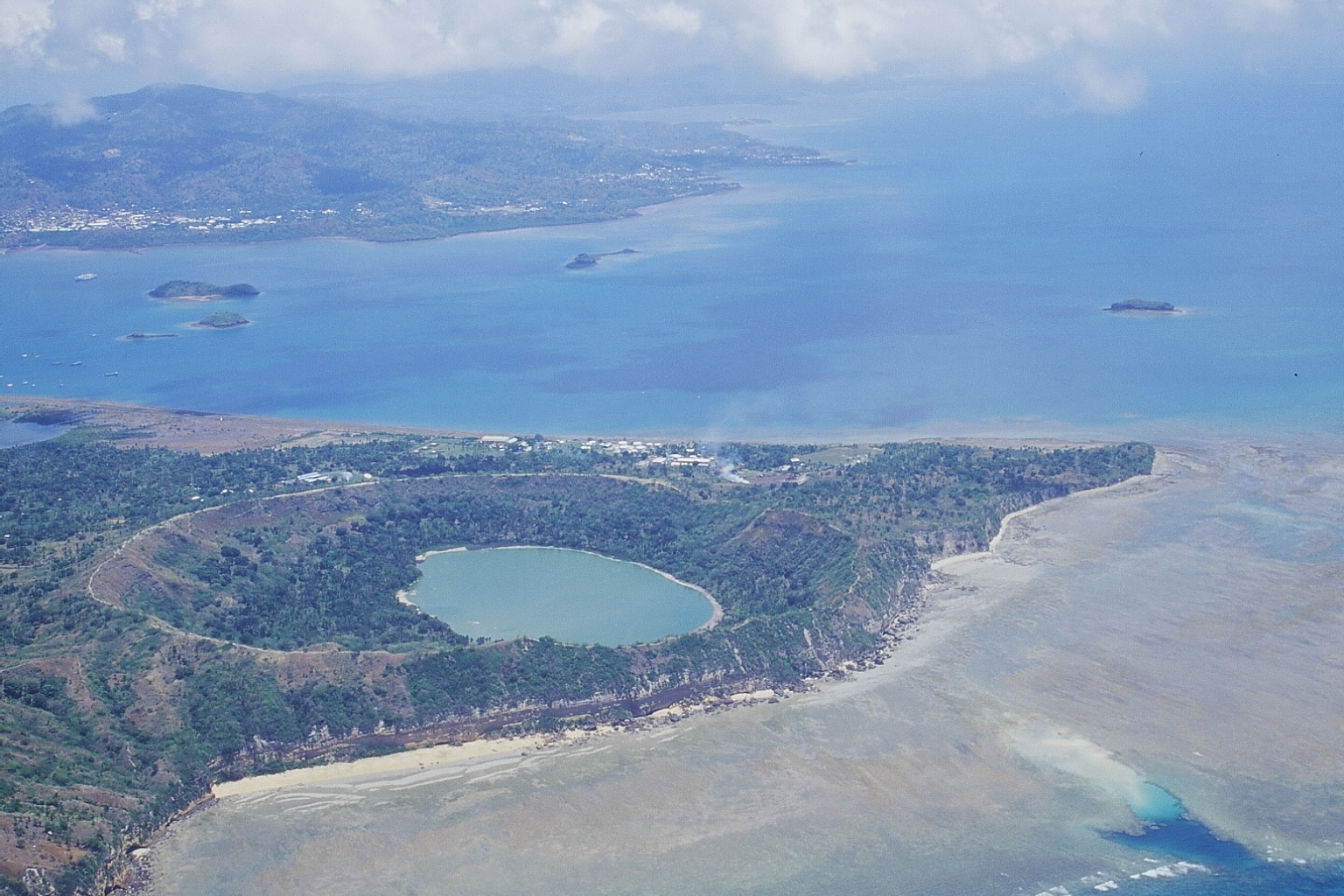
Dziani lake is the result of an ancient volcano that went extinct approximately 500,000 years ago.

Mayotte is a primarily volcanic island rising steeply from the bed of the ocean to a height of 660 metres (2,170 ft) on Mont Bénara (OpenStreetMap gives this as 661 metres (2,169 ft)).

Two volcanic centres are reported, a southern one (Pic Chongui, 594 metres (1,949 ft)) with a breached crater to the NW, and a northern centre (Mont M'Tsapéré, 572 metres (1,877 ft)) with a breached crater to the south-east. Mont Bénara is on the curving ridge between these two peaks, approximately at the contact point of the two structures. Volcanic activity started about 7.7 million years ago in the south, ceasing about 2.7 million years ago. In the north, activity started about 4.7 million years ago and lasted until about 1.4 million years ago. Both centres had several phases of activity. The most recent age reported for an ash band is 7000 year BP.

==== Earthquake swarm ====
The 11 November 2018, seismic event occurred about 15 miles (24 km) off the coast of Mayotte. It was recorded by seismograms in many places, including Kenya, Chile, New Zealand, Canada, and Hawaii located almost 11,000 miles (18,000 km) away. The seismic waves lasted for more than 20 minutes, but despite this, no one felt it. Subsequently, the earthquake swarm has been linked to a newly discovered undersea volcano located 50 km (31 mi) away from Mayotte at a depth of 3,500 m (11,500 ft).

=== Marine environment ===
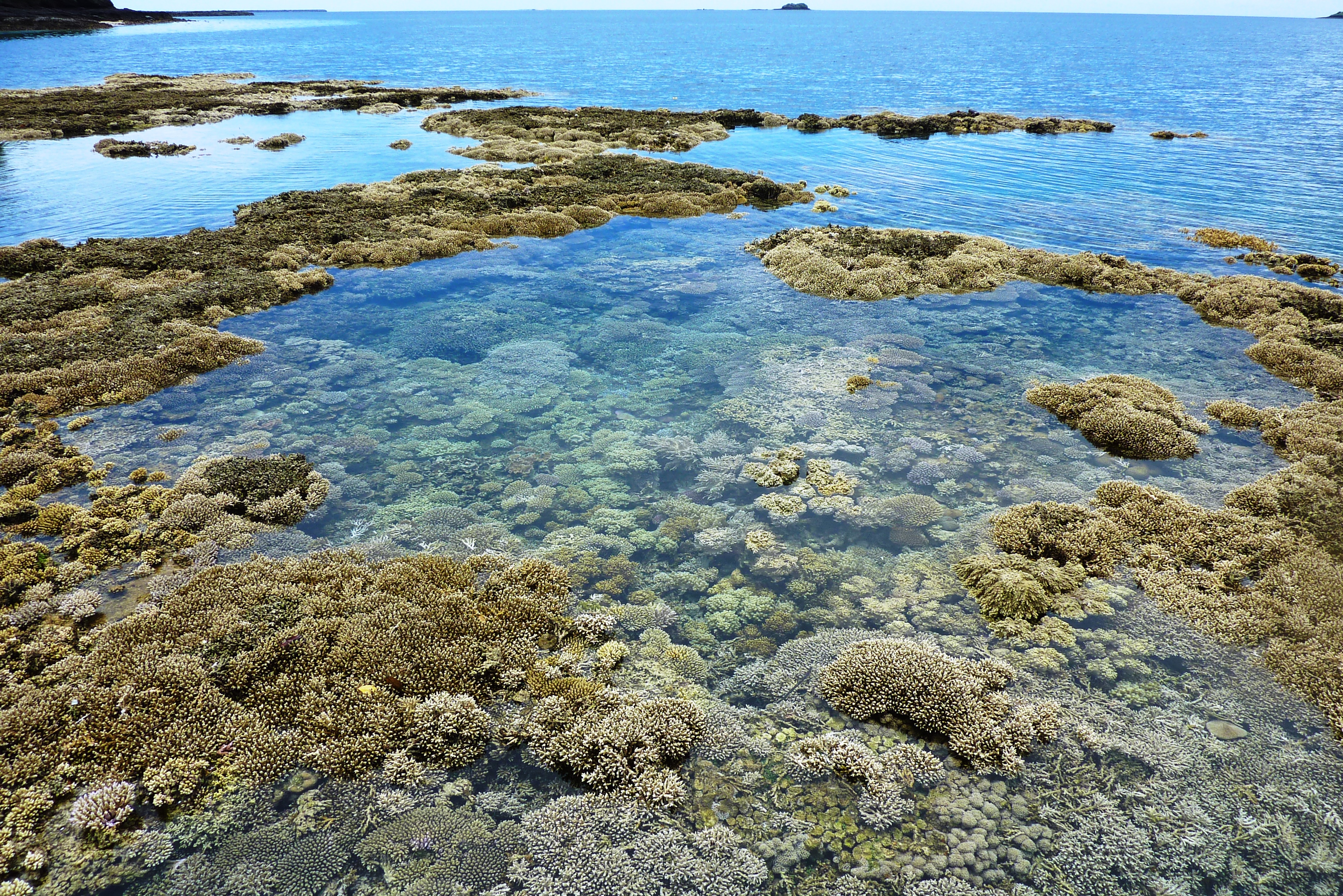
Coral reef at low tide at M'Bouzi island

Mayotte is surrounded by a typical tropical coral reef. It consists of a large outer barrier reef, enclosing one of the world's largest and deepest lagoons, followed by a fringing reef, interrupted by many mangroves. All Mayotte waters are ruled by a National Marine Park, and many places are natural reserves.

The outer coral reef is 195 km (121 mi) long, housing 1,500 km^{2} (580 sq mi) of lagoon, including 7.3 km^{2} (2.8 sq mi) of mangrove. There are at least 250 different species of coral, 760 tropical fish species, and the National Natural Heritage Inventory (INPN) has no fewer than 3,616 marine species, but this is probably a far cry from the actual count. As this region of the world is still poorly inventoried by scientists, the waters of Mayotte continue to harbour many species unknown to science, and allow important scientific discoveries each year.

=== Terrestrial environment ===
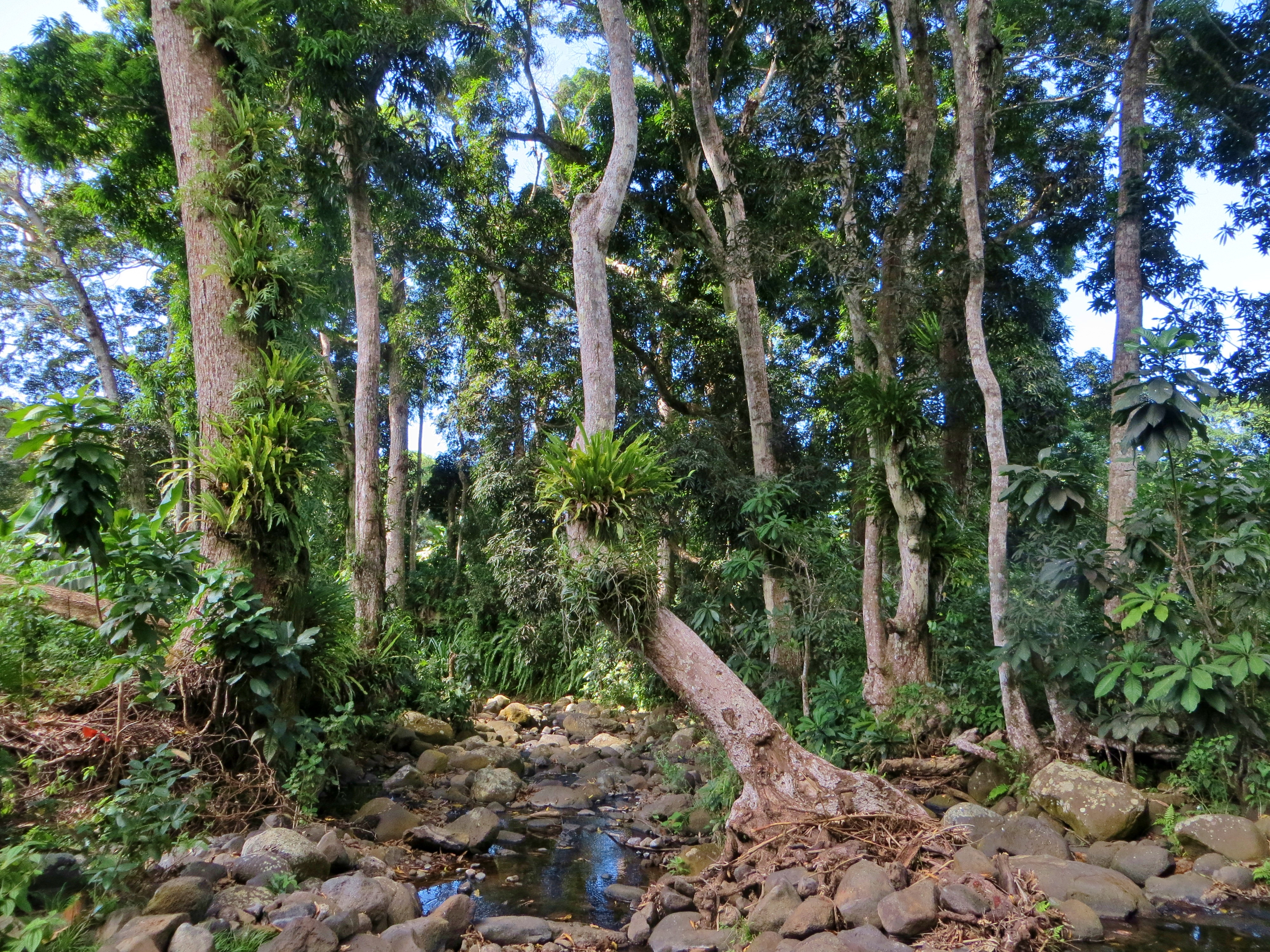
Riparian forest with great mango trees

Mayotte has a great diversity in its plant life: more than 1,300 species are recorded, half of them being endemic, making this island one of the richest in plant diversity in the world compared to its size. 15% of the island is classified as natural reserve; however, the primal forest now covers barely 5% of the island due to illegal deforestation.

Just like many volcanic islands, Mayotte shelters quite a limited mammal biodiversity, the only native species being flying foxes (Pteropus seychellensis comorensis). However, there are 18 species of reptiles, 23 of terrestrial molluscs, 116 butterflies, 38 dragonflies, 50 grasshoppers, and 150 beetles.

=== Protected areas ===
By 2021, there were 30 protected areas on Mayotte, totaling 55 km^{2} (21 sq mi) or 13.94% of Mayotte's land area, and 100% of Mayotte's marine area. Protected areas on Mayotte include Mayotte Marine Natural Park, Pointes et plages de Saziley et Charifou, and Ilôt Mbouzi National Nature Reserve.

On 3 May 2021, the French government created the Forests of Mayotte National Nature Reserve (Réserve Naturelle Nationale des Forêts de Mayotte). The reserve consists of 2,801 ha (6,920 acres) in six mountain forests, covering 51% of Mayotte's reserve forests and 7.5% of Mayotte's total land area. Areas protected by the reserve include Mount Mtsapéré, Mount Combani, Mount Benara, and Mount Choungui. The purpose of the reserve is to protect the relict primary forests of the island, restore the island's secondary forests, and protect the island's native flora and fauna.

== History ==
In 1500, the Maore sultanate was established on the island. In 1503, Mayotte was observed and named (firstly Espirito Santo) by Portuguese explorers, but not colonized. The island has known several eras of wealth (especially during the 11th century at Acoua or between 9th and 12th centuries at Dembéni), being an important part of the Swahili coast culture. However, its sister island Anjouan was preferred by international traders due to its better suitability to large boats, and, for a long time, Mayotte remained poorly developed compared to the three other Comoros islands, often being targeted by pirates and Malagasy or Comorian raids.

In the early 19th century, Mayotte was controlled by a mercantile family that claimed Omani origins. The Sultans of Mayotte had political ties with the Anjouan Sultanate during this period. Mayotte was sparsely populated and mainly consisted of Comorian speakers that were politically aligned with the local sultan and the Malagasy who were autonomous.

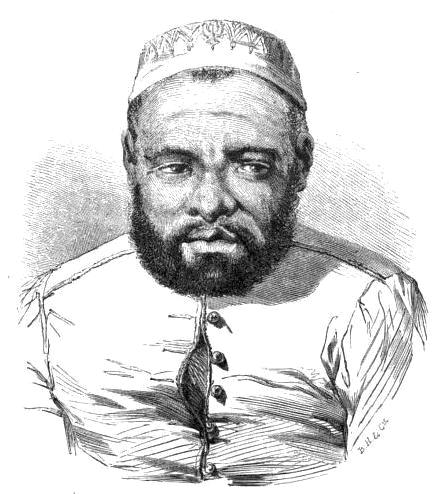
Andriantsoly, the last sultan of Mayotte, from 1832 to 1843

In 1832, Mayotte was conquered by Andriantsoly, former king of Iboina on Madagascar; in 1833, it was conquered by the neighbouring sultanate of Mwali (Mohéli in French). On 19 November 1835, Mayotte was again conquered by the Ndzuwani Sultanate (Anjouan sultanate in French); a governor was installed with the unusual Islamic style of Qadi (from the Arabic قاض, meaning "judge"). However, in 1836, it regained its independence under a last local Sultan. Andriantsoly reconquered the island in 1836, but his depopulated and unfortified island was in a weak position towards the sultans of Comoros, Malagasy kings, and pirates. Seeking the help of a powerful ally, he began to negotiate with the French, installed in the nearby Malagasy island of Nosy Bé in 1840.

Mayotte was purchased by France in 1841, and integrated to the Crown. In the immediate aftermath, slavery was abolished and laborers were imported to the area to work in fields and plantations. The abolition of slavery led to several slave-owning elites leaving Mayotte as their authority was undermined. However, the freed slaves were often subsequently forced to work under harsher conditions for the French government or colonists in their plantations. Additionally, many of the imported laborers were victims of the slave trade.

Mayotte therefore became a French island, but it remained an island with a sparse population due to decades of wars, as well as by the exodus of former elites and some of their slaves: most of the cities were abandoned, and nature reclaimed the old plantations. The French administration therefore tried to repopulate the island, recalling first of all the Mayotte exiles or refugees in the region (Comoros, Madagascar), proposing the former exiled masters return in exchange for compensation, then by inviting wealthy Anjouan families to come and set up trade. France launched some first major works, such as the realization in 1848 of the Boulevard des Crabes connecting the rock of Dzaoudzi to Pamandzi and the rest of Petite-Terre.

As it had done in the West Indies and Réunion, the French government planned to make Mayotte a sugar island: despite the steep slopes, large plantations were developed, 17 sugar factories were built and hundreds of foreign workers (mainly African, in particular Mozambic Makwas) hired from 1851 onwards. However, production remained mediocre, and the sugar crisis of 1883–1885 quickly led to the end of this crop in Mayotte (which had just reached its peak of production), leaving only a few factory ruins, some of which are still visible now. The last sugar plant to be closed was Dzoumogné in 1955: the best preserved, and now heritage, is Soulou, in the west of the island.

At the Berlin Conference in 1885, France took control over the whole Comoros archipelago, which was actually already ruled by French traders; the colony took the name of "Mayotte and Dependencies".

In 1898, two cyclones razed the island to the ground, and a smallpox epidemic decimated the survivors. Mayotte had to start from the beginning once again, and the French government had to repopulate the island with workers from Mozambique, Comoros and Madagascar. The sugar industry was abandoned, replaced by vanilla, coffee, copra, sisal, then fragrant plants such as vetiver, citronella, sandalwood, and especially ylang-ylang, which later became one of the symbols of the island.

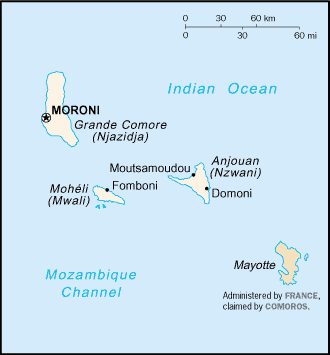
Map of the Comoros Union (three islands on the left) and the Mayotte French department (right)

Mayotte was the only island in the archipelago that voted in referendums in 1974 and 1976 to retain its link with France and forgo independence (with 63.8% and 99.4% of votes respectively). UN General Assembly resolutions, which are legally non-binding, have voted not to recognise France's continued rule of Mayotte, and the independent Comoros have never ceased to claim the island. A draft 1976 United Nations Security Council resolution recognising Comorian sovereignty over Mayotte, supported by 11 of the 15 members of the council, was vetoed by France. It was the only time, as of 2020, that France cast a lone veto in the council; the veto was criticized because France was a party to the dispute before the Security Council, and consequently should have abstained from voting, according to some other Council members. As mentioned, the United Nations General Assembly adopted a series of legally non-binding resolutions on Mayotte, under the pro-Comoros title "Question of the Comorian Island of Mayotte" up until 1995. In the decades since 1995, the subject of Mayotte has not been discussed by the General Assembly, and all the following referendums over Mayotte independence have shown a strong will of Mayotte people to remain French.

Mayotte became an overseas department of France in March 2011 in consequence of a 29 March 2009 referendum. The outcome was a 95.5% vote in favour of changing the island's status from a French "overseas community" to become France's 101st département. Its non-official traditional Islamic law, applied in some aspects of the day-to-day life, will be gradually abolished and replaced by the uniform French civil code. Additionally, French social welfare and taxes apply in Mayotte, though some of each will be brought in gradually. Comoros continues to claim the island, while criticising the French military base there.

In 2018, the department experienced civil unrest over migration from the Comoros.

In December 2024, Cyclone Chido caused extreme damage to Mayotte, destroying most homes, administrative buildings and part of the town hall in the capital Mamoudzou. President Emmanuel Macron arrived on the department's largest island, Grande-Terre, on 19 December, and delivered food and health aid. A state of emergency has been declared for the department.

== Politics ==
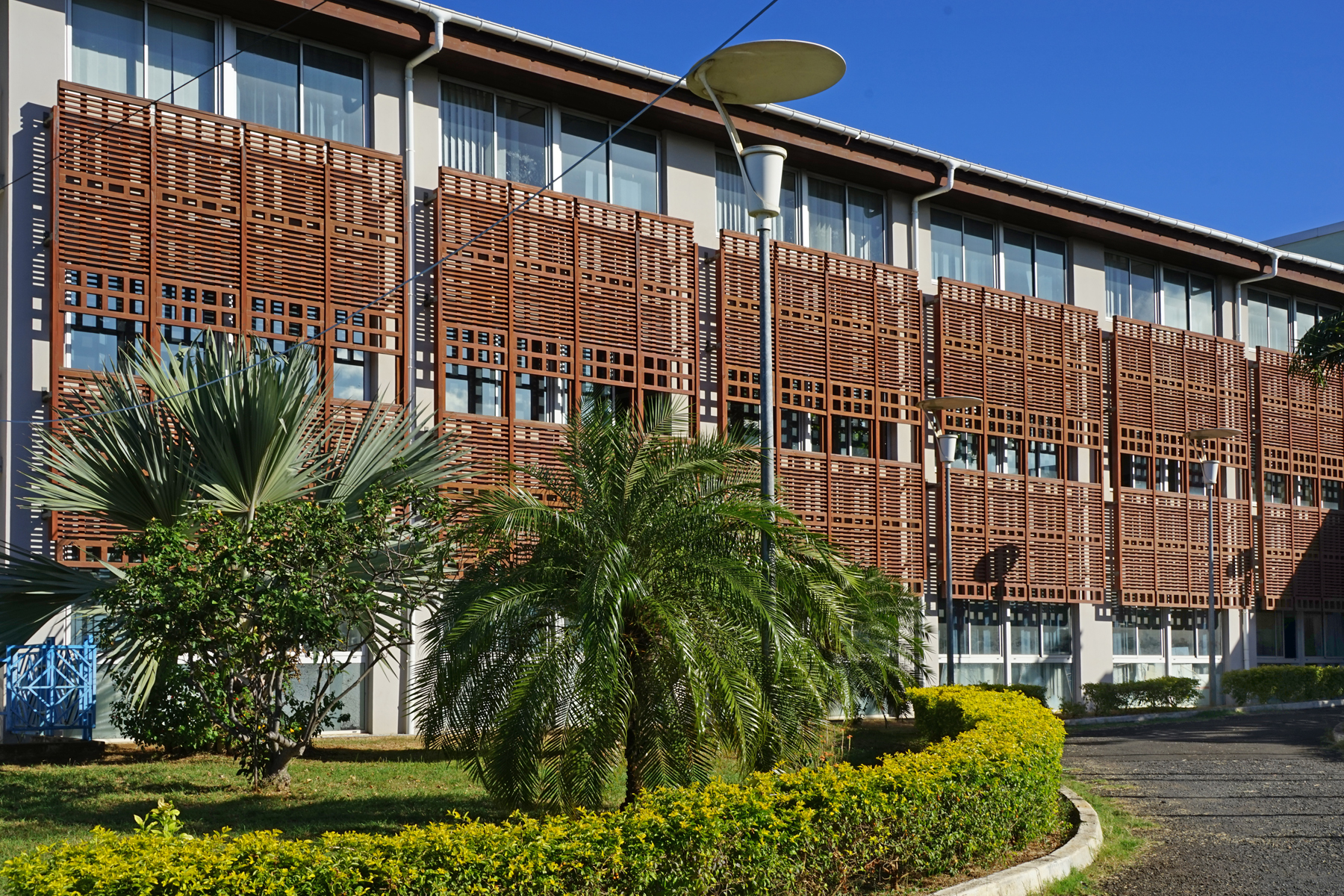
The departmental council in Mamoudzou

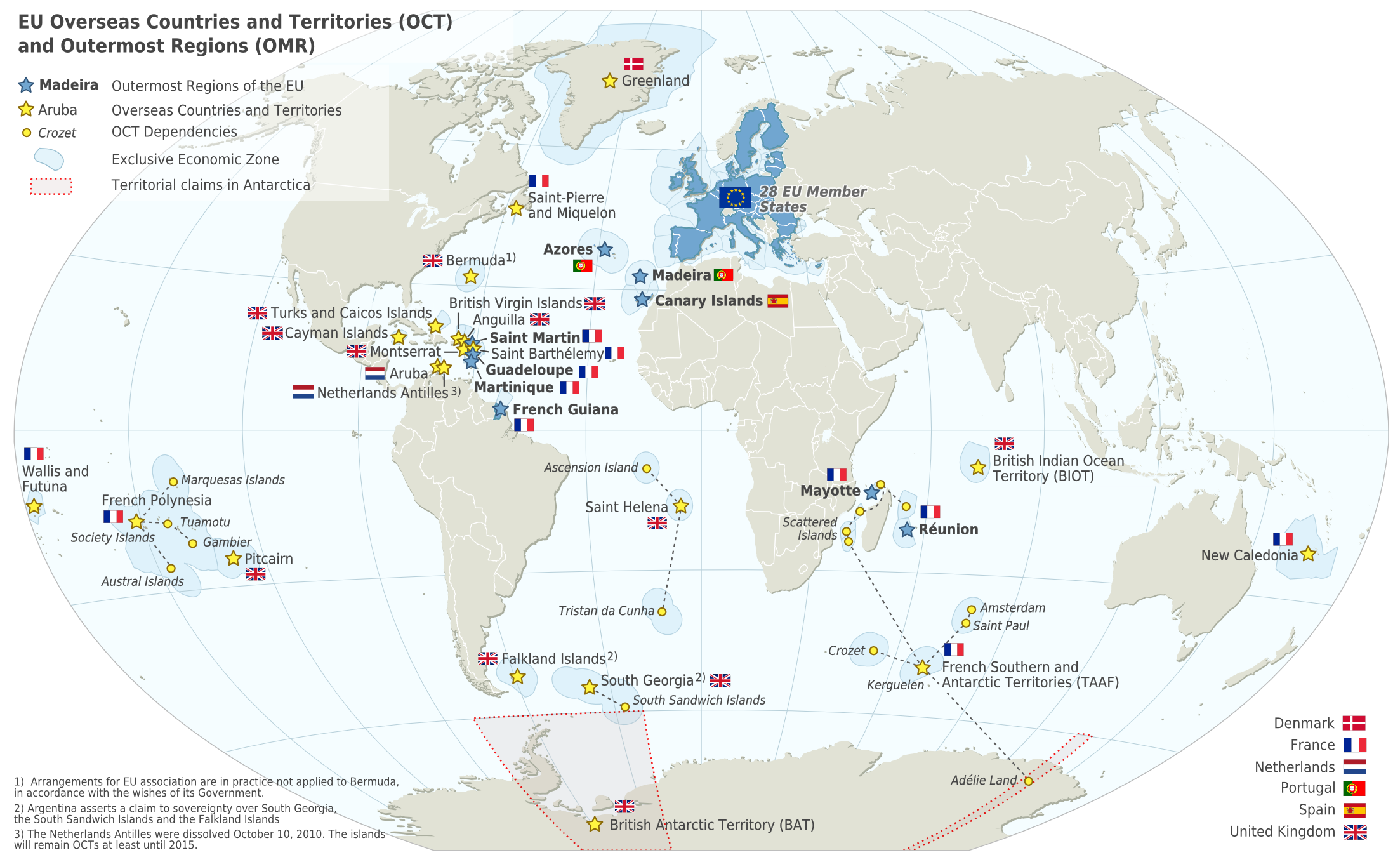
Map of the European Union in the world with overseas countries and territories and outermost regions (prior to Brexit)

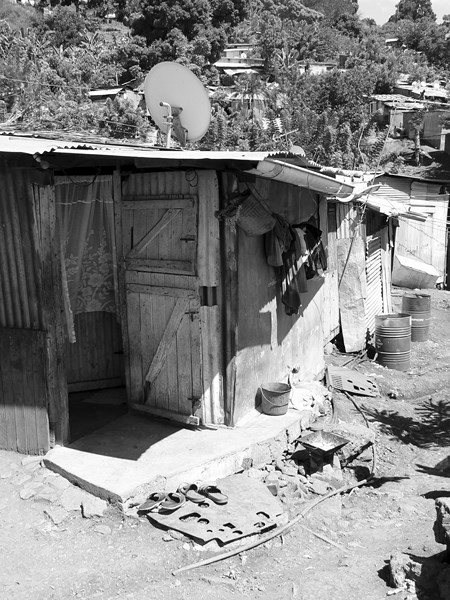
House at Kawéni, dubbed the biggest shantytown of France

The politics of Mayotte takes place in a framework of a parliamentary representative democratic government and of a multi-party system, whereby the President of the Departmental Council is the head of the local assembly. Executive power is exercised by the French government.

Mayotte also sends two deputies to the French National Assembly and two senators to the French Senate. The deputies represent Mayotte's 1st constituency and Mayotte's 2nd constituency.

The situation of Mayotte proved to be awkward for France: while a significant majority of the local population did not want to join the Comoros in becoming independent of France, some post-colonial leftist or Marxist-Leninist governments voiced criticism of Mayotte's ongoing ties to France. Furthermore, the peculiar local administration of Mayotte, largely ruled by customary Muslim law, would be difficult to integrate into the legal structures of France, not to mention the costs of bringing the standards of living to levels close to those of Metropolitan France. For these reasons, the laws passed by the national parliament had to state specifically that they applied to Mayotte.

The status of Mayotte was changed in 2001 towards one very close to the status of the departments of France, with the particular designation of departmental collectivity. This change was approved by 73% of voters in a referendum. After the constitutional reform of 2003 it became an overseas collectivity while retaining the title "departmental collectivity" of Mayotte.

Mayotte became an overseas department of France (département d'outre-mer, DOM) on 31 March 2011 following the result of the March 2009 Mahoran status referendum, which was overwhelmingly approved by around 95% of voters. Becoming an overseas department will mean it will adopt the same legal and social system as used in the rest of France. This will require abandoning some customary laws, adopting the standard French civil code, and reforming the judiciary, educational, social and fiscal systems, and will take place over a period of about 20 years.

Since it became an overseas department in 2011, Mayotte possesses a single local assembly, officially called the "Departmental Council" (conseil départemental), which acts both as a regional and departmental council, or a single territorial collectivity. This was a unique arrangement at the time, but French Guiana and Martinique adopted this arrangement in 2015.

Despite its domestic constitutional evolution from the status of an overseas collectivity to that of an overseas department, effectively becoming a full constituent territory within the French Republic, with regards to the European Union, Mayotte remained an 'overseas country and territory' (OCT) in association with the Union (as per Article 355(2) TFEU) and not a constituent territory of the European Union in the same way as the other four overseas departments. However, following a directive of the European Council in December 2013, Mayotte became an outermost region of the European Union on 1 January 2014. This successful agreement between the 27 member states follows a petition made by the French government for Mayotte to become an integral territory of the European Union nonetheless benefiting from the derogation clause applicable in existing outermost regions, namely Article 349 TFEU, as favoured in a June 2012 European Commission opinion on Mayotte's European constitutional status.

In recent national elections, Mayotte has been a stronghold for the right-wing populist National Rally party, and gave its presidential candidate Marine Le Pen her highest vote percentage in the 2022 French presidential election first round. While the party tries to restrict Islamic practice in continental France, the message in Mayotte is against immigration, not Islam. This explains its success in this Muslim-majority territory.

== Defence ==
Defence of the territory is the responsibility of the French Armed Forces, principally carried out by the 5th Foreign Infantry Regiment of the French Foreign Legion. One Engins de Débarquement Amphibie – Standards (EDA-S) landing craft (Épée) is to be delivered to naval forces based in Mayotte by 2025. The landing craft will replace a CTM landing craft currently deployed in the territory, to better support coastal operations.

About 170 personnel of the National Gendarmerie are stationed in Mayotte while, as of late 2022, the Maritime Gendarmerie operated the patrol boats Odet and Verdon in the territory. In December 2024, both boats were severely damaged by Cyclone Chido. Reports suggested that they might both be beyond repair and would need to be replaced. In early 2025 a sister ship of the two vessels, the patrol boat Adour, was transferred to Mayotte from Metropolitan France as a preliminary replacement.

== Administrative divisions ==
Mayotte is divided into 17 communes. There are also 13 cantons (not shown here). It is the only department and region of France without an arrondissement.

Number on Map	Name	Area (km^{2})	Population	Individual map	Labelled map
1	Dzaoudzi	6.66	17,831		
2	Pamandzi	4.29	11,442		
3	Mamoudzou	41.94	71,437		
4	Dembeni	38.8	15,848		
5	Bandrélé	36.46	10,282		
6	Kani-Kéli	20.51	5,507		
7	Bouéni	14.06	6,189		
8	Chirongui	28.31	8,920		
9	Sada	11.16	11,156		
10	Ouangani	19.05	10,203		
11	Chiconi	8.29	8,295		
12	Tsingoni	34.76	13,934		
13	M'Tsangamouji	21.84	6,432		
14	Acoua	12.62	5,192		
15	Mtsamboro	13.71	7,705		
16	Bandraboua	32.37	13,989		
17	Koungou	28.41	32,156		

== Transport ==
- Waterways
  - Ferry between Dzaoudzi and Mamoudzou.
- Highways:
  - Total: 93 kilometres (58 mi)
    - Paved: 72 kilometres (45 mi)
    - Unpaved: 21 kilometres (13 mi)
- Ports and harbours:
  - Dzaoudzi
  - "Longoni" (Koungou)
- Airport: Dzaoudzi Pamandzi International Airport
  - With paved runways: 1 (2002)

== Economy ==
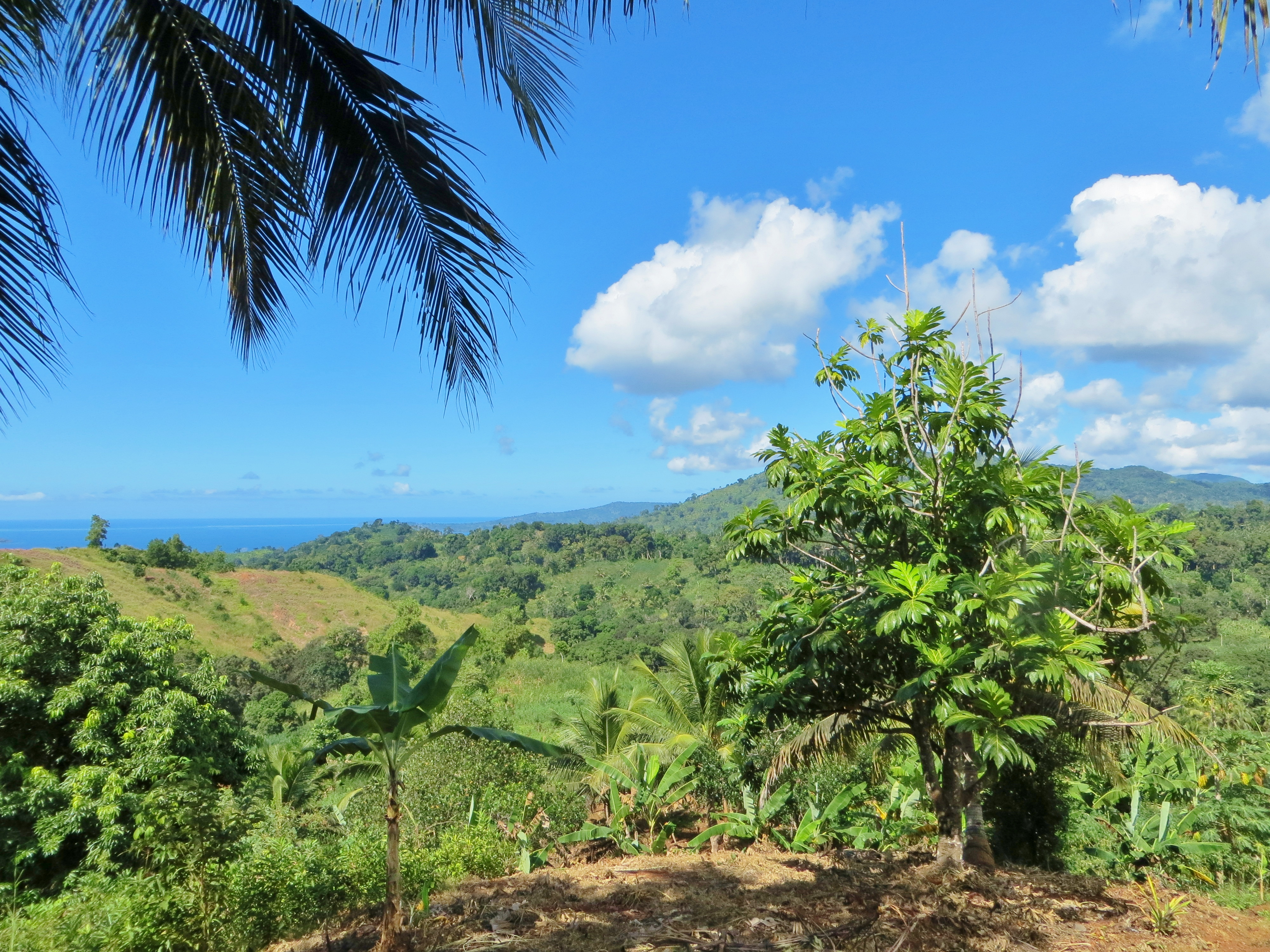
Agricultural landscape of Mayotte, containing most of the typical crops: coconut trees, bananas, breadfruit, papaya tree, mango trees, and manioc

The official currency in Mayotte is the euro.

In 2019, the GDP of Mayotte at market exchange rates was €2.66 billion (US$2.98 bn). In that same year the GDP per capita of Mayotte at market exchange rates, not at PPP, was €9,692 (US$10,850), which was eight times larger than the GDP per capita of the Comoros that year, but only 42.8% of the GDP per capita of Réunion and 26.4% of the GDP per capita of Metropolitan France. Living standards are therefore lower than in metropolitan France. At the 2017 census, 10% of dwellings in Mayotte had no electricity, 29% of dwellings had no running water inside the dwelling, and 54% of dwellings had no toilets inside the dwelling.

GDP (nominal) per capita in 2019 (US$)
$500–1,000 $1,000–2,000 $2,000–5,000 $5,000–10,000 $10,000–20,000

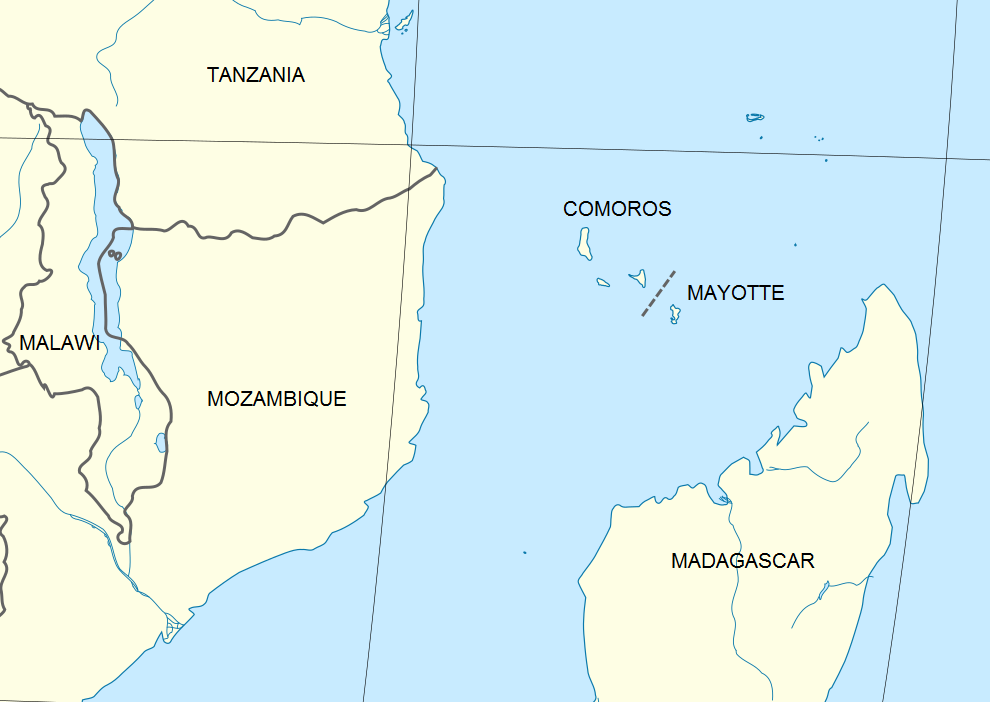

The economy of Mayotte has grown significantly since the end of the 20th century due to financial transfers from the French central state and the gradual transformation of the territory into a full-fledged French department after a 2009 referendum, with considerable upgrading of public services and infrastructure.

The economy of Mayotte grew by an average of +9.3% per year in real terms from 2001 to 2008, before being affected by the 2008 financial crisis and experiencing as a result a recession of −0.4% in 2009. The economy rebounded as early as 2010, driven by the transformation of the territory into an overseas department, decided in a referendum in 2009 and taking effect in 2011. From 2010 to 2017, the economy of Mayotte grew on average by +6.9% per year in real terms, but economic growth slowed to +2.1% in 2018 due to the massive civil unrest experienced by the territory that year, with weeks of demonstrations, roadblocks, and work stoppages paralyzing Mayotte's economy between January and April 2018. Economic growth rebounded to +5.2% in 2019, but Mayotte was affected by the COVID-19 pandemic in 2020, with growth estimated at only +1.1% in 2020.

Thanks to rapid economic growth, Mayotte has begun to catch up with the rest of France in terms of standards of living. Despite high population growth, Mayotte's GDP per capita managed to rise from 15.4% of Metropolitan France's level in 2000 to 27.3% of Metropolitan France in 2017, but this catching-up process has stalled since 2018 due to the civil unrest that took place in Mayotte that year and its economic consequences. Compared to Réunion, Mayotte's GDP per capita rose from 28.7% of Réunion's level in 2000 to 43.7% in 2017, before falling back slightly.

The unemployment rate for youth ages 15–29 is 43%. The overall unemployment rate is 30%. 8 out of 10 children in Mayotte live in poverty.

Regional GDP of Mayotte (in euros, current prices)
	2000	2005	2010	2015	2016	2017	2018	2019
Nominal GDP (€ bn)	0.56	0.92	1.43	2.08	2.21	2.42	2.50	2.66
GDP per capita (euros)	3,800	5,300	7,100	8,800	9,000	9,500	9,400	9,700
GDP per capita as a % of Metropolitan France's	15.4%	18.7%	22.8%	26.2%	26.5%	27.3%	26.4%	26.4%
GDP per capita as a % of Réunion's	28.7%	31.0%	38.1%	42.6%	42.5%	43.7%	42.6%	42.8%
Sources: Eurostat; INSEE.

The local agriculture is threatened by insecurity, and due to a more expensive workforce cannot compete on the export ground with Madagascar or the Comoros union. The major economic potential of the island remains tourism, however hampered by delinquency rates.

== Demographics ==
Historical population
Year	Pop.	±% p.a.
1958	23,364	—
1966	32,607	+3.94%
1978	47,246	+3.17%
1985	67,205	+5.09%
1991	94,410	+5.81%
1997	131,320	+5.67%
2002	160,265	+4.08%
2007	186,452	+3.07%
2012	212,645	+2.63%
2017	256,518	+3.79%
2024	320,901	+3.61%
Official population figures from past censuses up to 2017. Last INSEE 2024 estimate.

On 1 January 2024, a record 320,901 people were living in Mayotte (official INSEE estimate). According to the 2017 census, 58.5% of the people living in Mayotte were born in Mayotte (down from 63.5% at the 2007 census), 5.6% were born in the rest of the French Republic (either metropolitan France or overseas France except Mayotte) (up from 4.8% in 2007), and 35.8% were immigrants born in foreign countries (up from 31.7% at the 2007 census, with the following countries of birth in 2007: 28.3% born in the Union of the Comoros, 2.6% in Madagascar, and the remaining 0.8% in other countries).

According to a field study conducted by INSEE in 2015–2016, only 35.6% of the adults (18 years of age and older) living in Mayotte were born in Mayotte of mothers themselves born in Mayotte, whereas 37.4% of the adults were either born in Anjouan (in the Union of the Comoros) or born in Mayotte of mothers born in Anjouan, 13.5% were either born in Grande Comore or Mohéli (in the Union of the Comoros) or born in Mayotte of mothers born in Grande Comore or Mohéli, 7.9% were either born in France (outside of Mayotte) or in Mayotte of mothers born in France (outside of Mayotte), and 5.7% were either born in foreign countries (other than the Comoros) or in Mayotte of mothers born in foreign countries (other than the Comoros).

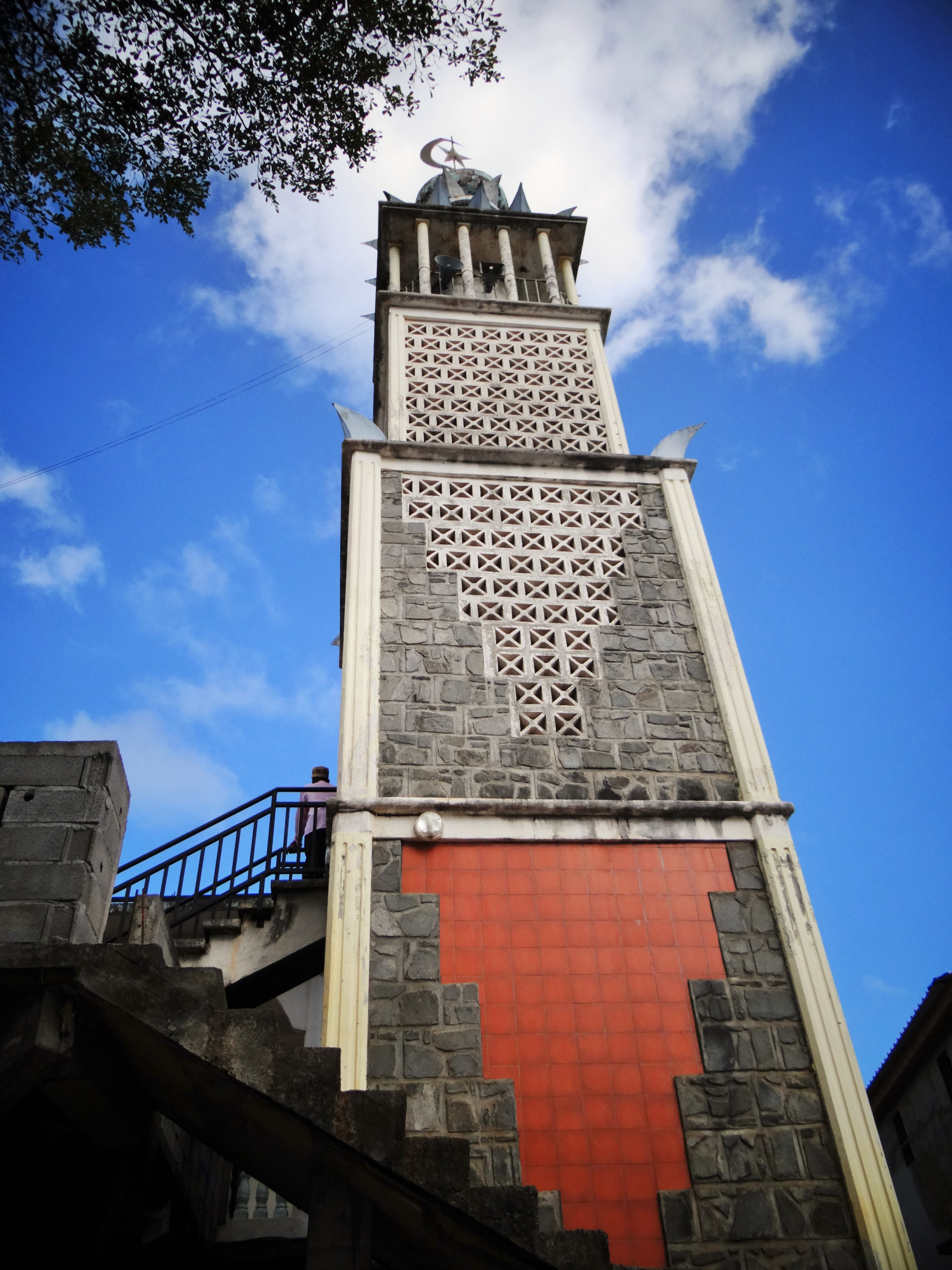
Tsingoni Mosque is the oldest active mosque in France.

Most of the inhabitants of the island are culturally Comorians. The Comorians are a blend of settlers from many areas: South Arabs, Bantus, and Malagasy. Comorian communities can also be found in other parts of the Comoros chain as well as in Madagascar.

In 2017, mothers born in foreign countries (predominantly the Union of the Comoros) were responsible for 75.7% of the births that took place in Mayotte although many of these births were to French fathers: 58% of children born in Mayotte in 2017 had at least one French parent.

Illegal immigration is a huge problem in Mayotte. French Minister for Overseas Territories, Manuel Valls, has called immigration "a plague" that is "gradually killing" the island. The citizenship laws have been amended, and radar has been introduced.

=== Religions ===
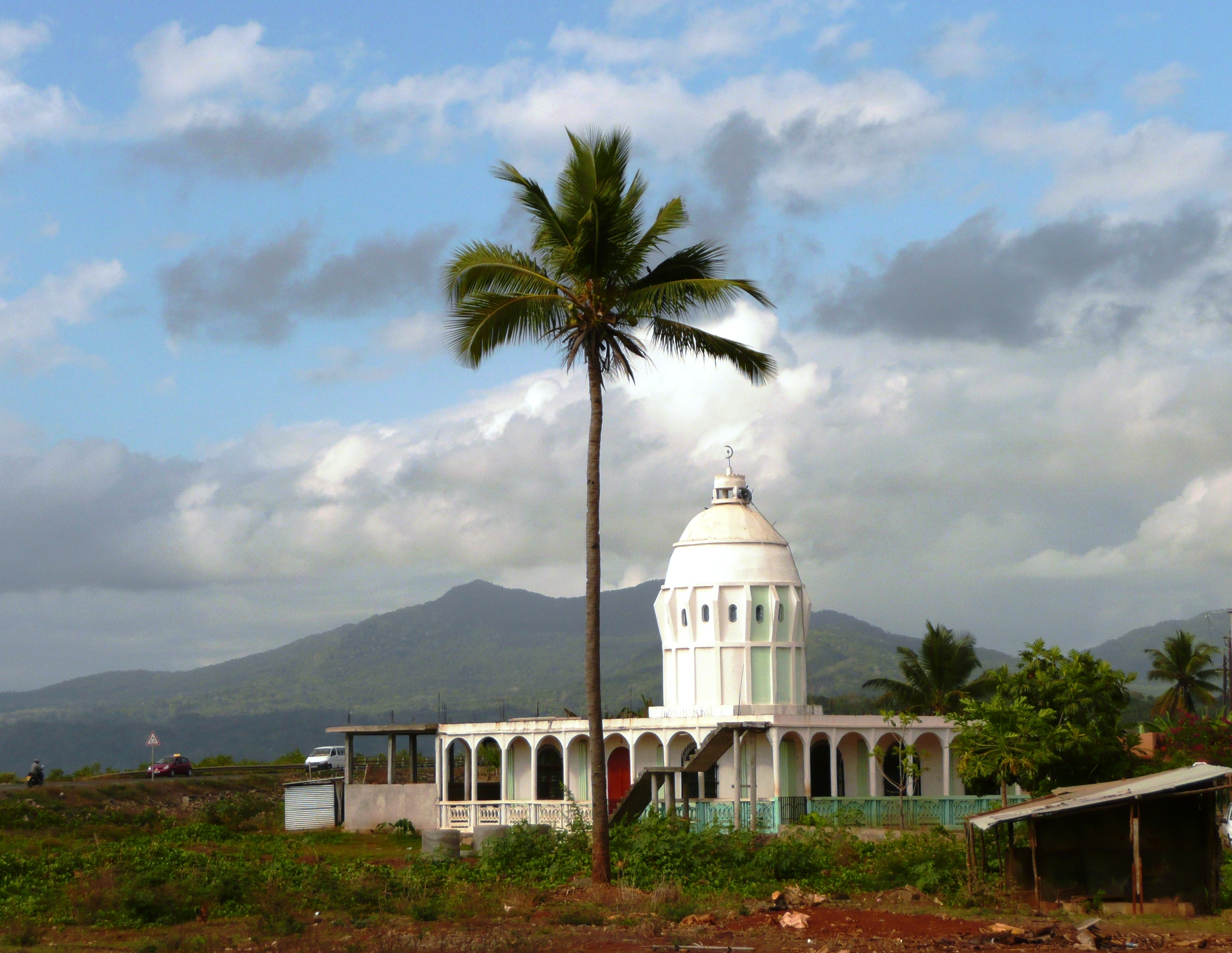
Passamaïnty mosque

The largest religion in Mayotte is Islam. The French census does not collect religious data, but the CIA World Factbook estimates that the population is 97% Muslim and 3% Christian.

The main religious minority, Roman Catholicism, has no proper diocese but is served, together with the Comoros, by a missionary jurisdiction, the Apostolic Vicariate of Comoros Archipelago.

=== Languages ===
French is the sole official language of Mayotte. It is the language used for administration, education, most television, and radio, as well as in commercial announcements and billboards. The native languages of Mayotte are:

- Shimaore, a dialect of Comorian (a close relative of Swahili)
- Kibushi, a western dialect of Malagasy (the predominant language of Madagascar) heavily influenced by Shimaore and Arabic
- Kiantalaotsi, another western dialect of the Malagasy language also heavily influenced by Shimaore and Arabic

Kibushi is spoken in the south and north-west of Mayotte, while Shimaore is spoken elsewhere.

Besides French, other non-indigenous languages are also present in Mayotte:

- Arabic, essentially learned in the Quranic schools
- various non-Shimaore dialects of the Comorian language, essentially imported by immigrants who have arrived in Mayotte since 1974: Shindzwani (the dialect of Anjouan, or Nzwani), Shingazidja (the dialect of Grande Comore, or Ngazidja), and Shimwali (the dialect of Mohéli, or Mwali).

Shingazidja and Shimwali on the one hand and Shimaore on the other hand are generally not mutually intelligible. Shindzwani and Shimaore are perfectly mutually intelligible.

==== 2012 and 2017 censuses ====
No questions regarding the knowledge or use of languages were asked in the 2012 and 2017 censuses, and no question relative to languages will be asked in the future censuses of Mayotte, leaving the now quite outdated census data from 2007 as the last official data on the topic of languages. Improvement in schooling has markedly increased French literacy and knowledge since 2007.

==== 2007 census ====
At the 2007 census, 63.2% of people 14 years old and older reported that they could speak French, with large differences with age. 87.1% of those whose age was 14 to 19 years old reported that they could speak it, whereas only 19.6% of those aged 65 and older reported that they could speak it. 93.8% of the population whose age was 14 or older reported that they could speak one of the local languages of Mayotte (Shimaore, Kibushi, Kiantalaotsi, or any of the Comorian dialects, which the census included in the 'local languages'). 6.2% of the population aged 14 and older reported that they spoke none of the local languages and could speak only French.

==== 2006 survey ====
A survey was conducted by the French Ministry of National Education in 2006 among pupils registered in CM2 (equivalent to fifth grade in the US and Year 6 in England and Wales). Questions were asked regarding the languages spoken by the pupils as well as the languages spoken by their parents. According to the survey, the ranking of mother tongues was the following (ranked by number of first language speakers in the total population; note that percentages add up to more than 100% because some people are natively bilingual):

- Shimaore: 55.1%
- Shindzwani: 22.3%
- Kibushi: 13.6%
- Shingazidja: 7.9%
- French: 1.4%
- Shimwali: 0.8%
- Arabic: 0.4%
- Kiantalaotsi: 0.2%
- Other: 0.4%

When also counting second language speakers (e.g., someone whose mother tongue is Shimaore but who also speaks French as a second language) then the ranking became: " Shimaore: 88.3% " French: 56.9% " Shindzwani: 35.2% " Kibushi: 28.8% " Shingazidja: 13.9% " Arabic: 10.8% " Shimwali: 2.6% " Kiantalaotsi: 0.9% " Other: 1.2%

With the mandatory schooling of children and the economic development both implemented by the French central state, the French language has progressed significantly on Mayotte in recent years. The survey conducted by the Ministry of National Education showed that while first and second language speakers of French represented 56.9% of the population in general, this figure was only 37.7% for the parents of CM2 pupils, but reached 97.0% for the CM2 pupils themselves (whose age is between 10 and 14 in general).

Nowadays there are instances of families speaking only French to their children in the hope of helping their social advancement. With French schooling and French-language television, many young people turn to French or use many French words when speaking Shimaore and Kibushi, leading some to fear that these native languages of Mayotte could either disappear or become some sort of French-based creole.

== Notable people ==
- Abdou Baco (born ca. 1965), writer and founder of the musical group Mobissa
- Toifilou Maoulida (born 1979), French former footballer who played 556 games
- Manou Mansour (born 1980), French poet
- El Fardou Ben Nabouhane (born 1989), Comorian footballer

=== Politicians ===
- Marcel Henry (1926–2021), politician, French senator from 1977 to 2004
- Soibahadine Ibrahim Ramadani (born 1949), politician, former senator
- Nourdine Bourhane (born 1950), former senior politician
- Ibrahim Aboubacar (born 1965), politician at the French National Assembly
- Thomas Degos (born 1971), Prefect of Mayotte from 2011 to 2013

== Culture ==
=== Sport ===
Mayotte competes at the quadrennial Indian Ocean Island Games. Football is popular, with teams from the territory playing in the Coupe de France.

=== Education ===
Education in Mayotte faces challenges. Mayotte has the worst educational outcomes in France. 1/3rd of the youth population are not in school, many from disadvantaged and immigrant backgrounds. According to the Ministry of National Education, over 70% face difficulty reading. A study from the University of Paris-Nanterre in 2023 found that up to 9 percent of Mayotte's school-age population were not enrolled in school. Schools are often overcrowded, and disruptions because of natural disasters worsen the situation.

== Tourism ==
The island of Mayotte, which has very varied coastal relief, offers fewer sandy beaches than its neighbors Grande Comore, Mohéli, the Seychelles, Mauritius, and Madagascar, but has a greater diversity of coastlines and sand colors (black, brown, gray, red, beige, and white). Its lagoon is the largest (1,500 km^{2} (580 sq mi)) and deepest in this part of the world (and one of the largest on the planet), and its double barrier reef is a biological curiosity that has only a dozen occurrences on the planet, hosting a great diversity of animals, including large cetaceans, which is extremely rare.

Some tourist activities include:

- Hiking to the extinct volcano Dziani Dzaha of Petite-Terre and its lake Dziani;
- Hiking to Mount Combani and Mount Choungui;
- Trek to the governor's house;
- Observation of the maki lemurs of the M'Bouzy islet;
- Diving and snorkelling on the coral reef among tropical fish in the "Passe en S", in N'Gouja, Saziley or on the outer barrier;
- The lagoon allows the observation of green and hawksbill turtles (which come to lay their eggs on deserted beaches), dolphins (common long-billed, spotted, and tursiops in particular), and whales and their calves (which give birth there);
- Nautical activities or relaxation on the many beaches of Mayotte;
- Swimming and visits to the isolated beaches of the northern and southern white sand islets;
- Bivouacs on the deserted islands;
- The Soulou waterfall, on the beach of the same name, is a natural curiosity;
- The Badamiers mudflat, in Petite-Terre, is a marsh rich in biodiversity and landscapes;
- The wrecks like that of the sailing schooner Dwyn Wen in front of the Badamiers (two masts of which are still standing out of the water);
- The tour of the island by microlight allows you to observe the reefs from the sky;
- The museum of Mayotte, the MuMa at Dzaoudzi, labeled Musée de France.

== See also ==
- Outline of Mayotte
- 2008 invasion of Anjouan
- Administrative divisions of France
- List of colonial and departmental heads of Mayotte
- Communications in Mayotte
- Islam in Mayotte
- Islands administered by France in the Indian and Pacific oceans
- Music of the Comoro Islands

== Bibliography ==
- Hawlitschek, Oliver; Eudeline, Rémy; Rouillé, Antoine (2020). Terrestrial fauna of the Comoros Archipelago. Saint-Joseph, Réunion: Antoine Rouillé. ISBN 979-10-699-5956-9. OCLC 1240355231.
