= Mayotte's 1st constituency =

Constituency of the French Fifth Republic

1st constituency of Mayotte
- inline Constituency of the National Assembly of France

- Constituency within Mayotte

- Location of Mayotte
- Deputy: Estelle Youssouffa; SE
- Department: Mayotte
- Cantons: Acoua, Bandraboua, Dzaoudzi, Koungou, Mamoudzou-1, Mamoudzou-2, Mtsamboro et Pamandzi.
- Registered voters: 45,660

The 1st constituency of Mayotte is a French legislative constituency on the island of Mayotte.

== Deputies ==
Election	Member	Party
1988	Henry Jean-Baptiste	UDF
1993	Henry Jean-Baptiste	UDF
1997	Henry Jean-Baptiste	UDF
2002	Mansour Kamardine	UMP
2007	Abdoulatifou Aly	MoDem
2012	Boinali Saïd	DVG
2017	Ramlati Ali	PS
2018	Ramlati Ali	DVG / LREM
2022	Estelle Youssouffa	SE
2024	Estelle Youssouffa	SE

== Election results ==
=== 2024 ===
Candidate	Party	First round	
Candidate	Party	Votes	%
Estelle Youssouffa	DVD	13,640	79.48
Kambi Said Said	DVD	2,513	14.64
Mikhaël Saify	LO	684	3.99
Aurélia Maillard	REC	325	1.89
Valid votes		17,162	100.00
Blank votes		417	2.30
Null votes		543	3.00
Turnout		18,122	39.69
Abstentions		27,538	60.31
Registered voters		45,660	
Result		DVD HOLD	

=== 2022 ===
Legislative Election 2022: Mayotte's 1st constituency
Party	Candidate	Votes	%	±%
DIV	Estelle Youssouffa	3,471	21.04	N/A
DIV	Théophane Narayanin	2,920	17.70	N/A
DVG	Ahamadi Boura	2,596	15.74	N/A
LR (UDC)	Issihaka Abdillah	1,398	14.54	−2.22
DVG (NUPÉS)	Yasmina Aouny	1,409	8.54	−10.28
DVC	Mohamed Moindjie	1,194	7.24	N/A
LREM (Ensemble)	Ramlati Ali	1,194	7.24	N/A
DVD	Elad Chakrina	1,178	7.14	N/A
DIV	Ismaila Djaza	124	0.75	N/A
DIV	Antoine Autran	12	0.07	N/A
Turnout		16,496	41.15	−0.87
2nd round result
DIV	Estelle Youssouffa	12,180	66.57	N/A
DIV	Théophane Narayanin	6,116	33.43	N/A
Turnout		18,296	45.41	−0.09
DIV gain from DVG				

=== 2018 by-election result ===
First round results by commune

Second round results by commune

Candidate	Party	First round			Second round		
Candidate	Party	Votes	%	+/–	Votes	%	+/–
Ramlati Ali	DVG	3,875	36.15	+19.31	8,246	54.77	+4.60
Elad Chakrina	LR	3,493	32.59	+15.83	6,810	45.23	–4.60
Bacar Ali Boto	DVG	1,338	12.48	–3.14			
Daniel Zaïdani	MDM	1,305	12.17	–1.22			
Abdullah Mikidadi	FI	280	2.61	+0.63			
Alexandre Alçuyet	UPR	189	1.76	+1.09			
Bacar Mouta	DVG	178	1.66	+1.66			
Boina Dinouraini	SE	61	0.57	–1.29			
Votes		10,719	100.00	–	15,056	100.00	–
Valid votes		10,719	90.52	+1.97	15,056	93.89	+1.69
Blank votes		460	3.88	–0.11	381	2.38	–0.88
Null votes		662	5.59	–1.86	598	3.73	–0.80
Turnout		11,841	30.39	–11.90	16,035	41.36	–4.15
Abstentions		27,127	69.61	+11.90	22,733	58.64	+4.15
Registered voters		38,968			38,768		
Source (1st round): Préfecture de Mayotte, Ministère de l'Intérieur; Source (2nd round): Préfecture de Mayotte, Ministère de l'Intérieur

=== 2017 election result ===
First round results by commune

Second round results by commune

Candidate	Party	First round		Second round	
Candidate	Party	Votes	%	Votes	%
Ramlati Ali	PS	2,396	16.84	7,992	50.17
Elad Chakrina	LR	2,384	16.76	7,938	49.83
Bacar Ali Boto	DVG	2,223	15.62		
Daniel Zaïdani	DVD	1,906	13.40		
Youssouf Chihabouddine	DVG	944	6.63		
Yahaya Moutuidine	SE	803	5.64		
Kamel Messaoudi	SE	723	5.08		
Bacar Haladi	PRG	651	4.58		
Saïd Ahamadi	DVG	573	4.03		
Soihibou Ali-Mansoib	FN	438	3.08		
Boinali Saïd*	DVG	371	2.61		
Christine Raharijaona	FI	282	1.98		
Boina Dinouraini	SE	264	1.86		
Saïd Ahamadi Salim	SE	174	1.22		
Catherine Bihannic	UPR	96	0.67		
Votes		14,228	100.00	15,930	100.00
Valid votes		14,228	88.55	15,930	92.21
Blank votes		642	4.00	563	3.26
Null votes		1,197	7.45	783	4.53
Turnout		16,067	42.28	17,276	45.52
Abstentions		21,930	57.72	20,680	54.48
Registered voters		37,997		37,956	
Source: Ministry of the Interior, political parties * Incumbent deputy

=== 2012 ===
2012 legislative election in Mayotte's 1st constituency
Candidate	Party	First round		Second round	
Candidate	Party	Votes	%	Votes	%
Saïd Omar Oili	DVG	3,337	21.57%	6,707	41.00%
Boinali Said	DVG	2,919	18.86%	9,653	59.00%
Ali-Mohamed Ben Ali	??	2,607	16.85%		
Mohamadi Soumaila	UMP	2,264	14.63%		
Ramlati Ali	PS	1,235	7.98%		
Bacar Ali Boto	DVG	1,008	6.51%		
Saïd Ahamadi	DVG	632	4.08%		
Bacar Haladi	DVG	340	2.20%		
Eugène Felix	PR	276	1.78%		
Franck Madjid	DVD	194	1.25%		
Lucinda Carvalho	FN	189	1.22%		
Toiha Minihaji	DVG	143	0.92%		
Abdoulatifou Aly	MoDem	127	0.82%		
Saïd Ahamada	DVG	115	0.74%		
Mohamed Brahime Dit Monsieur Chirac	DVD	88	0.57%		
Valid votes		15,474	95.05%	16,360	95.67%
Spoilt and null votes		806	4.95%	740	4.33%
Votes cast / turnout		16,280	45.73%	17,100	48.03%
Abstentions		19,321	54.27%	18,503	51.97%
Registered voters		35,601	100.00%	35,603	100.00%

=== 2007 ===
Legislative Election 2007: Mayotte 1st - 2nd round
Party	Candidate	Votes	%	±%
MoDem	Abdoulatifou Aly	18,789	56.29	
UMP	Mansour Kamardine	14,590	43.71	
Turnout		34,652	53.55	
MoDem gain from UMP		Swing		

=== 2002 ===
Legislative Election 2002: Mayotte 1st - 2nd round
Party	Candidate	Votes	%	±%
UMP	Mansour Kamardine	17,001	54.61	
UDF	Vita Siadi	14,133	45.39	
Turnout		31,936	61.02	
UMP hold		Swing		

== See also ==
- Politics of Mayotte

== Sources ==
- French Interior Ministry results website: "Résultats électoraux officiels en France" (in French).
