= 2018 Mayotte's 1st constituency by-election =

← 2017	18 March 2018 (first round); 25 March 2018 (second round)	2022 →
- Turnout: 30.39% (first round) ▼11.90pp 41.36% (second round) ▼4.15pp

Nominee	Ramlati Ali	Elad Chakrina
Party	DVG	LR
Popular vote	8,246	6,810
Percentage	54.77%	45.23%
Deputy before election
Ramlati Ali
LREM
Elected deputy
Ramlati Ali
DVG

A by-election was held in Mayotte's 1st constituency on 18 March 2018, with a second round on 25 March as no candidate secured a majority of votes in the first round. The by-election was called after the Constitutional Council invalidated the election of Ramlati Ali, candidate of the Socialist Party (PS) in the June 2017 legislative elections and member of the La République En Marche group in the National Assembly, on 19 January 2018.

In the second round on 25 March, Ali was re-elected with 55% of the vote.

== Background ==
On the evening of 18 June 2017, Elad Chakrina, candidate of The Republicans (LR), was initially declared the winner of the second round of voting in the legislative elections with 50.04% of votes, with 12 votes separating him from his opponent Ramlati Ali, candidate of the Socialist Party (PS). On 19 June, the result was overturned and Ramlati Ali was declared the winner with 50.17% of the vote, defeating Elad Chakrina by a margin of 54 votes. Elad Chakrina subsequently announced his intention to file an appeal to the Constitutional Council, alleging electoral fraud, claiming that results reported late in the evening from the commune of Bandraboua were "completely falsified". He also claimed that there were also a number of other irregularities that took place, including that a number of proxy votes cast were fraudulent, problematic electoral rolls, ballots that should have been voided, and ballots cast under the names of deceased individuals.

On 19 January 2018, the constitutional council annulled the election of Ramlati Ali on the basis of several complaints, triggering a by-election within the constituency. The decision noted that 25 fewer signatures were found on the electoral roll than the number of ballots found in the ballot boxes in the communes of Mamoudzou, Acoua, Dzaoudzi, Bandraboua, and Mtsamboro. Members of the polling station in Dzaoudzi attempted to rectify an irregularly cast vote by randomly discarding an envelope from the ballot box before counting began, a procedure considered doubly irregular by the constitutional council. Chakrina also claimed at least 40 proxy votes were irregularly cast in Bandraboua on 9 and 16 June 2017, and provided documents relating into a judicial investigation that had been opened to look into the matter.

In addition, Elad Chakrina alleged that Ramlati Ali breached article L. 49 of the electoral code by continuing to conduct her electoral campaign on the Internet through the day of voting, producing three screenshots of a Facebook page of Ramlati Ali's substitute urging people to vote. The constitutional council agreed with this complaint. Chakrina also alleged that Ali's campaign was improperly supported by calls to vote published on 17 June on Ali's Facebook page, among others.

A by-election must be held within three months of the invalidation of the election, as stipulated by article L.O. 178 of the electoral code. Although elected as a member of the Socialist Party, Ramlati Ali joined the La République En Marche group in the National Assembly after her election. Following the decision of the constitutional council, the only two remaining members of the La République En Marche group in the National Assembly representing overseas France are Olivier Serva are Stéphane Claireaux.

On 3 February 2018, the first round of the by-election was scheduled for 18 March 2018, with a second round on 25 March should no candidate secure a majority of votes in the first round. Prospective candidates needed to submit declarations of their candidacies between 19 and 23 February. Polling stations will be open from 8:00 to 18:00 EAT.

== Candidates and campaign ==
Incumbent deputy Ramlati Ali, a 56-year-old former mayor of Pamandzi and head of the medicine, psychiatry and rehabilitation department at the Mayotte Hospital Centre (CHM) who joined La République En Marche! after her election in June 2017, presented herself as a candidate. Ali was placed under formal investigation on 13 February 2018, charged with "complicity in electoral fraud". However, no verdict will be rendered in the case until after the by-election. Due to the judicial affair, Ali did not receive the support of La République En Marche in the by-election, and presented her candidacy without the backing of any party. After the second round, La République En Marche announced its support for Ali in the second round without acknowledging the charges against her. Elad Chakrina, a 37-year-old lawyer and municipal councillor from Tsingoni, contested the constituency once more under the banner of The Republicans (LR) after his successful appeal. During a three-day visit from 5 to 7 March, LR president Laurent Wauquiez denounced the "abandonment" of Mayotte by Macron, saying that the department was "submerged by illegal immigration". On 15 March, Marine Le Pen, president of the National Front (FN), called upon the Mahorais to vote for the LR candidate; though the party neither officially endorsed nor rejected the support of the FN, several LR personalities rejected the FN's support for Chakrina.

Bacar Ali Boto, first deputy mayor of Mamoudzou, contested the by-election without the support of any party. Daniel Zaïdani, the departmental councillor of Pamandzi and former president of the general council of Mayotte charged for embezzlement of public funds in February 2017, was selected by the Movement for the Development of Mayotte (MDM) as its candidate in the by-election after meeting to reconcile divisions within the party. Abdullah Mikidadi initially stood without the support of any party, but later received the backing of La France Insoumise, with deputy Jean-Hugues Ratenon taking the opportunity to offer his support for Mikidadi on a visit to Mayotte on 22 February, and Member of the European Parliament Younous Omarjee also traveling to the department. Catherine Bihannic was initially announced as the candidate of the Popular Republican Union (UPR), as in June, but was ultimately replaced by Alexandre Alçuyet, with Bihannic becoming substitute. Boina Dinouraini stood again as an independent candidate, and miscellaneous left candidate Bacar Mouta, a youth of the Social Mahorais Party, also contested the by-election.

Large protests erupted across Mayotte in the weeks preceding the by-election, with demonstrations against insecurity, violence, and illegal immigration, especially from neighboring Comoros, paralyzing the department, prompting Minister for Overseas France Annick Girardin to promise reinforcements and to visit after the by-election. Saïd Omar Oili, president of the association of mayors of Mayotte, announced the closure town halls in protest, and warned that the by-election might be threatened by the unrest. Despite the threats by several mayors not to hold the by-election, government spokesman Benjamin Griveaux insisted that it would be held regardless. The candidates in the by-election were reluctant to act, unsure how to respond to the protests. On 13 March, the mayors of Mayotte arrived at an "agreement in principle" to hold the by-election after talks with the government and local collectives produced promises to improve security and combat illegal immigration, and unions and collectives agreed to remove roadblocks on the island. Salim Nahouda, general secretary of the General Confederation of Labour (CGT) in Mayotte, stated that 13 of 15 measures proposed by the union were accepted by the government.

Trade unions and collectives called to boycott the vote. Although mayors requested the postponement of the by-election due to security concerns and the difficulty of campaigning, the by-election ultimately went ahead, albeit with certain difficulties due to roadblocks, transport issues, padlocked polling stations, and landslides caused by tropical storm Eliakim, all of which caused delays to opening of polling stations in several communes. Police were forced to open one padlocked polling station in Acoua by force. By 10:15, all polling stations were open. In Mtsamboro, two ballot boxes were stolen in the early afternoon, and a few hours later police later took the thieves into custody and recovered the ballot boxes.

Protesters intend to reinstate roadblocks before the second round of the by-election. Although all 73 polling stations of the constituency were operational, several opened late due to obstructions to their entrances. In Acoua, locked doors and damaged locks necessitated police assistance, while three polling stations in Koungou were blocked by glue and soldered scrap metal.

== 2017 election result ==
First round results by commune

Second round results by commune

Candidate	Party	First round		Second round	
Candidate	Party	Votes	%	Votes	%
Ramlati Ali	Miscellaneous left	2,396	16.84	7,992	50.17
Elad Chakrina	The Republicans	2,384	16.76	7,938	49.83
Bacar Ali Boto	Miscellaneous left	2,223	15.62		
Daniel Zaïdani	Movement for the Development of Mayotte	1,906	13.40		
Youssouf Chihabouddine	Miscellaneous left	944	6.63		
Yahaya Moutuidine	Independent	803	5.64		
Kamel Messaoudi	Independent	723	5.08		
Bacar Haladi	Radical Party of the Left	651	4.58		
Saïd Ahamadi	Miscellaneous left	573	4.03		
Soihibou Ali-Mansoib	National Front	438	3.08		
Boinali Saïd	Miscellaneous left	371	2.61		
Christine Raharijaona	La France Insoumise	282	1.98		
Boina Dinouraini	Independent	264	1.86		
Saïd Ahamadi Salim	Independent	174	1.22		
Catherine Bihannic	Popular Republican Union	96	0.67		
Total		14,228	100.00	15,930	100.00
Valid votes		14,228	88.55	15,930	92.21
Invalid votes		1,197	7.45	783	4.53
Blank votes		642	4.00	563	3.26
Total votes		16,067	100.00	17,276	100.00
Registered voters/turnout		37,997	42.28	37,956	45.52
Source: Ministry of the Interior, political parties

== 2018 by-election result ==
Candidate	Party	First round		Second round	
Candidate	Party	Votes	%	Votes	%
Ramlati Ali	Miscellaneous left	3,875	36.15	8,246	54.77
Elad Chakrina	The Republicans	3,493	32.59	6,810	45.23
Bacar Ali Boto	Miscellaneous left	1,338	12.48		
Daniel Zaïdani	Movement for the Development of Mayotte	1,305	12.17		
Abdullah Mikidadi	La France Insoumise	280	2.61		
Alexandre Alçuyet	Popular Republican Union	189	1.76		
Bacar Mouta	Miscellaneous left	178	1.66		
Boina Dinouraini	Independent	61	0.57		
Total		10,719	100.00	15,056	100.00
Valid votes		10,719	90.52	15,056	93.89
Invalid votes		662	5.59	598	3.73
Blank votes		460	3.88	381	2.38
Total votes		11,841	100.00	16,035	100.00
Registered voters/turnout		38,968	30.39	38,768	41.36
Source: qPréfecture de Mayotte, Ministère de l'Intérieur, Préfecture de Mayotte, Ministère de l'Intérieur
