= Ibrahim Aboubacar =

French politician (born 1965)

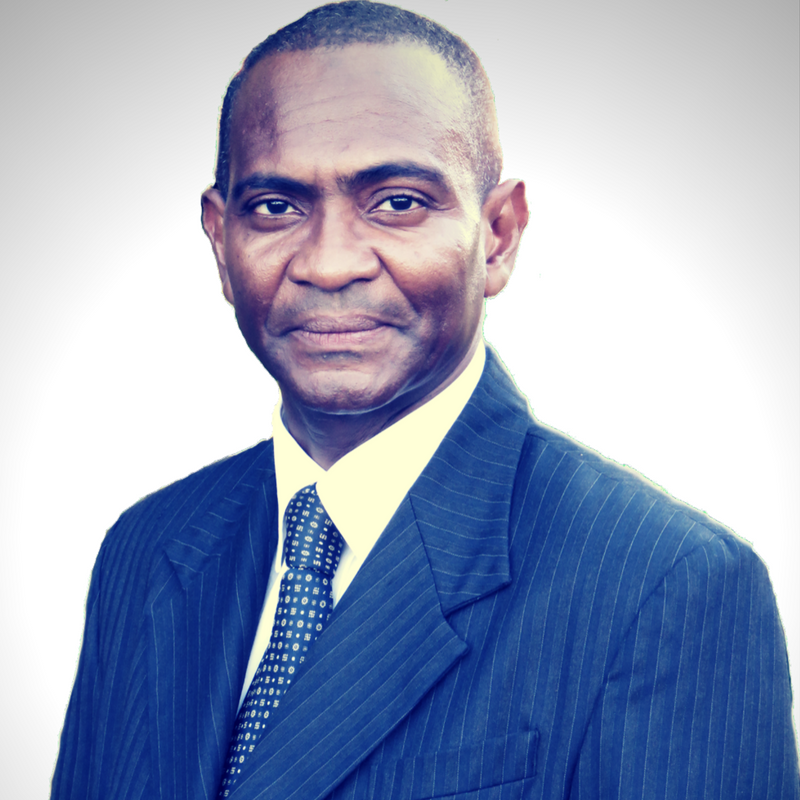
Ibrahim Aboubacar in 2017

Ibrahim Aboubacar (born 1 February 1965) is a French politician who was the French National Assembly deputy for Mayotte's 2nd constituency from 2012 to 2017.

== Biography ==
Aboubacar was born on 1 February 1965 in Fomboni on the island of Mohéli in Comoros. He and his family lived in Moroni until the Comoros gained independence in 1975, when they moved to Sada, Mayotte.

His family sent him to Réunion for secondary schooling, then he went to Paris to study engineering at l'École spéciale des travaux publics (ESTP) with the goal of returning to help improve Mayotte.

Aboubacar returned to Mayotte in 1990 where he worked in an urban planning agency for five years. During this time, he was involved in trade union activism and eventually became the spokesperson for the Mayotte Workers' Union before entering politics during the 1992 municipal elections.

Elected successively to the position of economic and social adviser of Mayotte from 1999 to 2004, and city councillor in the commune of Sada from 2008 to 2012, Aboubacar was elected as the 1st vice-president of the Departmental Council of Mayotte in 2012. He left the role soon after, when he was elected, as a member of the Socialist Party, to the post of deputy of Mayotte's second constituency in the same year. After one term he was eliminated in the first round of the 2017 French legislative election, finishing in third place with 11.37% of votes. His constituency was won in the second round by former deputy, Republican candidate Mansour Kamardine.

== Political views ==
Aboubacar's activity in politics is particularly concerned with the social and economic development of Mayotte, as he believes that the process of departmentalisation in Mayotte has not yet been completed.

In contrast to the majority of his party, Aboubacar argues for a restriction on obtaining French nationality for children born in Mayotte to illegal immigrants, as a means of "combatting smuggling networks, which are hiding all sorts of trafficking".

Aboubacar also calls for the Departmental Council of Mayotte to change the status of Port de Longoni in Longoni, Mayotte, to a major port of France.
