= Results of the 2024 French legislative election in Mayotte =

Following the first round of the 2024 French legislative election on 30 June 2024, runoff elections in each constituency where no candidate received a vote share greater than 50 percent were scheduled for 7 July. Candidates permitted to stand in the runoff elections needed to either come in first or second place in the first round or achieve more than 12.5 percent of the votes of the entire electorate (as opposed to 12.5 percent of the vote share due to low turnout).

== Mayotte ==
=== 1st constituency ===
Candidate	Party or alliance		Votes	%
Estelle Youssouffa	Miscellaneous right	Union of Democrats and Independents	13,640	79.48
Kambi Said Said	Miscellaneous right	Independent	2,513	14.64
Mikhaël Saify	Far-left	Lutte Ouvrière	684	3.99
Aurélia Maillard	Reconquête		325	1.89
Total			17,162	100.00
Valid votes			17,162	94.70
Invalid votes			543	3.00
Blank votes			417	2.30
Total votes			18,122	100.00
Registered voters/turnout			45,660	39.69

=== 2nd constituency ===
Candidate	Party or alliance		First round		Second round	
Candidate	Party or alliance		Votes	%	Votes	%
Anchya Bamana	National Rally		7,933	35.42	11,153	46.23
Mansour Kamardine	The Republicans		6,226	27.80	12,974	53.77
Soula Saïd-Souffou	Miscellaneous centre	Independent	3,560	15.90		
Madi-Boinamani Madi Mari	Ensemble	Miscellaneous centre	3,470	15.49		
Kira Bacar Adacolo	New Popular Front	Miscellaneous left	552	2.46		
Daniel Martial Henry	Miscellaneous right	Independent	369	1.65		
Aurélia Maillard	Reconquête		164	0.73		
Ahumad Salime	Independent		122	0.54		
Total			22,396	100.00	24,127	100.00
Valid votes			22,396	92.83	24,127	92.55
Invalid votes			1,019	4.22	1,154	4.43
Blank votes			711	2.95	788	3.02
Total votes			24,126	100.00	26,069	100.00
Registered voters/turnout			52,449	46.00	52,473	49.68
