= Mayotte's 2nd constituency =

Constituency of the French Fifth Republic

2nd constituency of Mayotte
- inline Constituency of the National Assembly of France

- constituency within Mayotte

- Location of Mayotte
- Deputy: Anchya Bamana; RN
- Department: Mayotte
- Cantons: Bandrélé, Bouéni, Chiconi, Chirongui, Dembéni, Kani-Kéli, Mamoudzou-3, M'tsangamouji, Ouangani, Sada et Tsingoni.
- Registered voters: 52,473

The 2nd constituency of Mayotte is a French legislative constituency on the island of Mayotte.

== Deputies ==
Election	Member	Party
2012	Ibrahim Aboubacar	PS
2017	Mansour Kamardine	LR
2022	Mansour Kamardine	LR
2024	Anchya Bamana	RN

== Election results ==
=== 2024 ===
Candidate	Party	Alliance	First round		Second round	
Candidate	Party	Alliance	Votes	%	Votes	%
Anchya Bamana	RN		7,933	35.42	12,974	53.77
Mansour Kamardine	LR		6,226	27.80	11,153	46.23
Soula Saïd-Souffou	MDM		3,560	15.90		
Madi-Boinamani Madi Mari	DVC	Ensemble	3,470	15.49		
Kira Bacar Adacolo	DVG	NFP	552	2.46		
Daniel Martial Henry	DVD		369	1.65		
Manon Moreno	REC		164	0.73		
Ahumad Salime	DIV		122	0.54		
Valid votes			22,396	100.00	24,127	100.00
Blank votes			711	2.95	788	3.02
Null votes			1,019	4.22	1,154	4.43
Turnout			24,126	46.00	26,069	49.68
Abstentions			28,323	54.00	26,404	50.32
Registered voters			52,449		52,473	
Result			RN GAIN FROM LR			

=== 2022 ===
Legislative Election 2022: Mayotte's 2nd constituency
Party	Candidate	Votes	%	±%
LR (UDC)	Mansour Kamardine	6,959	32.35	-4.45
DVC	Issa Issa Abdou	4,219	19.61	N/A
Agir (Ensemble)	Madi-Boinamani Madi Mari	4,098	19.05	+7.05
DVC	Soula Saïd-Souffou	3,011	14.00	N/A
DVG (NUPÉS)	Ali Djaroudi	1,062	4.94	−8.57
DVC	Mouhamadi Mchami	624	2.90	N/A
RN	Saidali Hamissi	567	2.64	+1.55
Others	N/A	974	4.53	−
Turnout		21,514	46.99	+0.89
2nd round result
LR (UDC)	Mansour Kamardine	14,250	59.24	-5.37
DVC	Issa Issa Abdou	9,806	40.76	N/A
Turnout		24,056	52.88	+3.33
LR hold				

=== 2017 ===
Candidate	Label	First round		Second round	
Candidate	Label	Votes	%	Votes	%
Mansour Kamardine	LR	6,876	36.80	12,901	64.61
Ibrahim Boinahery	MoDem	2,243	12.00	7,066	35.39
Ibrahim Aboubacar	PS	2,124	11.37		
Ahmed Attoumani Douchina	UDI	1,813	9.70		
Mouhamed Abdou	DIV	876	4.69		
Armamie Abdoul Wassion	DVD	740	3.96		
Mikidadi Ndzakou	DIV	732	3.92		
Mouhamadi Mchami	DIV	591	3.16		
Kamaldine Attoumani	DIV	582	3.11		
Jacques Henry	DIV	541	2.90		
Adrien Theilleux	FI	399	2.14		
Kira Adacolo	PRG	339	1.81		
Saïd Thestina	DVD	230	1.23		
Anli Madi Ngazi	DIV	210	1.12		
Madi Anli	FN	204	1.09		
Siaka Mahamoudou	DVG	123	0.66		
Farid Boutekezez	DIV	63	0.34		
Votes		18,686	100.00	19,967	100.00
Valid votes		18,686	90.47	19,967	89.85
Blank votes		786	3.81	723	3.25
Null votes		1,182	5.72	1,532	6.89
Turnout		20,654	46.10	22,222	49.55
Abstentions		24,151	53.90	22,623	50.45
Registered voters		44,805		44,845	
Source: Ministry of the Interior

=== 2012 ===
2012 legislative election in Mayotte's 2nd constituency
Candidate	Party	First round		Second round	
Candidate	Party	Votes	%	Votes	%
Mansour Kamardine	UMP	7,416	34.85%	10,532	45.05%
Ibrahim Aboubacar	PS	5,149	24.19%	12,846	54.95%
Ali Hakime Ali Said	DVG	2,364	11.11%		
Sarah Mouhoussoune	DVG	1,706	8.02%		
Papa Ahmed Combo	MDM	1,401	6.58%		
Jacques-Martial Henry	NC	905	4.25%		
Aynoudine Madi	MPM	759	3.57%		
Attoumani Abdallah	SE	547	2.57%		
Kamaldine Attoumani	EELV	451	2.12%		
Toumbou Maurice dit Mandela	DVD	403	1.89%		
Omar Abdallah	FN	181	0.85%		
Abdouldajbar Salim	DVD	0	0.00%		
Valid votes		21,282	94.80%	23,378	95.10%
Spoilt and null votes		1,167	5.20%	1,205	4.90%
Votes cast / turnout		22,449	53.46%	24,583	58.53%
Abstentions		19,541	46.54%	17,420	41.47%
Registered voters		41,990		42,003	

== Sources and references ==
- French Interior Ministry results website: "Résultats électoraux officiels en France" (in French).
