= Zakia Madi =

Activist from Mayotte

Zakia Madi (1944–1969) was a Mahoran activist and a member of the Chatouilleuses and who was killed by the Comorian army during a protest in 1969. Both the market and a school in Mayotte have been renamed in her honour.

== Biography ==
Born in Ouangani in 1944, Madi was one of the leaders of the Chatouilleuses, a Mahoran women's movement who supported the French claim to Mayotte. Other women in the movement included Zéna M'Déré and Bweni M'Titi, as well as Zaïna Méresse and Echati Maoulida.

Madi was killed in Mamoudzou on 13 October 1969 during clashes with the Comorian guard in Mamoudzou. Whilst around twenty people were injured, hers was the only fatality. Due to her death reconciliation between the Mahoré People's Movement and Said Mohamed Cheikh's Parti Vert proved impossible.

== Commemoration ==
The Mahoran writer Alain-Kamal Martial wrote a play about her, entitled Zakia Madi: la chatouilleuse, which was published in 2004. The covered market of Mamoudzou was named after Madi in 2014. Collège Zakia Madi in Mayotte is also named after her.
