= Outline of Mayotte =

Overview of and topical guide to Mayotte

The flag of Mayotte

The coat of arms of Mayotte

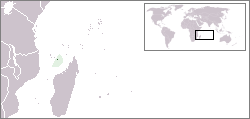
The location of Mayotte

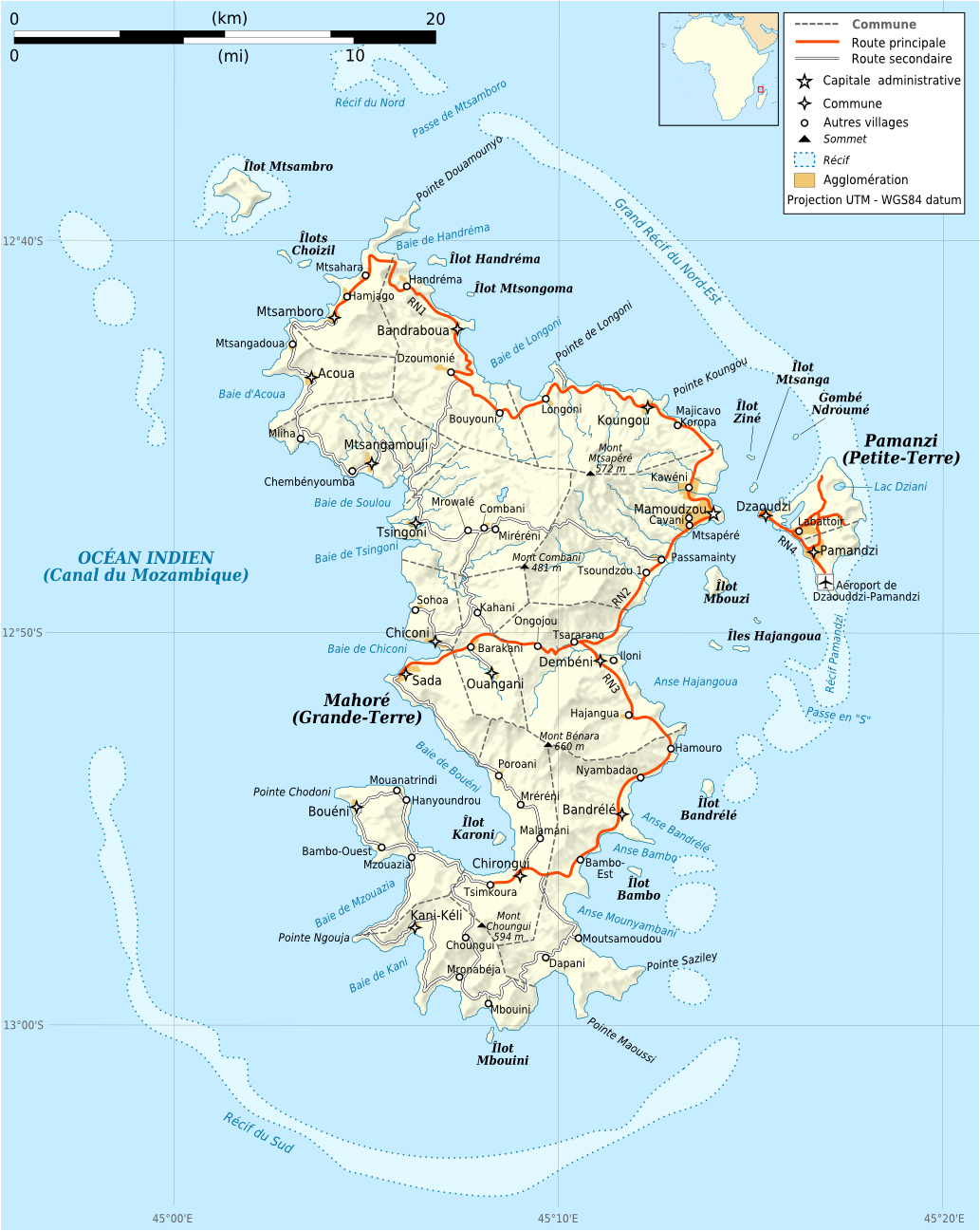
An enlargeable relief map of the French Departmental Collectivity of Mayotte

The following outline is provided as an overview of and topical guide to Mayotte

Mayotte – overseas department of France located in the Comoros Archipelago in the Indian Ocean. The department comprises the main island of Grande-Terre (or Mahoré), a smaller island, Petite-Terre (or Pamanzi), and several islets at the northern end of the Mozambique Channel, between northern Madagascar and northern Mozambique. The territory is geographically part of the Comoro Islands, but has been politically separate since the 1970s. The territory is also known as Mahoré, the native name of its main island, especially by advocates of its inclusion in the Union of Comoros.

== General reference ==
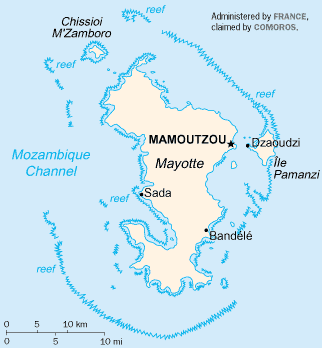
An enlargeable basic map of Mayotte

- Pronunciation:
- Common English country name: Mayotte
- Official English country name: Department of Mayotte
- Common endonym(s):
- Official endonym(s):
- Adjectival(s): Mahoran
- Demonym(s): Mahoran(s)
- ISO country codes: YT, MYT, 175
- ISO region codes: See ISO 3166-2:YT
- Internet country code top-level domain: .yt

== Geography of Mayotte ==
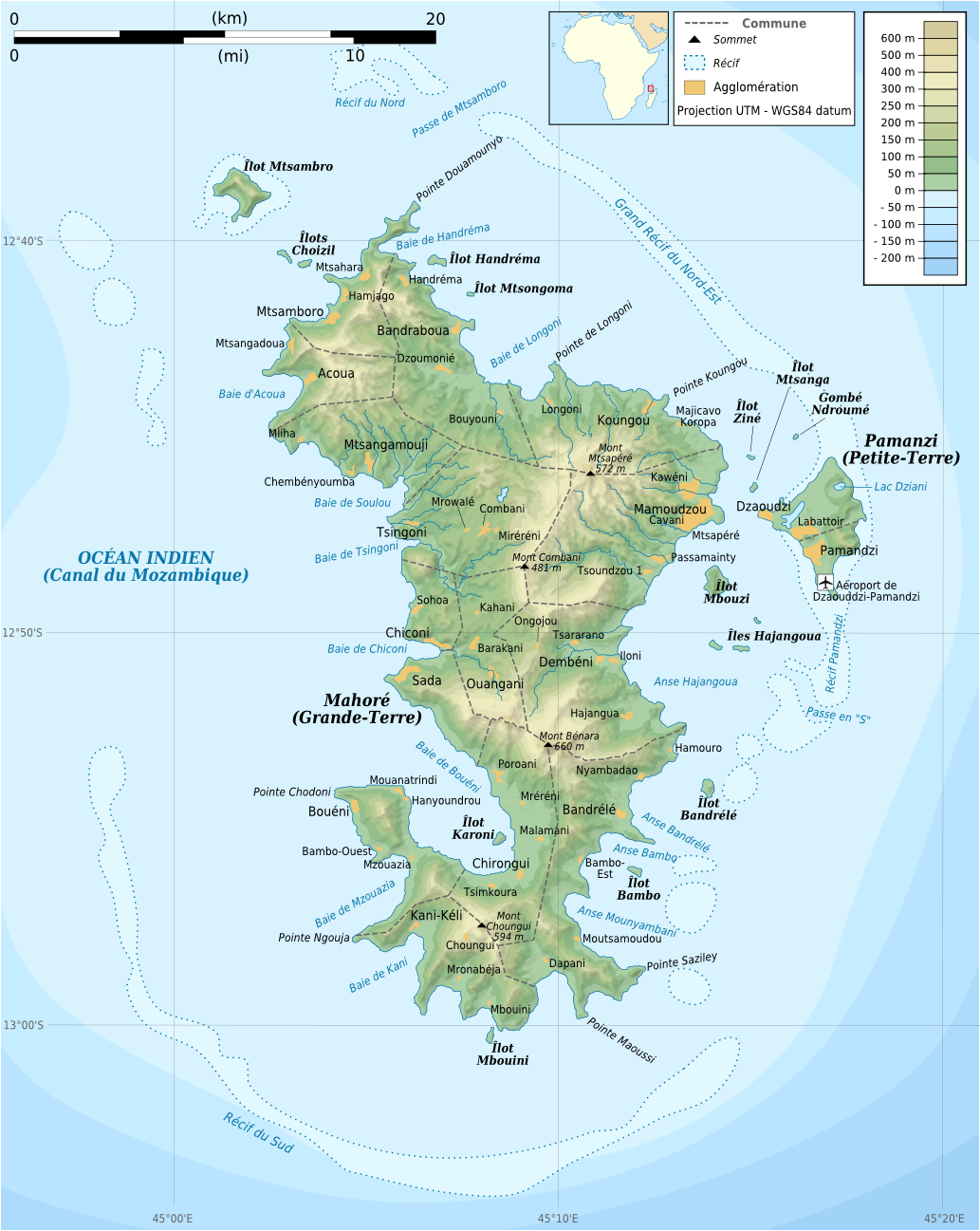
An enlargeable topographic map of Mayotte

Geography of Mayotte

- Mayotte is: an island, and a French overseas department
- Location:
  - Eastern Hemisphere and Southern Hemisphere
  - Africa (off its east coast, north and west of Madagascar)
    - East Africa
    - Southern Africa
  - Indian Ocean
  - Time zone: East Africa Time (UTC+03)
  - Extreme points of Mayotte
    - High: Benara 660 m (2,165 ft)
    - Low: Mozambique Channel 0 m
  - Land boundaries: none
  - Coastline: Indian Ocean 185.2 km
- Population of Mayotte: 186,452 (July 31, 2007) - —th most populous country
- Area of Mayotte: 374 km^{2}
- Atlas of Mayotte

=== Environment of Mayotte ===
- Climate of Mayotte
- Wildlife of Mayotte
  - Fauna of Mayotte
    - Mammals of Mayotte

==== Natural geographic features of Mayotte ====
- Glaciers of Mayotte: none
- Islands of Mayotte
- World Heritage Sites in Mayotte: None

=== Regions of Mayotte ===
Regions of Mayotte

==== Ecoregions of Mayotte ====
List of ecoregions in Mayotte

==== Administrative divisions of Mayotte ====
None

===== Municipalities of Mayotte =====
- Capital of Mayotte: Mamoudzou
- Cities of Mayotte

=== Demography of Mayotte ===
Demographics of Mayotte

== Government and politics of Mayotte ==
Politics of Mayotte

- Form of government:
- Capital of Mayotte: Mamoudzou
- Elections in Mayotte
- Political parties in Mayotte

=== Branches of the government of Mayotte ===
Government of Mayotte

==== Executive branch of the government of Mayotte ====
- Head of state: President of Mayotte, Ben Issa Ousseni
- Head of government: Prime Minister of Mayotte

==== Legislative branch of the government of Mayotte ====
- Parliament of Mayotte (bicameral)
  - Upper house: Senate of Mayotte
  - Lower house: House of Commons of Mayotte

==== Judicial branch of the government of Mayotte ====
Court system of Mayotte

=== Foreign relations of Mayotte ===
Foreign relations of Mayotte

- Diplomatic missions of Mayotte

==== International organization membership ====
The Departmental Collectivity of Mayotte is a member of:

- Indian Ocean Commission (InOC)
- Universal Postal Union (UPU)
- World Federation of Trade Unions (WFTU)

=== Law and order in Mayotte ===
Law of Mayotte

- Human rights in Mayotte
  - LGBT rights in Mayotte

=== Military of Mayotte ===
Military of Mayotte

- Command
  - Commander-in-chief:
- Forces

=== Local government in Mayotte ===
Local government in Mayotte

== History of Mayotte ==
History of Mayotte

- Current events of Mayotte

== Culture of Mayotte ==
Culture of Mayotte

- Languages of Mayotte
- National symbols of Mayotte
  - Coat of arms of Mayotte
  - Flag of Mayotte
- Religion in Mayotte
  - Islam in Mayotte
  - Sikhism in Mayotte
- World Heritage Sites in Mayotte: None

=== Art in Mayotte ===
- Music of Mayotte

=== Sports in Mayotte ===
Sports in Mayotte

- Football in Mayotte

== Economy and infrastructure of Mayotte ==
Economy of Mayotte

- Economic rank, by nominal GDP (2007):
- Communications in Mayotte
  - Internet in Mayotte
- Companies of Mayotte
- Currency of Mayotte: Euro (see also: Euro topics)
  - ISO 4217: EUR
- Transport in Mayotte
  - Airports in Mayotte
  - Rail transport in Mayotte

== Education in Mayotte ==
Education in Mayotte

== See also ==
Mayotte

- List of international rankings
- List of Mayotte-related topics
- Outline of Africa
- Outline of France
- Outline of geography
