= Zéna M'Déré =

French politician

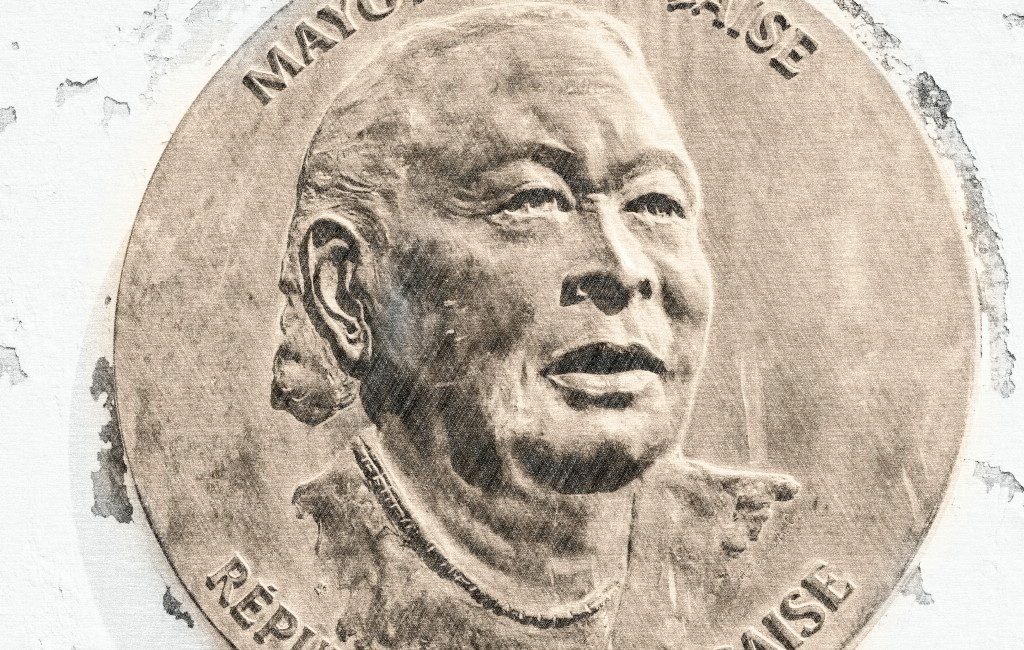
Zéna-M’Déré

Zéna M'Déré (c. 1917 to 1922 – October 27, 1999) was a Mayotte woman best known as the leader of the Chatouilleuses, a movement of women who fought to maintain Mayotte's status as a French overseas department rather than joining Comoros in declaring independence, notably through the use of tickle torture on political leaders.

== Biography ==
Zéna M'Déré was born sometime between 1917 and 1922 in Pamandzi, Mayotte.

She moved to Antsiranana, Madagascar, and ran a Koranic school there. But she was expelled from the country by Malagasy President Philibert Tsiranana in 1966 and returned to her native island, just as the divide between Mayotte and the rest of the Comoros archipelago was reaching a breaking point. The island chain's president had transferred the capital from Mayotte to his home island of Grande Comore in 1961, which reduced Mayotte residents' political power and was taken as an affront. The Mahorans also saw themselves as more educated, wealthy, Westernized, and secular than the rest of the Comoros. The French government's rhetoric contributed to the divisions between the two camps, as France hoped to retain a foothold in the area.

Back at home, M'Déré became a major figure in the Mahoran women's movement. In 1966, she became the leader of Mayotte's women's revolt, an insurrectionary movement in favor of the island's break with the Comorian authorities, which would allow Mayotte to remain part of the French Republic. These activists, sometimes referred to as the Chatouilleuses, notably employed tickle torture to compel Comorian officials to comply with their demands. The mobs of tickling women would attack pro-independence leaders, such as Saïd Mohamed Cheikh, while they were out walking and even physically force them onto planes that would take them off the island. Other tactics of the Chatouilleuses included tossing stones onto the tin roofs of their political opponents' houses to keep them up at night.

The movement was far from playful, however, and one of M'Déré's comrades, Zakia Madi, was shot and killed during a protest. M'Déré herself was arrested during a protest in February 1967 but was given a suspended sentence. The movement she led was crucial in the foundation of what became one of Mayotte's major political parties, the Mahoré People's Movement.

After the split between Mayotte and Comoros was secured and the new party was established, M'Déré largely withdrew from politics. However, she continued to be viewed as an important national figure.

M'Déré was married three times, the first time at age 15, then again at age 22 and age 26. She was single again by the time she returned to Mayotte in the 1960s, and she had no children.

== Recognition ==
M'Déré was named a knight of the French Legion of Honour on April 25, 1991. She was promoted to officer on July 14, 1999, only a few months before her death on October 27, 1999.

In 2012, she appeared on a 10-euro coin minted by the Monnaie de Paris, representing Mayotte as part of a special coin collection. A school in Pamandzi is also named in her honor.

== See also ==
- Zaïna Méresse
