= Politics of Mayotte =

The politics of Mayotte takes place in a framework of a French overseas region and department, which until 2011 was an overseas collectivity.

Local politics takes place in a parliamentary representative democratic setting, whereby the President of the General Council is the head of government, of a multi-party system. Executive power is exercised by the government.

The status of Mayotte changed in 2001 towards one very close to the status of the départements of mainland France, with the particular designation of collectivité départementale, although the island is still claimed by the Comoros. This change was approved by 73% in a referendum on Mayotte. After the constitutional reform of 2003 it became a collectivité d'outre-mer while keeping the title collectivité départementale de Mayotte.

== 2009 referendum and effects ==
Mayotte became an overseas department of France (département d'outre-mer, DOM) on 31 March 2011 following the result of the March 2009 Mahoran status referendum, which was approved by around 95% of voters, with 61% of those eligible voting.

In order to effectuate this referendum, several laws has to be updated to conform with French law. These included a ban on polygamy before it became a department, increases to Women's rights such as equal inheritance rights, and the minimum age to legally marry was raised from 15 to 18 years old. The traditional Mayotte local court system, which combined Quranic principles of Islam with African and Malagasy customs, was phased out in favor of the French legal system. Islamic law was abolished and replaced by uniform French civil code.

== Executive branch ==
The head of state is the President of France as represented by prefect Thierry Suquet.

The head of government is President of the General Council. Soibahadine Ibrahim Ramadani was President from 2 April 2015 to 1 July 2021. The current president is Ben Issa Ousseni, since 1 July 2021. He is a member of The Republicans.

== Legislative branch ==
The General Council (Conseil Général) has 19 members, elected for a three-year term in single seat constituencies.

Mayotte also sends two deputies to the French National Assembly and two senators to the French Senate. The deputies represent Mayotte's 1st constituency and Mayotte's 2nd constituency.

== Political parties and elections ==
In recent national elections, Mayotte has been a stronghold for the right-wing populist National Rally party, and gave its presidential candidate Marine Le Pen her highest vote percentage in the 2022 French presidential election first round. While the party tries to restrict Islamic practice in continental France, the message in Mayotte is against immigration, not Islam. This explains its success in this Muslim-majority territory.

== See also ==
- Politics of France
