= Abdoulatifou Aly =

French politician (1960–2020)

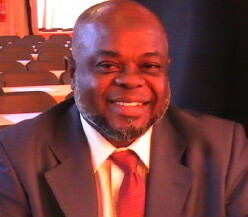

Member of the National Assembly for Mayotte's 1st constituency
- In office 2007–2012
- Preceded by: Mansour Kamardine
- Succeeded by: Boinali Saïd

Personal details
- Born: 12 April 1960 Diego-Suarez, Madagascar
- Died: 26 June 2020 (aged 60) Mamoudzou, Mayotte
- Party: MoDem
- Education: University of Strasbourg
- Profession: Jurist

Abdoulatifou Aly (12 April 1960 – 26 June 2020) was a Malagascar-born French Mahoran politician, a long-term representative of the island of Mayotte at the National Assembly of France, and a member of the executive bureau of the Democratic Movement.

== Juridical career ==
Abdoulatifou Aly received both his primary and middle school education in Mayotte, before graduating high school in Lycée Leconte-de-Lisle in Saint-Denis-de-la-Réunion. He then continued to study the law at the Robert Schumann University in Strasbourg, where he specialised in the laws of territorial collectivities.

He was then made the territorial attaché of Moselle, in charge of social actions. In 1988, he returned to Mayotte, where he launched a political attack before becoming the chief officer of finance, then the assistant general secretary in 1990 and general secretary in 1992. He was a lawyer at the Bar of Mamoudzou.

On 19 September 2011, he was convicted on appeal of retaining the damages (20,000 euros in one case, 50,000 in another) awarded to his clients, who were victims of child rape. He was banned by the court for two years.

== Political career ==
While he was affiliated with the Mahoré People's Movement (French: Mouvement populaire mahorais), he was assistant mayor of Pamandzi from 1989 to 1995. He then became parliamentary assistant and substitute to Senator Marcel Henry, a job that he had until 2004.

During that time, he also became the president of the Georges Nahouda club, a club of reflection on departmentalisation. He adhered to the Mahoré People's Movement under which he got re-elected as the assistant mayor of Pamandzi in 2001. Since then, he has joined the Force of Alteration (French: la Force de l’Alternance) a dissidence of MDM.

As a member of this movement, he qualified for the second round of the French legislative elections of 2007, then was elected on 17 June with the support of and under the label of the Democratic Movement, who he joined twice – during the first time, in fact, the Democratic Movement supported Daroussi Zainadini, also of MDM. He beat the other candidate, Masour Kamardine of the Union for a Popular Movement (French: Union pour un mouvement populaire, UPM) with 56.29% of the votes.

He pleaded throughout his campaign for "The republican equality" and declared "It is a must that the same rights come to Mayotte as everywhere else in the Republic."

Like the three others elected from the Democratic Movement, he did not vote on the trust of the François Fillon government and he abstained. He joined the office of the Union for French Democracy, (French: Union pour la Démocratie Française, UDF) a constituent of the Democratic Movement, during the congress of the party on 30 November 2007 in Villepinte.

In July 2010, Abdoulatifou Aly expressed that he was in favour of a law scheme about burqas.

He suffered a sudden great loss during the legislative elections on 10 June 2012, as he did not gain more than 0.82% of the poll with 127 votes, a new low for an outgoing MP. On 24 May 2013 the constitutional council rejected his campaign accounts and he was declared ineligible for one year.
