= Ramlati Ali =

French politician (born 1961)

Member of the National Assembly for Mayotte's 1st constituency
- In office 26 March 2018 – 22 June 2022
- Preceded by: Boinali Saïd
- Succeeded by: Estelle Youssouffa

Personal details
- Born: 28 May 1961 (age 65) Pamandzi, France
- Party: Independent; Socialist Party
- Profession: Physician

Ramlati Ali (born 28 May 1961) is a French politician who served as Member of Parliament for Mayotte's 1st constituency from 2018 to 2022. She was elected as a Socialist candidate in a 2018 by-election but sits in the En Marche group in the National Assembly.

== Career ==
She became the first female doctor in Mayotte in 1996. She later became head of the medical, psychiatric, and rehabilitation department at Mayotte's hospital.

== Local Politics ==
Ali ran for mayor of Pamandzi in 2008, leading an independent list and winning 35.02% of the vote in the second round. She was elected mayor by the municipal council. She ran for the French National Assembly in 2012, opposing the legalization of same-sex marriage in Mayotte, but was eliminated in the first round.

After being declared ineligible due to campaign irregularities, she could not run for re-election as mayor in 2014. She became president of the Société immobilière de Mayotte in June 2014.

== National Politics ==
In the 2017 legislative elections, Ali ran for the first constituency of Mayotte as a Socialist candidate. She was initially declared defeated but was later declared the winner after a recount. She became the first female deputy from Mayotte. Controversy arose when she appeared at the National Assembly wearing a headscarf, which she explained as a traditional Mahoran shawl with no religious connotation.

Ali joined the La République en Marche group and voted for the government of Prime Minister Édouard Philippe. She was a member of the Cultural Affairs and Education Committee and was elected secretary of the National Assembly.

In January 2018, her election was annulled by the Constitutional Council due to fraudulent proxy votes. She was re-elected in a partial election in March 2018.

== Legal Issues ==
In February 2018, Ali was placed in custody for complicity in electoral fraud. She was accused of involvement in the creation and use of false proxy votes during the 2017 legislative elections. She denied the charges and was later acquitted, as the court did not establish her personal involvement. Several individuals, including a gendarme and a doctor, were convicted.

== Key Positions ==
- Mayor of Pamandzi (2008-2014)
- President of the Société immobilière de Mayotte (Mayotte Real Estate Company - since 2014)
- Deputy for Mayotte's first constituency (2017-2018, 2018-2022)
- Secretary of the National Assembly (2017-2018)
