= Chatouilleuses =

Mahorese women's political activist group

The Chatouilleuses (English: 'Ticklers'), nicknamed the sorodas wa Maore (English:Soldiers of Mayotte) were a group of Mahoran women who used tickle torture on Comorian political leaders in the 1960s and 1970s, in order to reduce the influence of the other islands in the Comorian archipelago on Mayotte, and to keep Mayotte within the French Republic.

== Actions ==
The Chatouilleuses took action where the Mouvement populaire mahorais could not. Under the leadership of Zéna M’Déré, hundreds of women organised into groups and targeted Comorian political leaders who were visiting Mayotte, subjecting them to attacks of tickling, thus forcing them to align with their political positions, or leave the island instead.

They were not content with just tickling them. When Dzaoudzi was still the capital of Mayotte, they would spend every night throwing stones onto the roofs of residences of those known as Serrez-la-main, that is, those in favour of independence.

== History ==
On 4 February 1967, Saïd Mohamed Cheikh forced the four elected leaders of the Chatouilleuses to resign, after roughly 60 ticklers attacked the Office de Radiodiffusion Télévision Française station in Mayotte. They were protesting against a condescending speech Cheikh had made towards them, and more generally, towards the Mahorais. Thirteen women were sentenced, some of them to prison terms.

On 13 October 1969, the Comorian Guard, established in 1968, opened fire and killed one of the Chatouilleuse, named Zadia Maki.

== Notable members ==
- Zéna M’Déré
- Zakia Madi
- Echati Maoulida
- Zaïna Méresse
- Boueni M'titi
- Coco Djoumoi
- Halima Laza Mze, known as Colonel Laza
- Mariame Mwatrouwa, known as Mouchoula
- Echat Sidi

== Legacy ==
The Association of Female Leaders in Public Life in Mayotte, established in 2012 set themselves the goal of continuing the Chatouilleuses' movement.
