= 1977 Mayotte by-election =

A by-election to the French National Assembly was held in Mayotte on 13 March 1977. The territory elected a single seat, taken by Younoussa Bamana of the Mahoré People's Movement, who was elected unopposed.

== Results ==
Candidate	Party	Votes	%
Younoussa Bamana	Mahoré People's Movement	14,868	100.00
Total		14,868	100.00
Valid votes		14,868	97.43
Invalid/blank votes		392	2.57
Total votes		15,260	100.00
Registered voters/turnout		18,148	84.09
Source: Sternberger et al.
