= 1978 French legislative election in Mayotte =

Elections to the French National Assembly were held in Mayotte on 12 March 1978. The territory elected a single seat, won by Younoussa Bamana of the Mahoré People's Movement.

== Results ==
Candidate	Party	Votes	%
Younoussa Bamana	Mahoré People's Movement	12,829	92.04
Maoulina		1,109	7.96
Total		13,938	100.00
Registered voters/turnout		18,814	–
Source: Sternberger et al.
