= Ben Issa Ousseni =

French politician

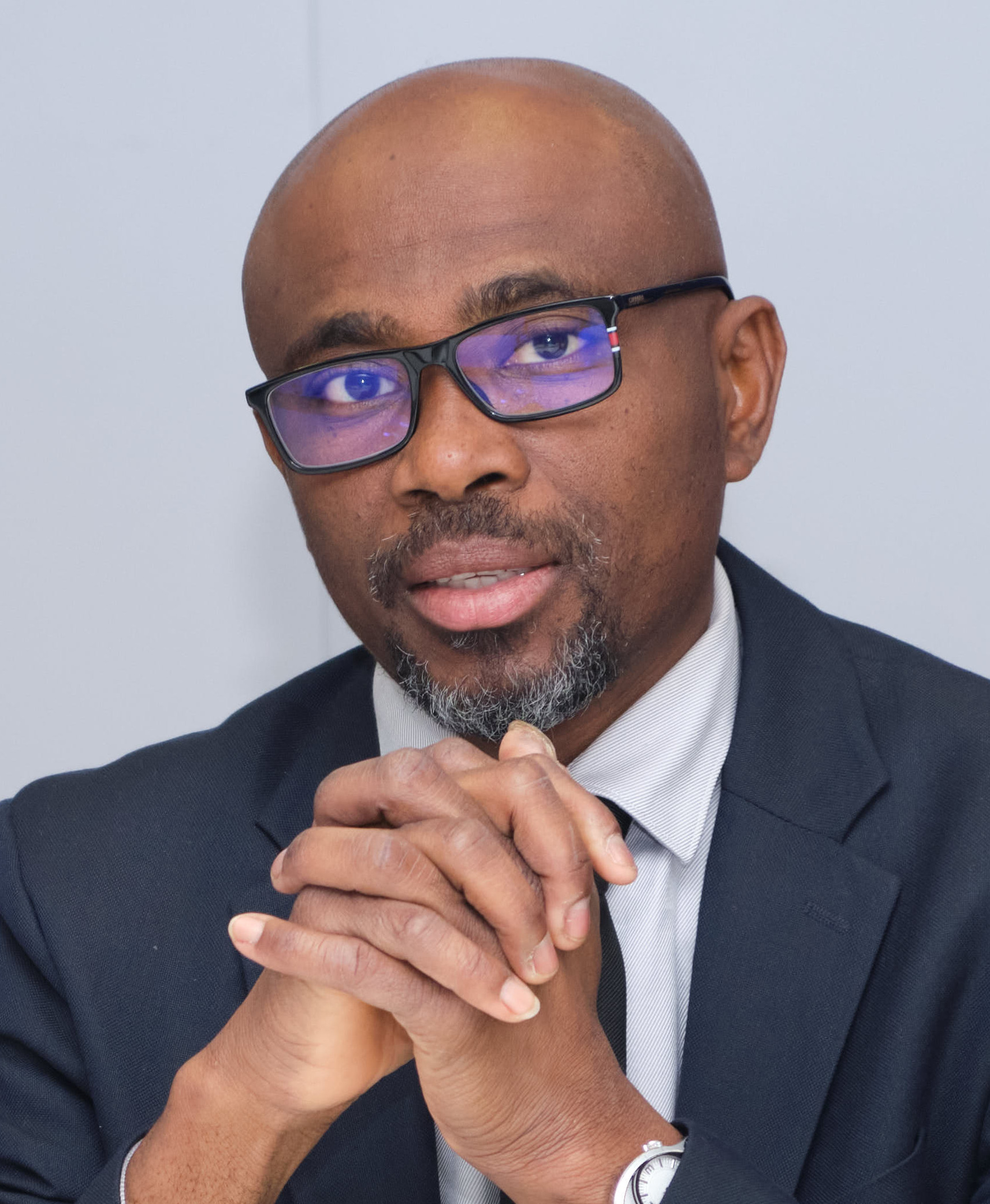

7th President of the Departmental Council of Mayotte
- Incumbent
- Assumed office 1 July 2021
- Preceded by: Soibahadine Ibrahim Ramadani

Member of the Departmental Council of Mayotte
- Incumbent
- Assumed office 2011
- Constituency: M'Tsangamouji (2011—2015); Tsingoni (2015—present)

Personal details
- Born: 11 July 1973 (age 52) Mamoudzou, Mayotte
- Political party: The Republicans

Ben Issa Ousseni (born 11 July 1973) is a French politician who has been the 7th President of the Departmental Council of Mayotte since 2021, and a member of the council since 2011. He is a member of The Republicans.

== Early life and education ==
Ben Issa Ousseni was born in Mamoudzou, Mayotte, on 11 July 1973. He graduated from a university technical institute after attending finance and accounting courses from 1995 to 1997.

== Career ==
Ousseni worked as an accountant for CEMEA de Picardie from 2001 to 2005. In the Departmental Council of Mayotte he was an administrative and financial officer.

In 2011, Ousseni was elected to the council representing M'Tsangamouji, and was elected to represent Tsingoni in 2015 and 2021. On 1 July 2021, he defeated Maynounati Ahamadi Moussa by a vote of 14 to 12 to become the 7th president of the council. He was chair of the Mayotte Development and Innovation Agency and is a member of The Republicans.

Ousseni requested Prime Minister François Bayrou to declare a state of emergency after Mayotte was hit by Cyclone Chido.

== Political positions ==
Ousseni supports increasing the percentage of land allotted to forests and preserved natural areas to 20%.

In 2024, Ousseni launched an infrastructure programme to prepare for the 2036 Island Games. This programme included the construction of an arena in Ouangani, a dojo and Olympic-sized pool in Koungou, and new gymnasiums, football stadium, and an athletics track. Interurban lines to connect Mamoudzou with the northern and southern parts of the island are planned.

Construction of a second prison to handle Congolese migrants is planned by Ousseni.

== Works cited ==
=== News ===
- "Ben Issa Ousseni garde le cap". Mayotte Hebdo. 5 July 2021. Archived from the original on 28 June 2025.
- Cann, Raphael (3 October 2024). "Transports, infrastructures, foncier : le président du département fait le point sur ses projets". France Info. Archived from the original on 28 June 2025.
- Jaëglé, Benoit (18 December 2024). "Ben Issa Ousseni en appelle au Premier ministre pour déclencher l'état d'urgence". Le Journal De Mayotte. Archived from the original on 28 June 2025.
- Minas, Bruno (1 July 2021). "Ben Issa Ousseni est élu président du Conseil Départemental de Mayotte". France Info. Archived from the original on 28 June 2025.

=== Web ===
- "Ben Issa Ousseni". Mayotte. Archived from the original on 28 June 2025.
