= Canton of Pamandzi =

Coordinates: 12.80°S 45.28°E

The canton of Pamandzi is an administrative division of Mayotte, an overseas department and region of France. Its borders were not modified at the French canton reorganisation which came into effect in March 2015. Its seat is in Pamandzi.

It consists of the following communes:

1. Pamandzi
