= Zaïna Méresse =

Mahorese political activist

- Born: June 18, 1935; Bandrélé Mayotte
- Died: April 11, 2014 (aged 78); Mamoudzou Mayotte
- Burial place: Pamandzi
- Citizenship: French
- Occupation: Politician
- Movement: Chatouilleuses
- Awards: Knight of • Legion of Honour Officer • Legion of Honour Knight of • Ordre national du Mérite Officer • Ordre national du Mérite

Zaïna Meresse, born Boinali on June 18, 1935, in Bandrele and died on April 11, 2014, in Mamoudzou, was a Mahorese activist and politician.

She was one of the leaders of the Mahorese Chatouilleuses who claimed Mayotte for France. She then sat on the general council of Mayotte.

== Biography ==
Zaïna Méresse, was born on June 18, 1935, in Bandrélé on the island of Grande-Terre, in Mayotte.

She got involved in the 1960s so that Mayotte would remain French during the independence of the Comoros. With them, other women, such as Coco Djoumoi and Boueni M'Titi, decided to carry out commando actions against the authorities, coming from Grande Comore, by resorting to an original means of action to push them back. They are then called the Chatouilleuses, of which Zaïna Meresse is "one of the historical combatants". Being married to a metropolitan, she spoke French, unlike the other activists, which enabled her to write letters to the authorities, and also to grant numerous interviews to relate her experience within the movement, contributing to publicize it.

She subsequently committed to the Departmental Council of Mayotte.

== Awards and nominations ==
- 1978 : Knight of Ordre national du Mérite
- 1994 : OfficerOrdre national du Mérite
- 2004 : Knight of Legion of Honour
- 2013 : Officer Legion of Honour
