= Canton of Dzaoudzi =

Coordinates: 12.79°S 45.27°E

The canton of Dzaoudzi is an administrative division of Mayotte, an overseas department and region of France. Its borders were not modified at the French canton reorganisation which came into effect in March 2015. Its seat is in Dzaoudzi.

It consists of the following communes:

1. Dzaoudzi
