= Majicavo Lamir =

Village in the commune of Koungou on Mayotte, France

Coordinates: 12°45′19″S 45°13′47″E

Majicavo Lamir is a village in the commune of Koungou on Mayotte.
