= 2004 Mahoran departmental election =

Parliamentary elections were held in Mayotte on 21 March and 28 March 2004. The Mahoran branch of the Union for a Popular Movement won the most seats despite receiving fewer votes than the Mahoré Departementalist Movement.

== Results ==
Party	Votes	%	Seats
Mahoré Departementalist Movement		23.3	6
Union for a Popular Movement		22.8	9
Socialist Party		10.2	0
Citizen and Republican Movement		8.9	2
Force of the Rally and the Alliance for Democracy		6.5	0
Mahoré People's Movement		1.2	1
Miscellaneous left			1
Total			19
Source: CIA
