= Majicavo Koropa =

Village on Mayotte in the Indian Ocean

Coordinates: 12°44′47″S 45°13′13″E

Majicavo Koropa is a village in the commune of Koungou on Mayotte.
