= Hamissi Assani =

Mayotte politician

Hamissi Assani is a Mahoran politician. He served as the President of the General Council of Mayotte from March 1991 to April 1991 as an independent.
