= Anchya Bamana =

French politician

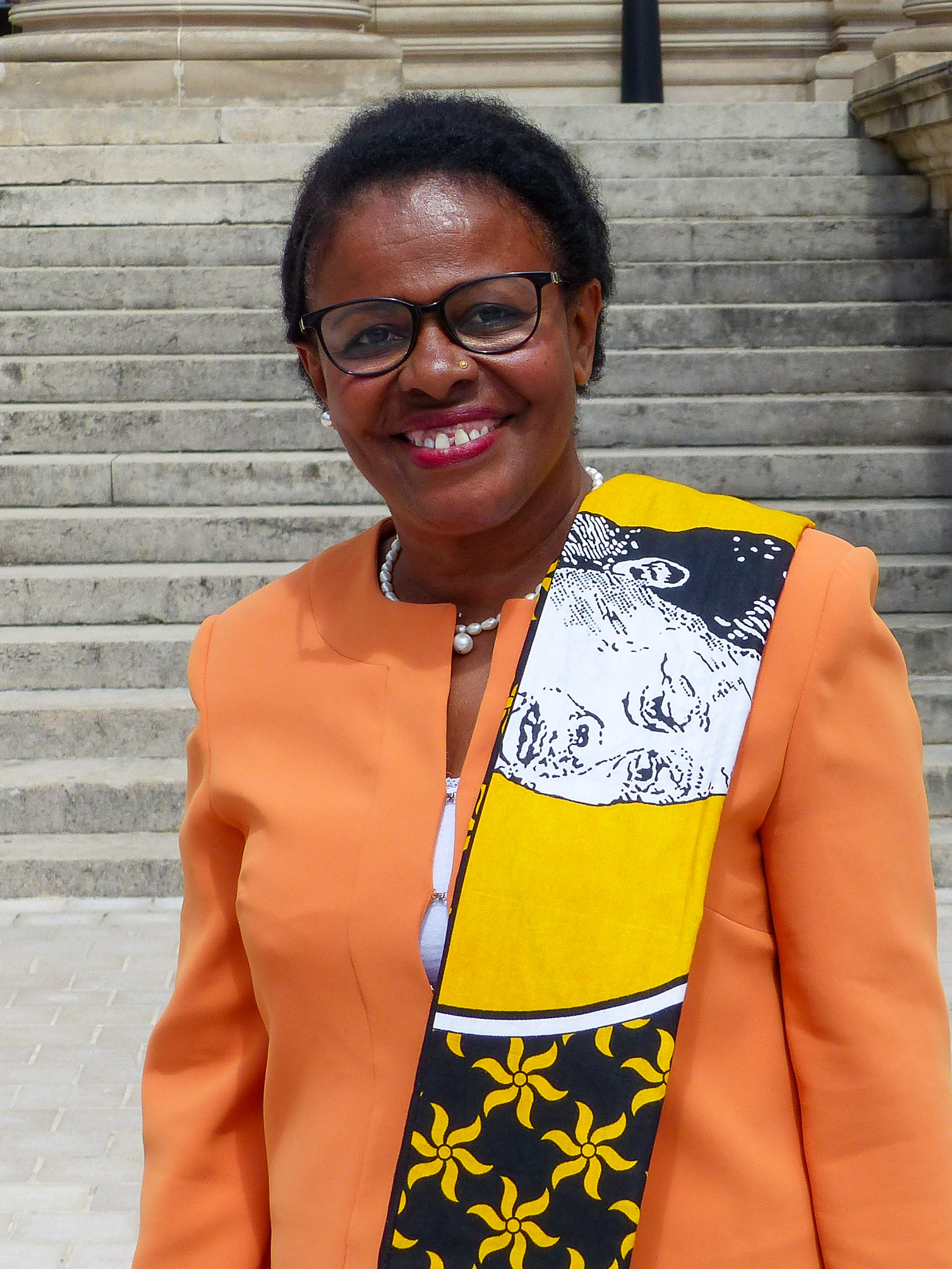

Member of the French National Assembly for Mayotte's 2nd constituency
- Incumbent
- Assumed office 18 July 2024
- Preceded by: Mansour Kamardine

Personal details
- Party: National Rally

Anchya Bamana (French pronunciation: [ɑ̃ʃja bamana]) is a French politician of the National Rally (RN). She was elected member of the National Assembly for Mayotte's 2nd constituency in 2024.

She and Joseph Rivière from Réunion's 3rd constituency are the first (Note: Jean Fontaine, MP from Réunion, switched from UDR to RN in 1984. He did not seek reelection.) RN MPs in overseas constituencies. Her major priority is the protection of Mayotte from illegal immigration, but also halting the French state from compulsorily purchasing land for rebuilding efforts and infrastructure in Mayotte, following natural disasters.

== Biography ==
Anchya Bamana is the daughter of the first president of the Mayotte Departmental Council, Younoussa Bamana. A nurse by training, she worked for the Mayotte Regional Health Agency (ARS) as head of primary care and regional coordination. She was elected municipal councilor of Sada, Mayotte on March 23, 2014, and also mayor of the municipality. She was not re-elected as mayor in 2020, but continues to sit on the municipal council of Sada, as well as on the community council of the Centre-Ouest community of municipalities.

On May 28, 2021, she was declared ineligible for 18 months by the Mayotte Administrative Court for late submission of her campaign accounts for the 2020 municipal elections. She has appealed.

She was elected representative for Mayotte's 2nd constituency on July 7, 2024, becoming the first female representative in the history of the RN in the overseas territories.
