= Ahmed Attoumani Douchina =

Mayotte politician (born 1955)

Ahmed Attoumani Douchina President of the Departmental Council of Mayotte
- Born: January 2, 1955 (age 71)
- Occupation: Politician
- Successor: Daniel Zaïdani
- Political party: Union for a Popular Movement
- Other political affiliations: Union of Democrats and Independents

Ahmed Attoumani Douchina (born January 2, 1955) is a Mahoran politician. Douchina served as the President of the Departmental Council of Mayotte between 20 March 2009 and 3 April 2011, when he was succeeded by Daniel Zaïdani. Zaudani narrowly defeated Douchina 10-9 (by just one vote) in the council's presidential election.

== Biography ==
A municipal councilor in Kani-Kéli from 1983 to 1989, he was elected general councilor in the canton of the same name in 2004, in a three-way race, obtaining 38.72% of the vote.

After becoming departmental secretary of the Union for a Popular Movement (UMP), he broke ranks during the 2007 legislative elections, running against incumbent Mansour Kamardine and receiving only 4.08% of the vote in the first round.

On March 20, 2008, he succeeded Saïd Omar Oili as president of the Mayotte General Council thanks to an alliance between the local UMP and the Mouvement départementaliste mahorais (MDM). These two movements joined forces against the New Impetus for Mayotte (NEMA) in order to quickly organize a referendum on the departmentalization of Mayotte.

In the 2011 cantonal elections, Ahmed Attoumani Douchina was easily re-elected as a general councilor, but several left-wing candidates narrowly won renewable cantons in Mayotte, leading to a change in the majority within the general council. On April 3, 2011, three days after Mayotte became the 101st French department, Daniel Zaïdani was elected president of the general council, obtaining 10 votes to Ahmed Attoumani Douchina's 9.

On November 15, 2012, he left the UMP to join the Union of Democrats and Independents.

In March 2015, he was elected departmental councilor for the Canton of Bouéni alongside Afidati Mkadara.
