= St. Michael's Church, Dzaoudzi =

St. Michael's Church
- Église de Saint-Michel
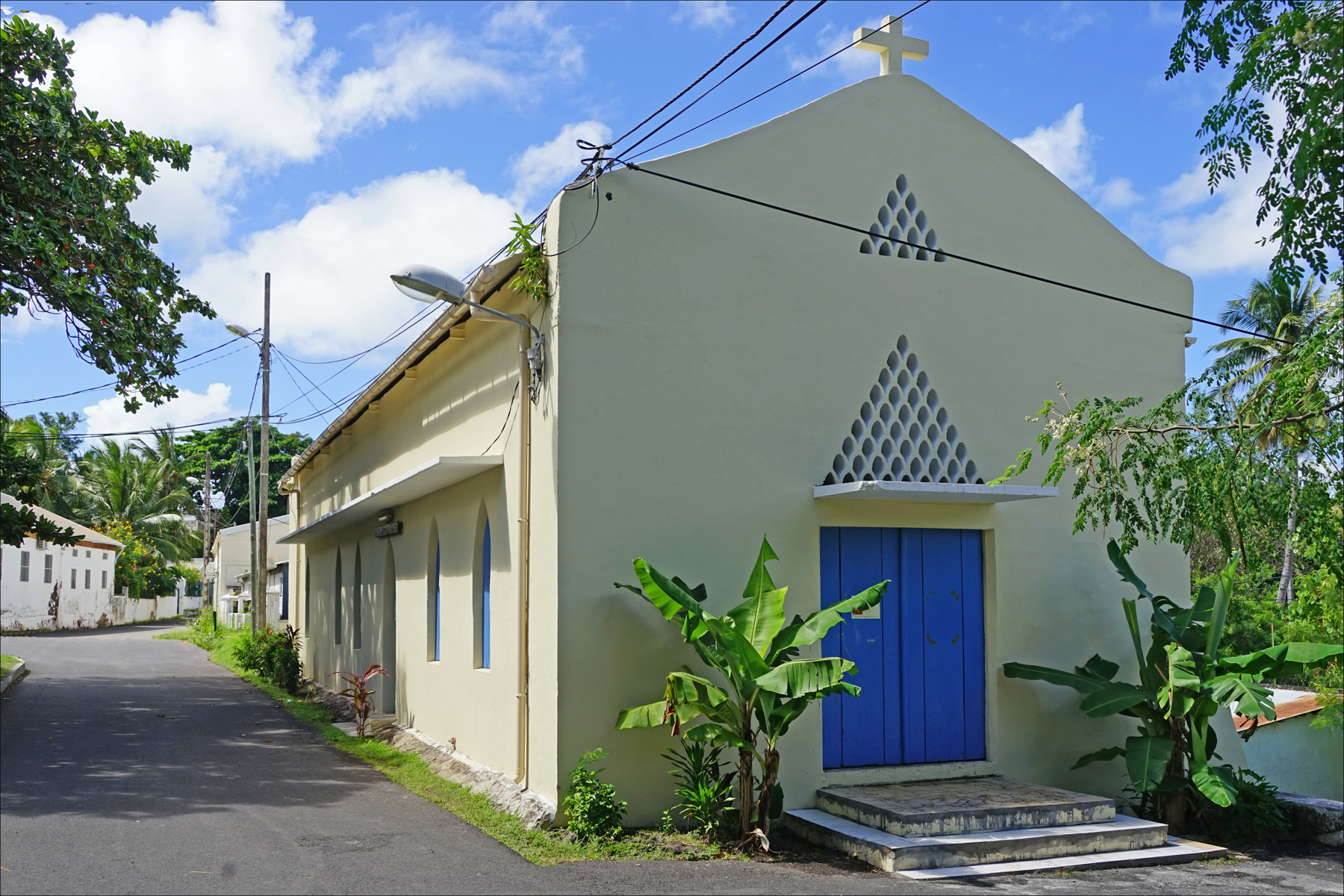

- Location in Mayotte
- 12.7811°S 45.2552°E
- Location: Dzaoudzi, Mayotte
- Country: France
- Denomination: Roman Catholic Church

The St. Michael's Church (French: Église de Saint-Michel) or simply the Church of Dzaoudzi, is a religious building belonging to the Catholic Church and is located in the town of Dzaoudzi in the French overseas department of Mayotte, in the Indian Ocean.

The church whose foundations date back to 1849, is the Roman or Latin rite and depends on the mission of the Church of Our Lady of Fatima based in Mamoudzou, which in turn is within the jurisdiction of the Vicariate of the archipelago of the Comoros (Apostolicus Vicariatus Insularum Comorensium).

== See also ==
- Roman Catholicism in Mayotte
