= Estelle Youssouffa =

French politician (born 1978)

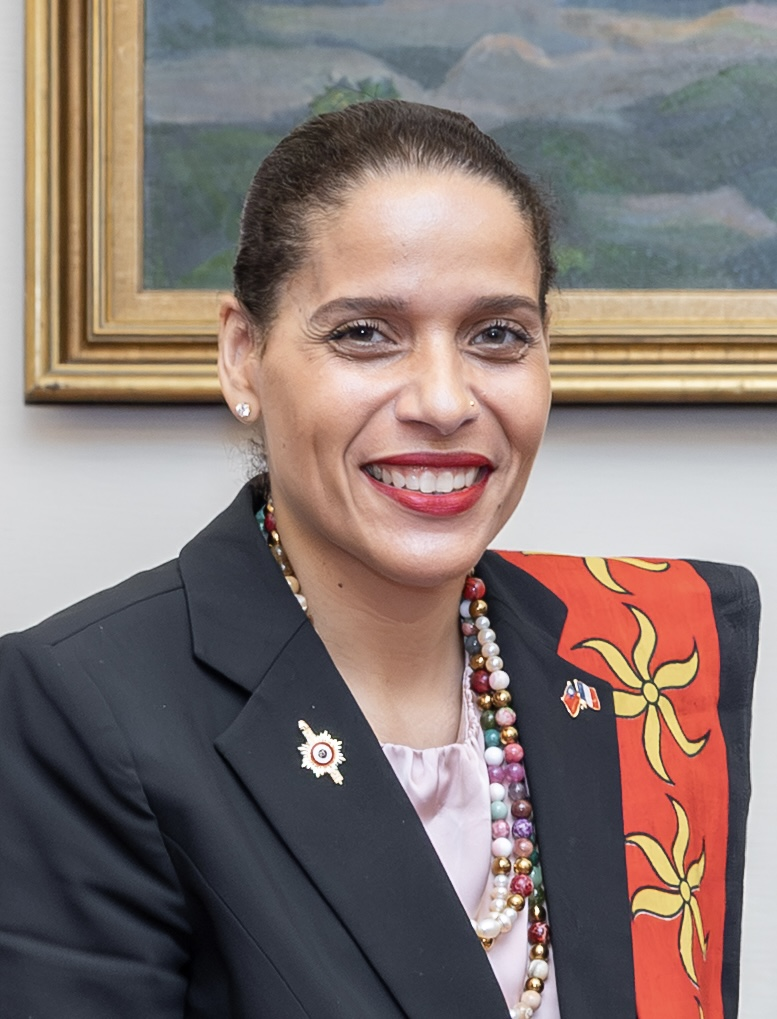
- Youssouffa in 2026

Member of the National Assembly for Department of Mayotte
- Incumbent
- Assumed office 22 June 2022
- Preceded by: Ramlati Ali
- Constituency: Mayotte I

Personal details
- Born: 31 July 1978 (age 47) Châtenay-Malabry, France
- Party: Union of Democrats and Independents (2022–present)
- Occupation: Journalist

Estelle Youssouffa (French pronunciation: [ɛstɛl jusufa]; born 31 July 1978) is a French politician and journalist who has served as the deputy for the 1st constituency of Mayotte since 2022. A member of the Union of Democrats and Independents (UDI), she sits with the Liberties, Independents, Overseas and Territories (LIOT) group in the National Assembly.

== Biography ==
Estelle Youssouffa was born in Châtenay-Malabry, France, to a Maorais military father and a metropolitan nurse mother.

She continued her schooling in Mayotte until she obtained her baccalaureate at Mamoudzou High School.

She then attended the IUT of Tours where she was trained in journalism, then continued her studies at the University of Quebec in Canada in Political Science.

She became a journalist and television host working for LCI, TV5 Monde, Al Jazeera English, BFM TV and iTélé.

=== Political career ===
She was active during the crisis that paralyzed the island in 2018, following which she stood as a candidate in the Mayotte legislative elections which took place in 2022, for the first constituency of Mayotte.

On 19 June 2022 she was elected deputy for Mayotte's 1st constituency, succeeding Ramlati Ali. She was re-elected in 2024.

On June 22, 2022, she joined the Liberties, Independents, Overseas and Territories group, for which she sits on the Foreign Affairs Committee. Similarly, with six other deputies, she was appointed vice-president of the overseas delegation of the National Assembly.
