= Longoni, Mayotte =

Coordinates: 12°44′5″S 45°9′48″E

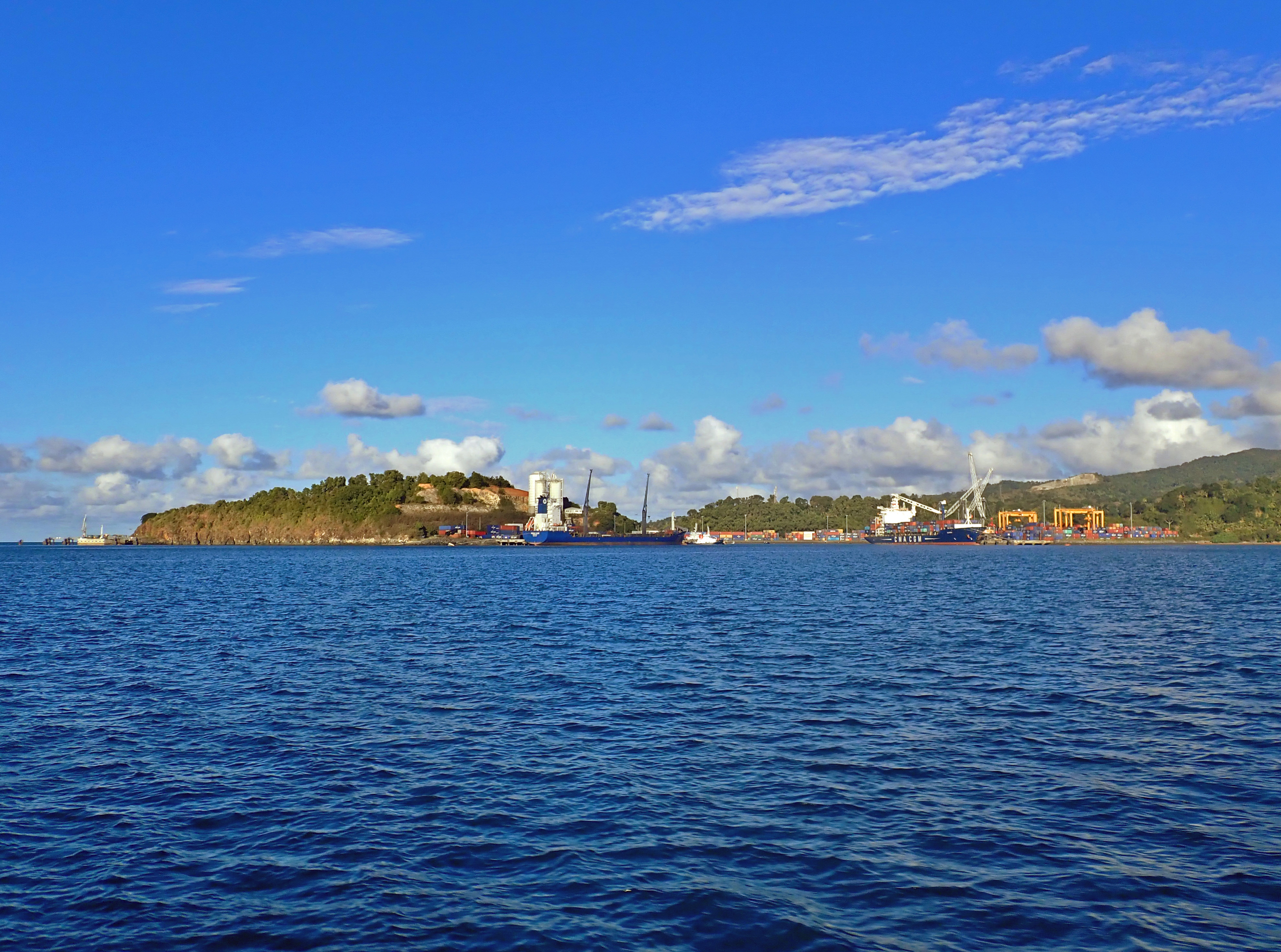

Longoni is a village in the commune of Koungou on Mayotte.

This village is known in particular due to its commercial port which is the only one in Mayotte.
