= Echati Maoulida =

Mahorese activist (1935–2019)

- Born: Echati Maoulida Mwenge; March 13, 1935; Bouéni, Mayotte
- Died: September 15, 2019 (aged 84); Bouéni, Mayotte
- Citizenship: France
- Organization: Chatouilleuses

Echati Maoulida, full name Echati Maoulida Mwenge, was a Mahorese activist who promoted the culture of the department and advocated for its separation from Comoros.

== Biography ==
Maoulida was born in 1935 in the canton of Bouéni on the island of Grand-Terre in Mayotte. In the 1960s and 70s, she was a member of the Chatouilleuses movement, a women's activist group which used tickle torture to coerce politicians into supporting Mayotte's separation from Comoros. Additionally, Maoulida campaigned for increased educational opportunities for young boys and girls.

As a fundi, or spiritual leader, Maoulida was able to travel all over the island of Mayotte. She began singing in her hometown, learning the political and religious songs known as maulida at a Koranic school. Throughout her life, she visited religious services to sing the memorized songs.

Maoulida died at the age of 84 in 2019. She was the last living member of the Chatouilleuses, with her death causing a call by the Collective of the Citizens of Mayotte to begin efforts to collect oral histories from the island's elders, and to name a new school in her honor.
