= Saïd Omar Oili =

Mayotte politician (born 1957)

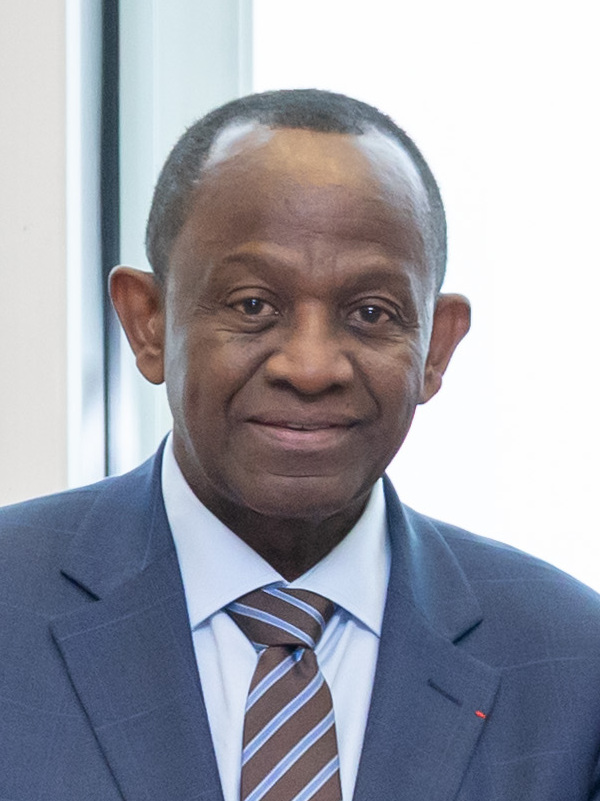
- Oili at the European Commission in 2026

Member of the French Senate from Mayotte
- Incumbent
- Assumed office September 24, 2023
- Preceded by: Abdallah Hassani

Saïd Omar Oili (born 20 June 1957) was the president of the General Council of Mayotte from 8 April 2004 to 19 March 2008. He has been mayor of Dzaoudzi since 2014 (reelected in 2020).
