= Ouangani =

Commune in Mayotte, France

- Commune
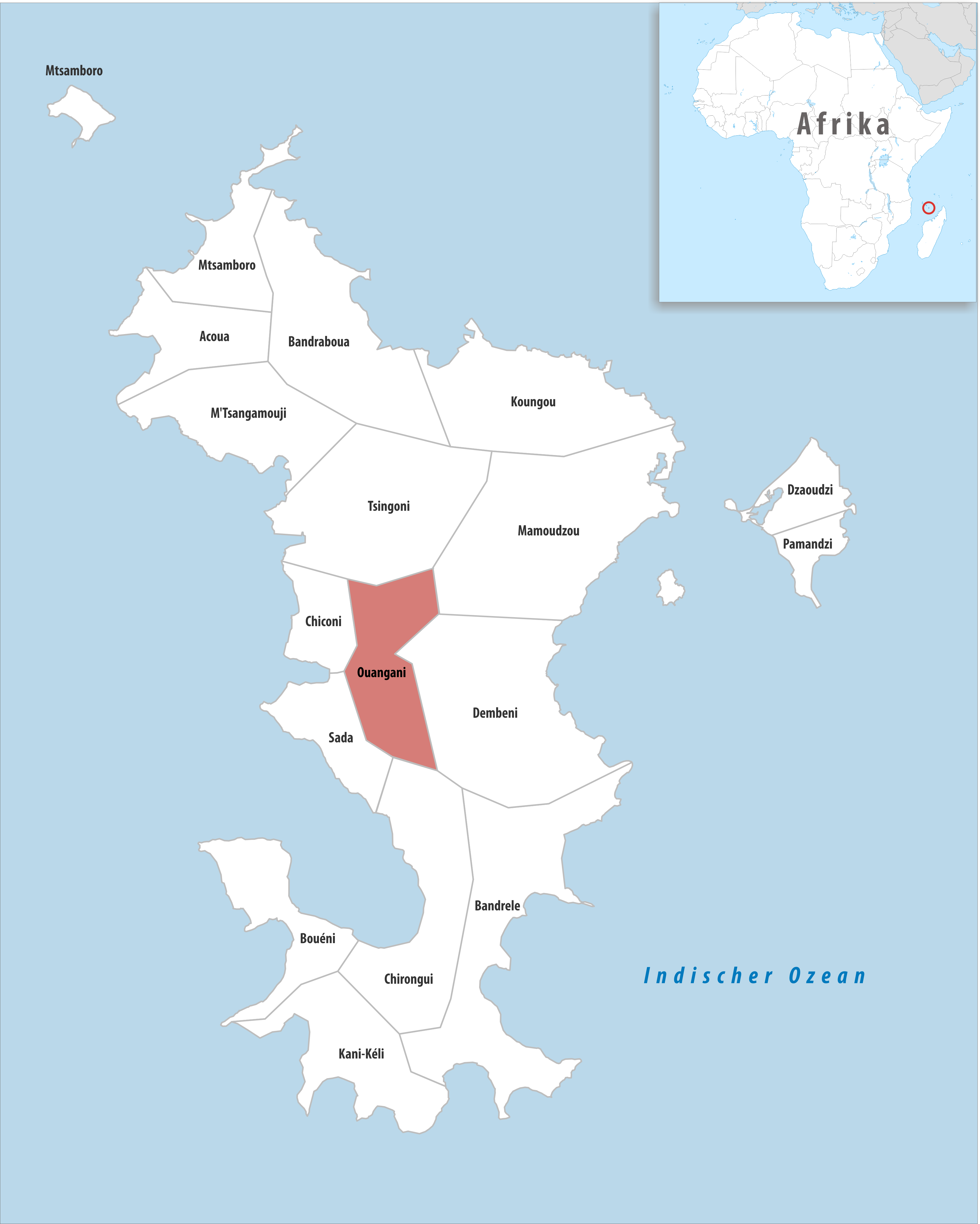
- Location of the commune (in red) within Mayotte
- Location of Ouangani
- Coordinates: 12°50′55″S 45°08′41″E
- Country: France
- Overseas region and department: Mayotte
- Canton: Ouangani

Government
  - Mayor (2020–2026): Youssouf Ambdi
- Area^{1}: 18.5 km^{2} (7.1 sq mi)
- Population (2017): 10,203
  - Density: 552/km^{2} (1,430/sq mi)
- Time zone: UTC+03:00
- INSEE/Postal code: 97614 /97670
- ^{1} French Land Register data, which excludes lakes, ponds, glaciers > 1 km^{2} (0.386 sq mi or 247 acres) and river estuaries.

Ouangani (French pronunciation: [wɑ̃ɡani]) is a commune in the French overseas department of Mayotte, in the Indian Ocean.

== Geography ==
=== Climate ===
Ouangani has a tropical savanna climate (Köppen climate classification Aw). The average annual temperature in Ouangani is 25.2 °C (77.4 °F). The average annual rainfall is 1,611.2 mm (63.43 in) with January as the wettest month. The temperatures are highest on average in January, at around 26.9 °C (80.4 °F), and lowest in August, at around 23.1 °C (73.6 °F). The highest temperature ever recorded in Ouangani was 35.7 °C (96.3 °F) on 6 October 1999; the coldest temperature ever recorded was 10.0 °C (50.0 °F) on 21 September 2001.

Climate data for Ouangani (1981–2010 averages, extremes 1992−present)
| Month | Jan | Feb | Mar | Apr | May | Jun | Jul | Aug | Sep | Oct | Nov | Dec | Year |
|---|---|---|---|---|---|---|---|---|---|---|---|---|---|
| Record high °C (°F) | 35.5 (95.9) | 35.0 (95.0) | 35.0 (95.0) | 35.0 (95.0) | 34.0 (93.2) | 33.0 (91.4) | 32.0 (89.6) | 32.5 (90.5) | 32.7 (90.9) | 35.7 (96.3) | 34.0 (93.2) | 34.5 (94.1) | 35.7 (96.3) |
| Mean daily maximum °C (°F) | 31.4 (88.5) | 31.5 (88.7) | 31.7 (89.1) | 31.8 (89.2) | 31.0 (87.8) | 29.8 (85.6) | 29.1 (84.4) | 29.3 (84.7) | 29.5 (85.1) | 30.1 (86.2) | 30.8 (87.4) | 31.3 (88.3) | 30.6 (87.1) |
| Daily mean °C (°F) | 26.9 (80.4) | 26.8 (80.2) | 26.8 (80.2) | 26.5 (79.7) | 25.4 (77.7) | 24.0 (75.2) | 23.2 (73.8) | 23.1 (73.6) | 23.5 (74.3) | 24.5 (76.1) | 25.7 (78.3) | 26.3 (79.3) | 25.2 (77.4) |
| Mean daily minimum °C (°F) | 22.4 (72.3) | 22.2 (72.0) | 22.0 (71.6) | 21.1 (70.0) | 19.9 (67.8) | 18.2 (64.8) | 17.2 (63.0) | 17.0 (62.6) | 17.5 (63.5) | 18.9 (66.0) | 20.5 (68.9) | 21.4 (70.5) | 19.8 (67.6) |
| Record low °C (°F) | 18.0 (64.4) | 19.0 (66.2) | 18.7 (65.7) | 15.0 (59.0) | 14.7 (58.5) | 12.5 (54.5) | 11.0 (51.8) | 12.0 (53.6) | 10.0 (50.0) | 14.0 (57.2) | 15.0 (59.0) | 18.0 (64.4) | 10.0 (50.0) |
| Average precipitation mm (inches) | 350.7 (13.81) | 290.2 (11.43) | 261.5 (10.30) | 120.1 (4.73) | 36.8 (1.45) | 25.6 (1.01) | 14.0 (0.55) | 20.1 (0.79) | 36.1 (1.42) | 87.3 (3.44) | 107.8 (4.24) | 261.0 (10.28) | 1,611.2 (63.43) |
| Average precipitation days (≥ 1.0 mm) | 16.5 | 14.7 | 16.0 | 9.8 | 4.1 | 3.6 | 2.9 | 3.3 | 4.3 | 8.4 | 8.9 | 14.3 | 106.7 |
| Mean monthly sunshine hours | 148.6 | 132.3 | 157.5 | 187.2 | 214.5 | 209.0 | 221.2 | 219.2 | 190.2 | 181.9 | 170.6 | 171.5 | 2,203.6 |
Source: Meteociel
