= Soibahadine Ibrahim Ramadani =

French politician (born 1949)

- Born: 5 March 1949 (age 77)
- Citizenship: French
- Political party: Union for a Popular Movement (now The Republicans)

Soibahadine Ibrahim Ramadani (French pronunciation: [swabaadin ibʁaim ʁamadani]; born 5 March 1949) is a French and Mahoran politician and formerly a member of the Senate of France, representing the island of Mayotte.

He is a member of The Republicans and before that, its predecessor the Union for a Popular Movement. From 2 April 2015 until 1 July 2021, he was the President of the Departmental Council of Mayotte, the deliberative assembly for the Overseas Department and Region of Mayotte.
