= Movement for the Development of Mayotte =

Political party in Mayotte

The Movement for the Development of Mayotte (French: Mouvement pour le développement de Mayotte; formerly the Mahoran Departmentalist Movement; French: Mouvement Départementaliste Mahorais) is a political party in the French overseas department of Mayotte. In the 2004 Mahoran departmental election for the General Council of Mayotte the party won 23.3% of the popular vote and 6 out of 19 seats.

== See also ==
- Category:Movement for the Development of Mayotte politicians
