= Boinali Saïd =

French politician

Boinali Saïd Toumbou
- Born: 25 September 1960 (age 66); Dzaoudzi, Mayotte, France

Boinali Saïd Toumbou (born 25 September 1960 in Dzaoudzi, Mayotte) is a French politician who was elected to the French National Assembly on 17 June 2012, representing the 1st constituency of the department of Mayotte. He is a former trade union leader. He stood down at the 2017 legislative election.

== See also ==
- List of deputies of the 14th National Assembly of France
