= Daniel Zaïdani =

President of the General Council of Mayotte (born 1975)

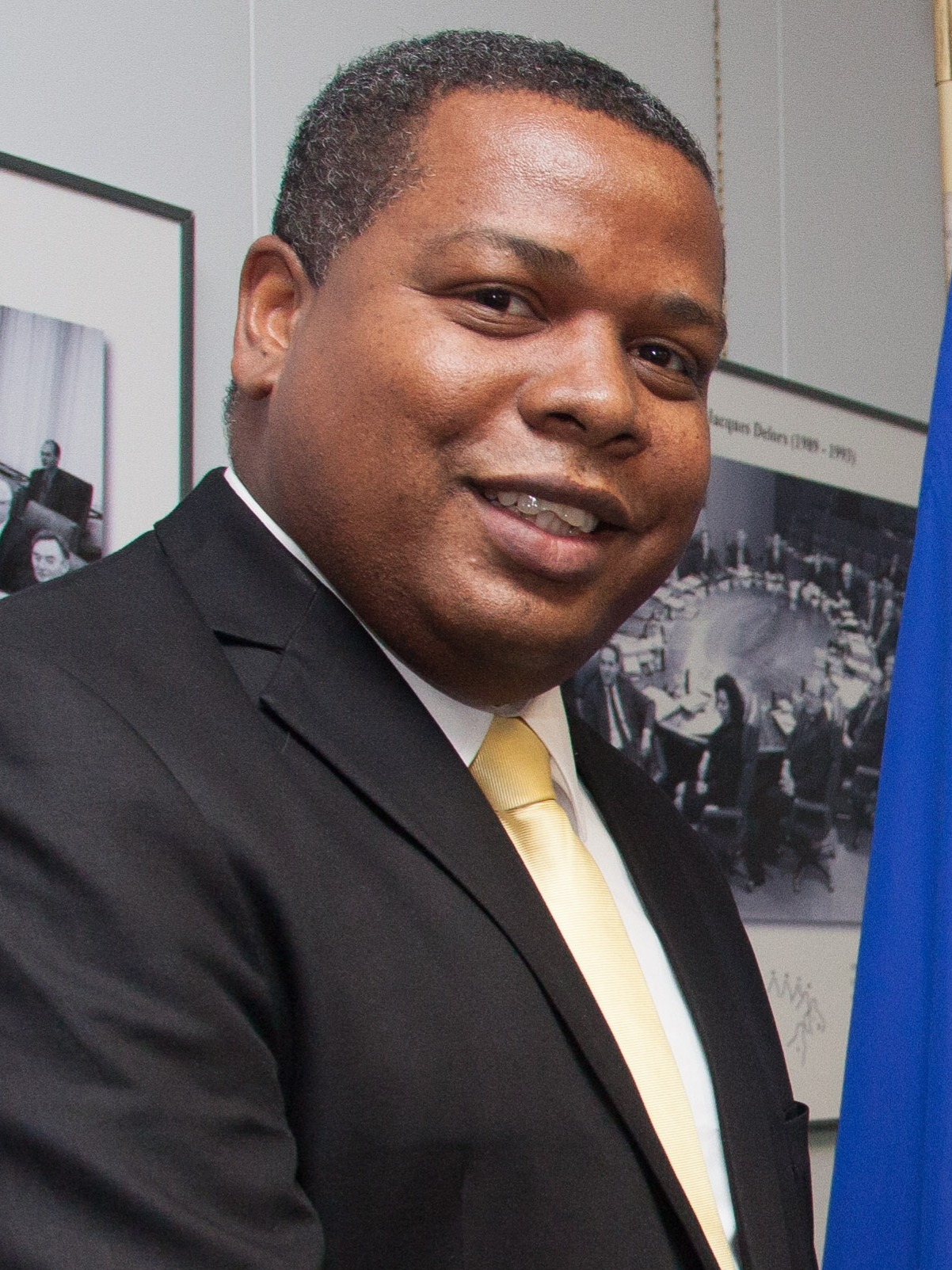
Portrait photograph of Daniel Zaïdani

Daniel Zaïdani (born 14 May 1975) is a Mayotte politician, who has served as the President of the Members of the Departmental Council of Mayotte since succeeding Ahmed Attoumani Douchina on 3 April 2011.
