= Dzaoudzi =

Commune in Mayotte, France

- Commune
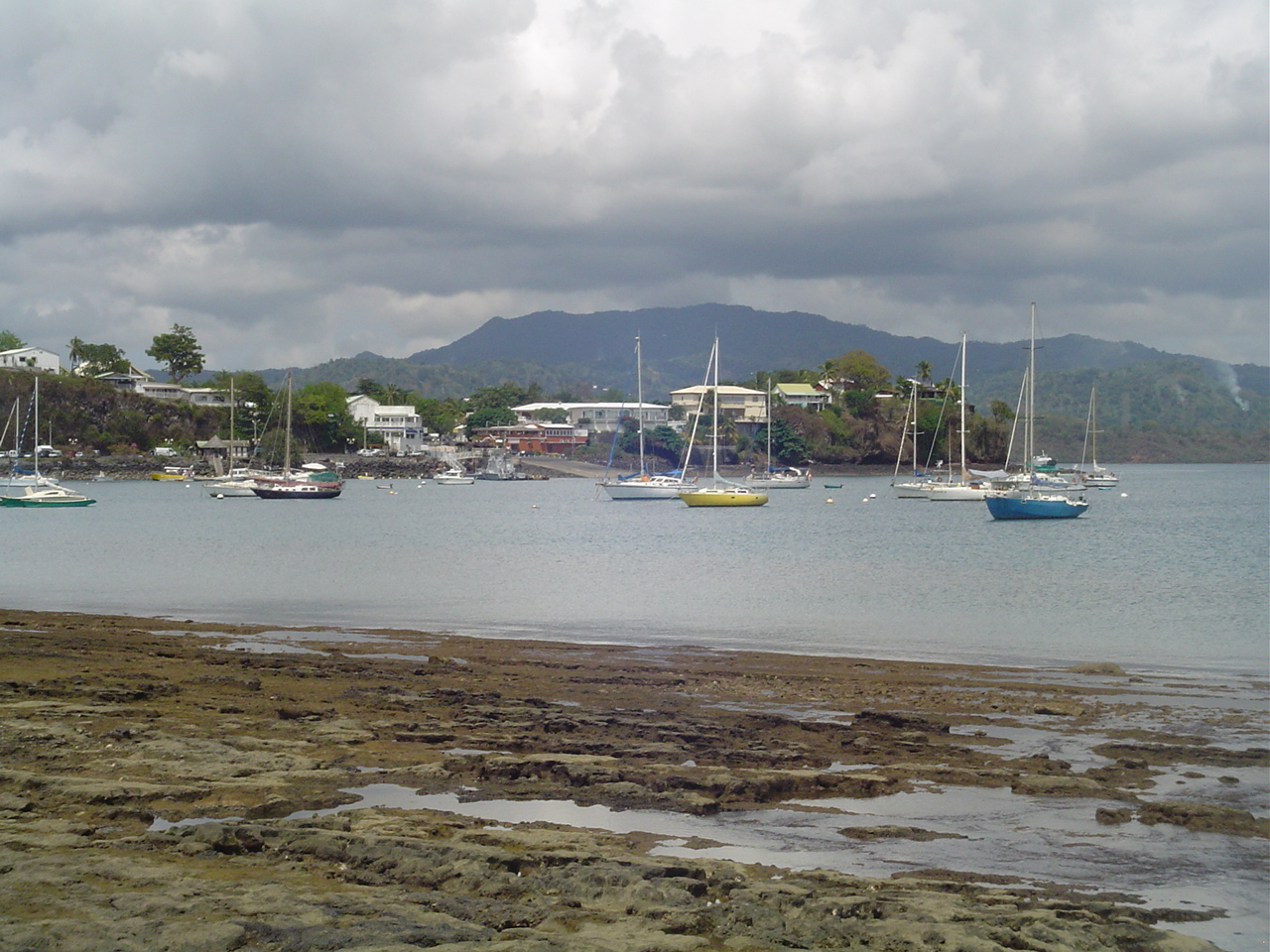
- Dzaoudzi harbour

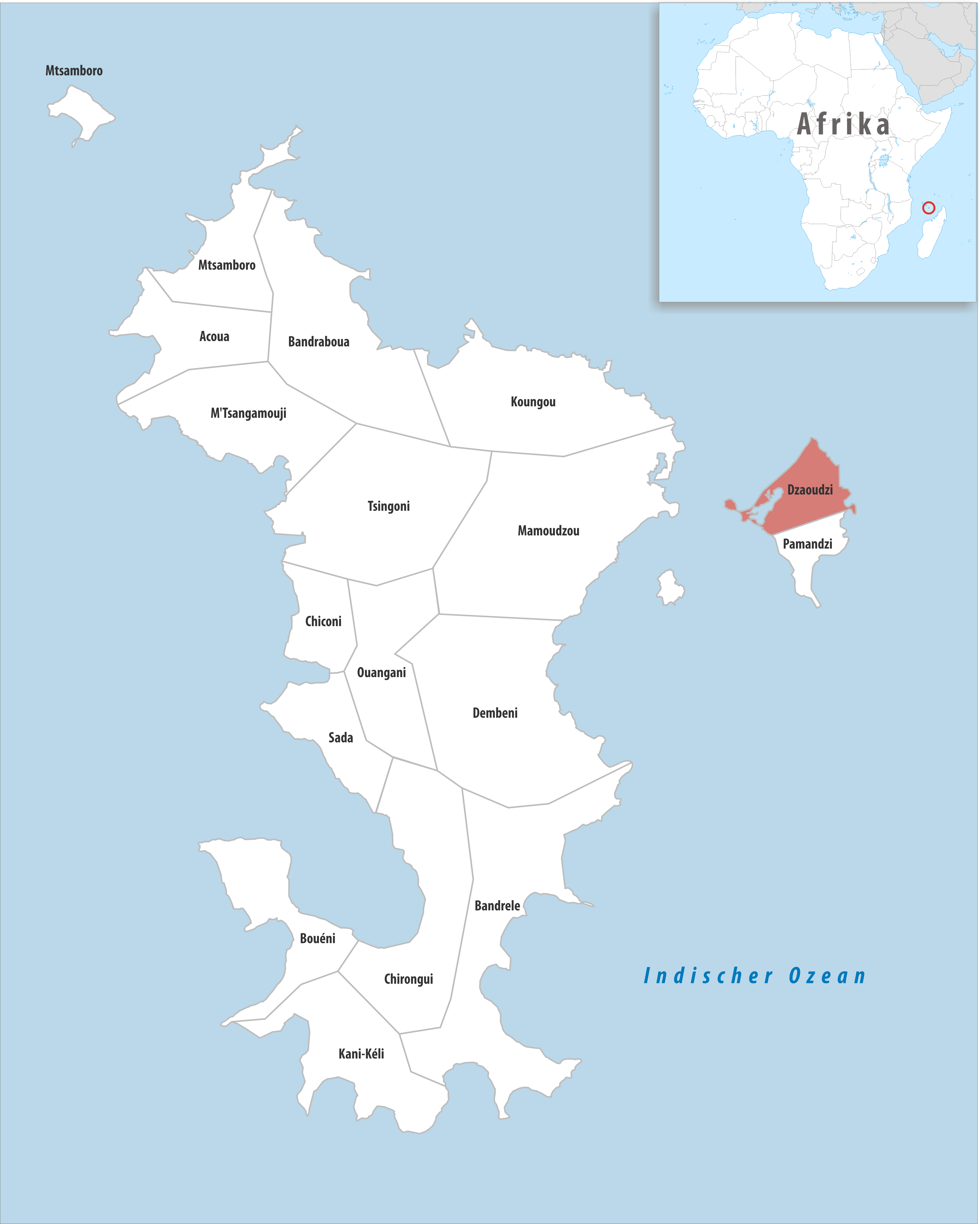
- Location of the commune (in red) within Mayotte
- Location of Dzaoudzi
- Coordinates: 12°47′24″S 45°16′50″E
- Country: France
- Overseas region and department: Mayotte
- Canton: Dzaoudzi
- Intercommunality: Petite-Terre

Government
  - Mayor (2023–2026): Mikidache Houmadi
- Area^{1}: 7.87 km^{2} (3.04 sq mi)
- Population (2017): 17,831
  - Density: 2,270/km^{2} (5,870/sq mi)
- Time zone: UTC+03:00
- INSEE/Postal code: 97608 /97615
- ^{1} French Land Register data, which excludes lakes, ponds, glaciers > 1 km^{2} (0.386 sq mi or 247 acres) and river estuaries.

Dzaoudzi (French pronunciation: [dzaudzi]) is a commune in the French overseas department of Mayotte, in the Indian Ocean. The commune of Dzaoudzi (sometimes called Dzaoudzi-Labattoir [dzaudzi labatwaʁ]), made up of the twin towns of Dzaoudzi and Labattoir, is located on the small island of Petite-Terre (or Pamanzi). It was previously the capital of Mayotte, but the capital was relocated in 1977 to Mamoudzou, on the island of Grande-Terre (Maore), the main island of Mayotte.

The Foreign Legion Detachment in Mayotte has been based in Dzaoudzi since 1973.

== Geography ==
The town of Dzaoudzi is located on a rocky outcropping which was once a separate islet. It is now linked to Pamanzi Island and the rest of Dzaoudzi Commune by the Boulevard des Crabes, a road constructed atop an artificial dike.

== Climate ==
Dzaoudzi features a tropical wet and dry climate under the Köppen climate classification. The wet season spans from December through April while the dry season covers the remaining seven months. Dzaoudzi is slightly cooler during the peak of its dry season with average temperatures hovering around 23 °C (73 °F) during its cooler period. Average temperatures are 27 °C (81 °F) during its warmest period. The town sees roughly 1,000 millimetres (39 in) of precipitation annually.

Climate data for Dzaoudzi
| Month | Jan | Feb | Mar | Apr | May | Jun | Jul | Aug | Sep | Oct | Nov | Dec | Year |
|---|---|---|---|---|---|---|---|---|---|---|---|---|---|
| Record high °C (°F) | 35 (95) | 34 (93) | 33 (91) | 33 (91) | 33 (91) | 31 (88) | 30 (86) | 32 (90) | 32 (90) | 33 (91) | 35 (95) | 37 (99) | 37 (99) |
| Mean daily maximum °C (°F) | 30 (86) | 30 (86) | 30 (86) | 30 (86) | 28 (82) | 27 (81) | 26 (79) | 26 (79) | 28 (82) | 29 (84) | 31 (88) | 31 (88) | 29 (84) |
| Mean daily minimum °C (°F) | 24 (75) | 24 (75) | 24 (75) | 24 (75) | 23 (73) | 22 (72) | 21 (70) | 21 (70) | 21 (70) | 22 (72) | 23 (73) | 24 (75) | 23 (73) |
| Record low °C (°F) | 20 (68) | 21 (70) | 20 (68) | 20 (68) | 17 (63) | 16 (61) | 16 (61) | 16 (61) | 17 (63) | 13 (55) | 18 (64) | 21 (70) | 13 (55) |
| Average precipitation mm (inches) | 250 (9.8) | 210 (8.3) | 180 (7.2) | 86 (3.4) | 36 (1.4) | 10 (0.4) | 7.6 (0.3) | 10 (0.4) | 20 (0.8) | 48 (1.9) | 58 (2.3) | 140 (5.6) | 1,060 (41.6) |
| Average relative humidity (%) | 82 | 83 | 84 | 82 | 79 | 79 | 77 | 79 | 80 | 78 | 79 | 78 | 80 |
Source: Weatherbase

== Demographics ==
The commune is home to 17,831 (Census 2017), the majority of whom live in the town of Labattoir.

Historical population
| Year | Pop. | ±% p.a. |
|---|---|---|
| 1966 | 2,967 | — |
| 1978 | 4,147 | +2.83% |
| 1985 | 5,865 | +5.08% |
| 1991 | 8,257 | +5.87% |
| 1997 | 10,792 | +4.56% |
| 2002 | 12,308 | +2.66% |
| 2007 | 15,354 | +4.52% |
| 2012 | 14,311 | −1.40% |
| 2017 | 17,831 | +4.50% |
Source: SPLAF (1966-2007) and INSEE (2012-2017)

== Transportation ==
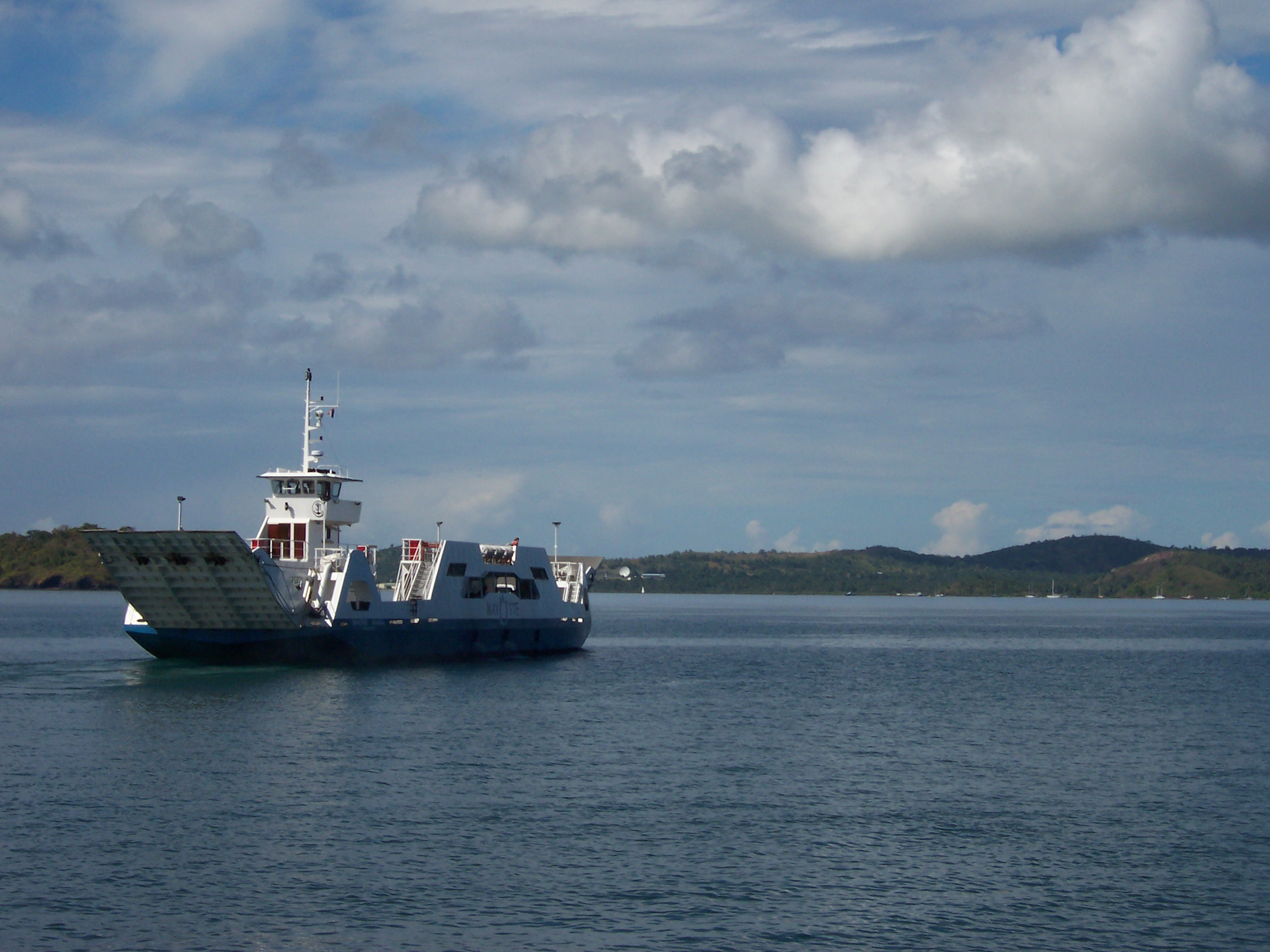
Ferry in motion between Dzaoudzi and Mamoudzou

A system of ferry barges operated by the Société des Transports Maritimes link Dzaoudzi to the island of Grande-Terre.

The Dzaoudzi Pamandzi International Airport, the main airport of Mayotte, is located on Pamanzi Island in the neighboring commune of Pamandzi.

== See also ==
- St. Michael's Church
