= Koungou =

Commune in Mayotte, France

- Commune
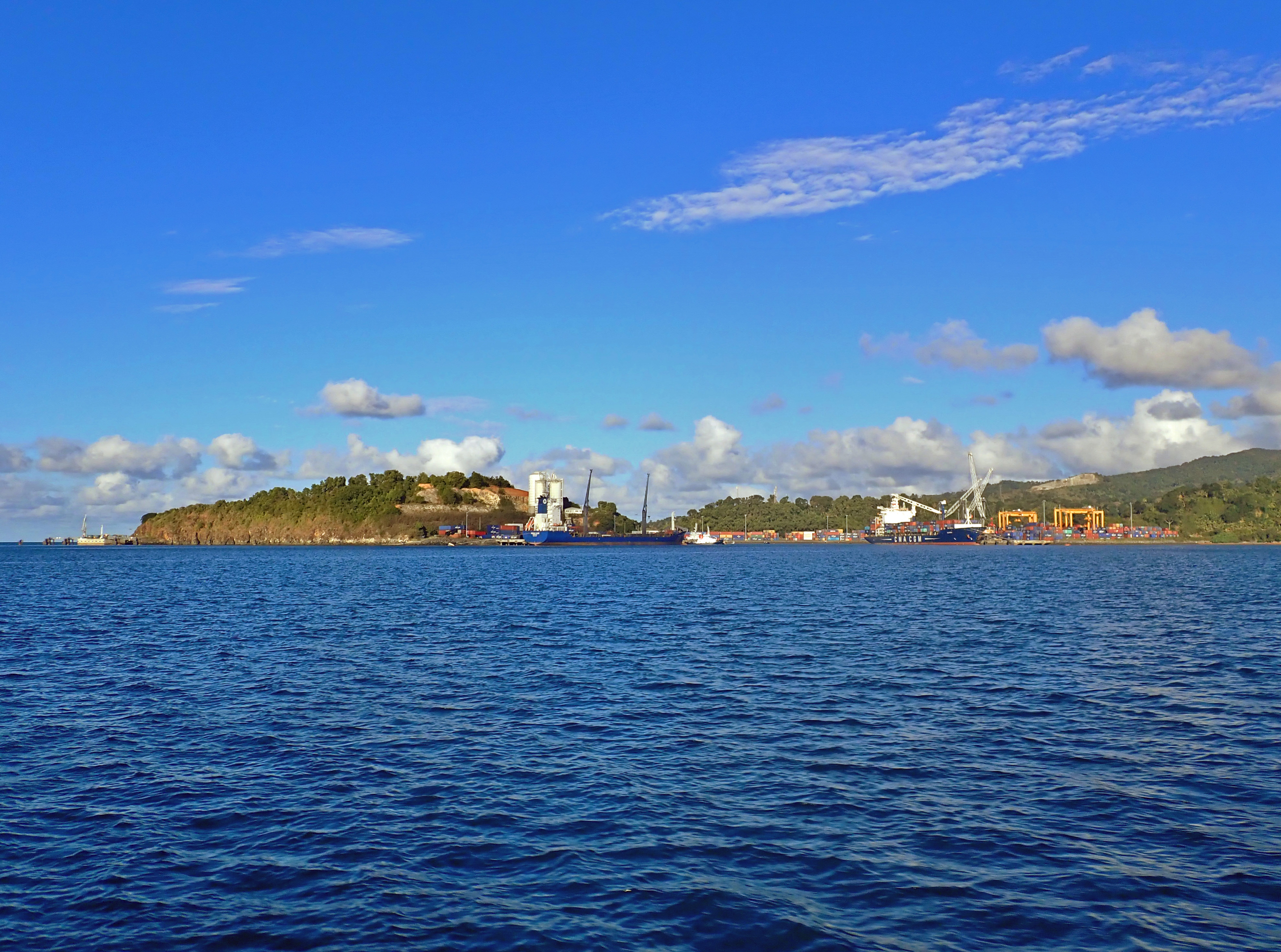

- Coat of arms

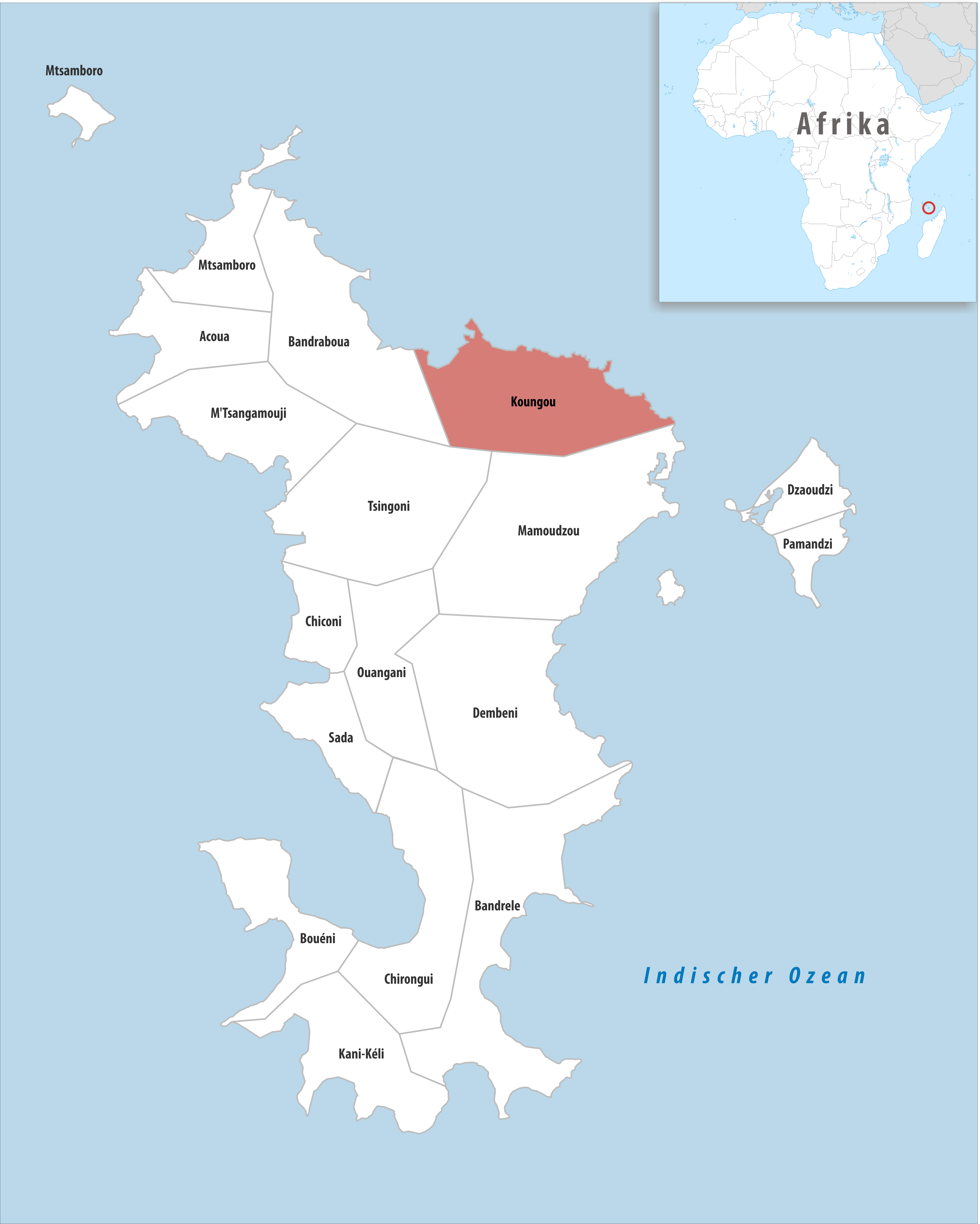
- Location of the commune (in red) within Mayotte
- Location of Koungou
- Coordinates: 12°44′19″S 45°12′26″E
- Country: France
- Overseas region and department: Mayotte
- Canton: Bandraboua and Koungou
- Intercommunality: CA Grand Nord de Mayotte

Government
  - Mayor (2020–2026): Assani Saindou Bamcolo
- Area^{1}: 28.43 km^{2} (10.98 sq mi)
- Population (2017): 32,156
  - Density: 1,131/km^{2} (2,929/sq mi)
- Time zone: UTC+03:00
- INSEE/Postal code: 97610 /97600
- ^{1} French Land Register data, which excludes lakes, ponds, glaciers > 1 km^{2} (0.386 sq mi or 247 acres) and river estuaries.

Koungou (French pronunciation: [kuŋɡu]) is the second largest commune in the French overseas department of Mayotte, in the Indian Ocean, after the capital Mamoudzou. It is composed of six villages: Majicavo Lamir, Majicavo Koropa, Koungou, Trévani, Kangani and Longoni.

== Population ==
Historical population
Year	Pop.	±% p.a.
1966	1,293	—
1978	2,362	+5.15%
1985	3,479	+5.69%
1991	6,046	+9.65%
1997	10,165	+9.05%
2002	15,383	+8.64%
2007	19,843	+5.22%
2012	26,488	+5.95%
2017	32,156	+3.95%
Source: SPLAF (1966-2007) and INSEE (2012-2017)
