= Younoussa Bamana =

Mayotte politician (1935–2007)

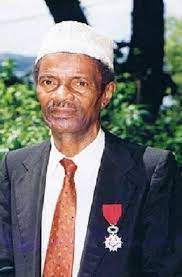
Younoussa Bamana

Younoussa Bamana (April 1, 1935 – June 22, 2007) was a politician from Mayotte who served in the French National Assembly from 1977 to 1981.

On June 23, 2008, a postage stamp showing Younoussa Bamana was issued.

Since 2010, there was a high school named Younoussa-Bamana (LYB) located in Mamoudzou.

== Biography ==
A teacher by profession, Younoussa Bamana was drawn to politics at a time when Mayotte had to choose between "remaining French or becoming independent." He was president of the district council of Mayotte, an island that was then part of the French overseas territory of the Comoros.

On July 21, 1975, shortly after the declaration of independence of the three other islands in the archipelago, he was elected prefect of Mayotte by the district council. He thus managed the continuity of public services, particularly postal services, at a time when there was a shortage of postage stamps.

He then served as president of the Departmental Council of Mayotte from July 6, 1977, to April 2, 2004. He was a strong advocate for Mayotte remaining a French island, while the other islands in the Comoro Islands gained independence.

He died on June 22, 2007, in Mamoudzou, at the age of 72.

== Bibliography ==
- "Les députés de la Ve République : M. Younoussa Bamana". Assemblée nationale (in French).
