= Mansour Kamardine =

French lawyer and politician (born 1959)

Mansour Kamardine (born 23 March 1959 in Sada, Mayotte) is a French lawyer and politician of the Republicans (LR) who has served as a member of the French National Assembly from 2002 until 2007 and again since 2017, representing Mayotte. He was the MP for Mayotte's 2nd constituency. In 2024 French legislative election, he lost his seat to an RN candidate Anchya Bamana.

== Bibliography ==
- page on the French National Assembly website
