= Departmental Council of Mayotte =

Local government in Mayotte, France

Departmental Council of Mayotte Conseil départemental de Mayotte
- Seal of the Departmental Council

Type
- Type: Unicameral
- Term limits: 6 years

History
- Founded: 1977

Leadership
- President: Ben Issa Ousseni (LR)

Structure
- Seats: 26
- Political groups: Government (18): LR (4); DVD (4); MDM (3); DVC (3); MRGS (2); LREM (1); NEMA (1); Opposition (8): MDM (3); DIV (2); LREM (1); NEMA (1); DVC (1)

Website
- Council Website

The Departmental Council of Mayotte (French: Conseil départemental de Mayotte) is the local authority overseeing the Department of Mayotte. The legislative branch is composed of the council itself acting as a deliberative assembly, while the executive is composed of the President of the Council and their Vice-Presidents. The members of the council, known as Departmental Councillors and 26 in number, are directly elected for a 6-year term in single seat constituencies; half of the seats are renewed every 3 years. It also exercises the responsibilities of a regional council.

Mayotte became an overseas department and region and a single territorial collectivity in 2011, ending its previous unique transitional status of departmental collectivity. Until March 2015 the assembly of a department of France was known as a General Council (French: Conseil Général).

== Structure ==
=== Plenary assembly ===
The council gathers in assembly at least once per trimester. All debates and archives are public; however, the president or 5 members can ask for a session to be private regarding a certain matter.

=== Special commissions ===
In addition to the assembly, there are six commissions whose advice will be seek on the following matters:

- Finances & Economic Development
- Development, Environment & Living Environment
- Health, Social Action & General Administration
- Training & Integration
- Culture, Youth & Sports
- Decentralized Cooperation & Institutional Life

If needed, a commission can propose to the assembly an amendment on a project.

=== Other bodies ===
The Departmental council also comprises two more councils, the Economic, Social and Environmental Council (CESEM) and the Culture, Environment and Education Council (CCEEM), which are consultative assemblies whose role is to advise the elected assembly and the president on the subjects they represent. The CCEEM is composed of 22 unelected members coming from 4 middle schools of the collectivity, with a renewable term of 6 years.

== Presidents of the Council ==
=== Presidents of the General Council (1977–2015) ===
- Younoussa Bamana: 6 July 1977 – March 1991
- Hamissi Assani: March – April 1991
- Younoussa Bamana: 18 April 1991 – 2 April 2004
- Saïd Omar Oili: 2 April 2004 – 28 February 2008
- Ahmed Attoumani Douchina: 20 March 2008 – 3 April 2011
- Daniel Zaïdani: 3 April 2011 – 2 April 2015

=== Presidents of the Departmental Council (2015–present) ===
- Soibahadine Ibrahim Ramadani: 2 April 2015 – 1 July 2021
- Ben Issa Ousseni: 1 July 2021 – present
