= Mahoré People's Movement =

Political party

The Mahoré People's Movement (French: Mouvement populaire mahorais) is a political party in the French overseas department of Mayotte, established in 1963.

In the 2004 Mahoran departmental election for the General Council, the party won 1.2% of the popular vote, and 1 out of 19 seats, having had 4 seats prior to the election.
