= Pamandzi =

Commune in Mayotte, France

- Commune
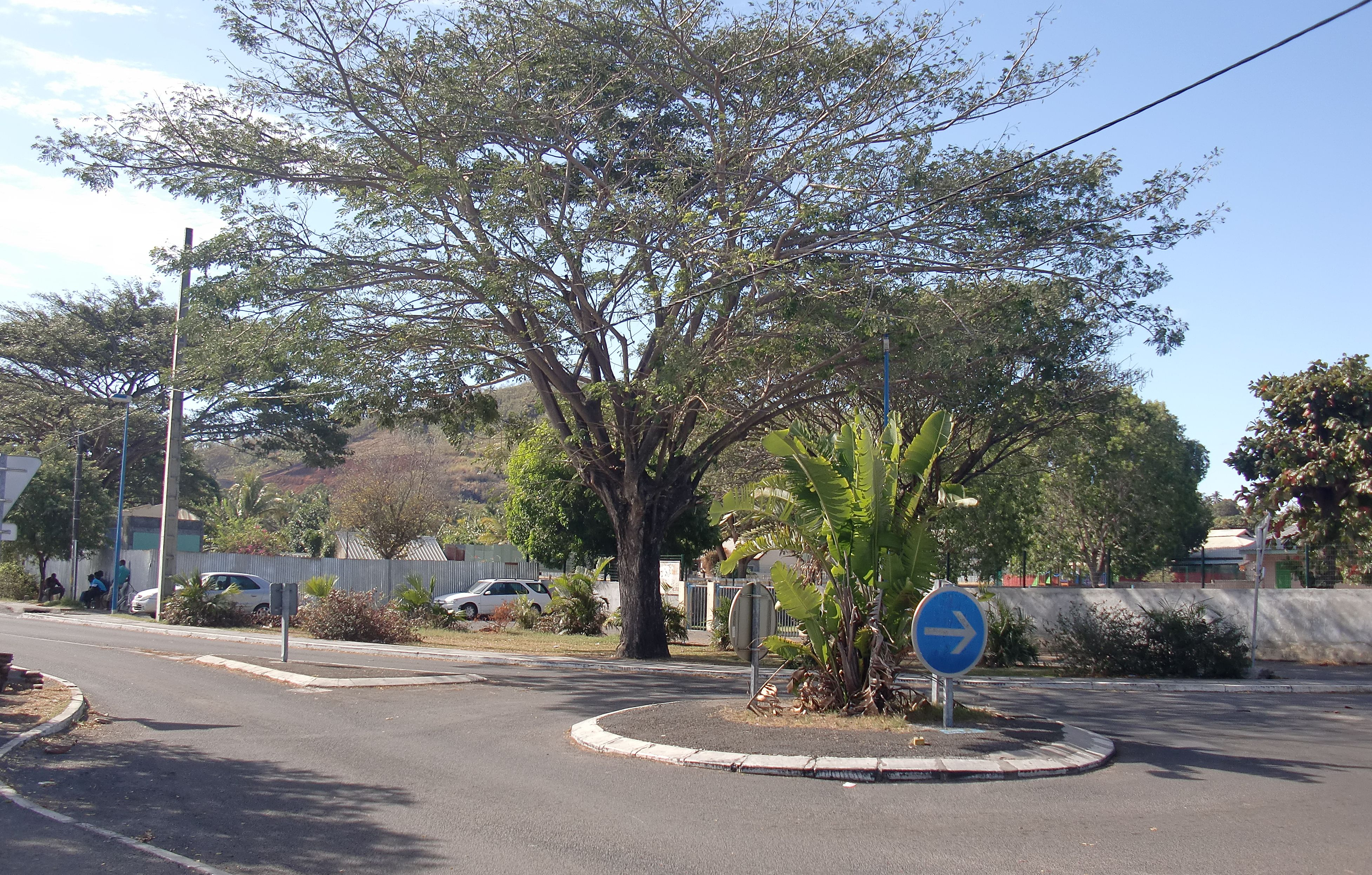
- A roundabout at Pamandzi, with the school to the left

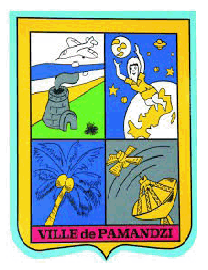
- Coat of arms

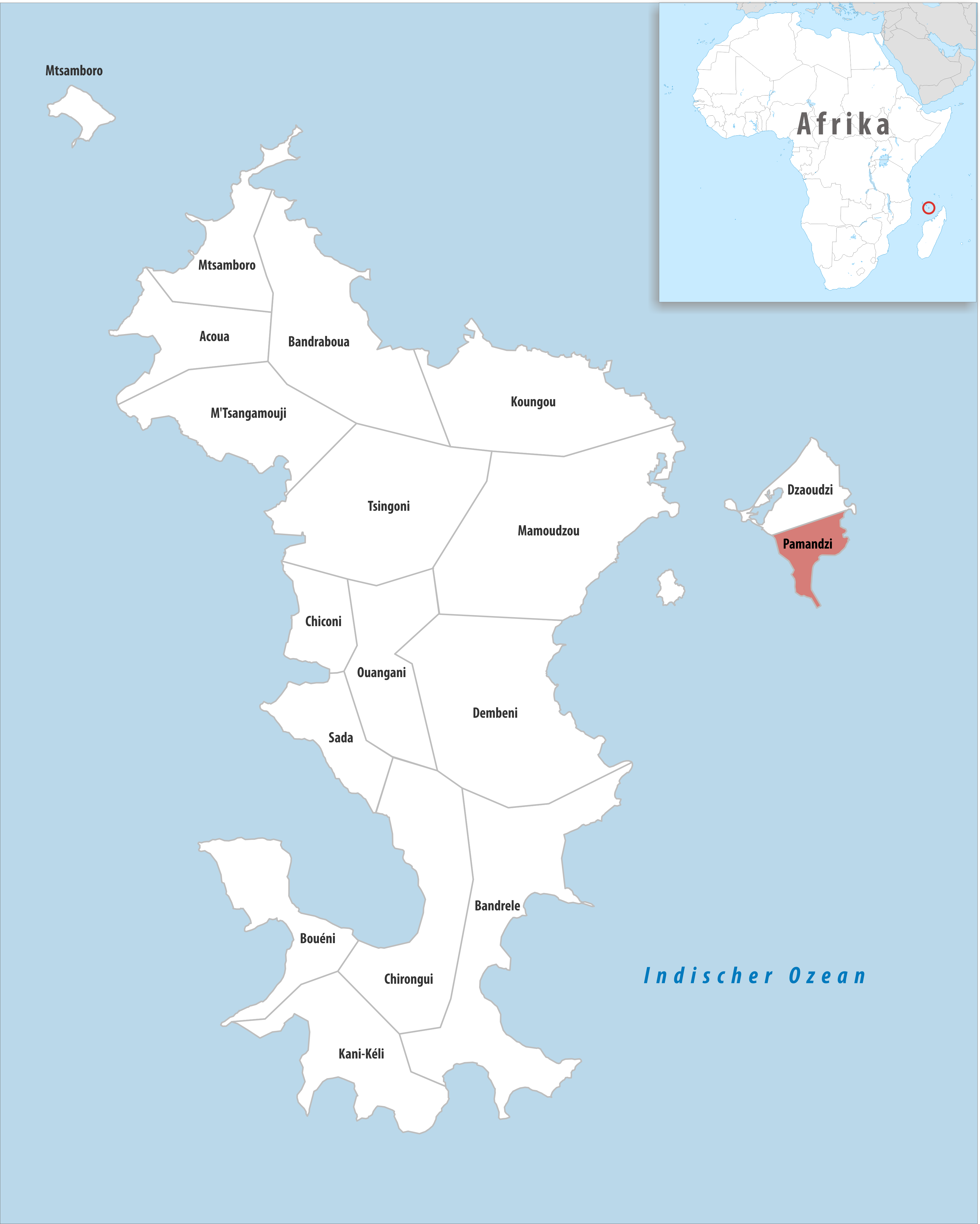
- Location of the commune (in red) within Mayotte
- Location of Pamandzi
- Coordinates: 12°47′55″S 45°16′31″E
- Country: France
- Overseas region and department: Mayotte
- Canton: Pamandzi

Government
  - Mayor (2020–2026): Madi Madi Souf
- Area^{1}: 4.24 km^{2} (1.64 sq mi)
- Highest elevation: 203 m (666 ft)
- Lowest elevation: 0 m (0 ft)
- Population (2017): 11,442
  - Density: 2,700/km^{2} (6,990/sq mi)
- Time zone: UTC+03:00
- INSEE/Postal code: 97615 /97615
- ^{1} French Land Register data, which excludes lakes, ponds, glaciers > 1 km^{2} (0.386 sq mi or 247 acres) and river estuaries.

Pamandzi (French pronunciation: [pamɑ̃dzi]) is a commune in the French overseas department of Mayotte, in the Indian Ocean. The commune of Pamandzi is located on the small island of Petite-Terre (or Pamanzi), off the main island of Mayotte.

The Dzaoudzi–Pamandzi International Airport is located in Pamandzi.

== Climate ==
Pamandzi has a tropical savanna climate (Köppen climate classification Aw). The average annual temperature in Pamandzi is 27.0 °C (80.6 °F). The average annual rainfall is 1,201.8 mm (47.31 in) with January as the wettest month. The temperatures are highest on average in March, at around 28.2 °C (82.8 °F), and lowest in August, at around 24.7 °C (76.5 °F). The highest temperature ever recorded in Pamandzi was 35.0 °C (95.0 °F) on 25 January 1952; the coldest temperature ever recorded was 15.3 °C (59.5 °F) on 10 July 1994.

Climate data for Pamandzi (1991–2020 averages, extremes 1950–present)
Month	Jan	Feb	Mar	Apr	May	Jun	Jul	Aug	Sep	Oct	Nov	Dec	Year
Record high °C (°F)	35.0 (95.0)	33.6 (92.5)	33.8 (92.8)	33.9 (93.0)	33.3 (91.9)	31.6 (88.9)	30.4 (86.7)	31.0 (87.8)	32.1 (89.8)	33.4 (92.1)	34.1 (93.4)	34.2 (93.6)	35.0 (95.0)
Mean daily maximum °C (°F)	30.9 (87.6)	30.9 (87.6)	31.1 (88.0)	31.1 (88.0)	30.1 (86.2)	28.8 (83.8)	27.9 (82.2)	28.0 (82.4)	28.8 (83.8)	29.9 (85.8)	30.6 (87.1)	31.1 (88.0)	29.9 (85.8)
Daily mean °C (°F)	28.1 (82.6)	28.1 (82.6)	28.2 (82.8)	28.2 (82.8)	27.5 (81.5)	26.2 (79.2)	25.1 (77.2)	24.7 (76.5)	25.3 (77.5)	26.6 (79.9)	27.6 (81.7)	28.1 (82.6)	27.0 (80.6)
Mean daily minimum °C (°F)	25.3 (77.5)	25.3 (77.5)	25.3 (77.5)	25.4 (77.7)	24.9 (76.8)	23.5 (74.3)	22.3 (72.1)	21.4 (70.5)	21.9 (71.4)	23.4 (74.1)	24.7 (76.5)	25.2 (77.4)	24.1 (75.4)
Record low °C (°F)	19.5 (67.1)	21.3 (70.3)	21.1 (70.0)	21.0 (69.8)	16.9 (62.4)	16.3 (61.3)	15.3 (59.5)	15.8 (60.4)	16.6 (61.9)	17.2 (63.0)	18.4 (65.1)	18.0 (64.4)	15.3 (59.5)
Average precipitation mm (inches)	282.7 (11.13)	221.8 (8.73)	213.4 (8.40)	95.9 (3.78)	32.2 (1.27)	19.1 (0.75)	10.6 (0.42)	10.8 (0.43)	21.4 (0.84)	41.7 (1.64)	81.9 (3.22)	170.3 (6.70)	1,201.8 (47.31)
Average precipitation days (≥ 1.0 mm)	15.1	13.8	13.7	7.2	3.8	2.9	2.0	2.0	3.0	4.3	6.4	10.5	84.7
Mean monthly sunshine hours	183.2	169.9	209.0	237.5	259.2	246.3	249.1	266.3	256.1	253.9	233.7	222.4	2,786.6
Source: Meteo France
