= Dembeni =

Commune in Mayotte, France

- Commune
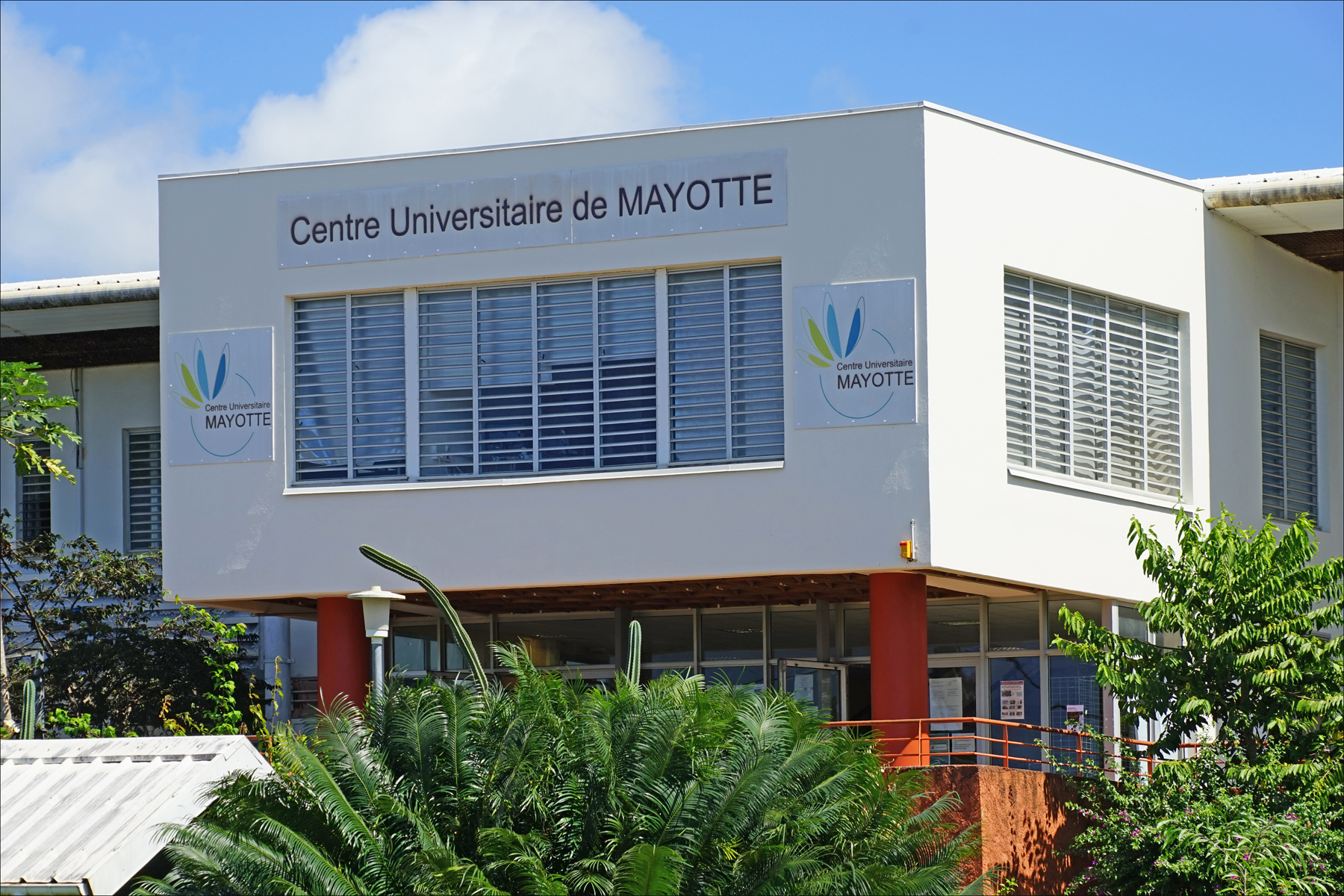
- University of Mayotte in Dembeni

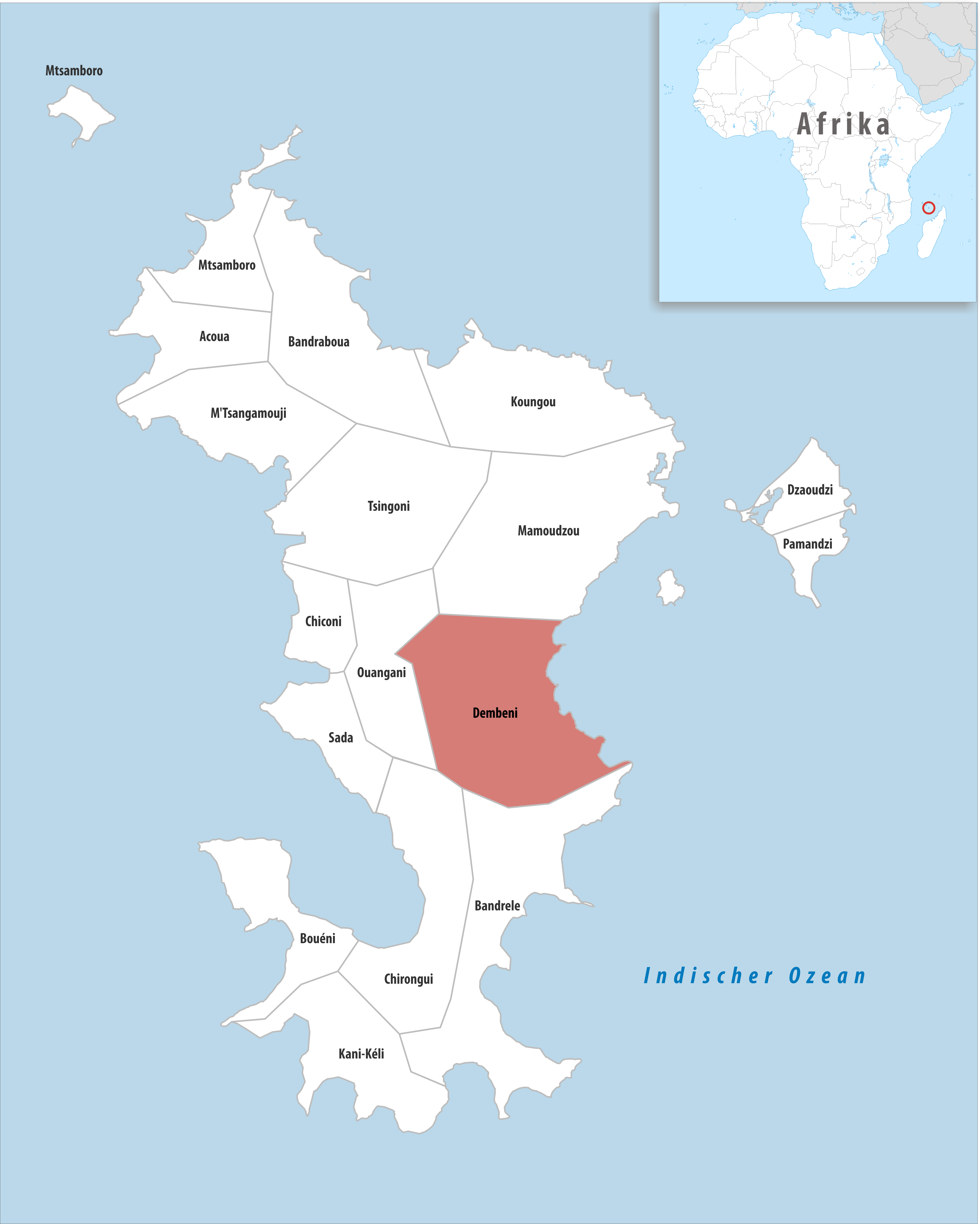
- Location of the commune (in red) within Mayotte
- Location of Dembeni
- Location within France
- Coordinates: 12°50′02″S 45°10′21″E
- Country: France
- Overseas region and department: Mayotte
- Canton: Dembeni
- Intercommunality: CA Dembeni-Mamoudzou

Government
  - Mayor (2020–2026): Moudjibou Saïdi
- Area^{1}: 38.38 km^{2} (14.82 sq mi)
- Population (2017): 15,848
  - Density: 412.9/km^{2} (1,069/sq mi)
- Time zone: UTC+03:00
- INSEE/Postal code: 97607 /97660
- ^{1} French Land Register data, which excludes lakes, ponds, glaciers > 1 km^{2} (0.386 sq mi or 247 acres) and river estuaries.

Dembeni (French pronunciation: [dɛmbeni]; also Dembéni) is a commune in the French overseas department of Mayotte, in the Indian Ocean.

== Geography ==
=== Climate ===
Dembeni has a tropical savanna climate (Köppen climate classification Aw). The average annual temperature in Dembeni is 25.9 °C (78.6 °F). The average annual rainfall is 1,525.5 mm (60.06 in) with January as the wettest month. The temperatures are highest on average in March, at around 27.7 °C (81.9 °F), and lowest in August, at around 23.6 °C (74.5 °F). The highest temperature ever recorded in Dembeni was 35.7 °C (96.3 °F) on 17 November 2011; the coldest temperature ever recorded was 13.1 °C (55.6 °F) on 4 December 2002.

Climate data for Dembeni (1991–2020 averages, extremes 1994−present)
| Month | Jan | Feb | Mar | Apr | May | Jun | Jul | Aug | Sep | Oct | Nov | Dec | Year |
|---|---|---|---|---|---|---|---|---|---|---|---|---|---|
| Record high °C (°F) | 35.0 (95.0) | 34.8 (94.6) | 35.5 (95.9) | 35.1 (95.2) | 34.1 (93.4) | 32.5 (90.5) | 32.0 (89.6) | 32.3 (90.1) | 33.5 (92.3) | 35.1 (95.2) | 35.7 (96.3) | 35.0 (95.0) | 35.7 (96.3) |
| Mean daily maximum °C (°F) | 31.6 (88.9) | 31.7 (89.1) | 32.1 (89.8) | 32.0 (89.6) | 31.1 (88.0) | 29.7 (85.5) | 29.0 (84.2) | 29.2 (84.6) | 29.7 (85.5) | 30.6 (87.1) | 31.2 (88.2) | 31.8 (89.2) | 30.8 (87.4) |
| Daily mean °C (°F) | 27.6 (81.7) | 27.6 (81.7) | 27.7 (81.9) | 27.3 (81.1) | 26.0 (78.8) | 24.5 (76.1) | 23.6 (74.5) | 23.6 (74.5) | 24.3 (75.7) | 25.4 (77.7) | 26.5 (79.7) | 27.1 (80.8) | 25.9 (78.6) |
| Mean daily minimum °C (°F) | 23.5 (74.3) | 23.6 (74.5) | 23.3 (73.9) | 22.6 (72.7) | 20.9 (69.6) | 19.3 (66.7) | 18.3 (64.9) | 18.1 (64.6) | 18.8 (65.8) | 20.2 (68.4) | 21.8 (71.2) | 22.4 (72.3) | 21.1 (70.0) |
| Record low °C (°F) | 18.1 (64.6) | 19.5 (67.1) | 18.5 (65.3) | 18.0 (64.4) | 15.0 (59.0) | 15.6 (60.1) | 13.5 (56.3) | 13.8 (56.8) | 14.5 (58.1) | 13.5 (56.3) | 16.5 (61.7) | 13.1 (55.6) | 13.1 (55.6) |
| Average precipitation mm (inches) | 346.4 (13.64) | 267.9 (10.55) | 260.2 (10.24) | 118.5 (4.67) | 37.3 (1.47) | 24.4 (0.96) | 16.3 (0.64) | 18.2 (0.72) | 26.4 (1.04) | 63.0 (2.48) | 112.5 (4.43) | 234.4 (9.23) | 1,525.5 (60.06) |
| Average precipitation days (≥ 1.0 mm) | 17.5 | 16.2 | 16.3 | 8.7 | 4.2 | 3.9 | 2.9 | 2.9 | 3.3 | 5.7 | 8.3 | 14.4 | 104.2 |
| Mean monthly sunshine hours | 166.7 | 146.8 | 181.0 | 213.6 | 240.2 | 239.2 | 241.2 | 247.6 | 219.8 | 211.8 | 206.2 | 193.6 | 2,507.6 |
Source: Meteociel (sun 1981-2010)

== Demographics ==
Demographic evolution of Dembeni

Historical population
| Year | Pop. | ±% p.a. |
|---|---|---|
| 1966 | 1,269 | — |
| 1978 | 1,518 | +1.50% |
| 1985 | 2,382 | +6.65% |
| 1991 | 3,675 | +7.49% |
| 1997 | 5,554 | +7.13% |
| 2002 | 7,825 | +7.10% |
| 2007 | 10,141 | +5.32% |
| 2012 | 10,923 | +1.50% |
| 2017 | 15,848 | +7.73% |
Source: SPLAF (1966-2007) and INSEE (2012-2017)

== Villages ==
- Ongoujou
- Tsararano
- Illoni
- Hajangua

== See also ==
- Dembeni (archeological site)
