= M'tsamoudou =

- Village
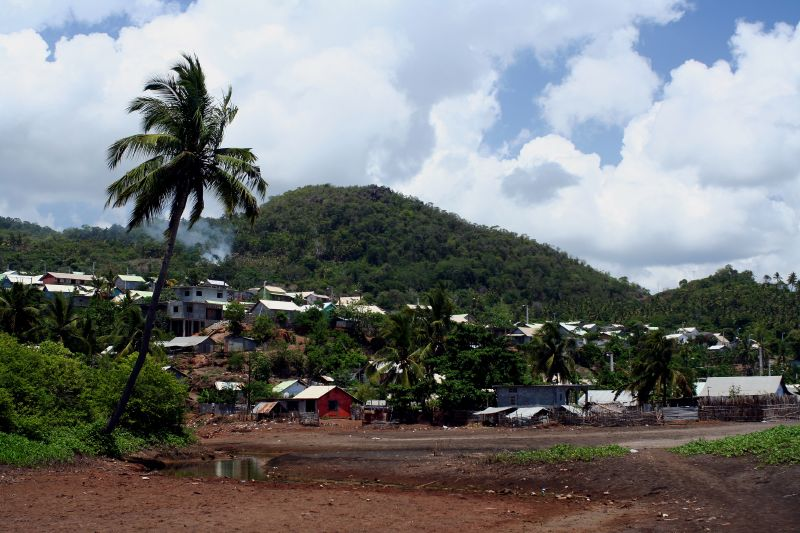
- M'tsamoudou

- Location within Mayotte
- Coordinates: 12°54′33″S 45°11′40″E
- Country: France
- Overseas Territory: Mayotte
- Commune: Bandrele

Area
  - Total: 3.646 km^{2} (1.408 sq mi)
- Postal code: 97620

M'tsamoudou is a village in the commune of Bandrele on Mayotte. It is located on the south east coast, north east of the village of Dapani. It has a notable beach. The village covers an area of 3.646 hectares.

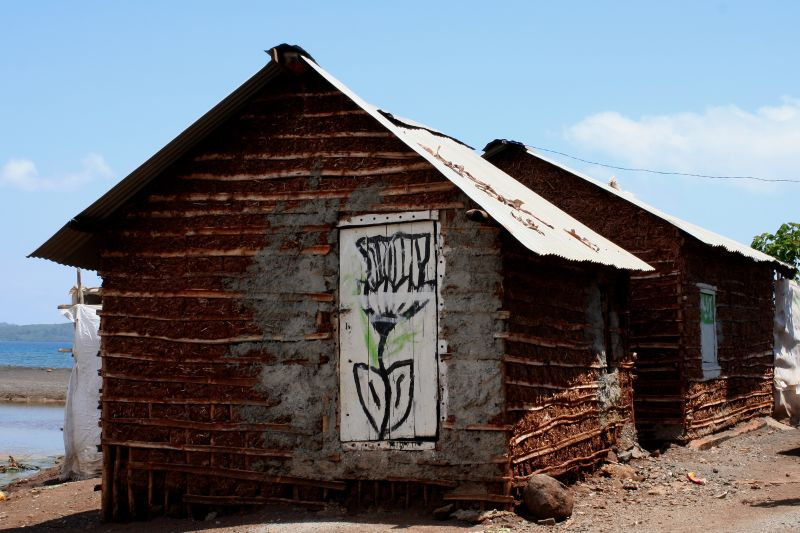
Local houses

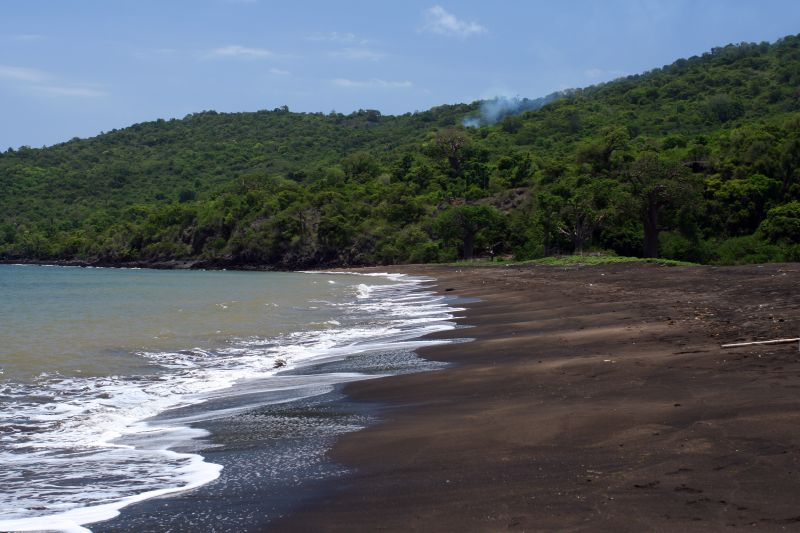
M'tsamoudou beach
