= Pointes et plages de Saziley et Charifou =

Protected area in Mayotte

- IUCN category IV (habitat/species management area)
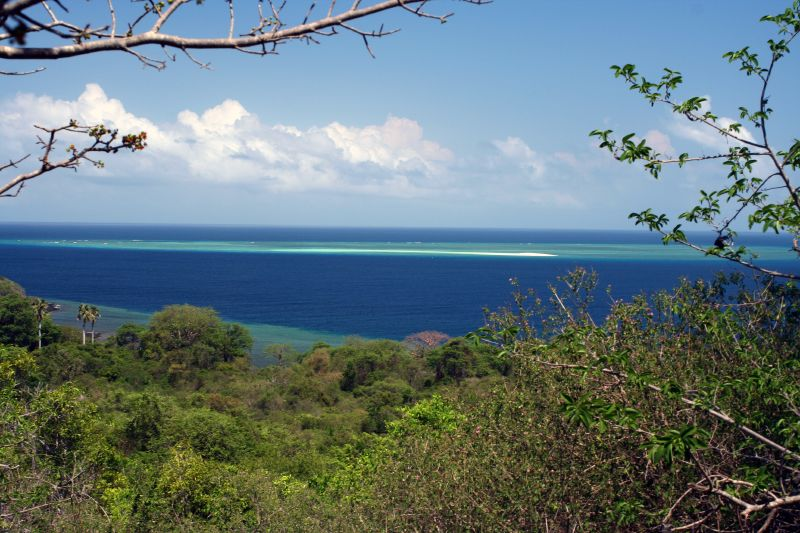
- View looking east from Point Saziley

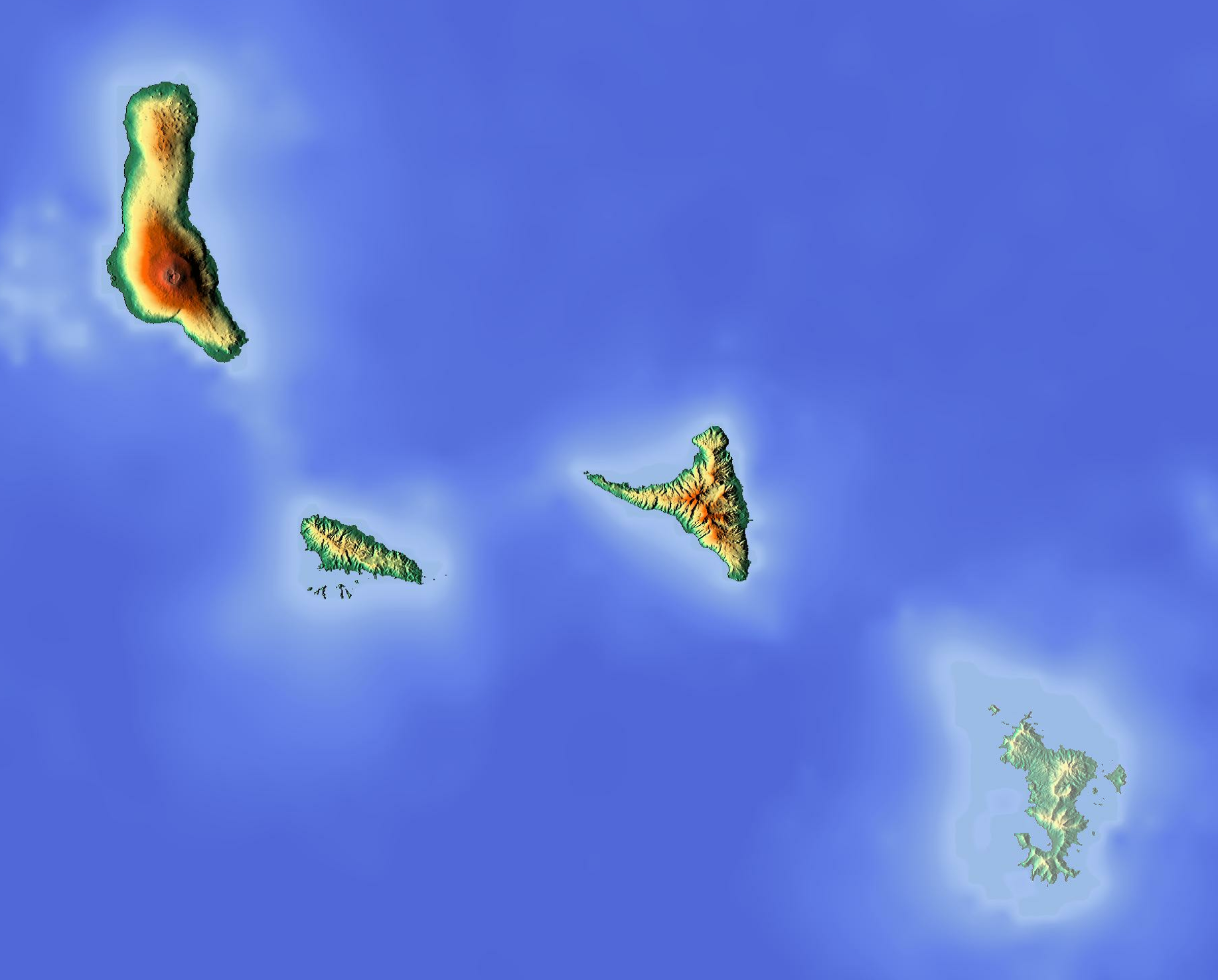
- Location within Comoros
- Location: Bandrélé, Grande-Terre, Mayotte
- Coordinates: 12°58′00″S 45°10′00″E
- Area: 665 ha (1,640 acres)
- Designation: Land Acquired By Conservatoire Du Littoral (National Seaside And Lakeside Conservancy)
- Designated: 1997
- Owner: Conservatoire Du Littoral

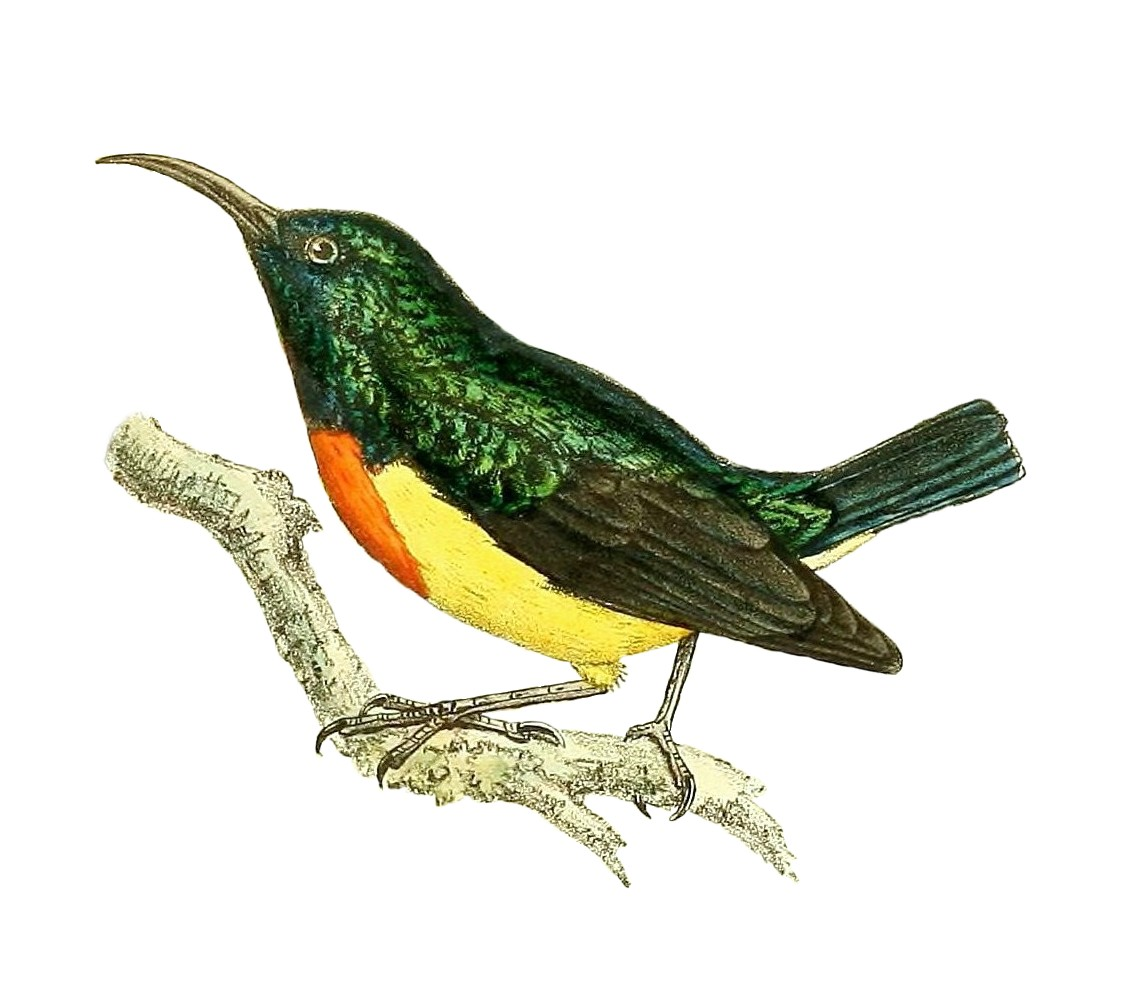
The park is an important site for Mayotte sunbirds

Pointes et plages de Saziley et Charifou (Points and beaches of Salizey and Charifou) is a protected area in Mayotte, a French island territory in the Comoro archipelago of the western Indian Ocean. It was established in 1997.

== Description ==
The protected area includes Point Saziley, the south-easternmost headland of the island, and adjacent areas. Point Saziley is 4 km long with a sharp ridge rising to 233 m and is vegetated with dry shrubland and thicket containing baobabs (Adansonia digitata). The protected area also includes the beaches and mangroves of Dapani and Charifou west of Point Salizey. The adjacent sea is part of Mayotte Marine Natural Park.

== Wildlife ==
The area supports populations of Comoros olive pigeon (Columba pollenii), Comoros blue pigeon (Alectroenas sganzini), Mayotte white-eye (Zosterops mayottensis), Mayotte sunbird (Cinnyris coquerellii) and red-headed fody (Foudia eminentissima). It is also home to Robert Mertens's day geckos (Phelsuma robertmertensi), island day geckos (Phelsuma nigristriata) and Pasteur's day geckos (Phelsuma v-nigra pasteuri). Its beaches are a nesting site for green, and probably hawksbill, sea turtles.

Together with Mont Choungui to the west, it forms the 1600 ha Mlima Choungui and Sazilé or Crêtes du Sud Important Bird Area (IBA), as identified as such by BirdLife International.
