= Dembeni (archeological site) =

Archeological site on the island of Mayotte

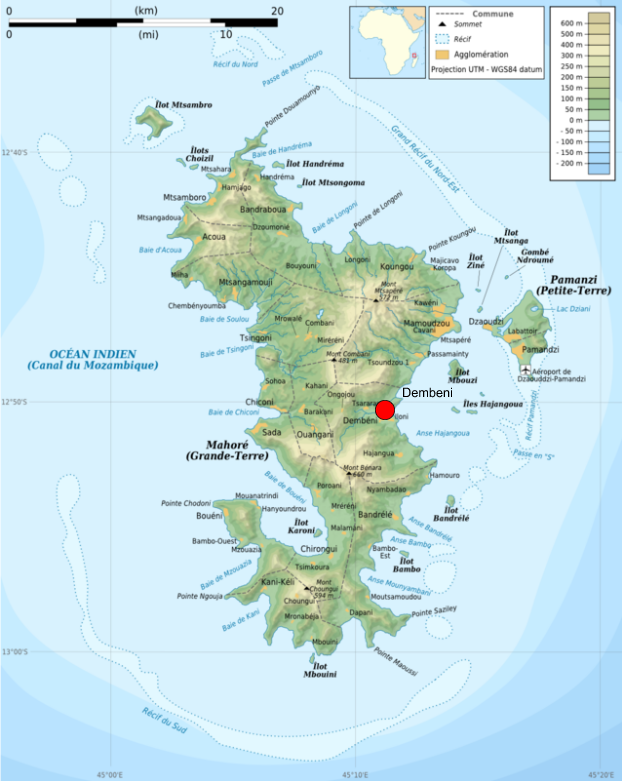
- Topographical map of Mayotte with Dembeni marked as a red dot

Dembeni is an archeological site in the Dembeni commune on the island of on Grande-Terre, Mayotte, dating from the 9th–12th centuries. Discovered by archeologists in 1975, the site represents a settlement heavily involved in the Indian Ocean trade network. Through analysis of pottery, architectural and cultural evidence, it has been determined that two distinct occupations periods occurred over its history, one dated to the 9th–10th centuries and the second to the 11th–12th centuries. A variety of ceramic artifacts from across the Indian Ocean world have been recovered from the site, indicating the settlement's participation in long-distance trade networks. Additionally, the presence of rock crystal fragments may indicate heavy participation in the Middle Eastern rock crystal trade of the 11th–12th centuries.

== Discovery ==
Dembeni was first discovered when American archeologists Susan Kus and Henry Wright uncovered pottery shards there in 1975 during an archeological survey of Mayotte. However, the site did not gain widespread notability until 1976, when a French engineer discovered large pits and gullies filled with ceramics of types undocumented by Kus & Wright.

== Topography ==
Dembeni is located on the eastern coast of the island of Mayotte, 10 kilometres (6.2 mi) south of the town of Mamoudzou. It is bordered on the north by the Mro Ironi Bé river and on the south by the Mro Dembeni River, which is the largest river on Mayotte. The archeologically studied area measures 790 by 290 metres (2,590 ft × 950 ft), totaling 21 hectares (52 acres) in area. The site faces a large bay which allows for the convenient and safe anchorage of ships.

== Chronology and structure ==
Research on the chronology of Dembeni and culturally similar sites across the Comoro archipelago (together referred to as the Dembeni Phase settlements) was first published by Wright in 1984. Two main approaches were used: serial analysis of pottery and radiometric dating. The presence of large jars with blue-green glaze over applique and opaque white glaze bowls at Dembeni and other sites suggested an occupation period later than 800 CE, and the absence of sgraffito bowls led Wright to suggest that Dembeni was abandoned sometime before 1000 CE. Sgraffito bowl production occurred during the 11th-12th centuries and were widely disseminated across the Swahili Coast, therefore the presence of these bowls can provide reliable evidence of activity at a site during that period. Wright also reported three known radiometric data points taken from Dembeni Phase settlement deposits, although none were from Dembeni itself. Two were obtained from Sima, Anjouan: a seashell that dated to 910 CE with a 96% probability of being between 785 and 1040 CE and charcoal that dated to 40 CE with a 96% probability of being between 155 BCE and 215 CE. The third date was obtained from a charcoal sample collected from M'Bachile, Grande Comore and dated to 580 CE with a 96% probability of being between 470 and 650 CE. Wright recognized that the charcoal dates fell below the time range suggested by pottery analysis and suggested that the deviant dates could be the result of the charcoal having been harvested from the inner rings of a tree.

However, new findings have since upturned what was known about Dembeni's chronology. As reported by Stéphane Pradines in 2019, sgraffito bowls have been discovered at Dembeni since Wright's research in 1984, extending Dembeni's known occupation period past 1000 CE. Additionally, stratigraphical analysis of the settlement's architectural organization by Pradines supports an occupation period spanning the 8th-12th centuries, corroborating the dates obtained from pottery analysis. Based on this analysis, Dembeni's archeological history can be split into two distinct occupation phases, the first dated to the 9th-10th centuries and the second to the 11th-12th centuries. The first phase occupied the center of the plateau and is characterized by the presence of postholes, long ovoid pits, burnt fragments of wattle and the use of uncut Porites coral in the construction of mud-and-thatch walls. Use of Porites in this manner is associated with Swahili Coast settlements dating to the 10th-11th centuries. The second occupation phase is characterized by the conversion of the central plateau into a cemetery with residential areas on the eastern and western sides, as well as the usage of cut coral blocks in construction. In 2015, two graves were excavated that contained skeletons buried facing Mecca, suggesting that Islam was already present in Dembeni during this period. Muslim graves begin to become common in Mayotte during the 11th-12th centuries, supporting the dating of this occupation phase of Dembeni. In line with these dates, the use of cut coral blocks (rather than uncut as in the first occupation phase) is associated with Swahili settlements during the same time period. Additionally, pottery recovered from the middens associated with the residential areas of the second occupation phase are consistent with a period spanning the 11th-12th centuries, after which Dembeni presumably was abandoned.

== Ceramics ==
Pottery makes up a large and important part of Dembeni's archeological record. Approximately 85% of ceramics uncovered at the site belong to the so-called "Mawuti pottery", a pottery culture that is thought to be of local origin. Mawuti pottery is characterized by a rough paste, brown to greyish-brown color and decorative features such as zigzags, punctures and seashell impressions. The remaining 15% of recovered ceramics represent trade imports from throughout the Indian Ocean world, including Iran, Iraq, China, Madagascar and India.

== Rock crystal trade ==
Rock crystal is a transparent variety of hyaline quartz that was coveted throughout the Muslim world for its aesthetic appeal as well as its supposed magical properties, and therefore was a valuable trade item. Rock crystal fragments and blocks have been found throughout Dembeni, indicating the settlement was participating in the lucrative crystal trade. These rock crystals appear to have originated in Madagascar, from where they were shipped to Dembeni and then on to the Middle East. The height of the rock crystal trade was under the Abbasid and Fatimid caliphates, which existed between the 9th and 12th centuries. This time period maps closely to the occupation period of Dembeni, leading some to suggest that the crystal trade with these caliphates generated the majority of Dembeni's wealth.
