= Hamouro =

- Village
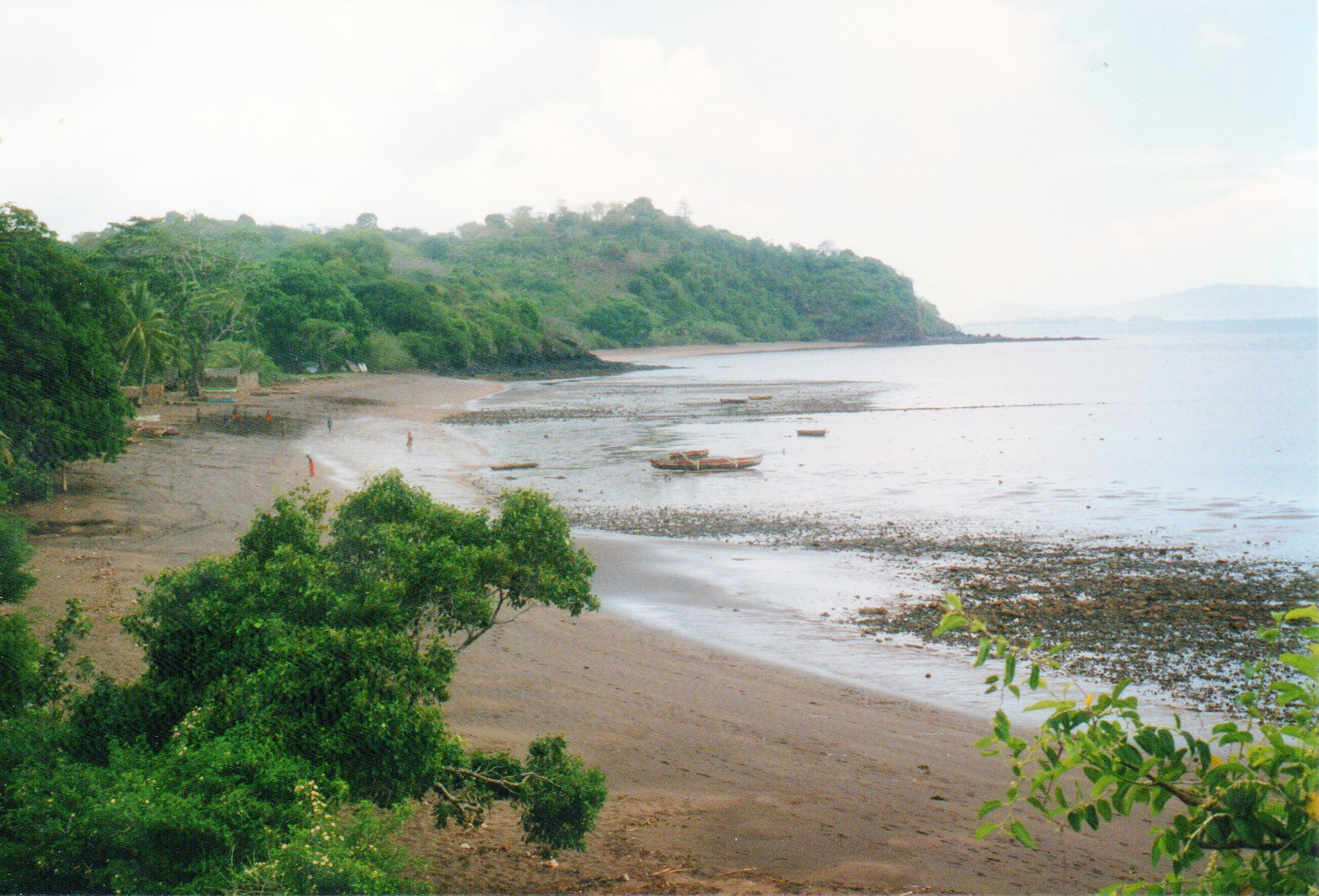
- The beach at Hamouro

- Location within Mayotte
- Coordinates: 12°52′54″S 45°12′53″E
- Country: France
- Overseas Territory: Mayotte
- Commune: Bandrele
- Time zone: UTC+3 (EAT)

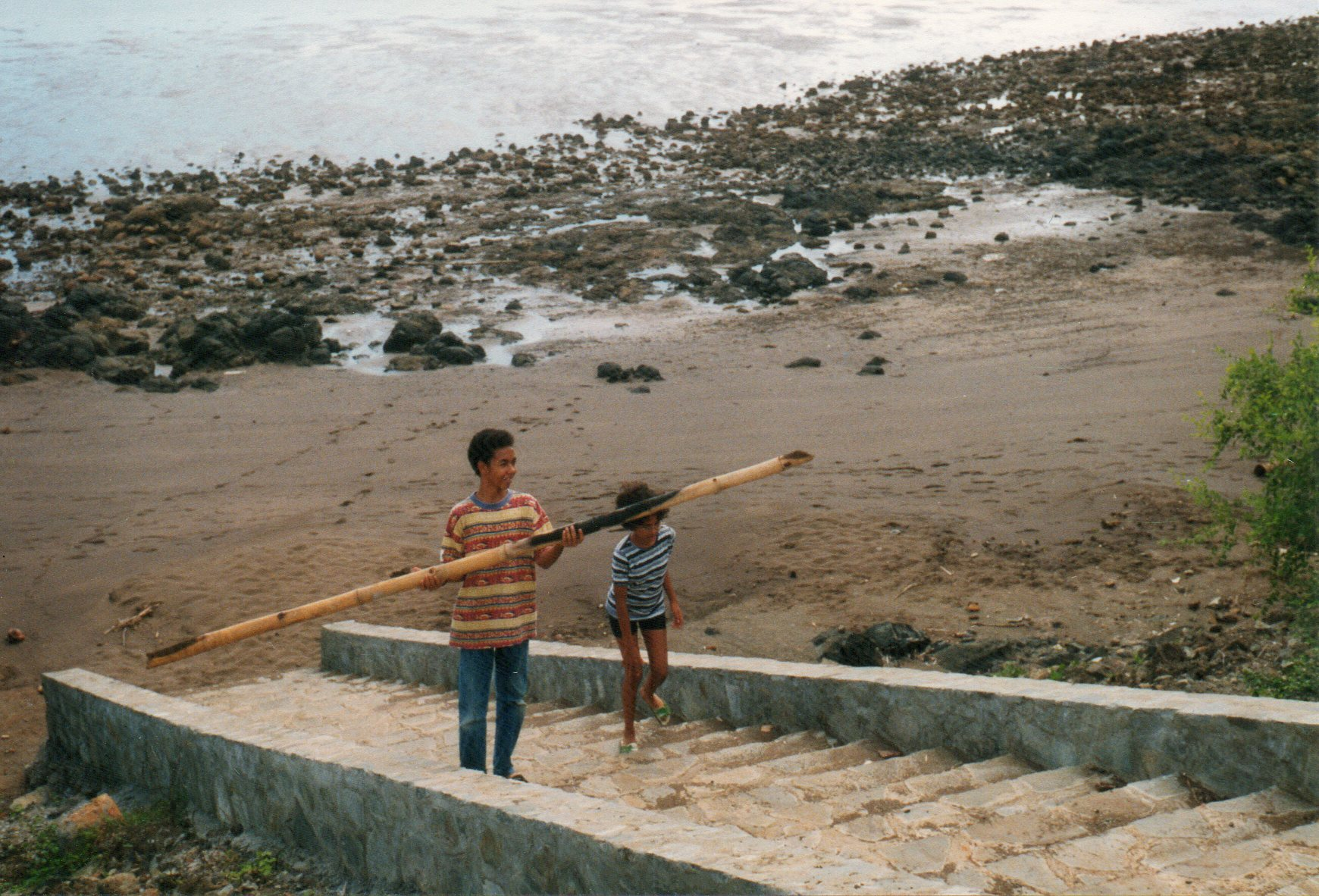
Local children

Hamouro is a village in the commune of Bandrele on Mayotte, France.

== Geography ==
Hamouro lies on the east coast of Mayotte, 5 kilometres (3.1 mi) by road north of Bandrele, southeast of the village of Hajangou and northeast of Nyambadaoa. Beaches in the area include the Plage du Phare, which lies just to the northeast of the village, and Plage de Sakouli, just to the southwest.

== Economy and utilities ==
Hamouro has a small covered market, which lies along the main road (the N3 road) in the village.

The commune of Bandrélé has been actively working towards improving housing, sanitation, local commerce and the safety of local roads in the area since 2014. The French National Institute of statistics and economic studies described Hamouro as a village with "very disadvantaged living conditions". In May 2018, working in conjunction with GRET and Gescod, they set about improving sanitation in the area.

In mid August 2023, 81 illegally constructed corrugated iron shacks in the village were bulldozed to the ground on the first day of a new operation in Hamouro to improve local conditions.
