= Dapani =

- Village
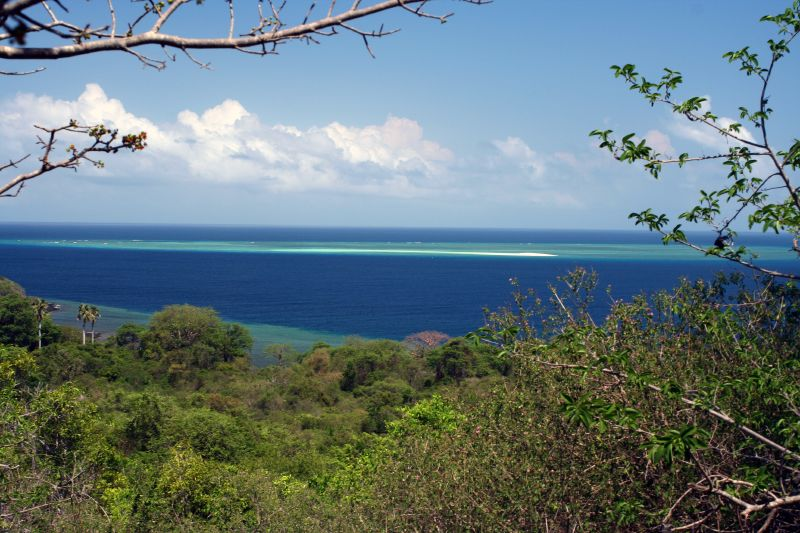
- Saziley Point, east of Dapani

- Location within Mayotte
- Coordinates: 12°58′17″S 45°9′39″E
- Country: France
- Overseas Territory: Mayotte
- Commune: Bandrele

Area
  - Total: 3.646 km^{2} (1.408 sq mi)
- Postal code: 97620

Dapani is a village in the commune of Bandrele on Mayotte. It is located near the Pointes et plages de Saziley et Charifou protected area on the south-east of Mayotte. The protected area includes Dapani Beach and mangroves, and is a notable bird habitat known for its "botanical trail" through the mangroves.

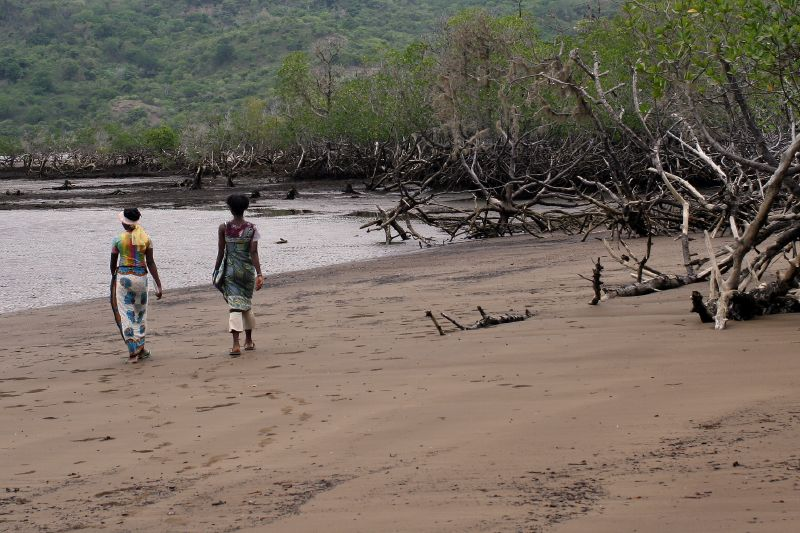
Two locals on the beach in Dapani
