= Nyambadao =

Village in the French overseas department of Mayotte

- Village
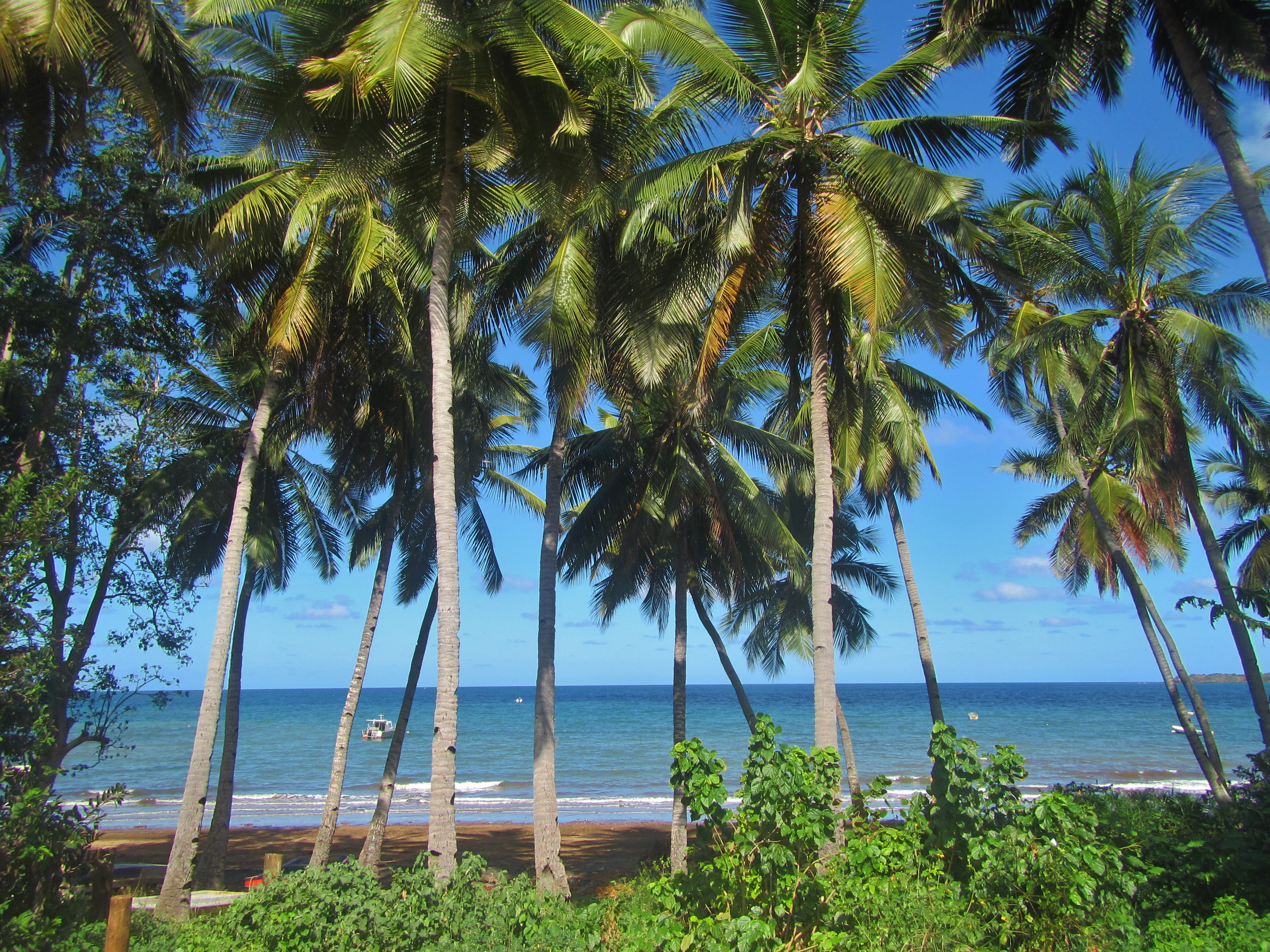
- Nyambadao beach

- Location within Mayotte
- Coordinates: 12°53′37″S 45°12′8″E
- Country: France
- Department: Mayotte
- Commune: Bandrele
- Time zone: UTC+3:00 (Mayotte Time)

Nyambadao is a village in the commune of Bandrele on Mayotte.
