= Bandrélé =

Commune in Mayotte, France

Bandrele
- Commune
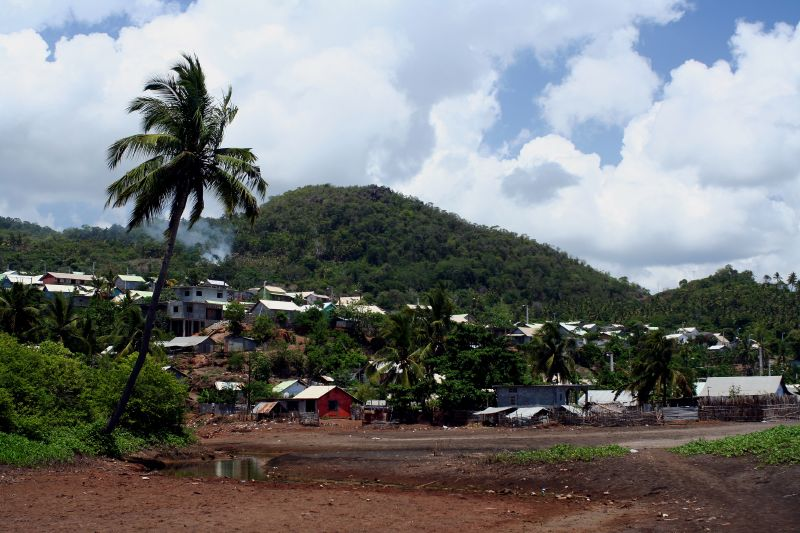
- Mtsamoudou village, Bandrélé commune

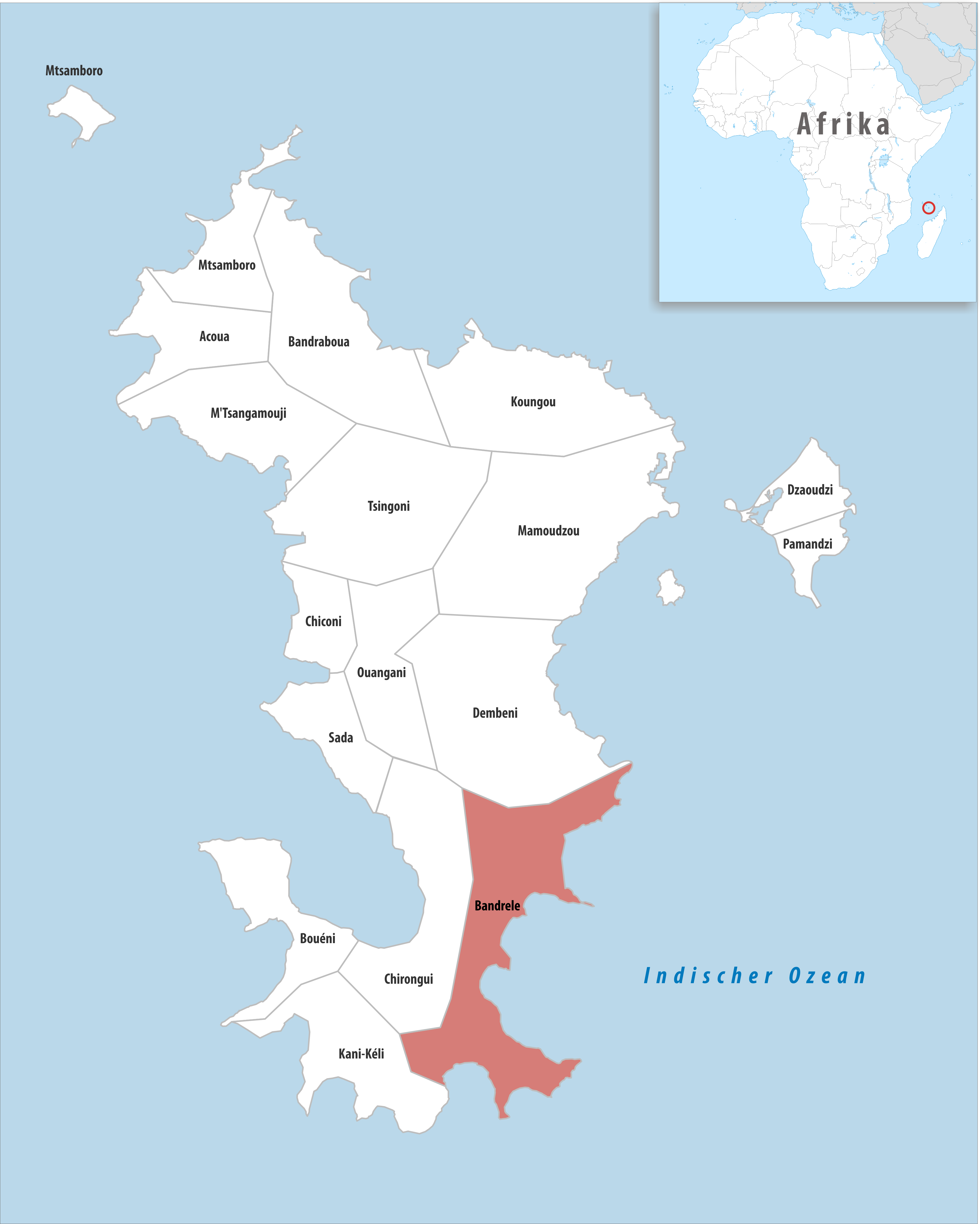
- Location of the commune (in red) within Mayotte
- Location of Bandrele
- Location within France
- Coordinates: 12°54′33″S 45°11′40″E
- Country: France
- Overseas region and department: Mayotte
- Canton: Bouéni and Dembeni

Government
  - Mayor (2020–2026): Ali Moussa Moussa Ben
- Area^{1}: 36.56 km^{2} (14.12 sq mi)
- Highest elevation: 297 m (974 ft)
- Lowest elevation: 0 m (0 ft)
- Population (2017): 10,282
  - Density: 281.2/km^{2} (728.4/sq mi)
- Time zone: UTC+03:00
- INSEE/Postal code: 97603 /97660
- ^{1} French Land Register data, which excludes lakes, ponds, glaciers > 1 km^{2} (0.386 sq mi or 247 acres) and river estuaries.

Bandrele (French pronunciation: [bɑ̃dʁele]; sometimes spelled Bandrélé) is a commune in the French overseas department of Mayotte, in the Indian Ocean.

== Geography ==
=== Climate ===
Bandrélé has a tropical savanna climate (Köppen climate classification Aw). The average annual temperature in Bandrélé is 26.7 °C (80.1 °F). The average annual rainfall is 1,277.3 mm (50.29 in) with January as the wettest month. The temperatures are highest on average in March, at around 28.0 °C (82.4 °F), and lowest in August, at around 24.6 °C (76.3 °F). The highest temperature ever recorded in Bandrélé was 34.2 °C (93.6 °F) on 20 November 2006; the coldest temperature ever recorded was 17.3 °C (63.1 °F) on 29 August 2012.

Climate data for Bandrélé (1991−2020 normals, extremes 2004−)
Month	Jan	Feb	Mar	Apr	May	Jun	Jul	Aug	Sep	Oct	Nov	Dec	Year
Record high °C (°F)	33.9 (93.0)	33.7 (92.7)	34.1 (93.4)	33.9 (93.0)	33.3 (91.9)	31.3 (88.3)	30.3 (86.5)	30.3 (86.5)	32.9 (91.2)	32.5 (90.5)	34.2 (93.6)	33.5 (92.3)	34.2 (93.6)
Mean daily maximum °C (°F)	31.0 (87.8)	31.0 (87.8)	31.3 (88.3)	31.2 (88.2)	30.3 (86.5)	29.2 (84.6)	28.5 (83.3)	28.6 (83.5)	29.3 (84.7)	30.1 (86.2)	30.6 (87.1)	30.9 (87.6)	30.2 (86.4)
Daily mean °C (°F)	27.9 (82.2)	27.9 (82.2)	28.0 (82.4)	27.9 (82.2)	26.8 (80.2)	25.6 (78.1)	24.8 (76.6)	24.6 (76.3)	25.3 (77.5)	26.4 (79.5)	27.3 (81.1)	27.6 (81.7)	26.7 (80.1)
Mean daily minimum °C (°F)	24.8 (76.6)	24.9 (76.8)	24.7 (76.5)	24.5 (76.1)	23.4 (74.1)	22.1 (71.8)	21.1 (70.0)	20.7 (69.3)	21.4 (70.5)	22.7 (72.9)	24.0 (75.2)	24.3 (75.7)	23.2 (73.8)
Record low °C (°F)	22.2 (72.0)	22.8 (73.0)	22.3 (72.1)	21.4 (70.5)	19.5 (67.1)	17.4 (63.3)	17.6 (63.7)	17.3 (63.1)	18.3 (64.9)	19.1 (66.4)	19.7 (67.5)	22.1 (71.8)	17.3 (63.1)
Average precipitation mm (inches)	292.8 (11.53)	245.5 (9.67)	202.3 (7.96)	103.8 (4.09)	34.0 (1.34)	23.0 (0.91)	16.7 (0.66)	12.4 (0.49)	17.0 (0.67)	46.9 (1.85)	84.8 (3.34)	198.1 (7.80)	1,277.3 (50.29)
Average precipitation days (≥ 1.0 mm)	16.1	15.3	14.4	8.6	4.9	3.8	3.0	2.4	3.0	5.7	7.4	12.7	97.3
Source: Météo-France

== Villages ==
- Dapani
- Mtsamoudou
- Bambo Est
- Nyambadao
- Hamouro
- Sakouli

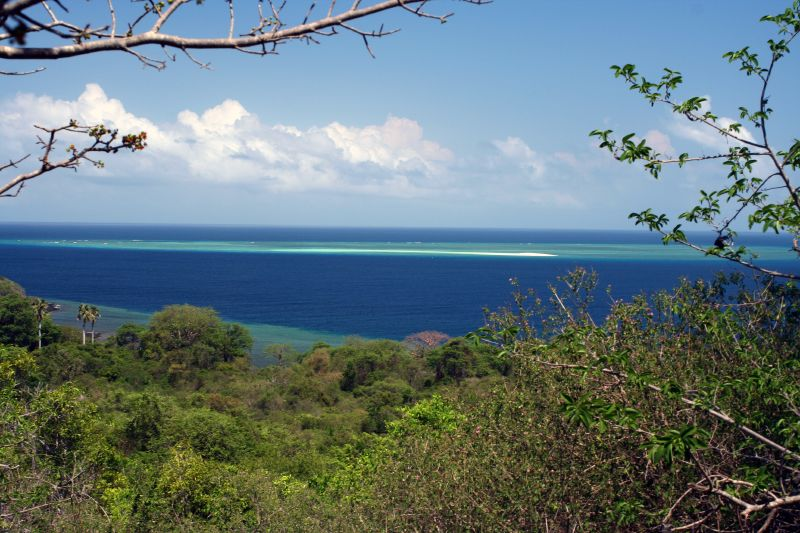
Îlot-Sable-Blanc-pointe-Saziley
