= Ongoujou =

Human settlement in Anjouan, Comoros

Coordinates: 12°18′42″S 44°30′29″E

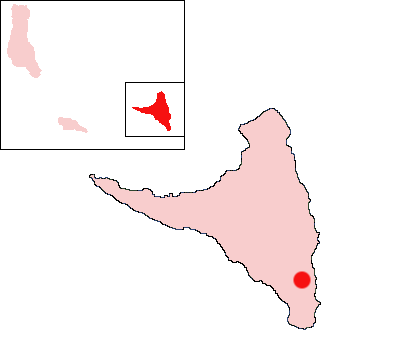
Location of Ongoujou on the island of Anjouan

Ongoujou (population 11,500) is a town located on the island of Anjouan in the Comoros.
