= Africa =

Continent

- Area: 30,370,000 km^{2} (11,730,000 sq mi) (2nd)
- Population: ▲1,393,676,444 (2021; 2nd)
- Population density: 46.1/km^{2} (119.4/sq mi) (2021)
- GDP (PPP): $10.77 trillion (2025 est; 4th)
- GDP (nominal): $2.82 trillion (2025 est; 5th)
- GDP per capita: $1,920 (Nominal; 2025 est; 6th)
- Religions: Christianity (49%); Islam (42%); Traditional faiths (8%); Others (1%)
- Demonym: African
- Countries: 54 recognised states, 2 partially recognised states, 4 dependent territories
- Dependencies: External (4): Bouvet Island, Norway; French Southern Territories; Heard Island and McDonald Islands; Saint Helena, Ascension and Tristan da Cunha; Internal (3+1 disputed): Mayotte and Réunion, France; Southern Provinces, Morocco; Zanzibar, Tanzania; Socotra, Yemen
- Languages: 1250–3000 native languages
- Time zone: UTC-1 to UTC+4
- Largest cities: Largest urban areas: Cairo; Lagos; Kinshasa; Johannesburg; Luanda; Khartoum; Accra; Durban; Dar es Salaam; Abidjan; Alexandria; Kigali; Nairobi; Algiers; Cape Town; Kano; Dakar; Casablanca; Addis Ababa; Kampala; Bamako
- A: African people often combine the practice of their traditional beliefs with the practice of Abrahamic religions.

Africa is the world's second-largest and second-most populous continent after Asia. At about 30.3 million km^{2} (11.7 million square miles), including adjacent islands, it covers around 20% of Earth's land area and 6% of its total surface area. With nearly 1.4 billion of the world's population, Africa's population is the youngest among the continents; the median age in 2012 was 19.7, when the worldwide median age was 30.4. Based on 2024 projections, Africa's population will exceed 3.8 billion people by 2100. Africa is the least wealthy inhabited continent per capita and second-least wealthy by total wealth, ahead of Oceania. Scholars have attributed this to various factors including geography, climate, corruption, colonialism, the Cold War, and neocolonialism. Despite this low concentration of wealth, the African economy is home to many of the world's fastest-growing economies.

Africa straddles the equator and the prime meridian. The continent is surrounded by the Mediterranean Sea to the north, the Arabian plate and the Gulf of Suez to the northeast, the Indian Ocean to the southeast and the Atlantic Ocean to the west. France, Italy, Portugal, Spain, and Yemen have parts of their territories located on African geographical soil, mostly in the form of islands.

The continent includes Madagascar and various archipelagos. It contains 54 fully recognised sovereign states, eight cities and islands that are part of non-African states, and two de facto independent states with limited or no recognition. This count does not include Malta and Sicily, which are geologically part of the African continent. Algeria is the largest country by area, and Nigeria is the largest by population. Nations cooperate through the establishment of the African Union, which is headquartered in Addis Ababa.

Africa is highly biodiverse; it is the continent with the largest number of megafauna species, as it was least affected by the extinction of the Pleistocene megafauna. However, it is heavily affected by a wide range of environmental issues, including desertification, deforestation, water scarcity, and pollution. These entrenched environmental concerns are expected to worsen as climate change impacts Africa. The UN Intergovernmental Panel on Climate Change has identified Africa as the continent most vulnerable to climate change.

The history of Africa is long, complex, and varied, and has often been under-appreciated by the global historical community. In African societies, the oral word is revered, and they have generally recorded their history via oral tradition, which has led anthropologists to term them "oral civilisations", contrasted with "literate civilisations" which pride the written word. (Note: This characterisation has come under criticism by some African scholars, as it implies conflict between the oral and written. They instead contend that in reality, the characterisation is defined by the interaction between three ways of expression and diffusion: the oral, the written, and the printed word. Bethwell Allan Ogot notes that images of Africa composed by Western writers have often been in terms of "opposites" and how they differ from "us".) African culture is rich and diverse both within and across regions, encompassing art, cuisine, music and dance, religion, and dress.

Africa, particularly Eastern Africa, is widely accepted to be the place of origin of humans and the Hominidae clade, also known as the great apes. The earliest hominids and their ancestors have been dated to around 7 million years ago, and Homo sapiens (modern humans) are believed to have originated in Africa 350,000 to 260,000 years ago. (Note: Attributed to multiple sources:) Throughout history, the continent saw the rise and fall of many kingdoms and empires, such as Ancient Egypt, Makuria, the Fatimids, Mali, the Asante, Kongo, the Luba, Bunyoro, Great Zimbabwe, Imerina, and the Zulu. Despite the predominance of states, many societies were heterarchical and stateless. (Note: In stateless societies, oral histories centred around clan histories. John Lonsdale famously said that "the most distinctively African contribution to human history could be said to have been precisely the civilized art of living fairly peaceably together not in states".) Slave trades created various diasporas, especially in the Americas. From the late 19th century to the early 20th century, driven by the Second Industrial Revolution, most of Africa was rapidly conquered and colonised by European nations, save for Ethiopia and Liberia. European rule had significant impacts on Africa's societies, and colonies were maintained for the purpose of economic exploitation and extraction of natural resources. Most present states emerged from a process of decolonisation following World War II and established the Organisation of African Unity in 1963, the predecessor to the African Union. The nascent countries decided to keep their colonial borders, with traditional power structures used in governance to varying degrees.

== Etymology ==
Equal Earth projection map of Africa, 2018

Afri was a Latin name used to refer to the inhabitants of what was then known as northern Africa, located west of the River Nile, and in its widest sense referring to all lands south of the Mediterranean, also known as Ancient Libya. This name seems to have originally referred to a native Libyan (Berber) tribe; see Terence for discussion. In numitheism and ancient Roman religion, Africa was a goddess of fertility and abundance worshipped by the Berbers and the tribe of Ifri. It stems from the Berber word ifri (plural ifran), meaning "cave", in reference to cave worship. The same word may be found in the name of the Banu Ifran from Algeria and Tripolitania, a Berber tribe originally from Yafran (also known as Ifrane) in northwestern Libya, as well as Ifrane, Morocco. The name has also been connected with the Phoenician word ʿafar meaning "dust".

Under Roman rule, Carthage became the capital of the province of Africa Proconsularis, following the Roman victory over the Carthaginians in the Third Punic War in 146 BC, which also included the coastal part of modern Libya. The Latin suffix -ica can sometimes be used to denote a land (e.g., in Celtica from Celtae, as used by Julius Caesar). The medieval Muslim region of Ifriqiya, following its conquest of the Byzantine (Eastern Roman) Empire's Exarchatus Africae, preserved a form of the name. According to the Romans, Africa lies to the west of Egypt, while "Asia" was used to refer to Anatolia and lands to the east. In his Geographia, Ptolemy draws a definite line between the two continents by indicating Alexandria along the prime meridian and making the Isthmus of Suez and the Red Sea the boundary between Asia and Africa. As Europeans came to understand the real extent of the continent, the idea of "Africa" expanded with their knowledge.

Other etymological hypotheses have been postulated:

- 1st-century Jewish historian Flavius Josephus (Ant. 1.15) asserted that it was named for Epher, grandson of Abraham according to Genesis 25:4, whose descendants, he claimed, had invaded Libya.
- Isidore of Seville, in his 7th-century Etymologiae XIV.5.2., suggests it comes from the Latin aprica, meaning "sunny".
- Massey, in 1881, stated it is derived from the Egyptian af-rui-ka, meaning "to turn toward the opening of the Ka". The ka is the energetic double of every person, and the "opening of the Ka" refers to a womb or birthplace. Africa would be, for the Egyptians, "the birthplace".
- Michèle Fruyt in 1976 proposed linking the Latin word with africus "south wind", which would be of Umbrian origin and mean originally "rainy wind".
- Robert R. Stieglitz of Rutgers University in 1984 proposed: "The name Africa, derived from the Latin *Aphir-ic-a, is cognate to Hebrew Ophir ['rich']."
- Ibn Khallikan and some other historians claim the name came from a Himyarite king called Afrikin ibn Kais ibn Saifi ("Afrikus son of Abraham") who subdued Ifriqiya.
- Arabic afrīqā (feminine noun) and ifrīqiyā, now usually pronounced afrīqiyā (feminine) 'Africa', from 'afara [' = 'ain, not 'alif] 'to be dusty' from 'afar 'dust, powder' and 'afir 'dried, dried up by the sun, withered' and 'affara 'to dry in the sun on hot sand' or 'to sprinkle with dust'.
- Possibly Phoenician faraqa in the sense of 'colony, separation'.

The terms "North Africa" and "Sub-Saharan Africa" have been subject to recent criticism from some scholars due to their historical root in colonialist discourse which arbitrarily separated Africa into a white "northern" Africa and black "southern" Africa, overlooking common genetic links and regional diversity across the continent.

== History ==
In accordance with African cosmology, African historical consciousness viewed historical change and continuity, order and purpose within the framework of man and his environment, the gods, and his ancestors; he believed himself part of a holistic spiritual entity. In African societies, the historical process is largely a communal one, with eyewitness accounts, hearsay, reminiscences, and occasionally visions, dreams, and hallucinations crafted into narrative oral traditions which are performed and transmitted through generations.

In oral traditions, time is sometimes mythical and social, and ancestors were considered historical actors. (Note: In these cases, time's duration is not as it affects the fate of the individual, but the pulse of the social group. It is not a river flowing in one direction from a known source to a known outlet. Generally, traditional African time involves eternity in both directions, unlike Christians who consider eternity to operate in one direction. In African animism, time is an arena where both the group and the individual struggle for their vitality. The goal is to improve their situation, thus being dynamic. Bygone generations remain contemporary, and as influential as they were during their lifetime, if not more so. In these circumstances, causality operates in a forward direction from past to present and from present to future; however, direct intervention can operate in any direction.) Mind and memory shape traditions, as events are condensed over time and crystallise into clichés.Oral tradition can be exoteric or esoteric. It speaks to people according to their understanding, unveiling itself in accordance with their aptitudes. In African epistemology, the epistemic subject "experiences the epistemic object in a sensuous, emotive, intuitive, abstractive understanding, rather than through abstraction alone, as is the case in Western epistemology" to arrive at a "complete knowledge", and as such oral traditions, music, proverbs, and the like were used in the preservation and transmission of knowledge.

=== Prehistory ===
Africa is considered by most paleoanthropologists to be the oldest inhabited territory on Earth, with the Human species originating from the continent. During the mid-20th century, anthropologists discovered many fossils and evidence of human occupation perhaps as early as seven million years ago ("Before Present"; BP). Fossil remains of several species of early apelike humans thought to have evolved into modern humans, such as Australopithecus afarensis radiometrically dated to approximately 3.9–3.0 million BP, Paranthropus boisei (c. 2.3–1.4 million BP) and Homo ergaster (c. 1.9 million–600,000 BP) have been discovered.

Successive dispersals of Homo erectus (yellow), Homo neanderthalensis (ochre) during Out of Africa I and Homo sapiens (red, Out of Africa II), with the numbers of years since they appeared before present.

After the evolution of Homo sapiens approximately 350,000 to 260,000 BP, the continent was mainly populated by groups of hunter-gatherers. These first modern humans left Africa and populated the rest of the globe during the Out of Africa II migration dated to approximately 50,000 years BP, exiting either across Bab-el-Mandeb over the Red Sea, the Strait of Gibraltar, or the Isthmus of Suez.

Other migrations of modern humans have been dated to that time, with evidence of early human settlement found in southern Africa, Southeast Africa, North Africa, and the Sahara. During the African humid period, estimated to have been around 10,500 BP, the Sahara had again become a green fertile valley, and its populations returned from the interior and coastal highlands, with rock art paintings depicting a fertile Sahara and large populations discovered in Tassili n'Ajjer dating back perhaps 10 millennia. However, the warming and drying climate meant that by 5,000 BP, the Sahara region was becoming increasingly dry and hostile. Around 3500 BC, due to a tilt in Earth's orbit, the Sahara experienced a period of rapid desertification. The domestication of cattle preceded agriculture and seems to have existed alongside hunter-gatherer cultures. It is speculated that by 6,000 BP, cattle were domesticated in North Africa.

In West Africa, a wet phase ushered in an expanding rainforest and wooded savanna from Senegal to Cameroon. Between 9,000 and 5,000 BP, Niger–Congo speakers domesticated the oil palm and raffia palm. Black-eyed peas and voandzeia (African groundnuts) were domesticated, followed by okra and kola nuts. Since most of the plants grew in the forest, the Niger–Congo speakers invented polished stone axes for clearing forest. Pygmies are thought to have inhabited Central Africa for many millennia, splitting into eastern and western groups around 5,000 BP. Over 150,000 BP, there was an early dispersal of anatomically modern humans to Southern Africa, equated with the modern-day Khoisan who have preserved their traditional hunter-gatherer way of life. (Note: Some scholars contest that cultures and identities cannot be considered fixed or invariable, especially over such a long time period.)

=== 4th millennium BC – 6th century AD ===
==== Northeast Africa ====
Map of Ancient Egypt, showing its major cities and sites, c. 3150 BC to 30 BC

From 3500 BC, nomes (ruled by nomarchs) coalesced to form the kingdoms of Lower Egypt and Upper Egypt in northeast Africa. Around 3100 BC, Upper Egypt conquered Lower Egypt to unify Egypt under the 1st dynasty, with the process of consolidation and assimilation completed by the time of the 3rd dynasty, which formed the Old Kingdom of Egypt in 2686 BC. The Kingdom of Kerma emerged around this time to become the dominant force in Nubia, controlling territory as large as Egypt between the first and fourth cataracts of the Nile.

The height of the Old Kingdom saw the construction of many great pyramids, though under the 6th dynasty power gradually decentralised to the nomarchs, culminating in the disintegration of the kingdom, exacerbated by drought and famine. Around 2055 BC, the 11th dynasty, based in Thebes, conquered the others to form the Middle Kingdom of Egypt, and the 12th dynasty expanded into Lower Nubia at the expense of Kerma. Around 1700 BC, the Middle Kingdom fractured in two, and the Hyksos (a militaristic people from Palestine) invaded and conquered Lower Egypt, while Kerma coordinated invasions deep into Egypt to reach its greatest extent. In 1550 BC, the 18th dynasty expelled the Hyksos and established the New Kingdom of Egypt. The New Kingdom conquered the Levant from the Canaanites, Mittani, Amorites, and Hittites, and extinguished Kerma, incorporating Nubia into the empire, and sending the Egyptian empire into its golden age. Internal struggles, drought, famine, and invasions by a confederation of seafaring peoples contributed to the New Kingdom's collapse in 1069 BC.

The New Kingdom's collapse liberated the Kingdom of Kush in Nubia, which manoeuvred into power in Upper Egypt and conquered Lower Egypt in 754 BC to form the Kushite Empire. The Kushites ruled for a century and oversaw a revival in pyramid building, until they were driven out of Egypt by the Assyrians in 663 BC in reprisal for their expansion towards the Assyrian Empire. The Assyrians installed a puppet dynasty that later gained independence and once more unified Egypt, until it was conquered by the Achaemenid Empire in 525 BC.

Egypt briefly regained independence from the Achaemenids under the 28th dynasty from 404 to 343 BC. The conquest of Achaemenid Egypt by Alexander the Great in 332 BC marked the beginning of Hellenistic rule and the installation of the Macedonian Ptolemaic dynasty. The Ptolemaics lost their holdings outside of Africa to the Seleucids in the Syrian Wars, expanded into Cyrenaica, and briefly occupied part of Kush in the 3rd century BC. In the 1st century BC, Ptolemaic Egypt became entangled in a Roman civil war, leading to its conquest by the Romans in 30 BC. Kush persisted as a major regional power until, having been weakened by internal rebellion amid worsening climatic conditions, invasions by Aksum and the Noba caused its disintegration into Makuria, Alodia, and Nobatia around the 5th century AD.

==== Horn of Africa ====
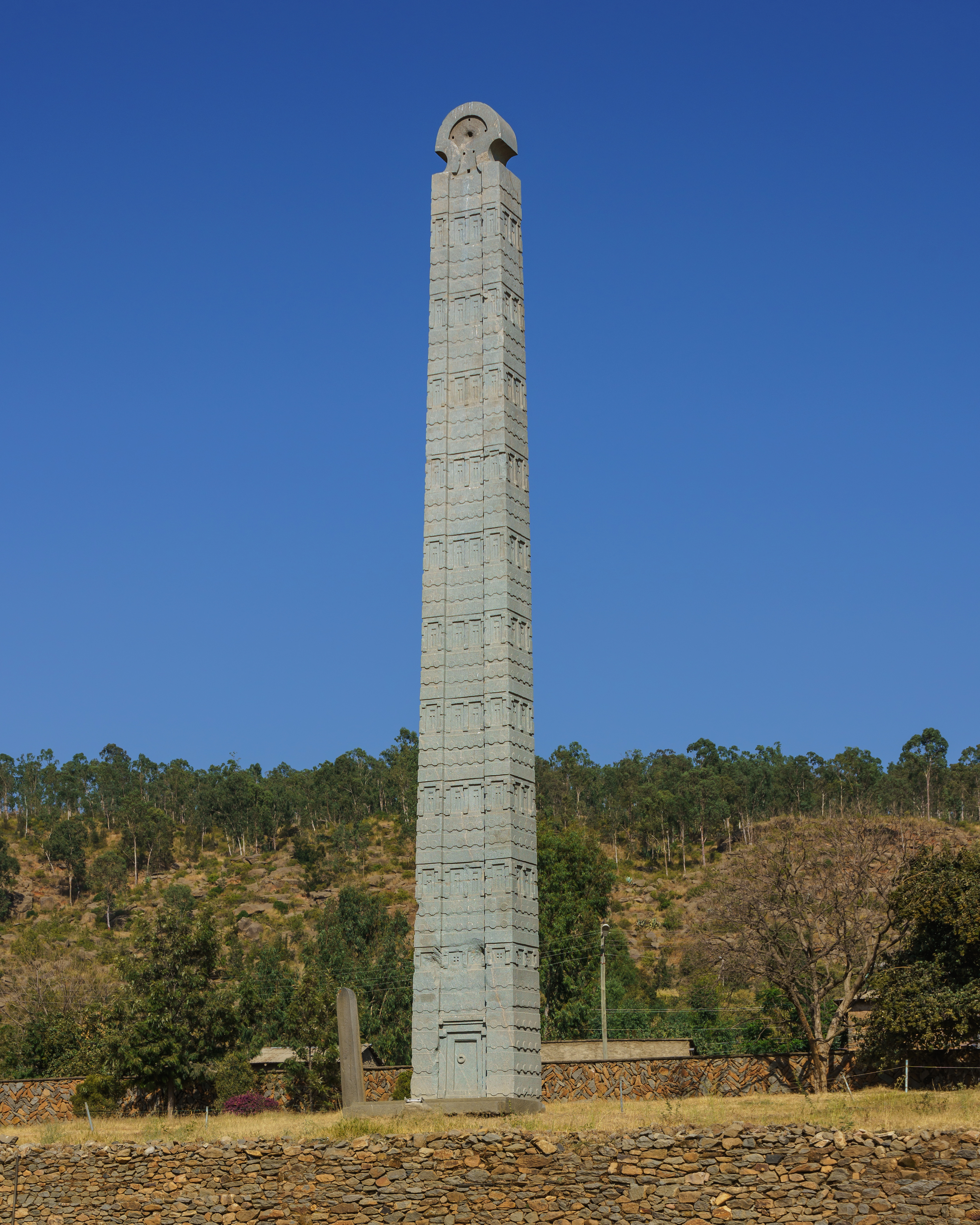
Aksum Obelisk, symbol of the Aksumite civilisation

In the Horn of Africa, there was the Land of Punt, a kingdom on the Red Sea which was a close trading partner of Ancient Egypt in the 3rd and 2nd millennia BC. Archaeologist Rodolfo Fattovich equates it to the Gash Group in the Sudanese-Eritrean lowlands, and some scholars have hypothesised modern-day Somalia, while Kenneth Kitchen and Felix Chami locate it on Zanzibar Island. In the Eritrean-Ethiopian Highlands, the kingdom of dʿmt rose c. 980 BC as the region was incorporated into global trading networks, and it exhibited Sabaean influences which most scholars attribute to a small migration of Sabaeans and their assimilation. Several scholars consider there to have been other contemporaneous states, and dʿmt's collapse in the mid-1st century BC saw the region inhabited by small polities.

Modern-day Somalia was inhabited by nomadic pastoralists, and along the Horn's coast many ancient Somali city-states thrived off of the wider Red Sea trade and enjoyed a lucrative monopoly on cinnamon from India due to their freedom from Roman interference. In the 1st century AD, the Kingdom of Aksum rose from a city-state to rule much of the northern Ethiopian-Eritrean Highlands and the Red Sea port of Adulis. Aksum was described as one of the four great powers by Persian prophet Mani in the 3rd century. King Ezana of Axum converted from traditional religion to Christianity in the 4th century, gradually followed by the population. In the 6th century, Aksum conquered South Arabia, though it struggled to maintain control over the region, and began to gradually lose its dominance over Red Sea trade to Persians and Arabs.

==== Northwest Africa ====
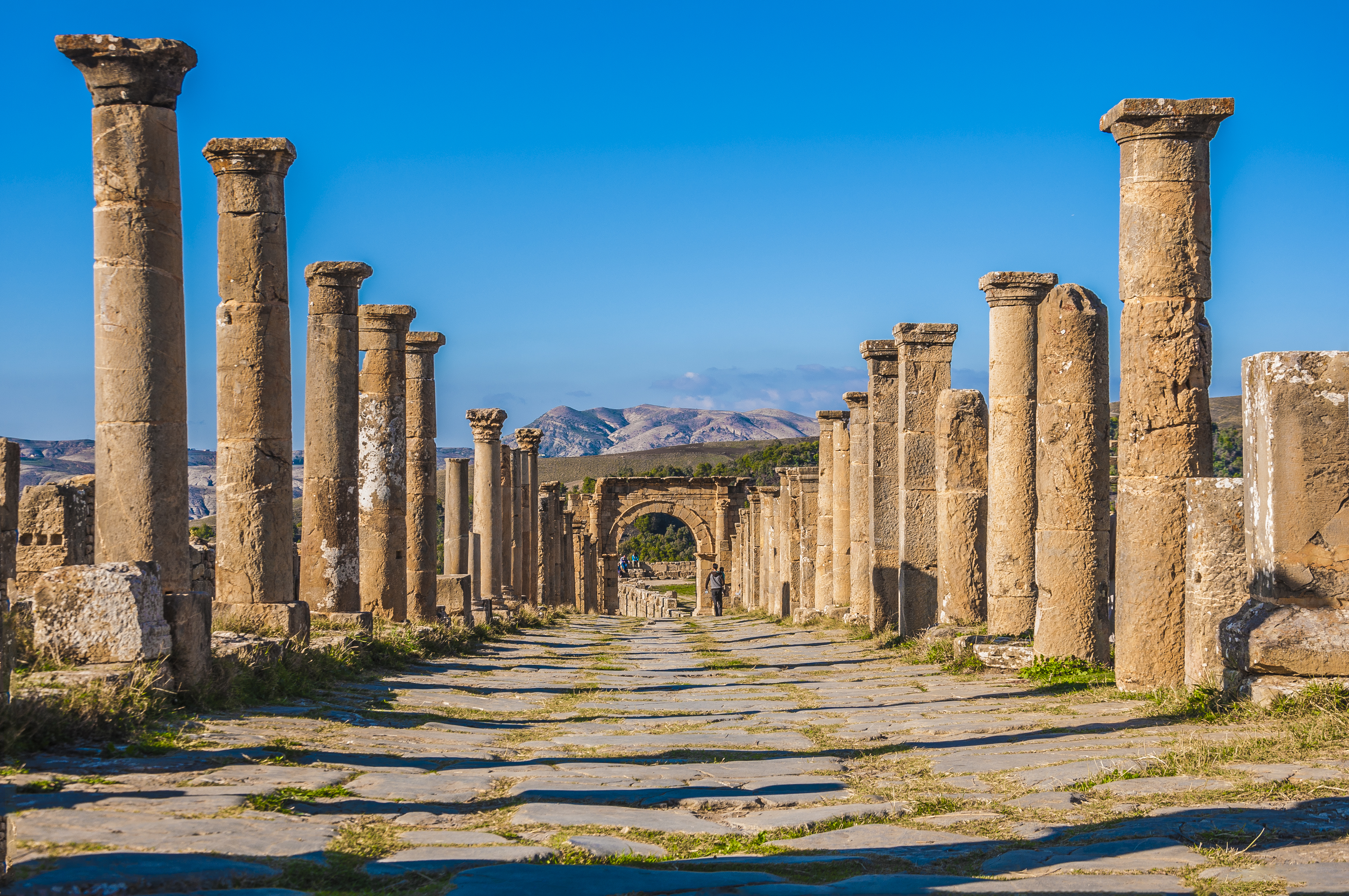
Ruins of Cuicul in Djémila, a Roman town in the ancient province of Mauretania Caesariensis

Northwest Africa (the Maghreb) was inhabited by Berber semi-nomadic pastoralists. In the 1st millennium BC, Phoenician migration and settlement came in search of precious metals in the Gulf of Tunis. This grew into Ancient Carthage after gaining independence from Phoenicia in the 6th century BC, and they built an extensive trading empire with a strict mercantile network. Carthage's collapse and conquest by Rome in the Punic Wars (3rd and 2nd centuries BC) saw Numidia and Mauretania become major powers in the Maghreb.

Towards the end of the 2nd century BC, Mauretania fought alongside King Jugurtha of Numidia against the Romans in the Jugurthine War after he had usurped the Numidian throne from a Roman ally. Together they inflicted heavy casualties, with the war ending inconclusively when King Bocchus I of Mauretania sold out Jugurtha to the Romans. Around the turn of the millennium, both came under direct Roman rule. While Berber traditional religion predominated, some converted to Christianity. In the 5th century AD, the Vandals conquered Roman Africa before the fall of Rome, though the province was reconquered by the Byzantines in the Vandalic War. Large swaths of indigenous peoples regained self-governance in Masuna and its numerous successor polities in the Maghreb, including the kingdoms of Ouarsenis, Aurès, and Altava.

==== West Africa ====
In the western Sahel, the rise of settled communities occurred largely as a result of the domestication of millet and of sorghum, and cattle pastoralism began c. 2500 BC. Extensive east-west belts of deserts, grasslands, and forests from north to south were crucial for the moulding of their respective societies and meant that symbiotic trade relations developed in response to the differing environments. Beginning around 4000 BC, the Tichitt culture in modern-day Mauritania and Mali is the oldest known complexly organised society in West Africa, while others included the Kintampo culture in modern-day Ghana, the Nok culture in modern-day Nigeria, and the Daima culture around Lake Chad.

Towards the end of the 3rd century AD, a wet period in the Sahel created areas for human habitation and exploitation that had not been habitable for the best part of a millennium. The Ghana Empire (also called Wagadu) rose out of the Tichitt culture, growing wealthy following the introduction of the camel to the western Sahel, which revolutionised the trans-Saharan trade that linked their capital and Aoudaghost with Tahert and Sijilmasa in North Africa. Soninke tradition holds that the final founding of Wagadu occurred after Dinga did a deal with Bida, a serpent deity who was guarding a well, to sacrifice one maiden a year in exchange for assurance regarding plenty of rainfall and gold supply. (Note: Bida is stressed as a protective force by narrators; some versions have Bida descending from Dinga, with his children founding Wagadu. Pythons are most at home in grasslands near water, and likely came to be associated with the seasonal rains, with them rarely being seen during the dry periods. As such, snake deities feature prominently in West African traditional religions.) Based on large tumuli scattered across West Africa dating to this period, several scholars have speculated that there were further simultaneous and preceding states relative to Wagadu.

==== Central, Eastern, and Southern Africa ====
In the grasslands of Cameroon, Bantu-speaking agriculturalists migrated southward sometime between 5000 BC and 3000 BC. Despite intensive research, the cause of the migrations, and that of the directions taken, is still unclear; (Note: An initial idea that the dispersal was caused by population pressure following the introduction of farming is generally now discounted.) however, there is consensus that there were multiple dispersal events. Around 1500 BC, Bantu speakers reached central Cameroon. The 'Western Stream' likely followed the coast and the major rivers of the Congo system southwards to reach the southern fringe of the Congolian Rainforest around 500 BC (some may have used the sea to circumvent the rainforest). Their arrival coincided with the spread of iron metallurgy through Central Africa.

Meanwhile, the 'Eastern Stream' travelled either the northern fringe of the rainforest or the Ubangi River eastwards, and reached just west of Lake Victoria around 500 BC. While there, Bantu speakers adopted iron metallurgy from Cushitic speakers already present, and coexisted with them. Dispersal from the Great Lakes region occurred in two more streams. One went west to meet the Western Stream in the DR Congo and Angola, while the other went south and spread across Eastern and Southern Africa.

Around the turn of the millennium, Bantu speakers reached central modern-day Tanzania and near Dar es Salaam, before rapidly moving southwards along the coast to reach modern-day KwaZulu Natal in South Africa around the 3rd century AD. Throughout this, Bantu speakers displaced, replaced, or intermarried with and absorbed hunter-gatherer and agricultural groups.

=== c. 600 – c. 1800 ===
==== North Africa, the Central Sahel and Sudan, and the Horn ====
In the 7th and 8th centuries, as part of the Arab conquests which sought to spread Islamic rule, the Rashidun and Umayyad caliphates conquered North Africa at the expense of the Byzantine Empire and Berber leaders such as Kusaila and Kahina. Large numbers of Berber and Coptic people willingly converted to Islam, and followers of Abrahamic religions ('People of the Book') were protected, though followers of Berber traditional religion were violently oppressed. In the 8th century the Berber Revolt rocked the caliphate, and Berber dynasties took control over the Maghreb, while the Tulunids briefly controlled Egypt.

The expansion of the Almoravid dynasty, a Berber Sanhaja dynasty originating in the Sahara.

In the 10th century, the Fatimids rose to power in modern-day Tunisia, established a rival caliphate, and conquered Egypt, before expanding into the Middle East. In the 11th century, the Almoravids conquered the Maghreb and intervened in the Christian reconquest of Iberia. Saladin, a Fatimid vizier, usurped power in the 12th century and established the Ayyubid dynasty, which restored Egyptian prestige, while the Almohad revolution deposed the Almoravids to the east. After Christian gains in Iberia in the 13th century, the Almohads disintegrated into the Marinids, Zayyanids, and Hafsids in modern-day Morocco, Algeria, and Tunisia, respectively.

In the face of Mongol expansion, Mamluk generals seized power in Egypt and expanded into the Middle East. In the early 16th century, the Ottoman Empire rapidly conquered North Africa (save for Morocco under Saadi rule) to counter Spanish expansionism. (Note: During the 15th century, the Spanish conquered the Canary Islands, and they deported or enslaved the indigenous Berber population (Guanches), forcing them to work on plantations. Combined with mass killings and disease, this caused the annihilation of the Guanches. There is scholarly debate about whether it constituted genocide, and it served as a blueprint for European colonialism in the Americas.) In the following centuries, over a million Europeans are estimated to have been captured and enslaved by Barbary corsairs. The Ottoman regencies became more independent during the 18th century.

In the central Sahel around Lake Chad, the Kanem–Bornu Empire ruled from the 6th century, and it projected power over the Hausa Kingdoms. To the east during the 7th century, Makuria conquered Nobatia to become the dominant power in the region and resisted Muslim expansion. They later entered a severe decline following civil war and Arab migrations to the Sudan and had disintegrated by the 15th century, giving rise to the Funj Sultanate. The Tunjur kingdom's collapse in the central Sudan saw the rise of the Bagirmi, Wadai, and Darfur sultanates, (Note: The region was very ethnically diverse, and for the Keira dynasty of Darfur it was common to intermarry with other ethnic groups, such that the royal family was open to integrating strangers into the elite. Over the course of its existence, the expansion of the state was often done via integration and assimilation rather than by war.) which frequently raided the populations to their south for slaves.

In the Horn of Africa, Aksum lost control of the Red Sea, and its isolation from Christendom caused Ethiopian society to introspect and take inspiration from the Old Testament. Islamised Beja invaded the Ethiopian Highlands, forcing Aksum to migrate south, where, according to tradition, Aksum's expansion was met by a Jewish or traditionalist queen who destroyed the state c. 960. During the 13th century, hegemony in the Horn was contested by the Christian Zagwe, the Muslims of Shewa, and the traditionalist Damot; the Solomonic dynasty overthrew the Zagwe to found the Ethiopian Empire, while Shewa was replaced by Ifat. Soon after, Ethiopia conquered Damot and the Muslim states, entering into a 'golden age'.

In the 16th century, Muslims united behind Adal in jihad to reconquer the Muslim lands and occupy Ethiopia, until, with Portuguese assistance, Ethiopia counter-attacked, and its sovereignty was restored in a reduced state. The 16th and 17th centuries also saw Oromo invasions into the Horn, weakening Ethiopia further and causing the collapse of Adal, while Ajuran on the east coast also disintegrated. Ethiopia briefly consolidated its authority in the late-17th century, though the turn of the century saw fragmentation and gradually increasing anarchy, which continued throughout the 18th century.

==== West Africa ====
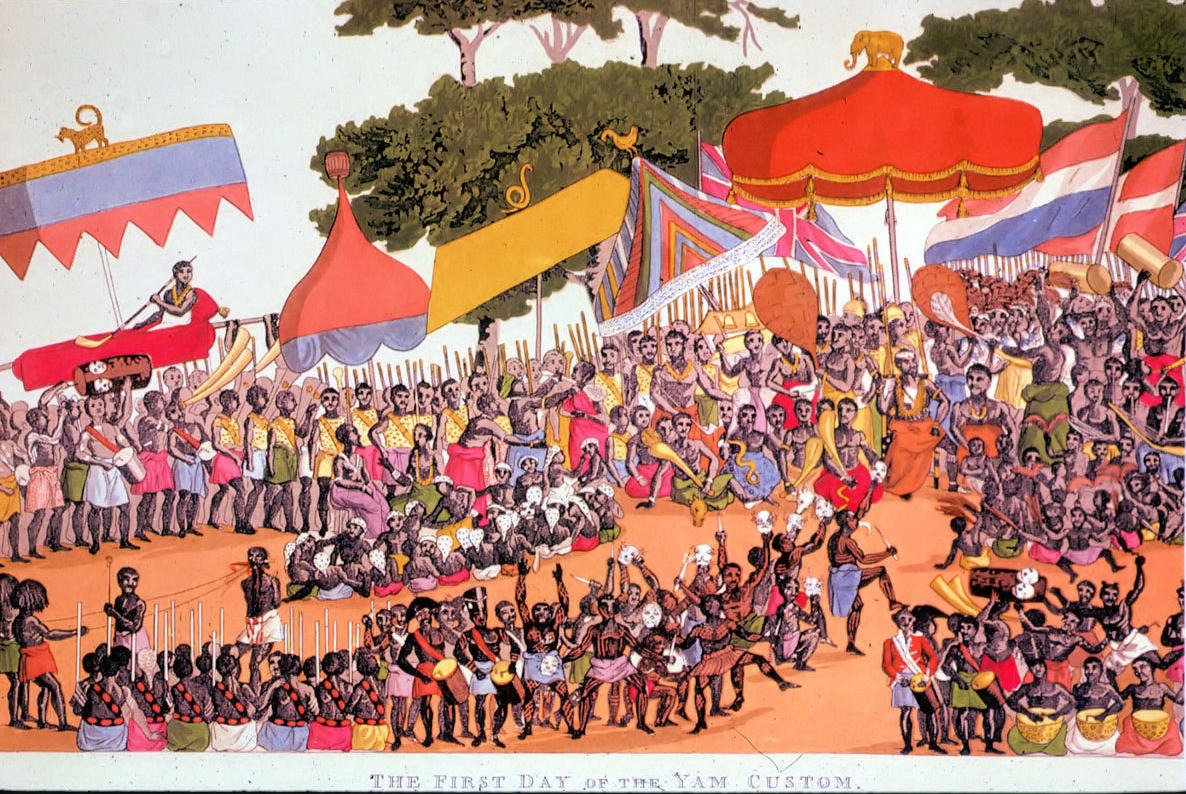
Yam festival in the Ashanti Empire

The Ghana Empire formed in the Sahel between the 2nd and 8th centuries, while from the 7th century the Gao Empire ruled to its east. Almoravid capture of royal Aoudaghost led to Ghana's conversion to Islam in the 11th century, and climatic changes led to Ghana's conquest by its vassal Sosso Empire in the 13th century. Sosso was quickly overthrown by the Mali Empire, which conquered Gao and dominated the trans-Saharan trade. The Mossi Kingdoms were established to its south.

The 15th century saw the crumbling of the Mali Empire, with the dominant power in the region becoming the Songhai Empire centered on Gao. Weakened by internal conflict, in 1591 Gao was conquered by Morocco, and the political vacuum came to be filled by the Segou Empire and several other states. The once lucrative trans-Saharan trade gradually lost its prominence to the coastal Atlantic trade with Europeans, and the following centuries saw many droughts, famines, and epidemics.

In the forest regions of West Africa, various kingdoms and empires flourished, such as the Yoruba empires of Ife and Oyo, the Igbo Kingdom of Nri, the Edo Kingdom of Benin (famous for its art), the Dagomba Kingdom of Dagbon, and the Akan kingdoms of Bonoman and Adanse. They came into contact with the Portuguese in the 15th century, which saw the start of the Atlantic slave trade. The Asante Empire was established in present-day Ghana. Between 1515 and 1800, 8 million Africans were exported in the Atlantic slave trade.

==== Central Africa ====
In the western Congo Basin, by the 13th century, there were three main confederations of states: the Seven Kingdoms, Mpemba, and one led by Vungu. In the 14th century, the Kingdom of Kongo emerged and dominated the region, with the Tio Kingdom to its north and Mwene Muji to its northeast. Portuguese arrival in the 15th century saw Kongo's ruler willingly convert to Catholicism and the start of the Atlantic trade, with slaves being the most lucrative export; in the 16th century, Afonso I's conquests produced many captives for Kongo's monopoly, and the slave trade rapidly grew to meet demand in the Americas. Over the course of the late-16th and 17th centuries, the Portuguese sought to conquer Ndongo (allied to Matamba) in the Angolan Wars; (Note: The number of slaves exported from Portuguese Angola increased from 5000 annually in the 1590s (half of the total number of Africans exported to the Americas) to between 9000 and 12,000 (80% of the total in 1620), largely derived from warfare.) despite fierce resistance from Queen Nzinga, and brief occupation of Luanda by the Dutch (allied to Kongo), Portugal controlled most of Ndongo by the 1670s. (Note: The Imbangala, a series of militaristic groups, served as mercenaries and were enlisted by both sides, but were especially decisive for the Portuguese. They were notorious for pillaging and causing destruction. One of the groups founded the Kasanje Kingdom.) The late-17th century saw Kongo fragment between royal houses as several vassals broke away; by the time of Kongo's restoration in 1709, it had ceased being the dominant regional power. Also during the 17th century, in the textile-producing northeast, the Boma, Yaka, and possibly the Kuba and Pende kingdoms broke away from Mwene Muji.

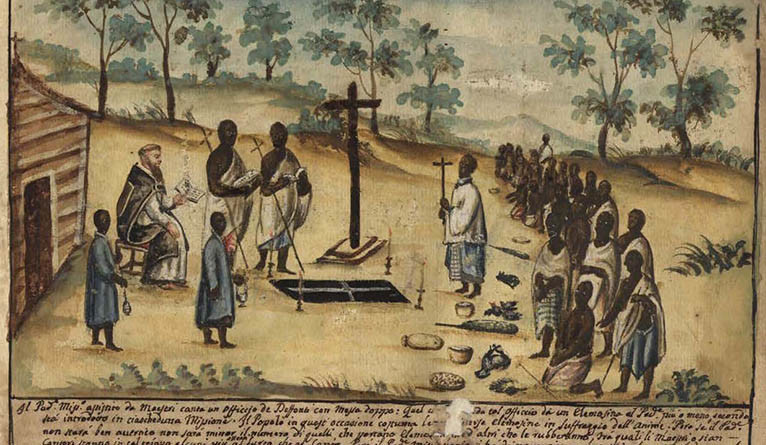
Christian funeral in the Kingdom of Kongo, c. 1750

In the eastern Congo Basin, farmers, fishermen, and hunters (often Pygmies) built symbiotic relations. Jan Vansina wrote that in the southern savanna 'lords of the land' held priestly roles due to their special relationship with the spirits of the land, and held sway over multiple villages, effectively ruling embryonic kingdoms. Accordingly, as lineages grew, authority was opportunistically absorbed or incorporated by force. The centre of the Luba Empire is yet to undergo archaeological research, meaning knowledge about its rise is limited; its foundation is typically dated to the 14th/15th centuries, though scholarly estimates range from the 8th to 17th centuries. A Lunda state formed in the Nkalany Valley (estimates range from c. 1450 to c. 1700), in the 18th century, Lunda rapidly expanded into an extensive commonwealth across the southern savanna, using the institutions of perpetual kinship and positional succession to incorporate peoples. (Note: 'Positional succession' was where a successor would take on their predecessor's identity, relationships, and duties, while 'perpetual kinship' involved permanent kinship ties between positions.) Meanwhile, Luba expanded its number of tributaries, in some cases using its widely acknowledged prestige to intervene in succession disputes and distribute ritually powerful royal regalia related to bulopwe (sacred kingship), in other cases using conquest.

In the northern Great Lakes, the Empire of Kitara rose around the 11th century, famed for its oral traditions. Historian Peter Robertshaw considers its rulers (the Chwezi) to have been religious leaders who utilised networks of hill-top shrines (Note: The shrines were dedicated to ancestral spirits of clans, and were common across the Great Lakes. They were closely associated with healing and collective prosperity, and served as centres.) to project authority. Around 1500, severe droughts and famine destabilised the region, occurring again during the early-17th and 18th centuries. Luo-speaking peoples migrated from the Upper Nile basin into modern-day Uganda, and a Biito dynasty replaced the Chwezi in Bunyoro-Kitara. Over the following centuries, the kingdoms of Bunyoro-Kitara, Buganda, and Rwanda struggled for hegemony among others. Throughout the 16th and 17th centuries, Bunyoro raided states to the south such as Nkore and Rwanda. Mpororo rose and fragmented during the 18th century, while Buganda rapidly expanded at the expense of Bunyoro to become the major power in the region.

==== Eastern and Southern Africa ====
The East African interior was inhabited by pastoralist Cushitic and Nilotic speakers, along with Bantu speakers who continued to expand and adapt to their lands while absorbing the former two; the 17th century saw the establishment of tributary systems that stabilised the region. On the Swahili coast the Swahili city-states thrived off of the Indian Ocean trade and gradually Islamised, giving rise to the Kilwa Sultanate from the 10th century. In the 15th century, trade routes for Zimbabwean gold shifted north, weakening Kilwa. The Portuguese arrived at the coast soon after and exploited divisions between coastal city-states to gain control over them while utilising a powerful navy. In the 17th and 18th centuries, Lamu-Swahili cities rebelled against the Portuguese and allied with the Omani Empire, which supplanted Portuguese rule.

Madagascar was settled by Austronesian peoples between the 5th and 7th centuries, as societies organised at the behest of hasina and competed with one another over the island's estuaries and bridgeheads. From around the 15th century, southern Madagascar became integrated into global trade; the Sakalava Empire rose to dominate west-coastal trade, accompanied by numerous other states, and the island saw several failed European colonial ventures.

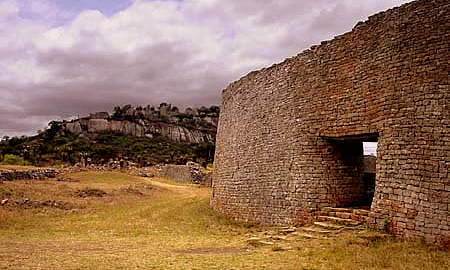
Ruins of Great Zimbabwe, which flourished in the 11th to 15th centuries

In Southern Africa, an early kingdom was Mapungubwe, which collapsed c. 1300 as Great Zimbabwe, with its monumental dry-stone walls, rose to become the region's main political and economic centre. Following shifting trade routes north to the Zambezi and unclear circumstances, Great Zimbabwe entered into decline and was succeeded by the Mutapa Empire and Kingdom of Butua in the 15th century. Mutapa was briefly vassalised by the Portuguese in the 17th century, the latter half of which saw widespread famine and disease, until Changamire Dombo revolted in the 1680s, conquered Butua to found the Rozvi Empire, and expelled all Portuguese from the Zimbabwean plateau. Maravi around Lake Malawi expanded in the 17th century, but the collapse of its succession system in the 18th century precipitated its disintegration.

By the late-1st millennium CE, Bantu-speaking farmers populated most of Southern Africa's cultivable savannas, reaching southwards to the Kei River; they traded goods such as livestock, grain, and metal tools between communities and with hunter-gatherers. Around the 11th century, more agriculturists—who likely brought with them ancestral Nguni and Sotho-Tswana languages—migrated across the Limpopo River and came to dominate the earlier farmers both politically and culturally, organising into loosely-defined chiefdoms that held dynamic alliance networks. Further south, the Dutch began colonizing the western Cape in the 17th century, and Britain seized control of the Dutch Cape Colony around the turn of the 19th century. In the late-18th century, the interplay of pre-existing trends of political centralisation with the effects of international trade, environmental instability, and European colonisation set the Mfecane ("Crushing") in motion, as various African states were founded.

=== c. 1800 – c. 1935 ===
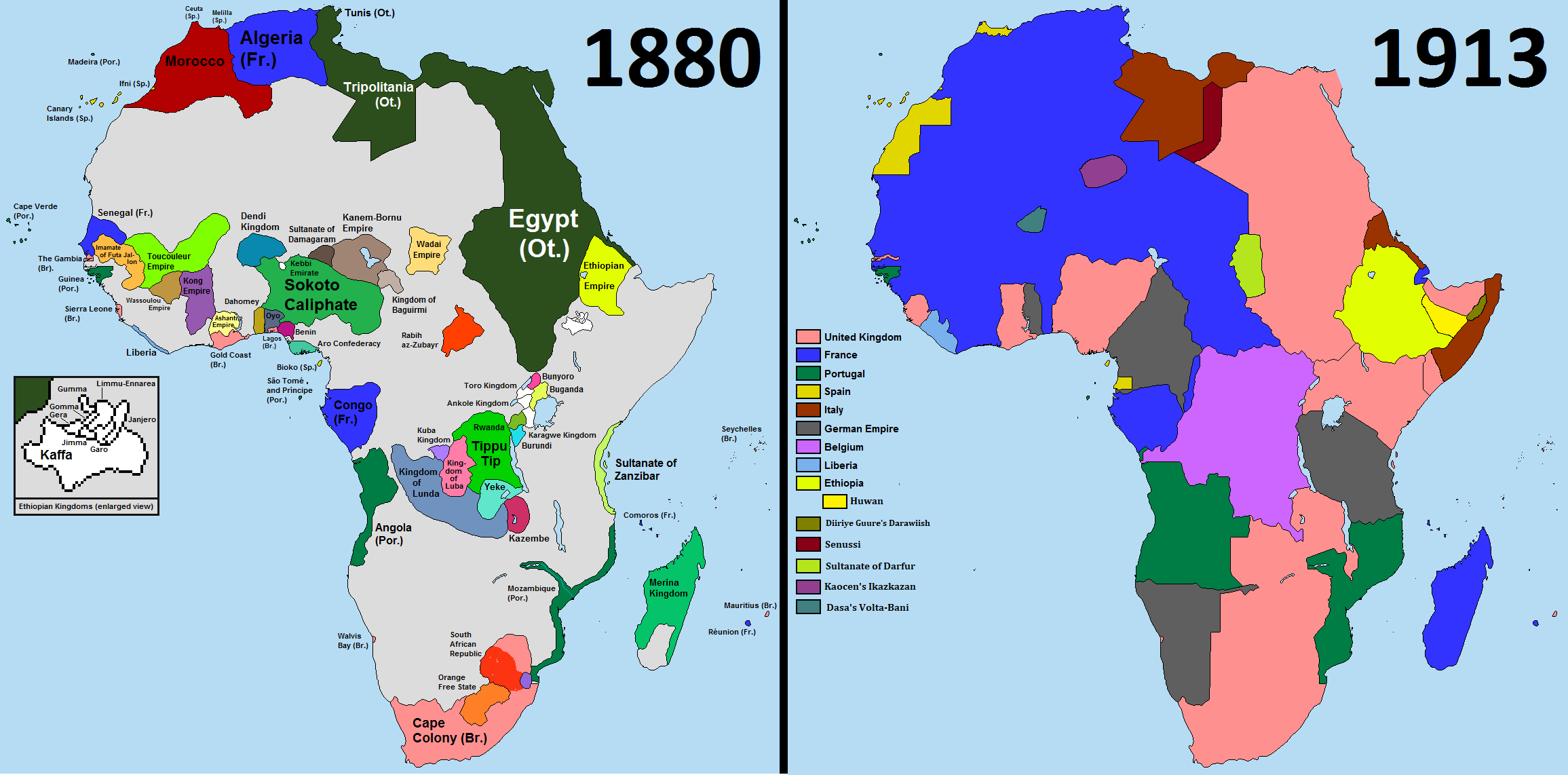
Comparison of Africa in 1880 and 1913, showing the "Scramble for Africa" by the European powers

By the turn of the 19th century, many of Africa's economic and political structures were unstable and brittle as a result of long-term effects of the slave trade. In Egypt, Muhammad Ali led a national movement to seize power from Ottoman suzerainty, instituting sweeping reforms and greatly strengthening Egyptian power by militaristic expansion. Meanwhile, in West Africa, the Fula jihads, which had been gaining momentum throughout the 18th century, culminated in the establishment of the expansive Sokoto and Hamdullahi caliphates. In the Horn, Ethiopia underwent reforms, seeking to revive the imperial state, something that was later achieved by Menelik II's conquests. In Southern Africa, the Mfecane propelled large long-distance migrations that caused widespread disruption across the vast region, while several Boer republics were founded. European campaigns to abolish the Atlantic slave trade led to supply refocusing on internal markets and saw the rapid growth of the Indian Ocean slave trade. Across the continent, many rulers attempted reforms and indigenous forms of 'modernisation'; however, these efforts were consistently undermined by European traders and missionaries as the tide of European encroachment rose.

For 400 years, European nations had mainly limited their involvement to trading stations on the African coast, with few daring to venture inland. The Industrial Revolution in Europe produced several technological innovations which assisted them in overcoming this 400-year pattern. One was the development of repeating rifles, which were easier and quicker to load than muskets. Artillery was being used increasingly. In 1885, Hiram Maxim developed the Maxim gun, the model of the modern-day machine gun. European states kept these weapons largely among themselves by refusing to sell these weapons to African leaders. African germs took numerous European lives and deterred permanent settlements. Diseases such as yellow fever, sleeping sickness, yaws, and leprosy made Africa a very inhospitable place for Europeans. The deadliest disease was malaria, endemic throughout Tropical Africa. In 1854, the discovery of quinine and other medical innovations helped to make conquest and colonisation in Africa possible.

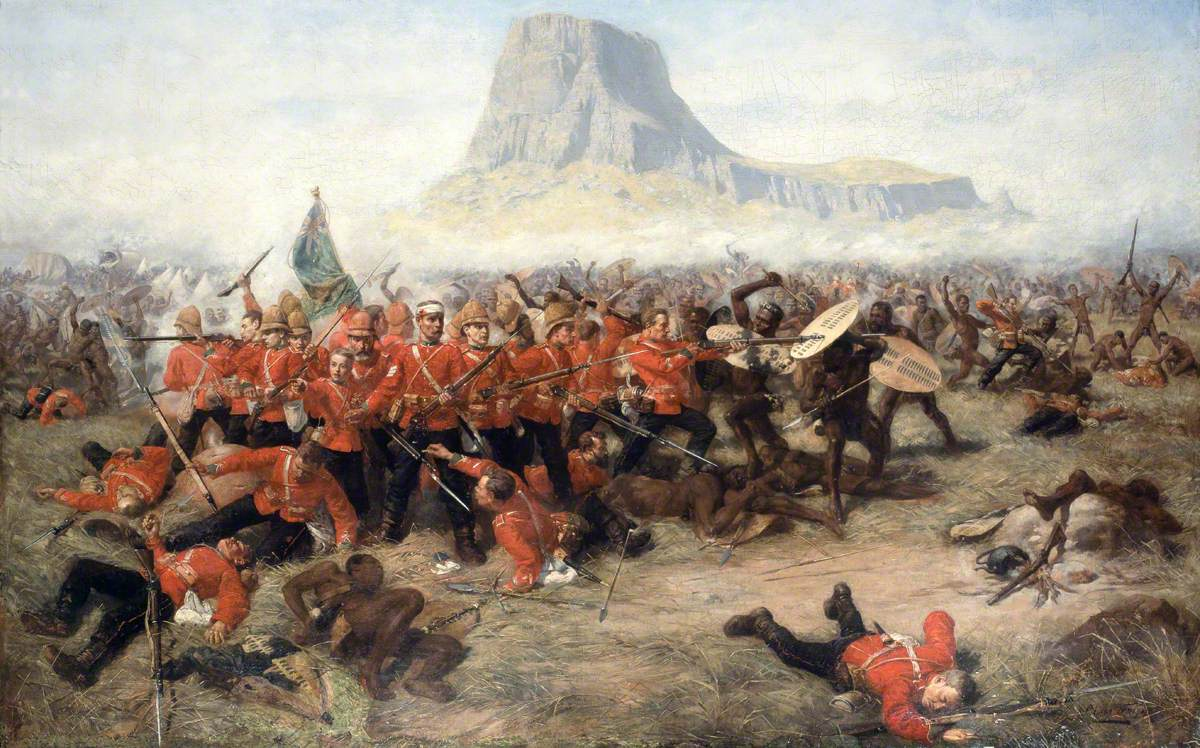
The Battle of Isandlwana (1879), a decisive Zulu victory over a British invasion force during the Anglo-Zulu War.

There were strong motives for the conquest of Africa. Raw materials were needed for European factories, and free trade was championed to prevent Africans from regulating their economies. Prestige and imperial rivalries were at play. Acquiring African colonies would show rivals that a nation was powerful and significant. These contextual factors forged the Scramble for Africa; during the late 19th and early 20th centuries, the European powers partitioned and conquered almost all of Africa despite fierce resistance (only Ethiopia and Liberia remained independent). Traditional leaders were incorporated into the colonial regimes as a form of indirect rule to extract human and natural resources and curb organised resistance. Colonial borders were drawn unilaterally by the Europeans, often cutting across bonds of kinship, language, culture, and established routes, and sometimes incorporating groups who previously had little in common. The threat to trade routes was mitigated by poor policing and African entrepreneurs (viewed as smugglers) who exploited the differing tax and legal schemes. The first few decades of European colonialism saw intense violence, disorder, and atrocities, such as that of the Congo Free State, German South West Africa, and French Algeria, with the late colonial period relatively peaceful in comparison. Colonial rule had wide-reaching effects on African societies, such as the spread of Christianity as part of the 'civilising mission'. African culture was strongly denigrated and persecuted, as pervasive racial discrimination deepened the scars of humiliation.

=== Independence struggles ===
European colonial presence in Africa as of 1939

Imperial rule by Europeans continued until after the conclusion of World War II, when almost all remaining colonial territories gradually obtained formal independence. Independence movements in Africa gained momentum following World War II, which left the major European powers weakened. In 1951, Libya, a former Italian colony, gained independence. In 1956, Tunisia and Morocco won their independence from France. Ghana followed suit in 1957, becoming the first of the sub-Saharan colonies to be granted independence. Over the next decade, waves of decolonisation took place across the continent, culminating in the 1960 Year of Africa and the establishment of the Organisation of African Unity in 1963.

Portugal's overseas presence in sub-Saharan Africa (most notably in Angola, Cape Verde, Mozambique, Guinea-Bissau, and São Tomé and Príncipe) lasted from the 16th century to 1975, after the Estado Novo regime was overthrown in a military coup in Lisbon. Rhodesia unilaterally declared independence from the United Kingdom in 1965, under the white minority government of Ian Smith, but it was not internationally recognised as an independent state (as Zimbabwe) until 1980, when black nationalists gained power after a bitter guerrilla war. Although South Africa was one of the first African countries to gain independence, the state remained under the control of the country's white minority, initially through qualified voting rights and from 1956 by a system of racial segregation known as apartheid, until 1994.

=== Post-colonial Africa ===
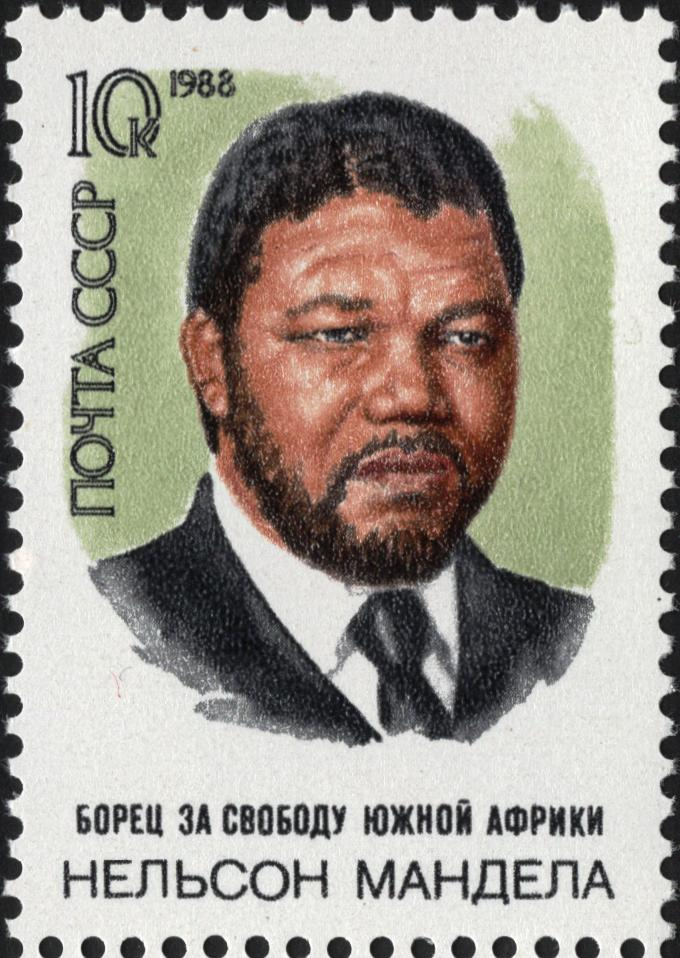
1988 Soviet commemorative stamp, captioned "Fighter for the freedom of South Africa Nelson Mandela" in Russian

As of 2025, Africa contains 54 sovereign countries. Since independence, African states have frequently been hampered by instability, corruption, violence, and authoritarianism. The vast majority of African states are republics that operate under some form of the presidential system of rule. However, few of them have been able to sustain democratic governments on a permanent basis—per the criteria laid out by Lührmann et al. (2018), only Botswana and Mauritius have been consistently democratic for the entirety of their post-colonial history. Most African countries have experienced several coups or periods of military dictatorship. Between 1990 and 2018, though, the continent as a whole has trended towards more democratic governance.

Upon independence, an overwhelming majority of Africans lived in extreme poverty. The continent suffered from a lack of infrastructural or industrial development under colonial rule, along with political instability. With limited financial resources or access to global markets, relatively stable countries such as Kenya still experienced only very slow economic development. Only a handful of countries succeeded in obtaining rapid economic growth prior to 1990. Exceptions include Libya and Equatorial Guinea, both of which possess large oil reserves.

Instability after decolonisation resulted primarily from marginalisation of ethnic groups, as well as corruption. In pursuit of personal political gain, many leaders deliberately promoted ethnic conflicts, some of which had originated during the colonial period, such as from the grouping of multiple unrelated ethnic groups into a single colony, the splitting of a distinct ethnic group between multiple colonies, or existing conflicts being exacerbated by colonial rule (for instance, the preferential treatment given to ethnic Hutus over Tutsis in Rwanda during German and Belgian rule).

Faced with increasingly frequent and severe violence, military rule was widely accepted by the population of many countries as a means to maintain order, and during the 1970s and 1980s a majority of African countries were controlled by military dictatorships. Territorial disputes between nations and rebellions by groups seeking independence were also common in independent African states. The most devastating of these was the Nigerian Civil War, fought between government forces and an Igbo separatist republic, which resulted in a famine that killed 1–2 million people. Two civil wars in Sudan, the first lasting from 1955 to 1972 and the second from 1983 to 2005, collectively killed around 3 million. Both were fought primarily on ethnic and religious lines.

Cold War conflicts between the United States and the Soviet Union also contributed to instability. Both the Soviet Union and the United States offered considerable incentives to political and military leaders who aligned themselves with the superpowers' foreign policy. As an example, during the Angolan Civil War, the Soviet- and Cuban-aligned MPLA and the American-aligned UNITA received the vast majority of their military and political support from these countries. Many African countries became highly dependent on foreign aid. The sudden loss of both Soviet and American aid at the end of the Cold War and the fall of the USSR resulted in severe economic and political turmoil in the countries most dependent on foreign support.

There was a major famine in Ethiopia between 1983 and 1985, killing up to 1.2 million people, which most historians attribute primarily to the forced relocation of farmworkers and seizure of grain by the communist Derg government, further exacerbated by the Ethiopian Civil War. In 1994, a genocide in Rwanda resulted in up to 800,000 deaths, added to a severe refugee crisis and fuelled the rise of militia groups in neighbouring countries. This contributed to the outbreak of the First and Second Congo Wars, which were the most devastating military conflicts in modern Africa, with up to 5.5 million deaths, making it by far the deadliest conflict in modern African history and one of the costliest wars in human history. In 2025, it is estimated that 20% of Africans face hunger in 2025, compared to 6% in Asia, 5% in Latin America and the Caribbean, 8% in Oceania, and less than 2.5% in North America and Europe.

An animated map shows the order of independence of African nations, 1950–2011.

Africa's wars and conflicts, 1980–96
Major wars/conflicts (>100,000 casualties)
Minor wars/conflicts
Other conflicts

Political map of Africa in 2021

Various conflicts between various insurgent groups and governments continue. From 2003 to 2020, a conflict in Darfur resulted in around 300,000 deaths. The Boko Haram insurgency in Sub-Saharan Africa has killed around 350,000 people since 2009. The Tigray war from 2020 to 2022 killed an estimated 300,000–500,000 people, primarily due to famine. Overall, violence across Africa has greatly declined in the 21st century, with the end of civil wars in Angola, Sierra Leone, and Algeria in 2002, Liberia in 2003, and Sudan and Burundi in 2005. The Second Congo War, which involved 9 countries and several insurgent groups, ended in 2003. This decline in violence coincided with many countries abandoning communist-style command economies and opening up for market reforms, which over the course of the 1990s and 2000s promoted the establishment of permanent, peaceful trade between neighbouring countries.

Improved stability and economic reforms have led to a great increase in foreign investment into many nations, mainly from China, which further spurred economic growth. Between 2000 and 2014, annual GDP growth in sub-Saharan Africa averaged 5%, doubling its total GDP from $811 billion to $1.63 trillion (constant 2015 USD). North Africa experienced comparable growth rates. A significant part of this growth can also be attributed to the facilitated diffusion of information technologies, specifically the mobile telephone. While several individual countries have maintained high growth rates, since 2014 overall growth has considerably slowed, primarily as a result of falling commodity prices, continued lack of industrialisation, and epidemics such as Ebola and COVID-19.

== Geography ==
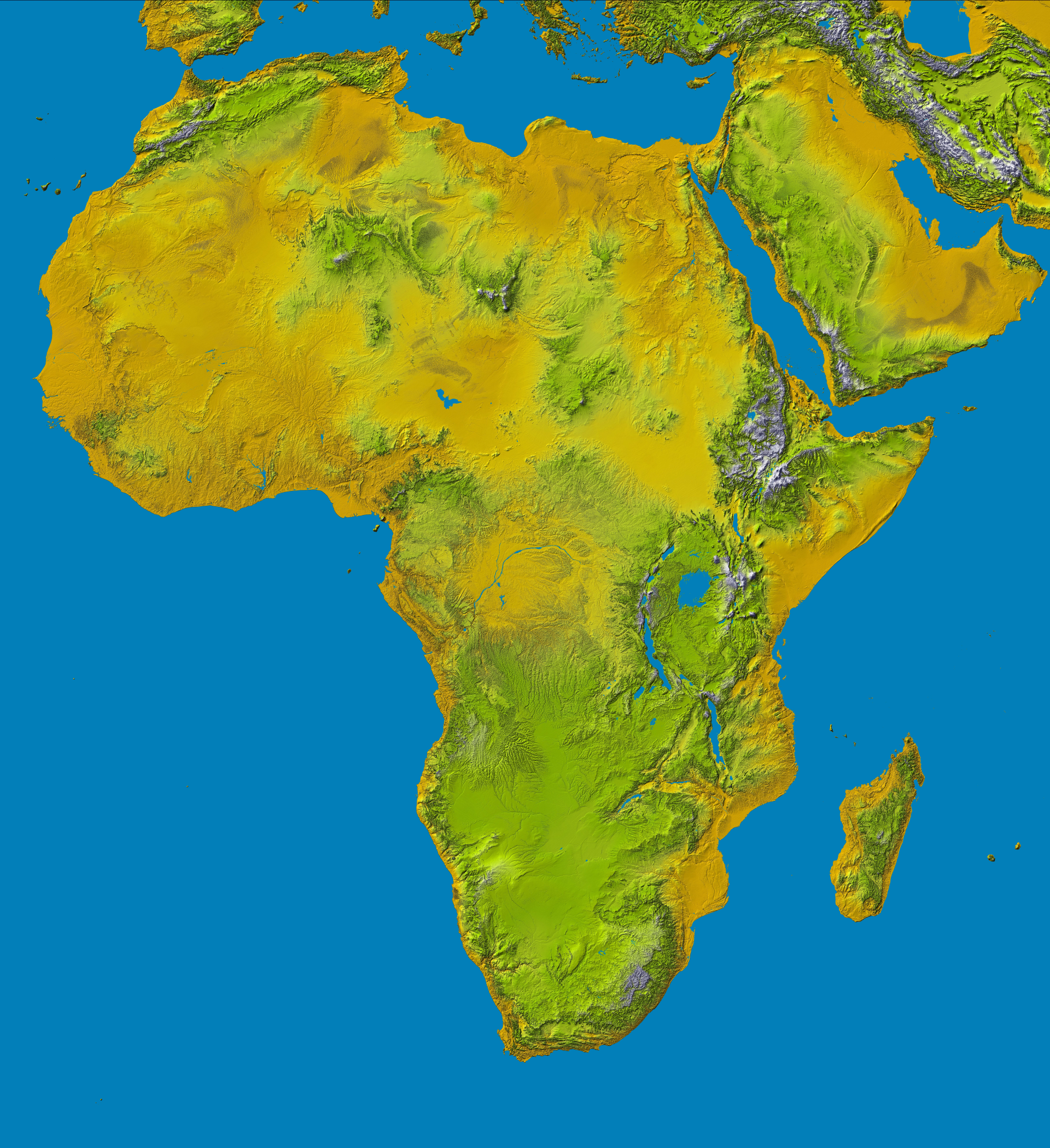
Topography of Africa

Africa is the largest of the three great southward projections from the largest landmass of the Earth. Separated from Europe by the Mediterranean Sea, it is joined to Asia at its northeast extremity by the Isthmus of Suez (transected by the Suez Canal), 163 km (101 mi) wide. Geopolitically, Egypt's Sinai Peninsula east of the Suez Canal is often considered part of Africa as well.

The size of Africa compared to other continents

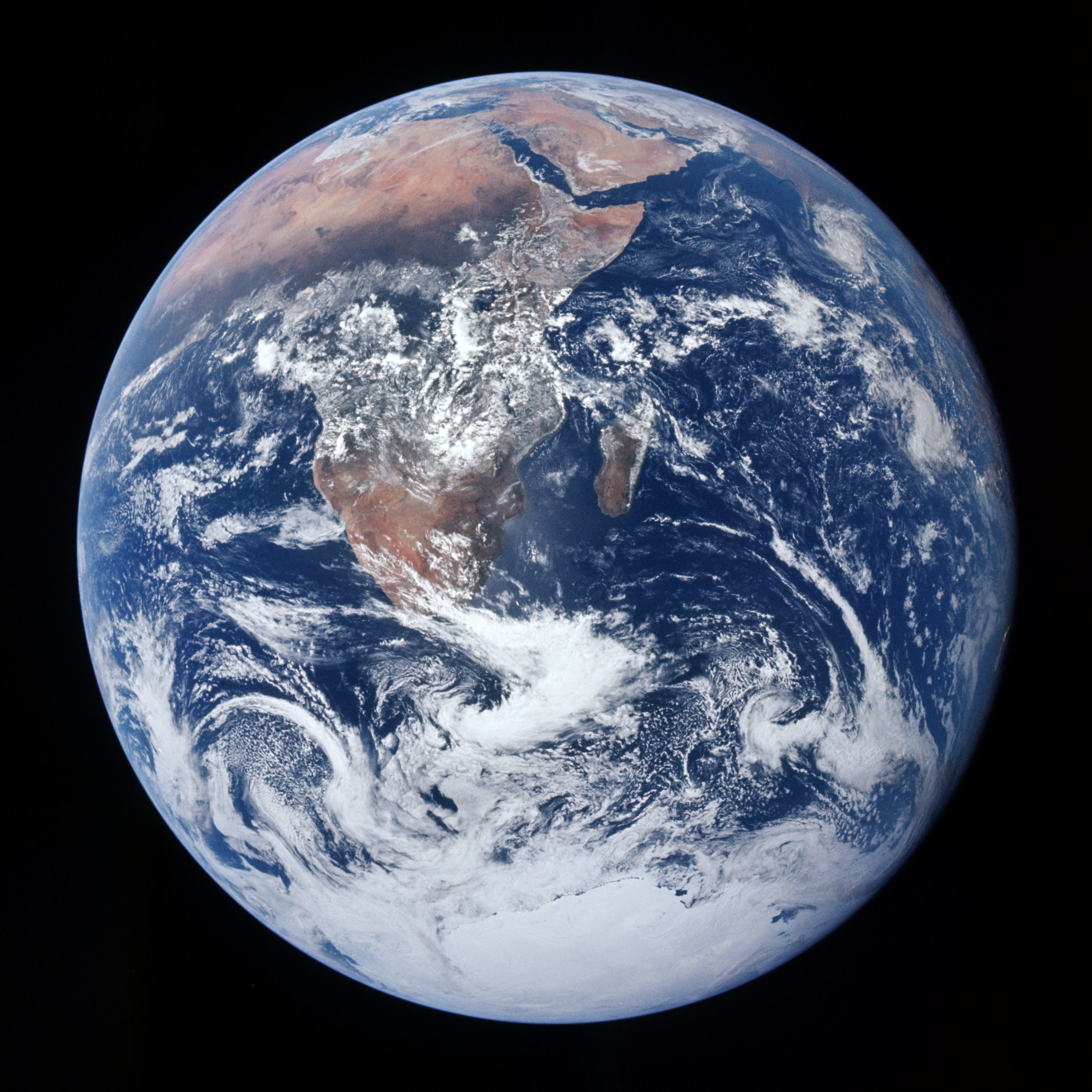
Africa seen from the Moon on The Blue Marble photograph, 1972

The coastline is 26,000 km (16,000 mi) long, and the absence of deep indentations of the shore is illustrated by the fact that Europe, which covers only 10,400,000 km^{2} (4,000,000 sq mi) – about a third of the surface of Africa – has a coastline of 32,000 km (20,000 mi). From the most northerly point, Ras ben Sakka in Tunisia (37°21' N), to the most southerly point, Cape Agulhas in South Africa (34°51'15" S), is a distance of approximately 8,000 km (5,000 mi). Cape Verde, 17°33'22" W, the westernmost point, is a distance of approximately 7,400 km (4,600 mi) to Ras Hafun, 51°27'52" E, the most easterly projection that neighbours Cape Guardafui, the tip of the Horn of Africa.

The largest country is Algeria, and the smallest is Seychelles, an archipelago off the east coast. The smallest nation on the continental mainland is The Gambia.

=== African plate ===
The African plate, also known as the Nubian plate, is a major tectonic plate that includes most of the continent of Africa (except for its easternmost part) and the adjacent oceanic crust to the west and south. It also includes a narrow strip of West Asia along the Mediterranean Sea, including much of Israel, Lebanon, and Palestine. It is bounded by the North American plate and South American plate to the west (separated by the Mid-Atlantic Ridge); the Arabian plate and Somali plate to the east; the Eurasian plate, Aegean Sea plate and Anatolian plate to the north; and the Antarctic plate to the south.

Between 60 million years ago and 10 million years ago, the Somali plate began rifting from the African plate along the East African Rift. Since the continent of Africa consists of crust from both the African and the Somali plates, some literature refers to the African plate as the Nubian plate to distinguish it from the continent as a whole.

Today, the African Plate is moving over Earth's surface at a speed of 0.292° ± 0.007° per million years, relative to the "average" Earth (NNR-MORVEL56).

=== Climate ===
The climate of Africa ranges from tropical to subarctic on its highest peaks. Its northern half is primarily desert or arid, while its central and southern areas contain both savanna plains and dense jungle (rainforest) regions. In between, there is a convergence, where vegetation patterns such as Sahel and steppe dominate. Africa is the hottest continent on Earth, and 60% of the land surface consists of drylands and deserts. The record for the highest-ever recorded temperature, in Libya in 1922 (58 °C (136 °F)), was discredited in 2013.

=== Climate change ===
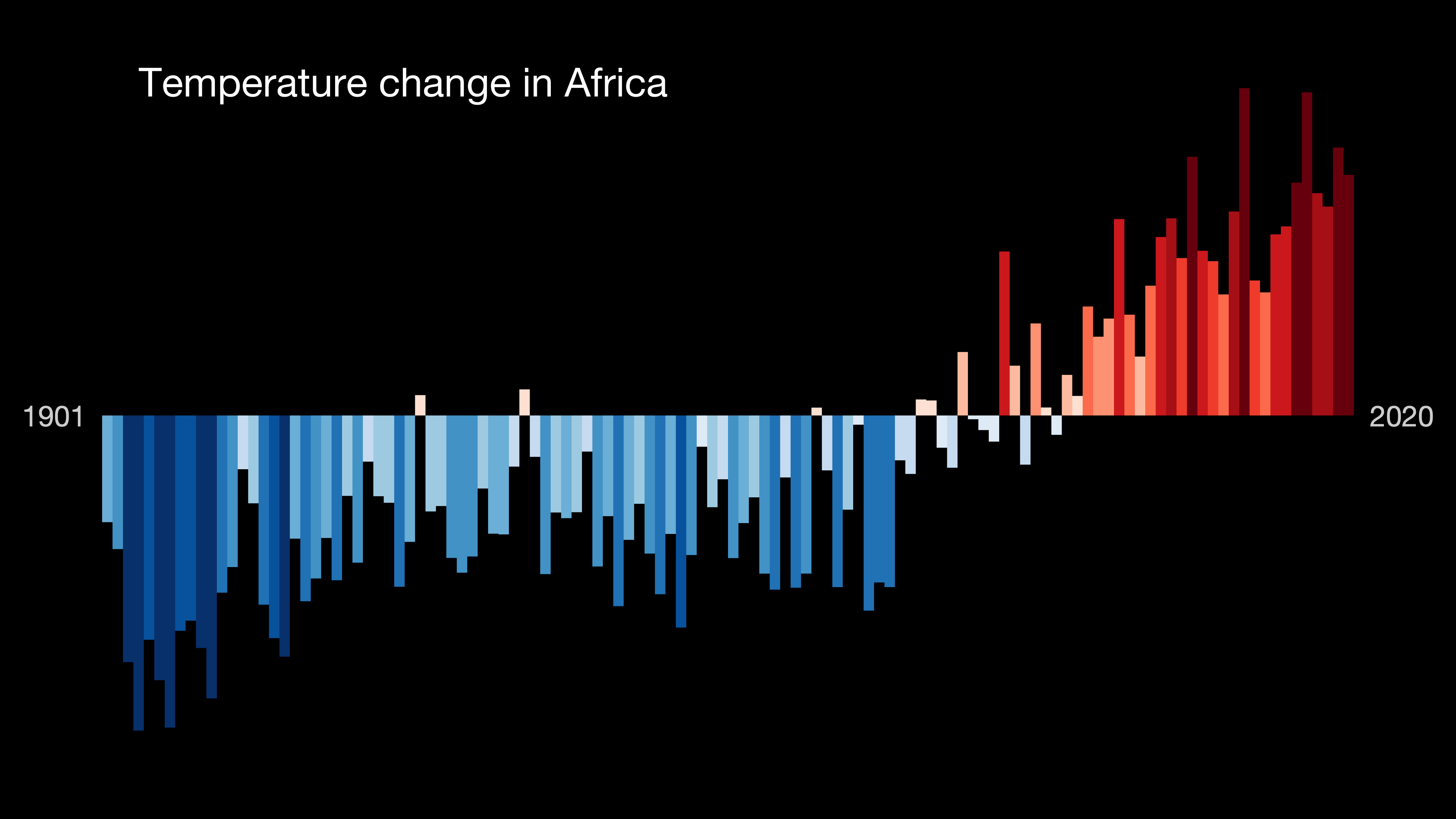
Graph showing temperature change in Africa between 1901 and 2021, with red colour being warmer and blue being colder than average (The average temperature during 1971–2000 is taken as the reference point for these changes.)

Climate change in Africa is a serious threat because the continent is one of the most vulnerable regions to the effects of climate change, despite being responsible for less than 4% of global greenhouse gas emissions. Climate change is causing increasingly erratic rainfall patterns, more frequent extreme weather events such as droughts and floods, and rising sea-surface temperatures across the continent. These changes threaten food and water security, biodiversity, public health, and economic development. Africa is currently warming faster than the rest of the world on average.

Climate change intensifies existing socioeconomic vulnerabilities. Large segments of the African population depend on climate-sensitive livelihoods such as agriculture (55 - 62% of the workforce in sub-Saharan Africa) and already live in poverty, heightening their exposure to shocks. Health outcomes worsen as heat stress, vector-borne diseases (such as malaria and dengue), and malnutrition become more prevalent. Over half (56%) of the over 2,000 recorded public health incidents in Africa between 2001 and 2021 were connected to climate change. Resource scarcity contributes to displacement and conflict, particularly in fragile regions. Urban areas, often characterized by informal settlements, face heightened risks from flooding and extreme heat.

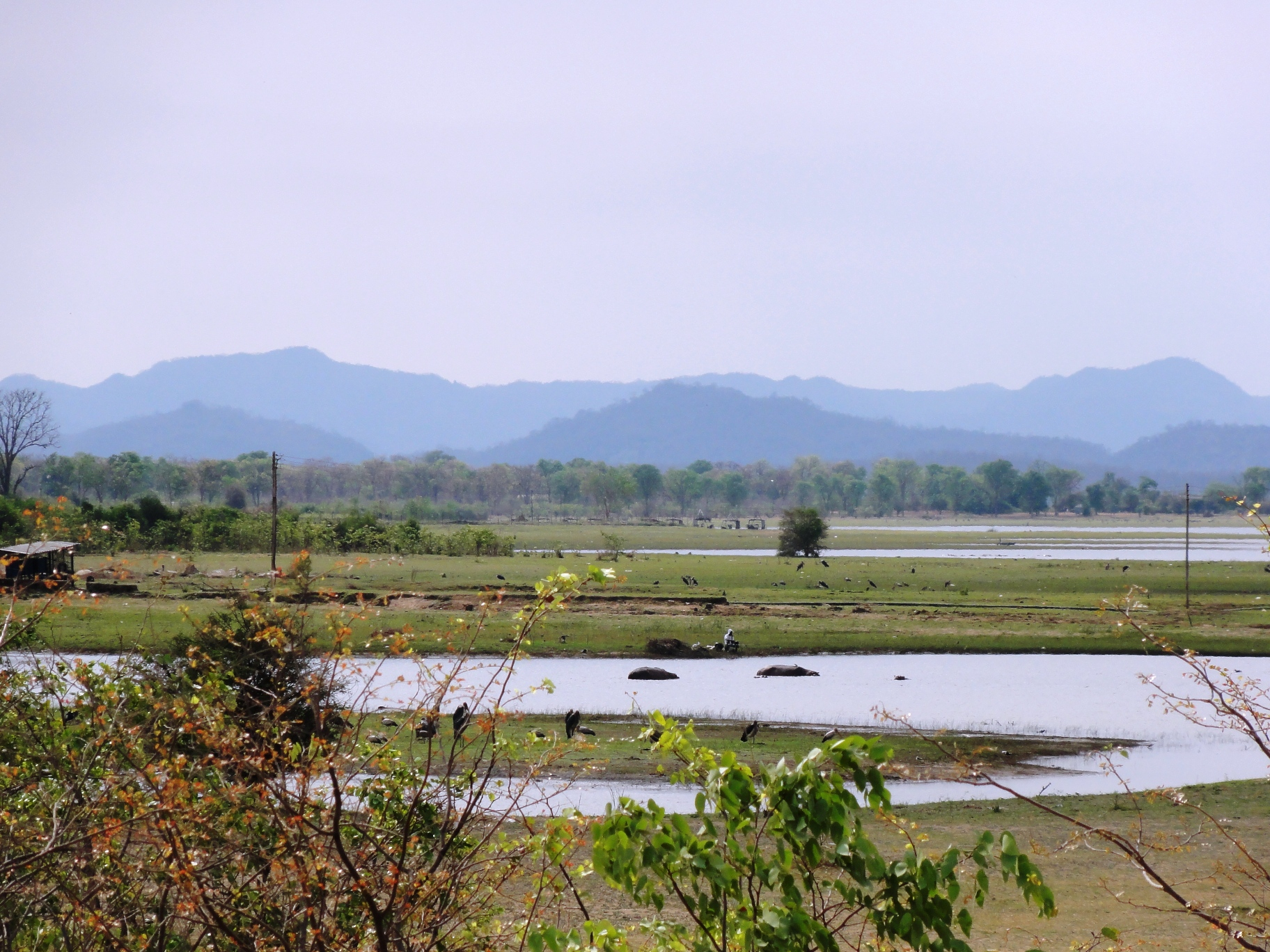
Lake kariba

=== Ecology and biodiversity ===
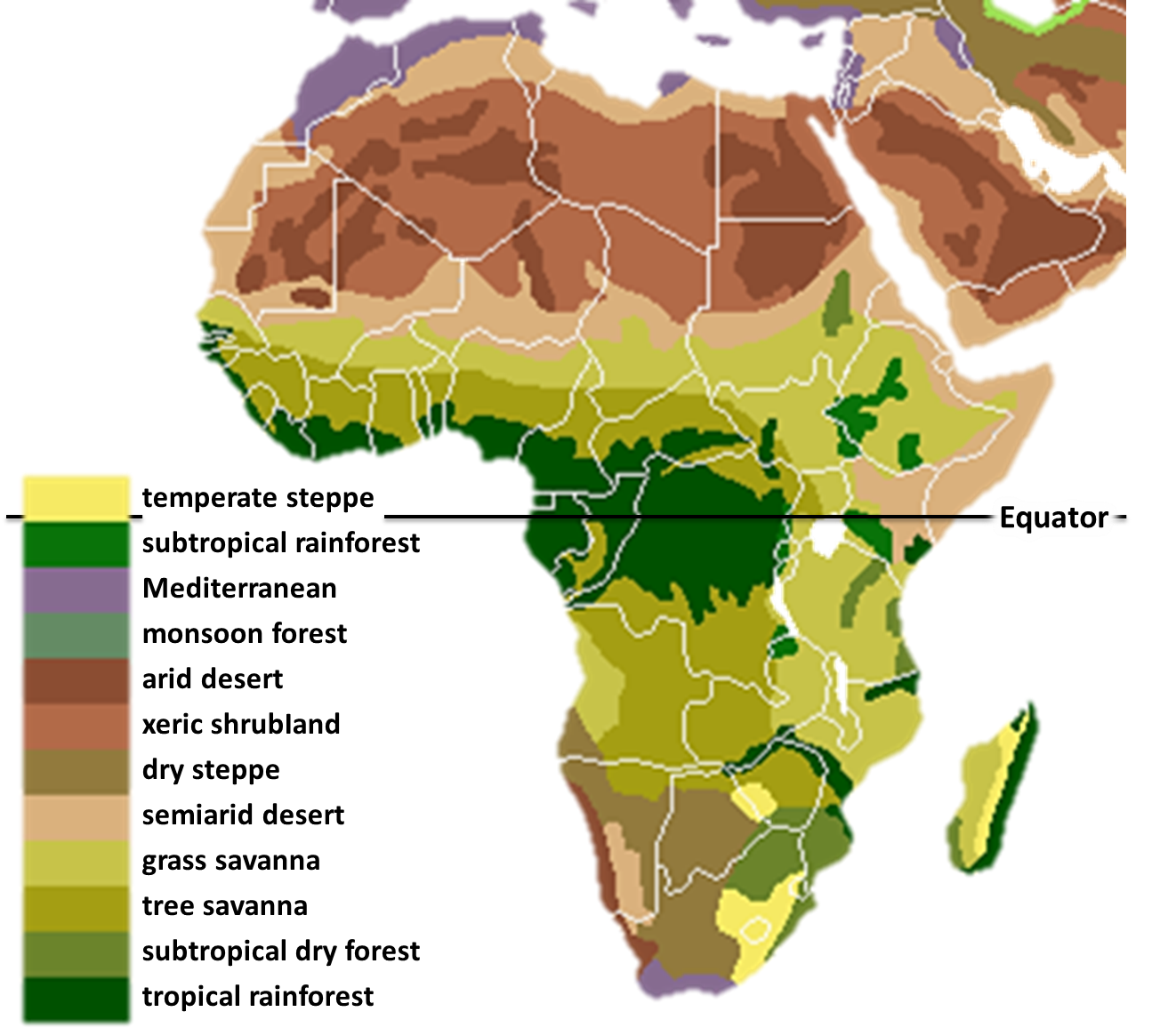
The main biomes in Africa

Africa has over 3,000 protected areas, with 198 marine protected areas, 50 biosphere reserves, and 80 wetland reserves. Significant habitat destruction, increases in human population, and poaching are reducing biological diversity and arable land. Human encroachment, civil unrest and the introduction of non-native species threaten biodiversity. This has been exacerbated by administrative problems, inadequate personnel and funding problems.

Deforestation is affecting Africa at twice the world rate, according to the United Nations Environment Programme. The deforestation rate of 4.08 million hectares per year in 2000–2015 declined to 3.45 million hectares per year in 2015–2025. According to the University of Pennsylvania African Studies Center, 31% of pasture lands and 19% of forests and woodlands are classified as degraded, and the deforestation rate is twice the average for the rest of the world. Some sources claim that approximately 90% of the original, virgin forests in West Africa have been destroyed. Over 90% of Madagascar's original forests have been destroyed since the arrival of humans 2,000 years ago. About 65% of agricultural land suffers from soil degradation.

=== Fauna ===
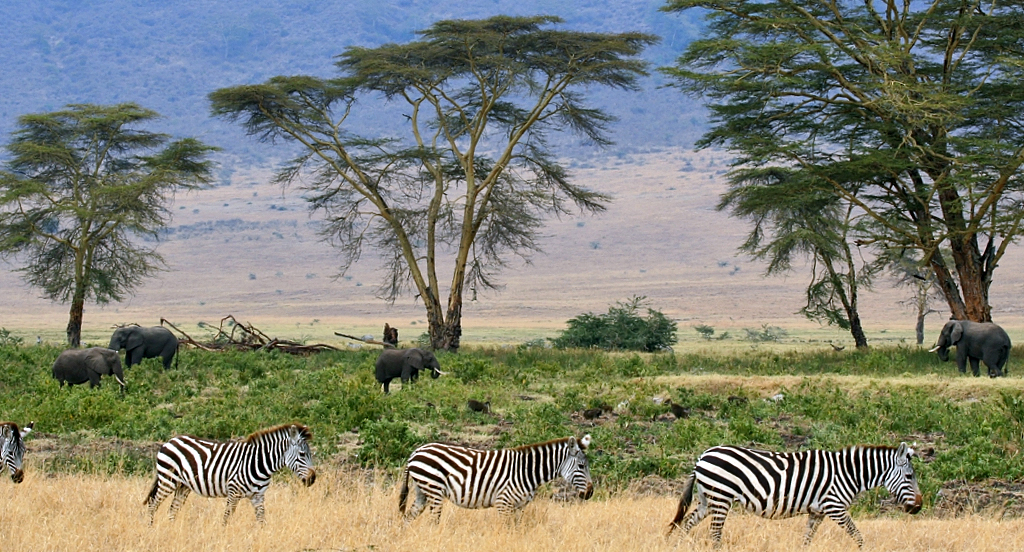
The savanna of the Ngorongoro Conservation Area in Tanzania

Africa boasts perhaps the world's largest combination of density and "range of freedom" of wild animal populations and diversity, with wild populations of large carnivores (such as lions, hyenas, and cheetahs) and herbivores (such as buffalo, elephants, camels, and giraffes) ranging freely on primarily open non-private plains. It is also home to a variety of "jungle" animals, including snakes, primates and aquatic life such as crocodiles and amphibians. Africa has the largest number of megafauna species, as it was least affected by the extinction of the Pleistocene megafauna.

=== Environmental issues ===
African environmental problems are problems caused by the direct and indirect human impacts on the natural environment and affect humans and nearly all forms of life in Africa. Issues include deforestation, soil degradation, air pollution, water pollution, coastal erosion, garbage pollution, climate change, Oil spills, Biodiversity loss, and water scarcity (resulting in problems with access to safe water supply and sanitation). These issues result in environmental conflict and are connected to broader social struggles for democracy and sovereignty. The scarcity of climate adaptation techniques in Africa makes it the least resilient continent to climate change.

== Politics ==
=== African Union ===
Regions of the African Union: Northern Western Southern Eastern Central

Democracy in Africa according to the 2026 V-Dem Electoral Democracy Index

The African Union (AU) is a continental union consisting of 55 member states. The union was formed with Addis Ababa as its headquarters in 2001 as a successor to the Organisation of African Unity. The Pan-African Parliament (PAP) is located in Midrand, South Africa.

The African Union, not to be confused with the AU Commission, is formed by the Constitutive Act of the African Union, which aims to transform the African Economic Community, a federated commonwealth, into a state under established international conventions. The Assembly of the African Union consists of legislative, judicial and executive organs. It is led by the African Union president and head of state, who is also the president of PAP. The president is elected by PAP. The powers and authority of the president of the Assembly derive from the Constitutive Act and the Protocol of the Pan-African Parliament, as well as the inheritance of presidential authority stipulated by African treaties and by international treaties. The government consists of all-union, regional, state, and municipal authorities, as well as hundreds of institutions, that together manage the day-to-day affairs of the institution.

Extensive human rights abuses still occur in several parts of Africa, often under the oversight of the state. Most of such violations occur for political reasons, often as a side effect of civil war. Countries where major human rights violations have been reported in recent times include the Democratic Republic of the Congo, Sierra Leone, Liberia, Sudan, Zimbabwe, and Ivory Coast.

=== Boundary conflicts ===
African nations have made great efforts to respect international borders as inviolable for a long time. For example, the Organization of African Unity (OAU), which was established in 1963 and replaced by the African Union in 2002, set respect for the territorial integrity of each country as one of its principles in the OAU Charter. Indeed, compared with the formation of European countries, there have been fewer international conflicts in Africa over changing the borders, which has influenced country formation there and has enabled some countries to survive that might have been defeated and absorbed by others. Yet international conflicts have played out through support for proxy armies or rebel movements. Many states have experienced civil wars, including Rwanda, Sudan, Angola, Sierra Leone, Congo, Liberia, Ethiopia and Somalia. Wars of national liberation also often took up a Marxist, Marxist–Leninist, or Maoist character in ideological terms, where the independence of African nations was raised in Marxian terms. Early examples included the Union of the Peoples of Cameroon armed movement against French colonialism, a Marxist–Leninist insurgency, followed by similar movements in Congo (the Simba Rebellion). Che Guevara participated in the latter, and opined in 1967 that Africa was not ready for revolution. Despite this, in Zanzibar before and after unification with Tanzania, forms of socialism took hold. In Sudan under Gaafar Nimeiry, in Somalia under Siad Barre, in Ethiopia under the Dergue and Mengistu Haile Mariam, in Congo-Brazzaville under various administrations from the 1960s onwards, including that of Denis Sassou-Nguesso, in Benin under Mathieu Kérékou, in the Seychelles under France-Albert René, in Angola, Mozambique and Guinea-Bissau before Portugal's 1974 Carnation Revolution, Marxism–Leninism was fashionable. Even after 1990, there are some examples of Military Marxism, such as a militia established by Ernest Wamba-dia-Wamba in Eastern Congo in the 1990s.

== List of states and territories ==

The countries in this table are categorised according to the scheme for geographic subregions used by the United Nations, and data included are per sources in cross-referenced articles. Where they differ, provisos are clearly indicated.

Arms	Flag	Name of region (Note: Continental regions as per UN categorizations/map) and territory, with flag	Area (km^{2})	Population	Year	Density (per km^{2})	Capital	Name(s) in official language(s)	ISO 3166-1
North Africa
	(Algeria)	Algeria	2,381,740	46,731,000	2022	18	Algiers	الجزائر (al-Jazāʾir)/Algérie	DZA
	(Egypt)	Egypt (Note: Egypt is generally considered a transcontinental country in Northern Africa (UN region) and Western Asia; population and area figures are for the African portion only, west of the Suez Canal.)	1,001,450	82,868,000	2012	83	Cairo	مِصر (Miṣr)	EGY
	(Libya)	Libya	1,759,540	6,310,434	2009	4	Tripoli	ليبيا (Lībiyā)	LBY
Morocco	(Morocco)	Morocco	446,550	35,740,000	2017	78	Rabat	المغرب (al-maḡrib)/ⵍⵎⵖⵔⵉⴱ (lmeɣrib)/Maroc	MAR
	(Sudan)	Sudan	1,861,484	30,894,000	2008	17	Khartoum	Sudan/السودان (as-Sūdān)	SDN
	(Tunisia)	Tunisia	163,610	10,486,339	2009	64	Tunis	تونس (Tūnis)/Tunest/Tunisie	TUN
		Western Sahara (Note: The territory of Western Sahara is claimed by the Sahrawi Arab Democratic Republic and Morocco. The SADR is recognised as a sovereign state by the African Union. Morocco claims the entirety of the country as its Southern Provinces. Morocco administers 4/5 of the territory while the SADR controls 1/5. Morocco's annexation of this territory has not been recognised internationally.)	266,000	405,210	2009	2	El Aaiún	الصحراء الغربية (aṣ-Ṣaḥrā' al-Gharbiyyah)/Taneẓroft Tutrimt/Sáhara Occidental	ESH
East Africa
	(Burundi)	Burundi	27,830	8,988,091	2009	323	Gitega	Uburundi/Burundi/Burundi	BDI
	(Comoros)	Comoros	2,170	752,438	2009	347	Moroni	Komori/Comores/جزر القمر (Juzur al-Qumur)	COM
	(Djibouti)	Djibouti	23,000	828,324	2015	22	Djibouti	Yibuuti/جيبوتي (Jībūtī)/Djibouti/Jabuuti	DJI
	(Eritrea)	Eritrea	121,320	5,647,168	2009	47	Asmara	Eritrea	ERI
Ethiopia	(Ethiopia)	Ethiopia	1,127,127	84,320,987	2012	75	Addis Ababa	ኢትዮጵያ (Ītyōṗṗyā)/Itiyoophiyaa/ኢትዮጵያ/Itoophiyaa/Itoobiya/ኢትዮጵያ	ETH
	(French Southern and Antarctic Lands)	French Southern Territories (France)	439,781	100	2019	—	Saint Pierre	Terres australes et antarctiques françaises	FRA-TF
Kenya	(Kenya)	Kenya	582,650	39,002,772	2009	66	Nairobi	Kenya	KEN
	(Madagascar)	Madagascar	587,040	20,653,556	2009	35	Antananarivo	Madagasikara/Madagascar	MDG
Malawi	(Malawi)	Malawi	118,480	14,268,711	2009	120	Lilongwe	Malaŵi/Malaŵi	MWI
Mauritius	(Mauritius)	Mauritius	2,040	1,284,264	2009	630	Port Louis	Mauritius/Maurice/Moris	MUS
Mayotte	(Mayotte)	Mayotte (France)	374	223,765	2009	490	Mamoudzou	Mayotte/Maore/Maiôty	MYT
	(Mozambique)	Mozambique	801,590	21,669,278	2009	27	Maputo	Moçambique/Mozambiki/Msumbiji/Muzambhiki	MOZ
Réunion	(Réunion)	Réunion (France)	2,512	743,981	2002	296	Saint Denis	La Réunion	FRA-RE
Rwanda	(Rwanda)	Rwanda	26,338	10,473,282	2009	398	Kigali	Rwanda	RWA
Seychelles	(Seychelles)	Seychelles	455	87,476	2009	192	Victoria	Seychelles/Sesel	SYC
Somalia	(Somalia)	Somalia	637,657	9,832,017	2009	15	Mogadishu	𐒈𐒝𐒑𐒛𐒐𐒘𐒕𐒖 (Soomaaliya) /الصومال (aṣ-Ṣūmāl)	SOM
	(Somaliland)	Somaliland	176,120	5,708,180	2021	25	Hargeisa	Soomaaliland/صوماليلاند (Ṣūmālīlānd)	
	(South Sudan)	South Sudan	619,745	8,260,490	2008	13	Juba	South Sudan	SSD
Tanzania	(Tanzania)	Tanzania	945,087	44,929,002	2009	43	Dodoma	Tanzania/Tanzania	TZA
Uganda	(Uganda)	Uganda	236,040	32,369,558	2009	137	Kampala	Uganda/Yuganda	UGA
Zambia	(Zambia)	Zambia	752,614	11,862,740	2009	16	Lusaka	Zambia	ZMB
Zimbabwe	(Zimbabwe)	Zimbabwe	390,580	11,392,629	2009	29	Harare	Zimbabwe	ZWE
Central Africa
	(Angola)	Angola	1,246,700	12,799,293	2009	10	Luanda	Angola	AGO
Cameroon	(Cameroon)	Cameroon	475,440	18,879,301	2009	40	Yaoundé	Cameroun/Kamerun	CMR
Central African Republic	(Central African Republic)	Central African Republic	622,984	4,511,488	2009	7	Bangui	Ködörösêse tî Bêafrîka/République centrafricaine	CAF
Chad	(Chad)	Chad	1,284,000	10,329,208	2009	8	N'Djamena	تشاد (Tšād)/Tchad	TCD
Republic of the Congo	(Republic of the Congo)	Republic of the Congo	342,000	4,012,809	2009	12	Brazzaville	Congo/Kôngo/Kongó	COG
Democratic Republic of the Congo	(Democratic Republic of the Congo)	Democratic Republic of the Congo	2,345,410	69,575,000	2012	30	Kinshasa	République démocratique du Congo	COD
Equatorial Guinea	(Equatorial Guinea)	Equatorial Guinea	28,051	633,441	2009	23	Ciudad de la Paz	Guinea Ecuatorial/Guinée Équatoriale/Guiné Equatorial	GNQ
Gabon	(Gabon)	Gabon	267,667	1,514,993	2009	6	Libreville	Gabon	GAB
	(São Tomé and Príncipe)	São Tomé and Príncipe	1,001	212,679	2009	212	São Tomé	São Tomé e Príncipe	STP
Southern Africa
	(Botswana)	Botswana	600,370	1,990,876	2009	3	Gaborone	Botswana/Botswana	BWA
Eswatini	(Eswatini)	Eswatini	17,363	1,123,913	2009	65	Mbabane	eSwatini/Eswatini	SWZ
	(Lesotho)	Lesotho	30,355	2,130,819	2009	70	Maseru	Lesotho/Lesotho	LSO
Namibia	(Namibia)	Namibia	825,418	2,108,665	2009	3	Windhoek	Namibia	NAM
	(South Africa)	South Africa	1,219,912	51,770,560	2011	42	Bloemfontein, Cape Town, Pretoria (Note: Bloemfontein is the judicial capital of South Africa, while Cape Town is its legislative seat, and Pretoria is the country's administrative seat.)	yaseNingizimu Afrika/yoMzantsi-Afrika/Suid-Afrika/Afrika-Borwa/Aforika Borwa/Afrika Borwa/Afrika Dzonga/yeNingizimu Afrika/Afurika Tshipembe/yeSewula Afrika	ZAF
West Africa
Benin	(Benin)	Benin	112,620	8,791,832	2009	78	Porto-Novo	Bénin	BEN
Burkina Faso	(Burkina Faso)	Burkina Faso	274,200	15,746,232	2009	57	Ouagadougou	Burkina Faso	BFA
	(Cape Verde)	Cape Verde	4,033	429,474	2009	107	Praia	Cabo Verde/Kabu Verdi	CPV
The Gambia	(The Gambia)	The Gambia	11,300	1,782,893	2009	158	Banjul	The Gambia	GMB
Ghana	(Ghana)	Ghana	239,460	23,832,495	2009	100	Accra	Ghana	GHA
	(Guinea)	Guinea	245,857	10,057,975	2009	41	Conakry	Guinée	GIN
Guinea-Bissau	(Guinea-Bissau)	Guinea-Bissau	36,120	1,533,964	2009	43	Bissau	Guiné-Bissau	GNB
Ivory Coast	(Ivory Coast)	Ivory Coast	322,460	20,617,068	2009	64	Abidjan, (Note: Yamoussoukro is the official capital of Ivory Coast, while Abidjan is the de facto seat.) Yamoussoukro	Côte d'Ivoire	CIV
Liberia	(Liberia)	Liberia	111,370	3,441,790	2009	31	Monrovia	Liberia	LBR
Mali	(Mali)	Mali	1,240,000	12,666,987	2009	10	Bamako	Mali/Maali/مالي (Mālī)/𞤃𞤢𞥄𞤤𞤭 (Maali)/ߡߊߟߌ (Mali)	MLI
	(Mauritania)	Mauritania	1,030,700	3,129,486	2009	3	Nouakchott	موريتانيا (Mūrītānyā)	MRT
	(Niger)	Niger	1,267,000	15,306,252	2009	12	Niamey	Niger	NER
Nigeria	(Nigeria)	Nigeria	923,768	166,629,000	2012	180	Abuja	Nigeria	NGA
United Kingdom	(Saint Helena, Ascension and Tristan da Cunha)	Saint Helena, Ascension and Tristan da Cunha (United Kingdom)	420	7,728	2012	13	Jamestown	Saint Helena, Ascension and Tristan da Cunha	SHN
Senegal	(Senegal)	Senegal	196,190	13,711,597	2009	70	Dakar	Sénégal	SEN
Sierra Leone	(Sierra Leone)	Sierra Leone	71,740	6,440,053	2009	90	Freetown	Sierra Leone	SLE
Togo	(Togo)	Togo	56,785	6,019,877	2009	106	Lomé	Togo	TGO
Africa Total			30,368,609	1,001,320,281	2009	33			

=== Other territories ===
This list contains nine territories that are administered as incorporated areas of a primarily non-African country but that belong geographically to the African continent.

Flag	Map	English short, formal names, and ISO	Ruling power	Status	Domestic short name(s) and formal name(s)	Capital	Population	Area	Currency
		Canary Islands Autonomous Region of the Canary Islands ES-CN	Spain	Autonomous community of Spain	Spanish: Islas Canarias	Santa Cruz and Las Palmas Spanish: Santa Cruz de Tenerife and Las Palmas de Gran Canaria	2,207,225	7,447 km^{2} (2,875 sq mi)	euro
		Ceuta Autonomous City of Ceuta ES-CE	Spain	Autonomous city of Spain	Spanish: Ceuta - Ciudad autónoma de Ceuta	Ceuta Spanish: Ceuta	84,843	28 km^{2} (11 sq mi)	euro
		Madeira Autonomous Region of Madeira PT-30	Portugal	Autonomous Region of Portugal	Portuguese: Madeira - Região Autónoma da Madeira	Funchal Portuguese: Funchal	267,785	828 km^{2} (320 sq mi)	euro
		Mayotte Mayotte Region YT	France	Overseas region and constituent part of the French Republic	French: Mayotte - Région Mayotte	Mamoudzou French: Mamoudzou	266,380	374 km^{2} (144 sq mi)	euro
		Melilla Autonomous City of Melilla ES-ML	Spain	Autonomous city of Spain	Spanish: Melilla - Ciudad autónoma de Melilla	Melilla Spanish: Melilla	84,714	20 km^{2} (8 sq mi)	euro
		Pelagian Islands	Italy	Archipelago of Italy	Italian: Isole Pelagie Sicilian: Ìsuli Pilaggî	Lampedusa e Linosa (Note: Geographically, part of the archipelago (Lampedusa and Lampione) belongs to the African continent; politically and administratively, the islands fall within the Province of Agrigento in Sicily.) Italian: Lampedusa e Linosa Sicilian: Lampidusa e Linusa	6,304	21.4 km^{2} (8 sq mi)	euro
		Plazas de soberanía	Spain	Overseas territory of Spain	Spanish: Plazas de soberanía	N/A	74	0.59 km^{2} (0.23 sq mi)	euro
		Réunion Réunion Region RE	France	Overseas region and constituent part of the French Republic	French: Réunion - Région Réunion	Saint-Denis French: Saint-Denis	889,918	2,512 km^{2} (970 sq mi)	euro
		Socotra Archipelago	Yemen	Governorate of Yemen	Arabic: أرخبيل سقطرى (ʾArḫabīl Suquṭrā)	Hadibu Arabic: اديبو (Ḥādībū)	60,550	3,974.64 km^{2} (1,535 sq mi)	Yemeni rial

== Economy ==
Map of the African Economic Community CEN-SAD COMESA EAC ECCAS ECOWAS IGAD SADC UMA

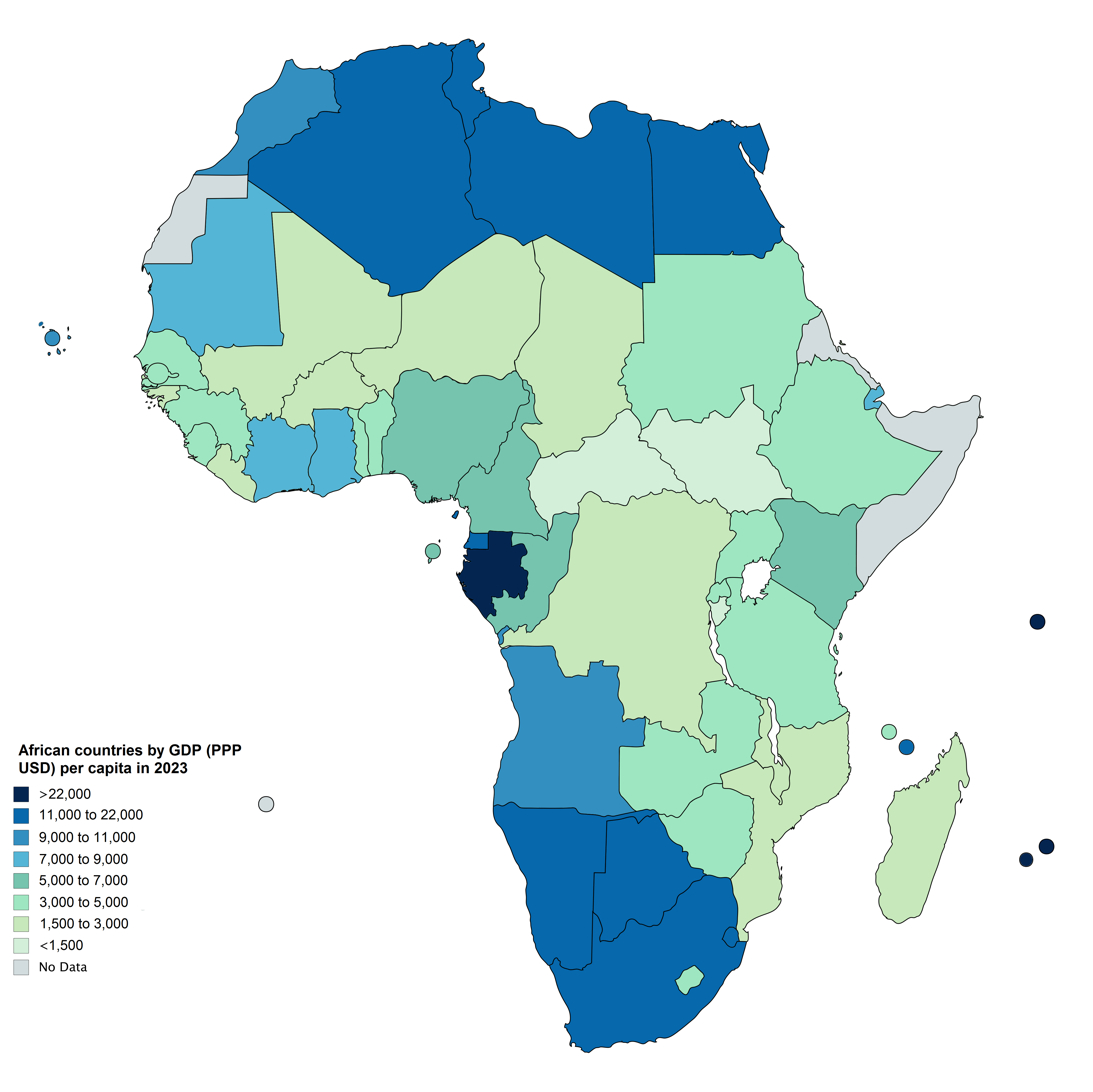
African countries by GDP (PPP) per capita in 2023

Although it has abundant natural resources, Africa remains the world's poorest and least-developed continent (other than Antarctica), the result of a variety of causes that may include corrupt governments that have often committed serious human rights violations, failed central planning, high levels of illiteracy, low self-esteem, lack of access to foreign capital, legacies of colonialism, the slave trade, the Cold War, and frequent tribal and military conflict (ranging from guerrilla warfare to genocide). The continent's total nominal GDP remains behind that of several individual countries, including the United States, China, Japan, Germany, the United Kingdom, India and France. According to the United Nations' Human Development Report in 2003, the bottom 24 ranked nations (151st to 175th) were all African.

Poverty, illiteracy, malnutrition, inadequate water supply and sanitation, and poor health affect a large proportion of the people. A 2008 World Bank study estimates 81% of the sub-Saharan African population were living on less than $2.50 (PPP) per day in 2005, compared with 86% for India. Sub-Saharan Africa is the least successful region of the world in reducing poverty; some 50% of the population were living in poverty in 1981 (200 million people), a figure that rose to 58% in 1996 before dropping to 50% in 2005 (380 million people). The average poor person in sub-Saharan Africa is estimated to live on only 70 cents per day and was poorer in 2003 than in 1973, indicating increasing poverty in some areas. Some of it is attributed to unsuccessful economic liberalisation programmes spearheaded by foreign companies and governments, but other studies cite bad domestic government policies more than external factors.

The last debt crisis in 2005 was resolved with help from the heavily indebted poor countries scheme, which resulted in some positive and negative effects on the economy in Africa. About 10 years after the 2005 debt crisis in sub-Saharan Africa was resolved, Zambia fell back into debt. One reason was the fall in copper prices in 2011, but the bigger reason was that a large amount of the money Zambia borrowed was wasted or pocketed by the elite.

From 1995 to 2005, Africa's rate of economic growth increased, averaging 5% in 2005. Some countries experienced even higher growth rates, notably Angola, Sudan and Equatorial Guinea, all of which had increased oil production.

The following table shows the projected nominal GDP and GDP per capita (at purchasing power parity) in 2026 by the IMF.

Rank	Country	GDP (nominal, in 2026) millions of USD	GDP per capita (PPP, in 2026) in international dollars
—	African Union	3,654,354	8,416
1	South Africa	489,083	16,841
2	Egypt	442,886	23,624
3	Nigeria	386,671	10,051
4	Algeria	331,894	19,719
5	Morocco	195,632	12,425
6	Angola	157,297	10,713
7	Kenya	151,151	8,036
8	Ghana	128,638	9,242
9	Ethiopia	127,145	4,996
10	DR Congo	122,281	2,138

The continent is believed to hold 90% of the world's cobalt, 90% of its platinum, 50% of its gold, 98% of its chromium, 70% of its tantalite, 64% of its manganese and one-third of its uranium. The DRC has 70% of the world's coltan, a mineral used in the production of tantalum capacitors for electronic devices such as cell phones. The DRC also has more than 30% of the world's diamond reserves. Guinea is the world's largest exporter of bauxite. As growth in Africa has been driven mainly by services and not manufacturing or agriculture, it has been growth without jobs and without reduction in poverty levels. In fact, the food security crisis of 2008 (which took place following the global financial crisis) pushed 100 million people into food insecurity. In 2024, nearly 307 million people were undernourished (46% of the global total), an increase of 10 million people since 2023 and 34 million from 2022.

China has built increasingly stronger ties with African nations and is Africa's largest trading partner. In 2007, Chinese companies invested a total of US$1 billion in Africa.

A Harvard University study led by researcher Calestous Juma shows that Africa could feed itself by making the transition from importer to self-sufficiency. "African agriculture is at the crossroads; we have come to the end of a century of policies that favoured Africa's export of raw materials and importation of food. Africa is starting to focus on agricultural innovation as its new engine for regional trade and prosperity."

=== Energy ===
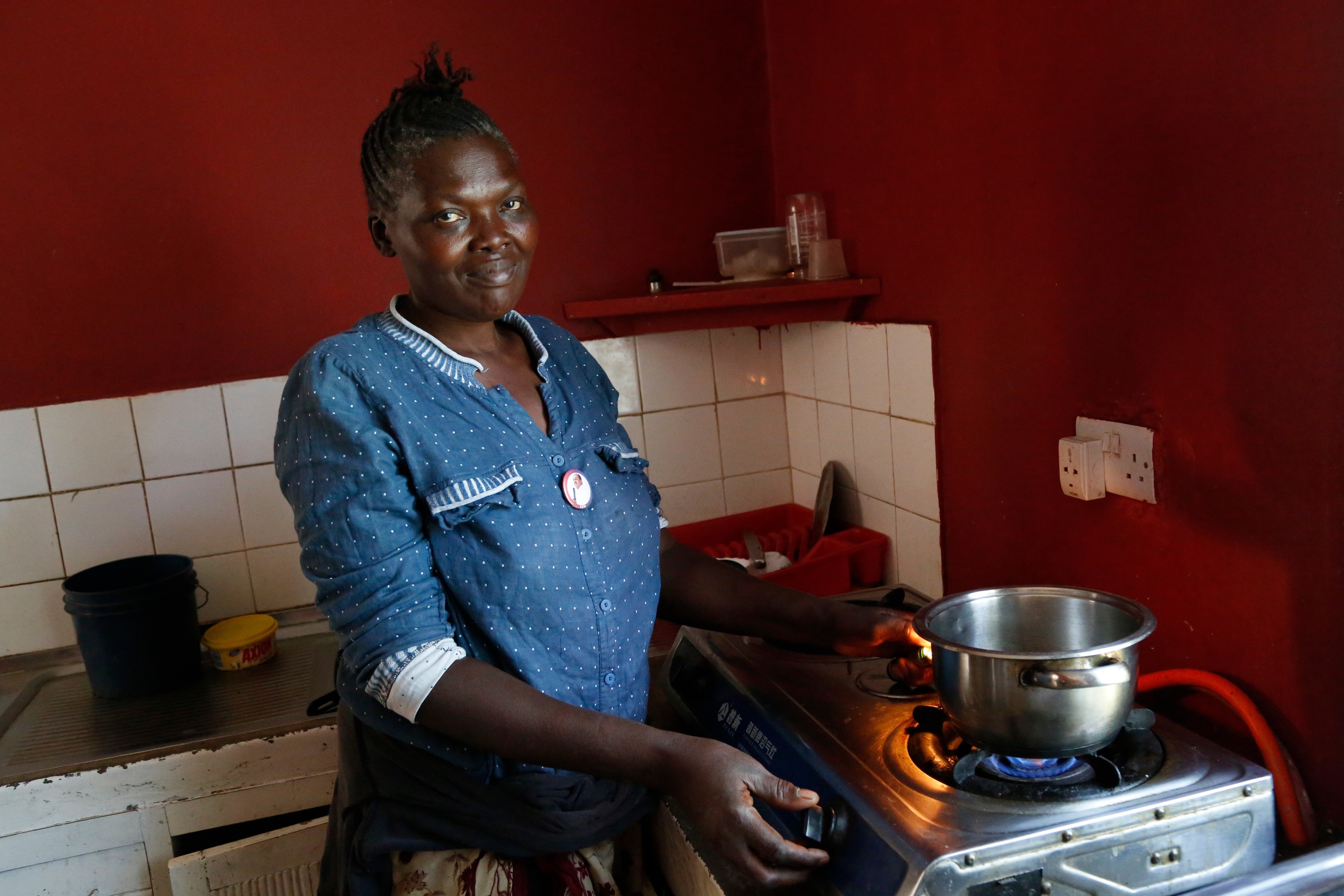
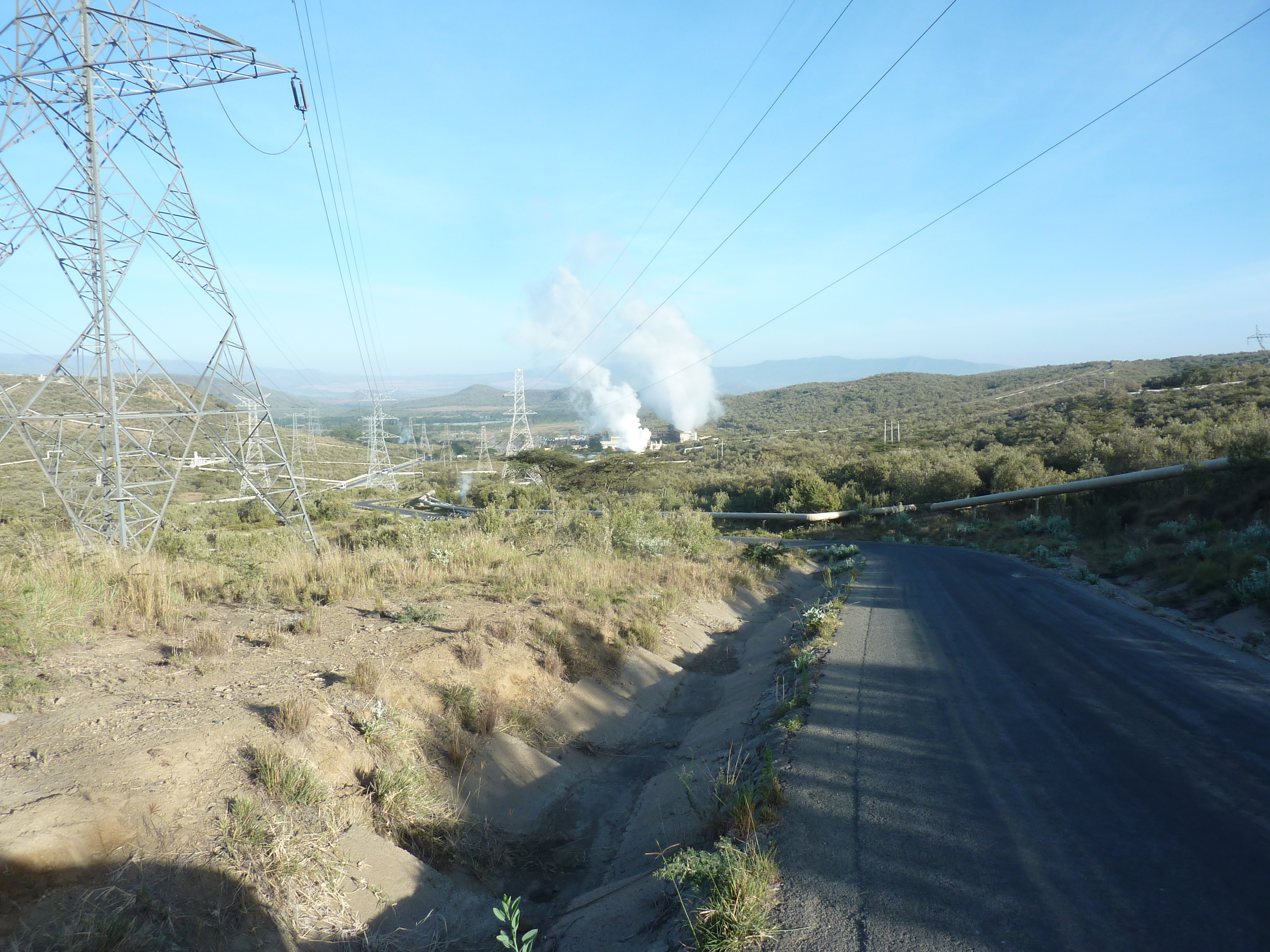
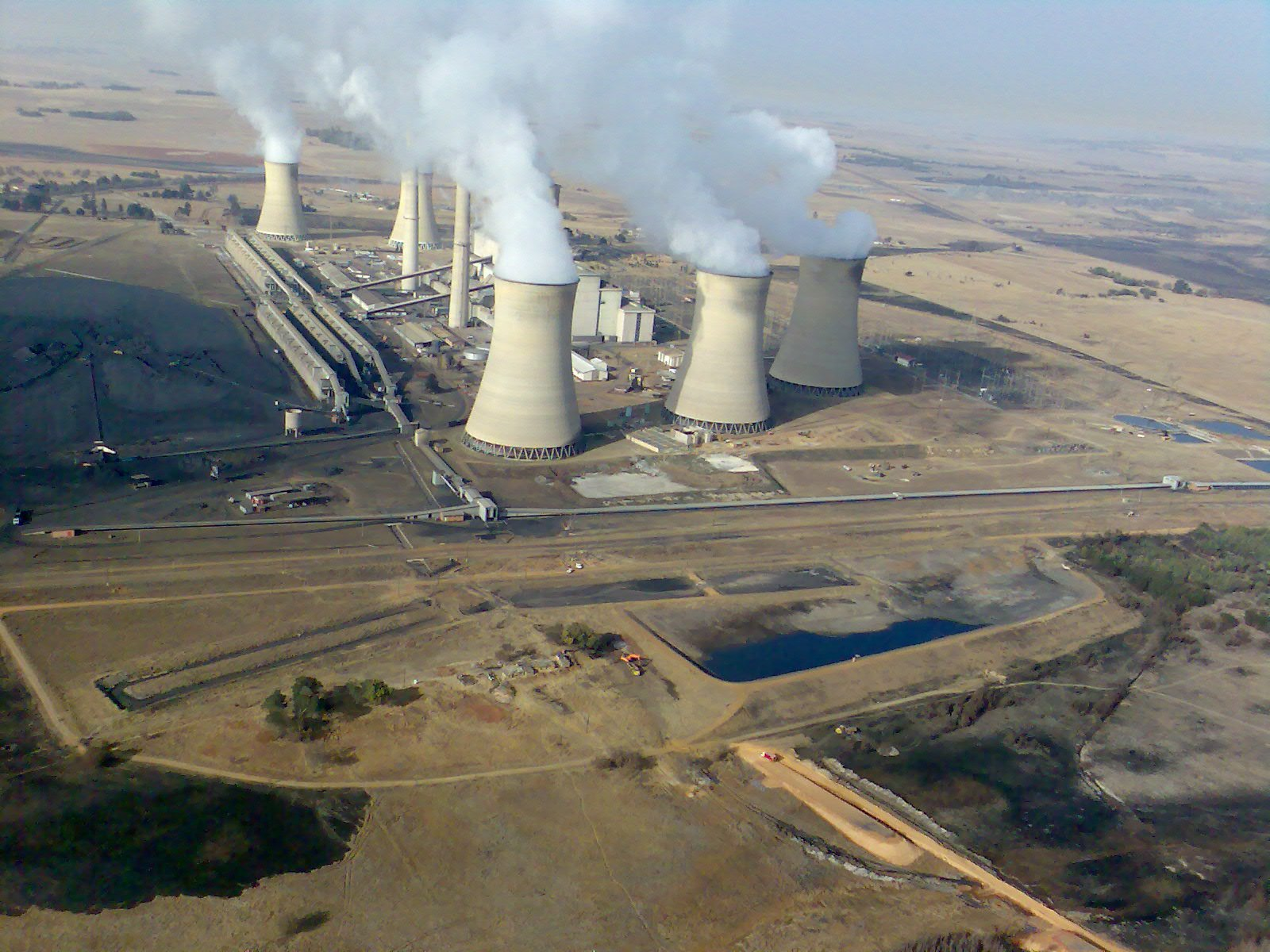
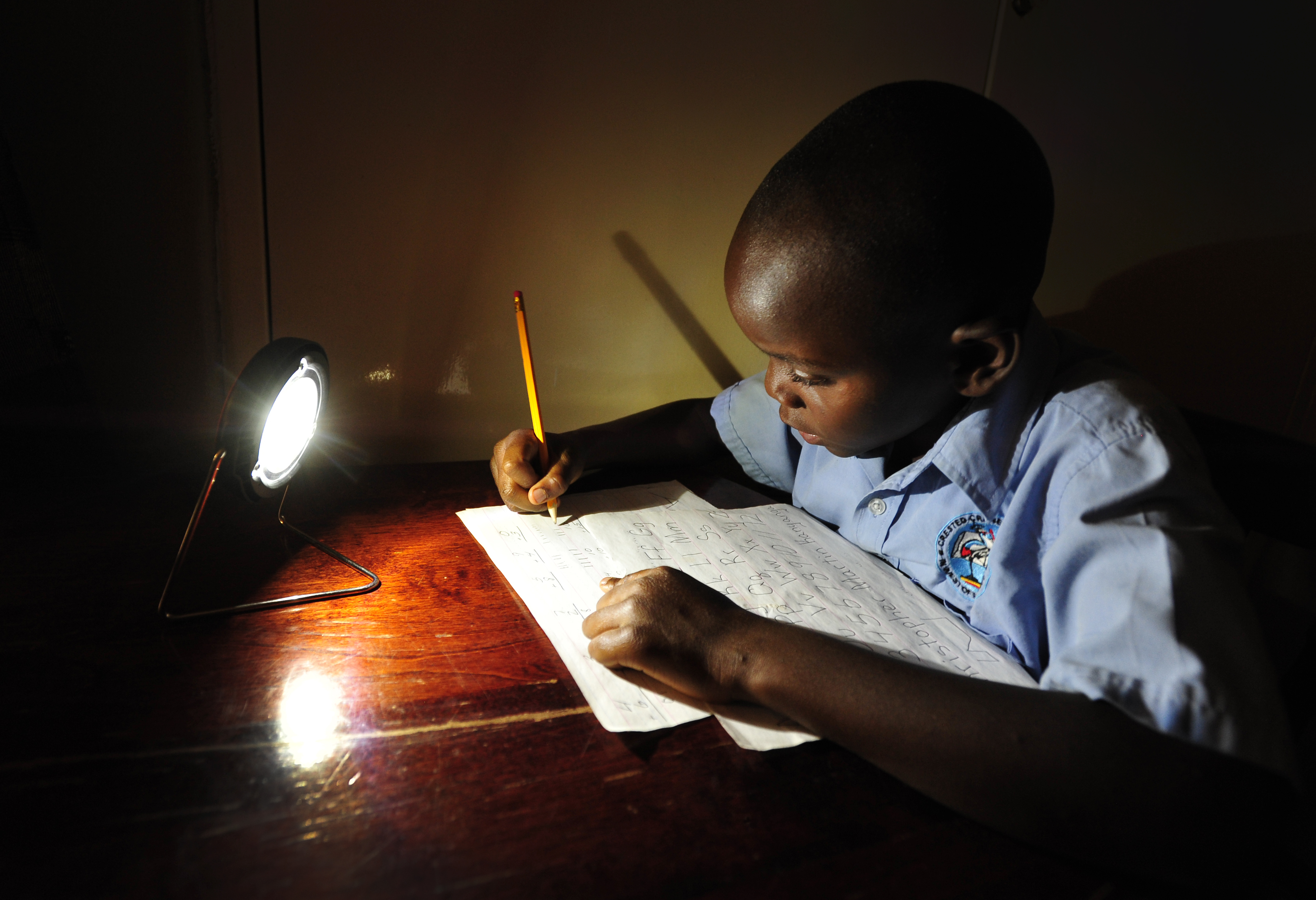
Cooking with biogas in Tanzania; Geothermal energy infrastructure in Kenya; Coal power station in South Africa; Solar-powered lamp-light in Zambia.

Energy in Africa is characterised by low per-capita consumption and limited access to modern energy services, reflecting both infrastructural and socio-economic challenges across the continent. As of 2023, Africa accounted for just 5.5% of global total final energy consumption, with per-capita energy use more than three times lower than the global average. The energy mix is dominated by biofuels and waste, which make up 43% of total final consumption, primarily for household cooking and heating, followed by oil products at 33%, electricity at 11%, natural gas at 9%, and coal at 4%.

Electricity access remains a major challenge, particularly in Sub-Saharan Africa, where nearly 450 million rural residents lack reliable electricity, and grid coverage is often inconsistent. Clean cooking solutions are similarly underdeveloped, leaving over 900 million people reliant on polluting fuels such as firewood, charcoal, and agricultural residues, which disproportionately affect women and children. Transport energy is dominated by oil products, reflecting low motorisation rates and limited adoption of electric mobility, although countries such as Ethiopia, Morocco, and Egypt have begun adopting policies to reduce fossil fuel dependency.

Africa possesses some of the world's most abundant energy resources, including oil, natural gas, coal, hydropower, solar, wind, geothermal, and biomass, much of which remains underutilised. While fossil fuels such as coal, oil, and natural gas continue to dominate energy production and electricity generation in Africa, renewable sources are increasingly expanding across the continent. Hydropower, solar, wind, geothermal, and modern biomass are growing in capacity, though their deployment remains uneven and limited compared to the continent's vast potential. Hydropower is the largest non-combustible renewable source, while solar energy offers immense potential due to high irradiation levels, particularly in the Sahara and Sahel.

There are regional differences: North Africa is dominated by oil and gas production, Southern Africa by coal and hydropower, East Africa by hydropower and geothermal, and West and Central Africa face major electrification gaps despite hydroelectric potential.

=== Infrastructure ===
==== Water resources ====
Water development and management are complex due to the multiplicity of trans-boundary water resources (rivers, lakes and aquifers). Around 75% of sub-Saharan Africa falls within 53 international river basin catchments that traverse multiple borders. This particular constraint can also be converted into an opportunity if the potential for trans-boundary cooperation is harnessed in the development of the area's water resources. A multi-sectoral analysis of the Zambezi River, for example, shows that riparian cooperation could lead to a 23% increase in firm energy production without any additional investments. Several institutional and legal frameworks for transboundary cooperation exist, such as the Zambezi River Authority, the Southern African Development Community protocol, Volta River Authority and the Nile Basin Commission. However, additional efforts are required to further develop political will as well as the financial capacities and institutional frameworks needed for multilateral cooperative actions and optimal solutions for all riparians.

== Demographics ==
Proportion of total African population by country
1. Nigeria (15.4%)
2. Ethiopia (8.37%)
3. Egypt (7.65%)
4. Democratic Republic of the Congo (6.57%)
5. Tanzania (4.55%)
6. South Africa (4.47%)
7. Kenya (3.88%)
8. Uganda (3.38%)
9. Algeria (3.36%)
10. Other (42.4%)

Africa is considered by anthropologists to be the most genetically diverse continent as a result of having been inhabited the longest. The population has rapidly increased over the last 40 years and is consequently relatively young. In some states, more than half the population is under 25 years of age. The population increased from 229 million in 1950 to 630 million in 1990. As of 2021, the population is estimated at 1,394 million. Africa's total population surpassing other continents is fairly recent; the population surpassed Europe in the 1990s, while the Americas were overtaken sometime around 2000. This increase in the number of babies born in Africa compared to the rest of the world is expected to reach approximately 37% in the year 2050, while in 1990 sub-Saharan Africa accounted for only 16% of the world's births.

The total fertility rate (children per woman) for sub-Saharan Africa is 4.7 as of 2018, the highest in the world. All countries in sub-Saharan Africa had rates above replacement level in 2019 and accounted for 27.1% of global live births. In 2021, sub-Saharan Africa accounted for 29% of global births.

Speakers of Bantu languages (part of the Niger–Congo family) are the majority in southern, central and southeast Africa. The Bantu-speaking peoples from the Sahel progressively expanded over most of sub-Saharan Africa. But there are also several Nilotic groups in South Sudan and East Africa, the mixed Swahili people on the Swahili coast, and a few remaining indigenous Khoisan and Pygmy peoples in Southern and Central Africa, respectively. Bantu speakers predominate in Gabon and Equatorial Guinea and are found in parts of southern Cameroon. In the Kalahari Desert, the distinct people known as the Bushmen (also "San", closely related to but distinct from Khoekhoe) have long been present. The San are physically distinct from other Africans and are the indigenous people of southern Africa. Pygmies are the pre-Bantu indigenous peoples of Central Africa.

The peoples of West Africa primarily speak Niger–Congo languages, belonging mostly to its non-Bantu branches, though some Nilo-Saharan and Afroasiatic-speaking groups are also found. The Niger–Congo-speaking Yoruba, Igbo, Fulani, Akan, and Wolof ethnic groups are the largest and most influential. In the central Sahara, Mandinka or Mande groups are most significant. Chadic-speaking groups, including the Hausa, are found in more northerly parts of the region nearest to the Sahara. Nilo-Saharan communities such as the Songhai, Kanuri, and Zarma are found in eastern West Africa.

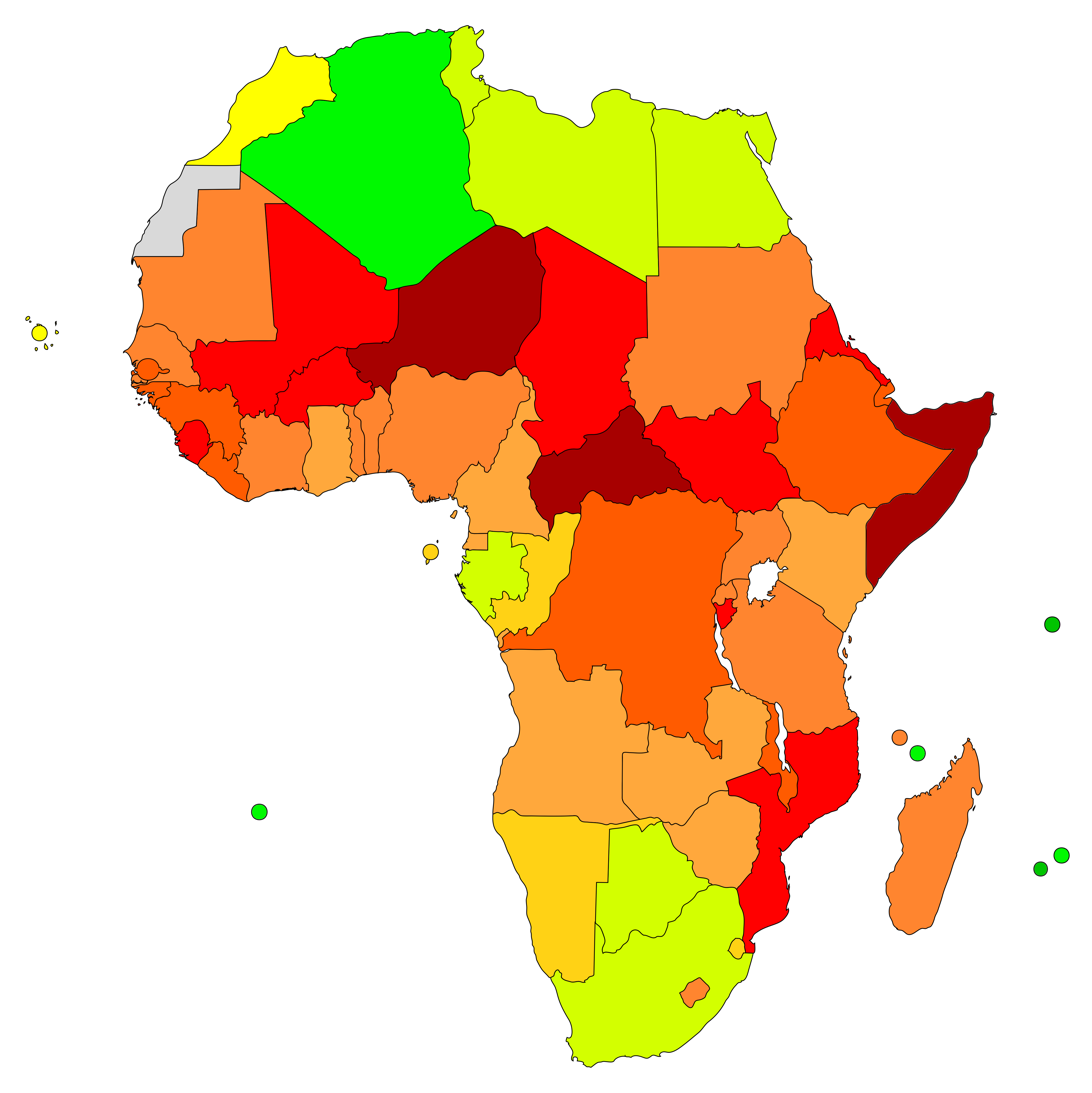
Map of Africa indicating Human Development Index (2018).: 0.800–0.849 0.750–0.799 0.700–0.749 0.650–0.699 0.600–0.649 0.550–0.599 / 0.500–0.549 0.450–0.499 0.400–0.449 ≤ 0.399 No data

The peoples of North Africa consist of three main indigenous groups: Berbers in the northwest, Egyptians in the northeast, and Nilo-Saharan-speaking peoples in the east. The Arabs who arrived in the 7th century introduced the Arabic language and Islam to North Africa. The Semitic Phoenicians (who founded Carthage) and Hyksos, the Indo-Iranian Alans, the Indo-European Greeks, Romans, and Vandals settled in North Africa as well. Significant Berber communities remain within Morocco and Algeria in the 21st century, while Berber speakers are also present in some regions of Tunisia and Libya. The Berber-speaking Tuareg and other often nomadic peoples are the principal inhabitants of the Saharan interior of North Africa. In Mauritania, there is a small, nearly extinct Berber community in the north and Niger–Congo-speaking peoples in the south, though in both regions Arabic and Arab culture predominate. In Sudan, although Arabic and Arab culture predominate, it is mostly inhabited by groups that originally spoke Nilo-Saharan, such as the Nubians, Fur, Masalit and Zaghawa, who, over the centuries, have variously intermixed with migrants from the Arabian Peninsula. Small communities of Afroasiatic-speaking Beja nomads are found in Egypt and Sudan.

In the Horn of Africa, some Ethiopian and Eritrean groups (like the Amhara and Tigrayans, collectively known as Habesha) speak languages from the Semitic branch of the Afroasiatic language family, while the Oromo and Somali speak languages from the Cushitic branch of Afroasiatic.

Prior to the decolonisation movements of the post-World War II era, Europeans were represented in every part of Africa. Decolonisation during the 1960s and 1970s often resulted in the mass emigration of white settlers—especially from Algeria and Morocco (1.6 million pieds-noirs in North Africa), Kenya, Congo, Rhodesia, Mozambique and Angola. Between 1975 and 1977, over a million colonials returned to Portugal alone. Nevertheless, white Africans remain an important minority in many African states, particularly Zimbabwe, Namibia, Réunion, and South Africa. The country with the largest white African population is South Africa. Dutch and British diasporas represent the largest communities of European ancestry on the continent.

European colonisation brought sizable groups of Asians, particularly South Asians, to British colonies. Large Indian communities are found in South Africa, and smaller ones are present in Kenya, Tanzania, and some other southern and southeast African countries. The large Indian community in Uganda was expelled by Idi Amin in 1972, though many have since returned. The islands in the Indian Ocean are populated primarily by people of Asian origin, often mixed with Africans and Europeans. The Malagasy peoples of Madagascar are Austronesian peoples, but those along the coast are generally mixed with Bantu, Arab, Indian and European origins. Malay and Indian ancestries are components in Cape Coloureds (people with origins in two or more races and continents). During the 20th century, small but economically important communities of Lebanese have developed in West and East Africa.

=== Alternative estimates of African population, 1–2018 AD (in thousands) ===
Source: Maddison and others (University of Groningen)

Year	1	1000	1500	1600	1700	1820	1870	1913	1950	1973	1998	2018	2100 (projected)
Africa	16 500	33 000	46 000	55 000	61 000	74 208	90 466	124 697	228 342	387 645	759 954	1 321 000	3 924 421
World	230 820	268 273	437 818	555 828	603 410	1 041 092	1 270 014	1 791 020	2 524 531	3 913 482	5 907 680	7 500 000	10 349 323

=== Shares of Africa and world population, 1–2020 AD (% of world total) ===
Source: Maddison and others (University of Groningen)

Year	1	1000	1500	1600	1700	1820	1870	1913	1950	1973	1998	2020	2100 (projected)
Africa	7.1	12.3	10.5	9.9	10.1	7.1	7.1	7.0	9.0	9.9	12.9	18.2	39.4

=== Genetic history ===
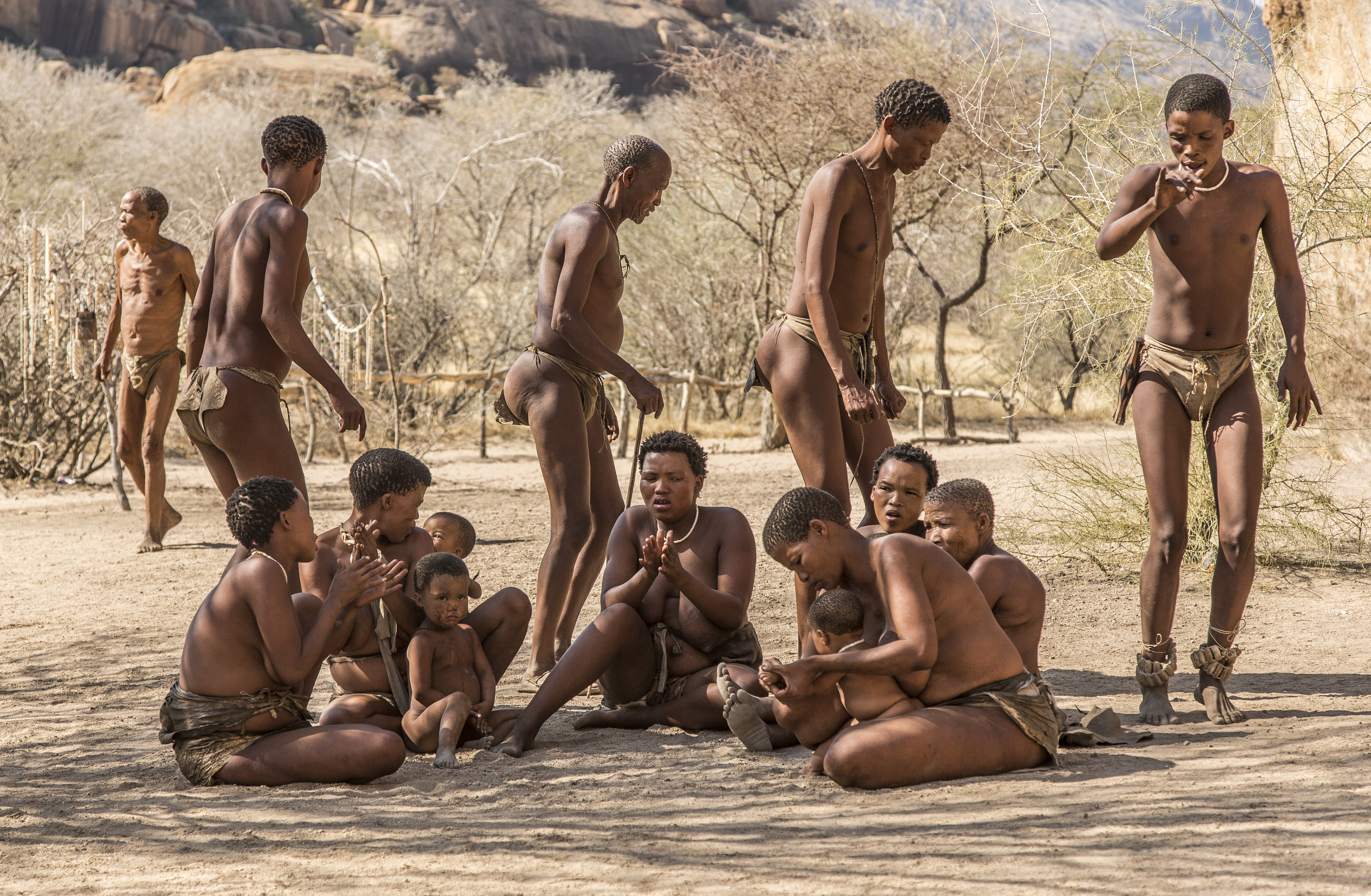
San people lived in southern Africa before the Bantu expansion

Africa has the greatest human genetic diversity of any continent. Ancient DNA and genomic studies reveal deep population structure, with substantial differentiation among ancestral populations in southern, eastern, central, western, and northern Africa, alongside repeated migration and admixture. Some genetic models also infer admixture with deeply divergent, now-extinct "ghost" populations of archaic humans in Africa, whose fossil or genomic identity remains unknown. Later demographic expansions, including the spread of Bantu-speaking populations, substantially reshaped this genetic landscape. Ancient genomes also show distinct demographic histories in North Africa, including long-term regional continuity and later gene flow from Eurasia and elsewhere in Africa.

The Sahara served as a trans-regional passageway and place of dwelling for people in Africa during various humid phases and periods throughout the history of Africa. Early Holocene genetic evidence indicates contacts between populations of the Lake Chad Basin and North Africa. The mitochondrial DNA haplogroup L3e5, which probably originated in the Lake Chad Basin around 10,000 years ago, occurs both there and in parts of North Africa, suggesting gene flow across the Sahara during a period of increased humidity.

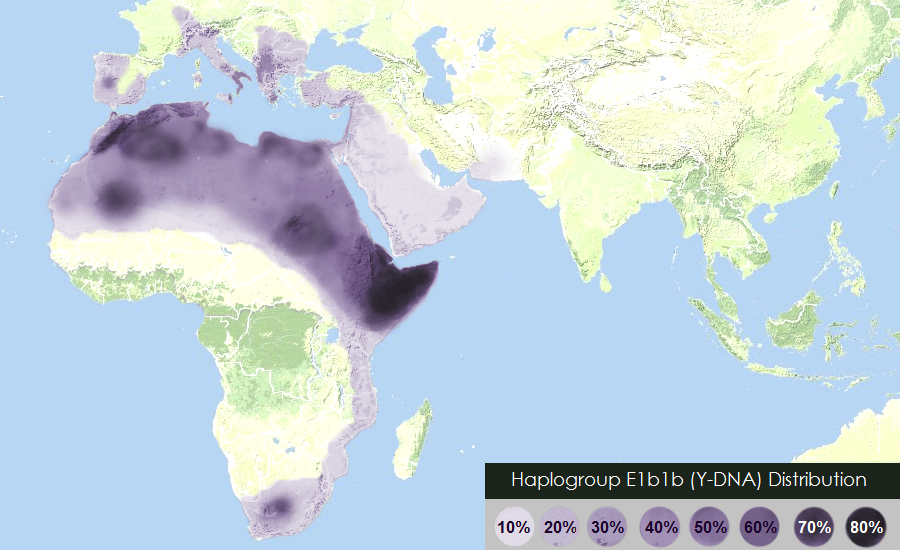
E1b1b is a major Y-chromosomal haplogroup in North and East Africa. Some phylogeographic studies place the origin of major E1b1b lineages in eastern Africa.

Ancient DNA provides evidence for substantial genetic continuity in North Africa alongside contacts with populations from Western Asia. A whole genome from an individual buried at Nuwayrat in Middle Egypt around 2855–2570 BCE was modelled as predominantly deriving from North African Neolithic ancestry, with about 20% of his ancestry related to populations of the eastern Fertile Crescent, including Mesopotamia. Later ancient Egyptians also show increased ancestry related to the Levant, while present-day Egyptians have additional ancestry from sub-Saharan Africa and other regions. Ancient genomes from the Green Sahara likewise indicate the existence of a deeply divergent North African lineage, closely related to ancestry found in 15,000-year-old Taforalt foragers in Morocco.

According to a recent study, the Arab migrations to the Maghreb were mainly a demographic process that heavily implied gene flow and remodelled the genetic structure of the Maghreb region in North Africa, rather than a mere cultural replacement as claimed by older studies. Another study found that the majority of J-M267 (Eu10) chromosomes in the Maghreb are due to the recent gene flow caused by the Arab migrations to the Maghreb in the first millennium CE, as both southern Qahtanite and northern Adnanite Arabs added to the heterogeneous Maghrebi ethnic melting pot. The Eu10 chromosome pool in the Maghreb is derived not only from early Neolithic dispersions from Western Asia but, to a much greater extent, from recent expansions of Arab tribes from the Arabian Peninsula. While acknowledging the genetic impact of Arabisation of Northwest Africa during the Islamic period, other authors have suggested that earlier migration processes – such as the arrival of Neolithic Revolution-era famers from Western Asia and Southern Europe – together with Bronze Age and Iron Age input from Mesopotamia and the Levant were ultimately more genetically impactful.

David Schoenbrun, Christopher Ehret, Steven A. Brandt and Shomarka Keita (2025) have highlighted the problematic categorisation of genetic haplogroups characterised as 'African' and 'Eurasian' in North African genome studies. In reference to the van de Loosdrecht et al. 2018 study on the epipalaeolithic Taforalt remains from Morocco, which identified the EM35 (primarily EM78) common in north-eastern Africa but characterised the mtDNA (female lineage haplogroups) of U6 and M1 as 'Eurasian', the authors questioned the classification of these maternal haplogroups despite their localised and long-established presence in ancient African populations. In their view, identifying a range of African populations may remain an issue "since the idea of 'African' still gets stereotyped or restricted. (Accepting the southwestern Asian/Levantine geographical continuity with Africa eliminates a conceptual barrier related to racio-typological thinking permitting an Africasian construct analogous to Eurasian.)".

=== Religion ===
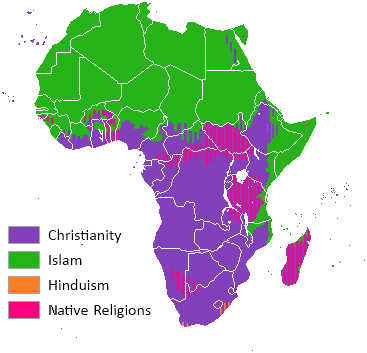
A map showing religious distribution in Africa

While Africans profess a wide variety of religious beliefs, the majority of the people respect African religions or parts of them. However, in formal surveys or censuses, most people will identify with major religions that came from outside the continent, mainly through colonisation. There are several reasons for this, the main one being the colonial idea that African religious beliefs and practices are not good enough. Religious beliefs and statistics on religious affiliation are difficult to come by since they are often a sensitive topic for governments with mixed religious populations. According to the World Book Encyclopedia, Islam and Christianity are the two largest religions. Islam is most prevalent in and is the state religion of many North African countries, such as Algeria, where 99% of the population practices Islam. The majority of people in Southern, Southeast, and Central Africa, as well as in a sizable portion of the Horn of Africa and West Africa, identify as Christians. Coptic Christians constitute a sizable minority in Egypt, and the Ethiopian Orthodox Church is the largest church in Ethiopia, with 36 million and 51 million adherents. According to Encyclopædia Britannica, 45% of the population are Christians, 40% are Muslims, and 10% follow traditional religions. A small number of Africans are Hindu, Buddhist, Confucianist, Baháʼí, or Jewish. There is a minority of irreligious people.

=== Languages ===
A simplistic view of language families spoken in Africa

By most estimates, well over a thousand languages (UNESCO has estimated around two thousand) are spoken in Africa. Most are of African origin, though some are of European or Asian origin. Africa is the most multilingual continent in the world, and it is not rare for individuals to fluently speak multiple African languages as well as one or more European languages. There are four major groups indigenous to Africa:

- The Afroasiatic languages are a language family of about 240 languages and 285 million people widespread throughout the Horn of Africa, North Africa, the Sahel, and Southwest Asia.
- The Nilo-Saharan languages consist of a group of several possibly related families, spoken by 30 million people across 100 languages. Nilo-Saharan languages are spoken by ethnic groups in Chad, Ethiopia, Kenya, Nigeria, Sudan, South Sudan, Uganda, and northern Tanzania.
- The Niger-Congo language family covers much of sub-Saharan Africa. In terms of number of languages, it is the largest language family in Africa and perhaps one of the largest in the world.
- The Khoisan languages form a group of three unrelated families and two isolates and number about fifty in total. They are mainly spoken in Southern Africa by approximately 400,000 people. Many of the Khoisan languages are endangered. The Khoi and San peoples are considered the original inhabitants of this part of Africa.

Following the end of colonialism, nearly all countries adopted official languages that originated outside the continent, although several countries also granted legal recognition to indigenous languages (such as Swahili, Yoruba, Igbo and Hausa). In numerous countries, English and French (see African French) are used for communication in the public sphere such as government, commerce, education and the media. Arabic, Portuguese, Afrikaans and Spanish are examples of languages that trace their origin to outside of Africa, and that are used by millions of Africans today, both in the public and private spheres. Italian is spoken by some in former Italian colonies. German is spoken in Namibia, as it was a former German protectorate. At least one-fifth of Africans speak the former colonial languages. (Note: The previous three references show that there are a total of 130 million English speakers, 120 million French speakers, and over 30 million Portuguese speakers in Africa, making them about 20% of Africa's 2022 population of 1.4 billion people.) Moreover, in recent years some countries have been considering removing their official former colonial languages; examples include Mali, Burkina Faso and Niger, which removed French as an official language in the 2020s in favour of native languages, while also renaming colonial street names.

=== Health ===
Prevalence of HIV/AIDS in Africa, total (% of population ages 15–49), in 2011 (World Bank) over 15% 5–15% 2–5% 1–2% 0.5–1% 0.1–0.5% not available

More than 85% of individuals use traditional medicine as an alternative to often expensive allopathic medical health care and costly pharmaceutical products. The OAU declared the 2000s as the African Decade on African traditional medicine in an effort to promote the WHO African Region's adopted resolution for institutionalising traditional medicine in health care systems. Public policymakers in the region are challenged with considering the importance of traditional/indigenous health systems and whether their coexistence with the modern medical and health sub-sector would improve the equity and accessibility of health care distribution, the health status of populations, and the socio-economic development of nations within sub-Saharan Africa.

AIDS in post-colonial Africa is a prevalent issue. Although the continent is home to about 15.2 percent of the world's population, more than two-thirds of the total infected worldwide—some 35 million people—were Africans, of whom 15 million have died. Sub-Saharan Africa alone accounted for an estimated 69 percent of all people living with HIV and 70 percent of all AIDS deaths in 2011. In sub-Saharan Africa, AIDS has raised death rates and lowered life expectancy among adults between ages 20 and 49 by about 20 years. Life expectancy has declined largely as a result of the HIV/AIDS epidemic, with life expectancy in some countries falling as low as 34 years.

== Culture ==
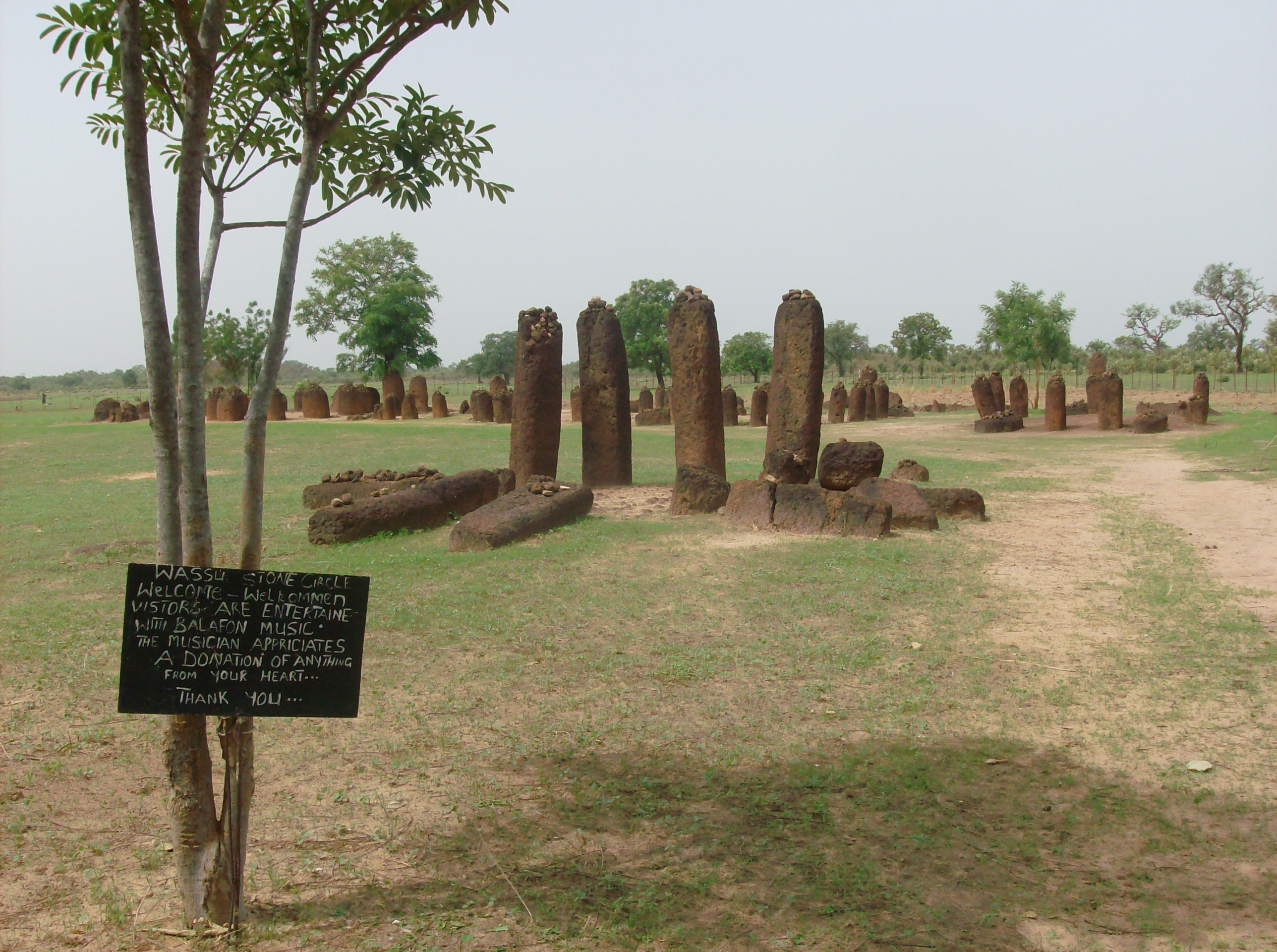
The Senegambian stone circles, lying in The Gambia and Senegal, are a UNESCO World Heritage Site.

Africa is divided into a great number of ethnic cultures. Cultural regeneration has been an integral aspect of post-independence nation-building, with a recognition of the need to harness the cultural resources to enrich the process of education, requiring the creation of an enabling environment in several ways. In recent times, the call for a much greater emphasis on the cultural dimension in all aspects of development has become increasingly vocal. Some aspects of traditional cultures have become less practised in recent years as a result of neglect and suppression by colonial and post-colonial regimes. For example, African customs were discouraged, and African languages were prohibited in mission schools, while colonialists such as Leopold II of Belgium attempted to "civilize" Africans by discouraging polygamy and witchcraft.

Editors F. Abiola Irele and Simon Gikandi comment that the current identity of African literature had its genesis in the "traumatic encounter between Africa and Europe". On the other hand, Mhoze Chikowero believes that Africans deployed music, dance, spirituality, and other performative cultures to (re)assert themselves as active agents and indigenous intellectuals, to unmake their colonial marginalisation and reshape their own destinies.

As of March 2023, 98 African properties are listed by UNESCO as World Heritage Sites, with 54 cultural sites, 39 natural sites, and 5 mixed sites. The List of World Heritage in Danger includes 15 African sites.

=== Visual art ===
African art refers to works of visual art, including works of sculpture, painting, metalwork, and pottery, originating from the various peoples of the African continent and influenced by distinct, indigenous traditions of aesthetic expression.

While the various artistic traditions of such a large and diverse continent display considerable regional and cultural variety, there are consistent artistic themes, recurring motifs, and unifying elements across the broad spectrum of African visual expression. As is the case for every artistic tradition in human history, African art was created within specific social, political, and religious contexts. Likewise, African art was often created not purely for art's sake, but rather with some practical, spiritual, and/or didactic purpose in mind. In general, African art prioritizes conceptual and symbolic representation over realism, aiming to visualize the subject's spiritual essence.

Ethiopian art, heavily influenced by Ethiopia's long-standing Christian tradition, is also different from most African art, where Traditional African religion (with Islam prevalent in the northeast and northwest presently) was dominant until the 20th century. African art includes prehistoric and ancient art, the Islamic art of West Africa, the Christian art of East Africa, and the traditional artifacts of these and other regions. Many African sculptures were historically made of wood and other natural materials that have not survived from earlier than a few centuries ago, although rare older pottery and metal figures can be found in some areas. Some of the earliest decorative objects, such as shell beads and evidence of paint, have been discovered in Africa, dating to the Middle Stone Age.

Masks are important elements in the art of many people, along with human figures, and are often highly stylized. There exist diverse styles, which can often be observed within a single context of origin and may be influenced by the intended use of the object. Nevertheless, broad regional trends are discernible. Sculpture is most common among "groups of settled cultivators in the areas drained by the Niger and Congo rivers" in West Africa. Direct images of deities are relatively infrequent, but masks in particular are or were often made for ritual ceremonies. Since the late 19th century, there has been an increasing amount of African art in Western collections, the finest pieces of which are displayed as part of the history of colonization.

African art had an important influence on European Modernist art, which was inspired by their interest in abstract depiction. It was this appreciation of African sculpture that has been attributed to the very concept of "African art", as seen by European and American artists and art historians.

Obidoh Freeborn posits that colonialism is one element that has created the character of modern African art. According to authors Douglas Fraser and Herbert M. Cole, "The precipitous alterations in the power structure wrought by colonialism were quickly followed by drastic iconographic changes in the art." Fraser and Cole assert that in Igboland some art objects "lack the vigor and careful craftsmanship of the earlier art objects that served traditional functions". Author Chika Okeke-Agulu states that "the racist infrastructure of British imperial enterprise forced upon the political and cultural guardians of empire a denial and suppression of an emergent sovereign Africa and modernist art".

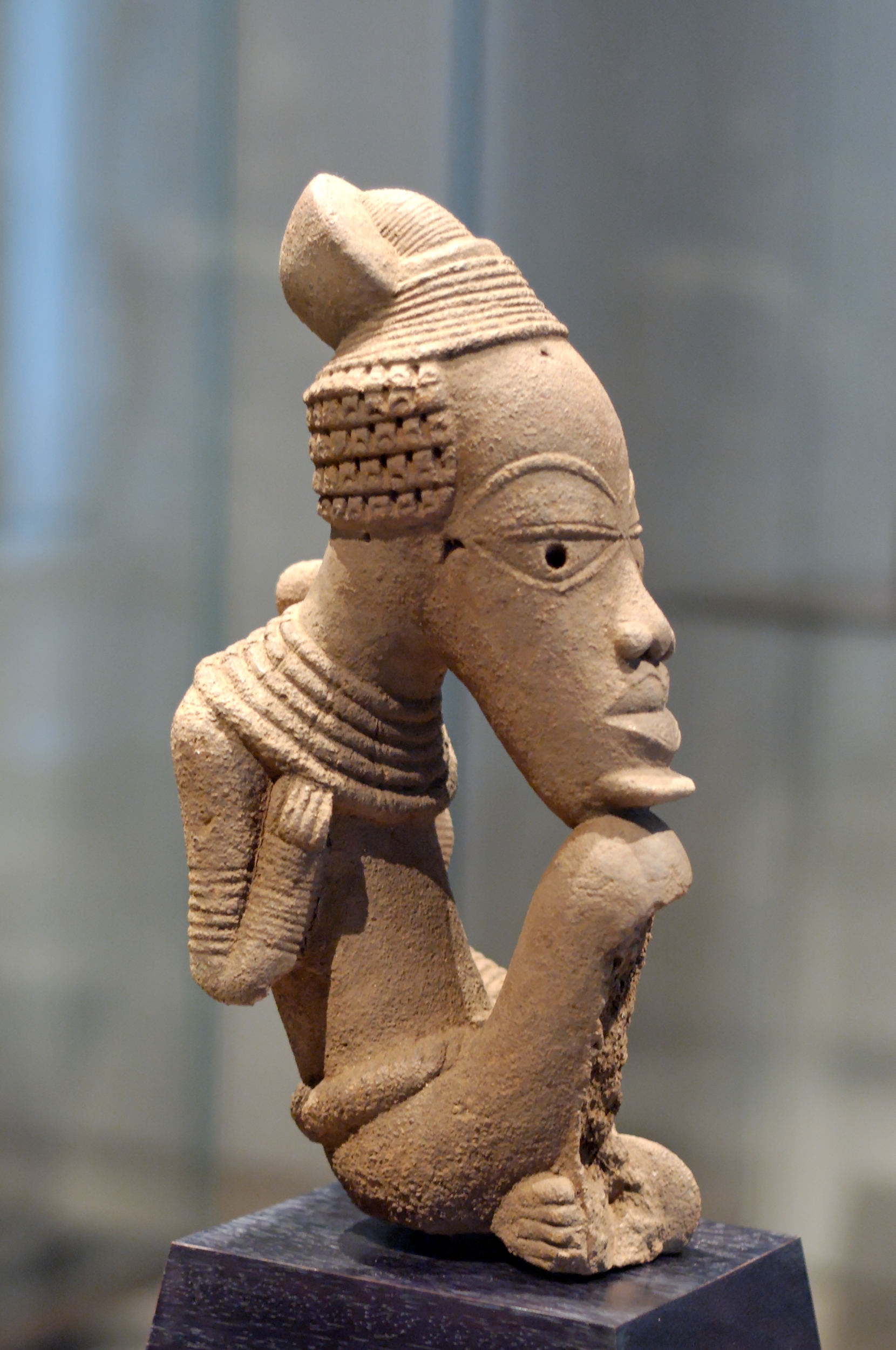
Nok figure, Nigeria (5th century BCE–5th century CE)

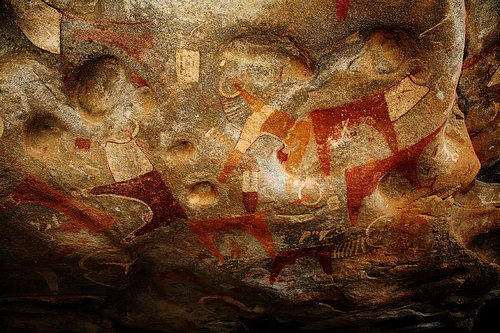
Rock art at the Laas Geel complex in Somalia, 3,500–2,500 BCE

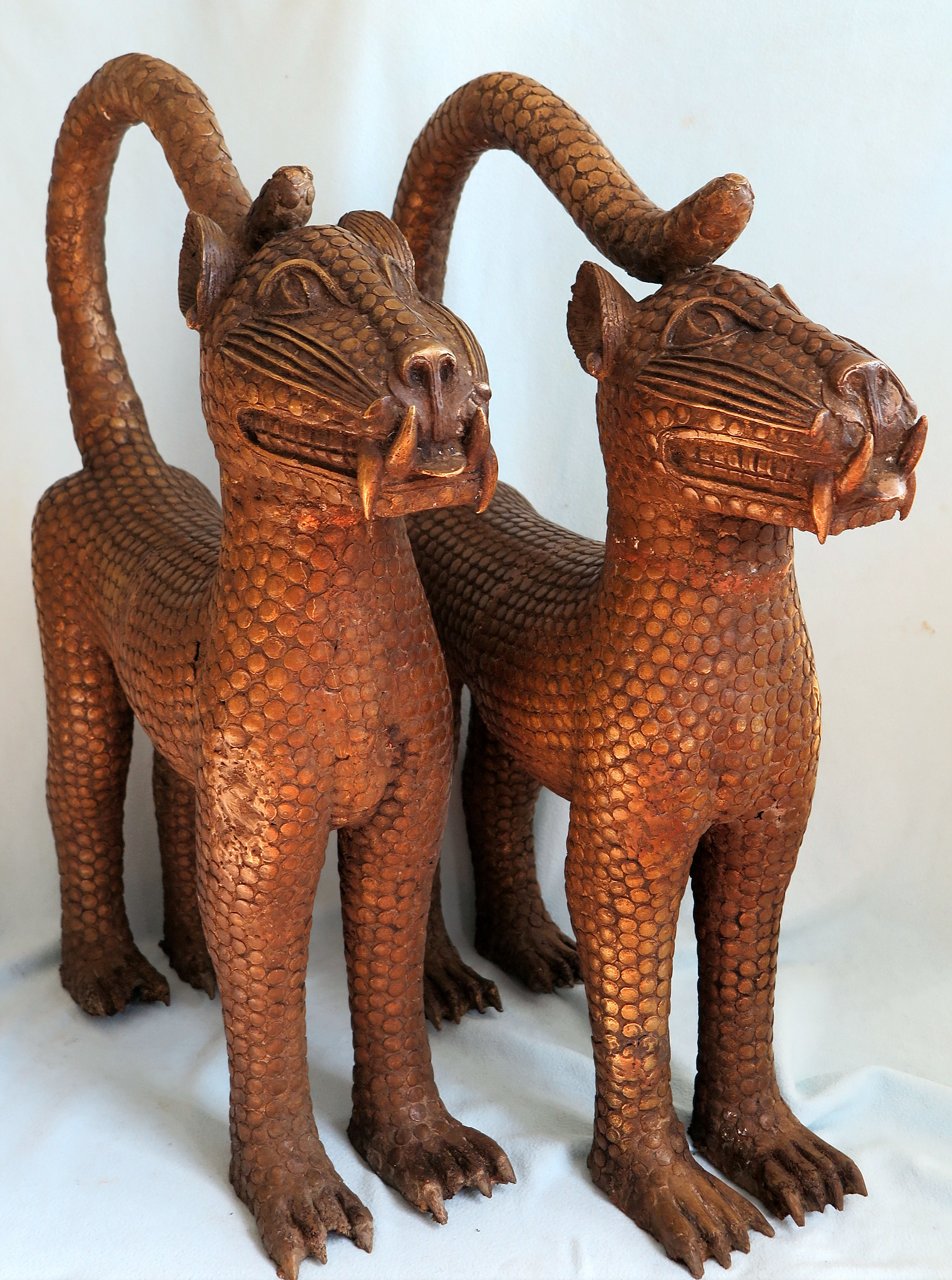
Two Benin Bronzes from the 18th century

=== Architecture ===
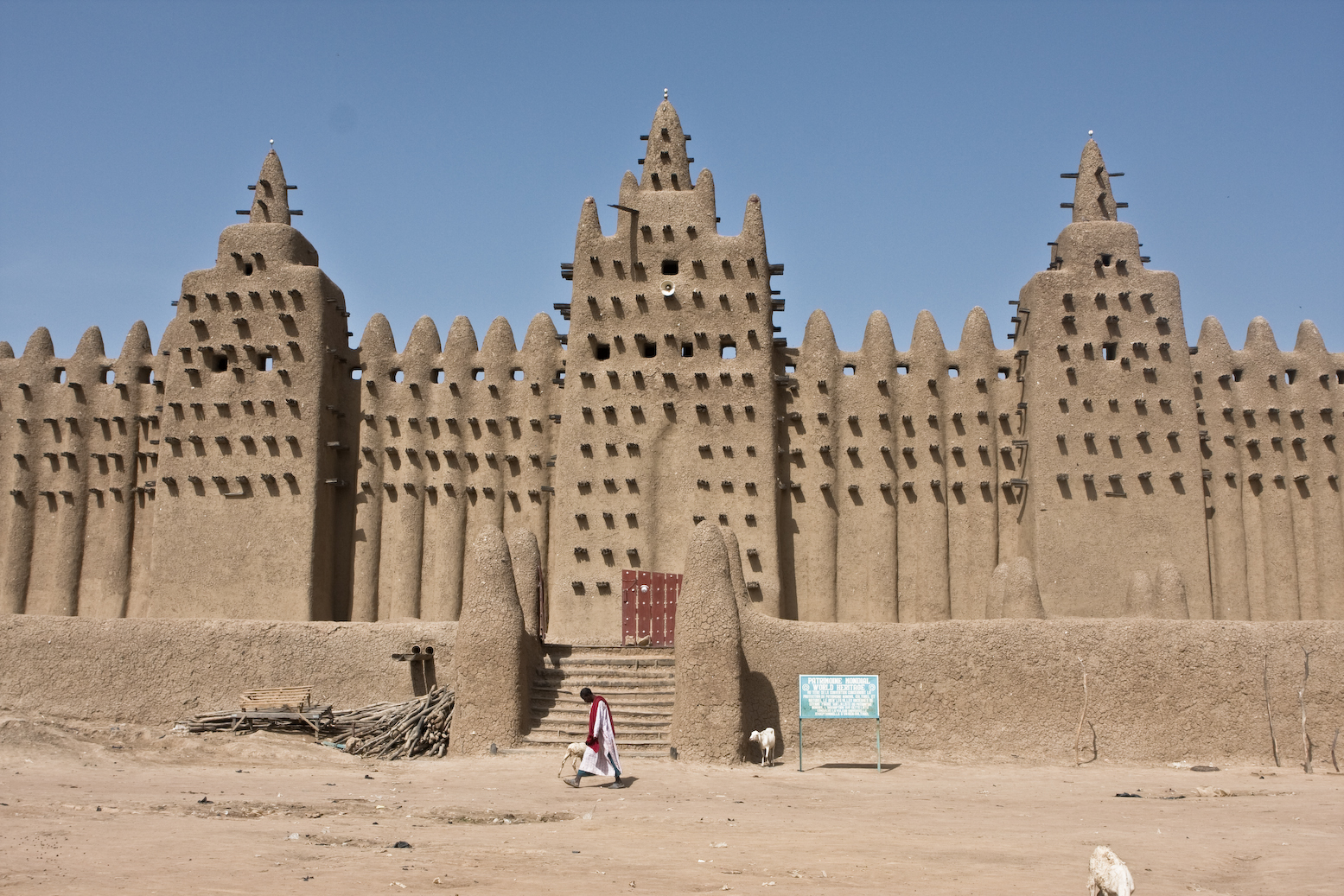
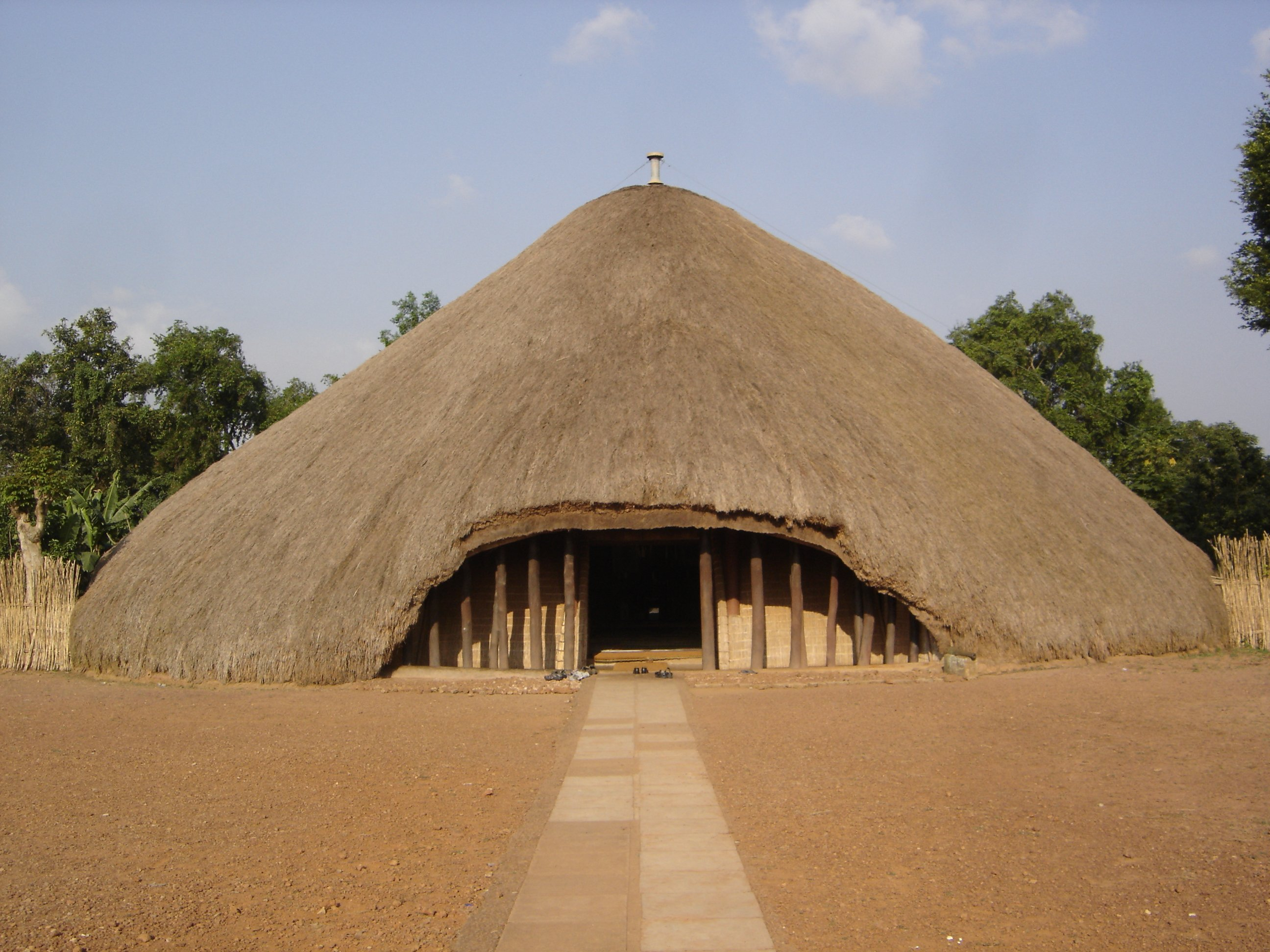
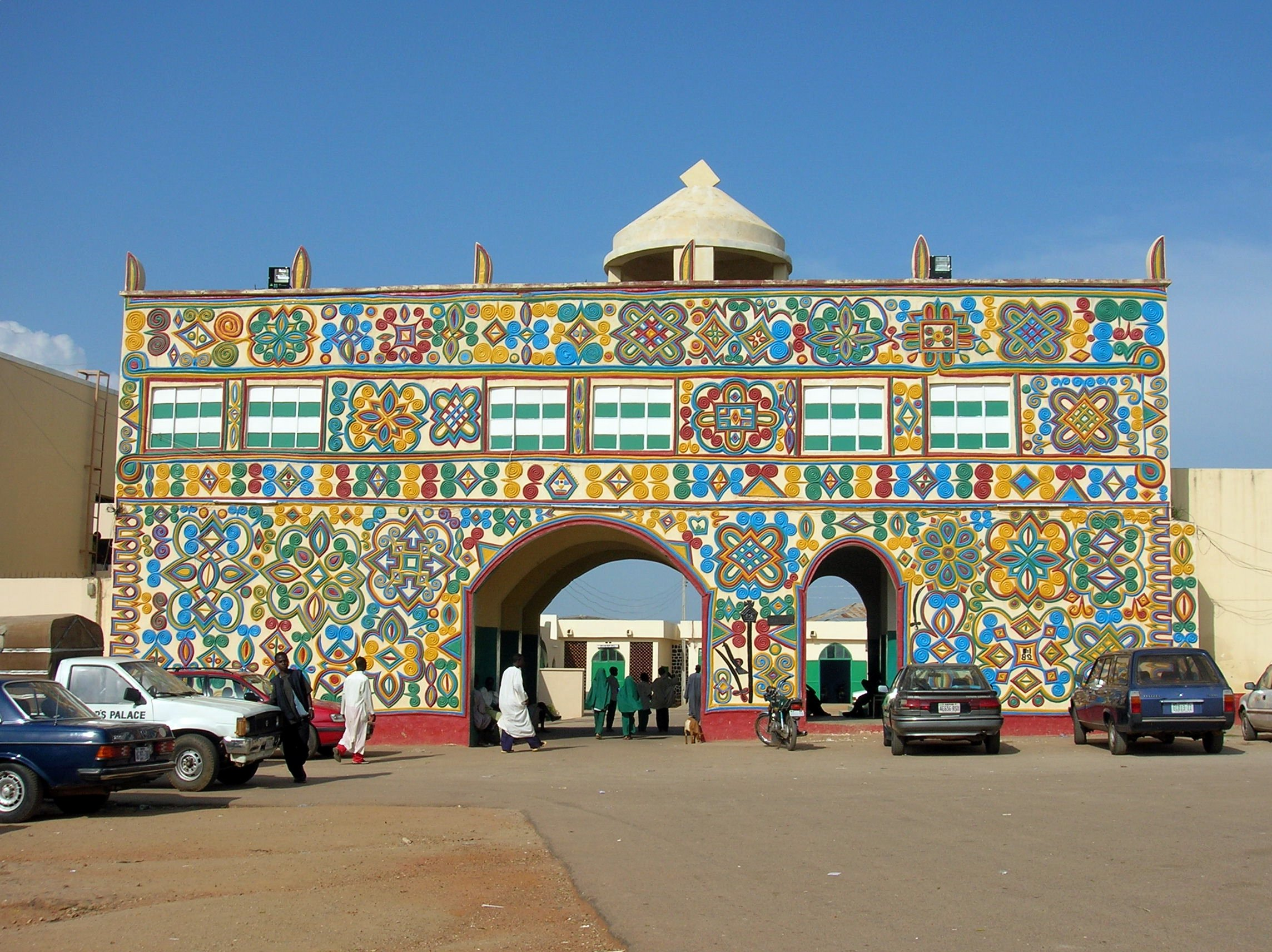
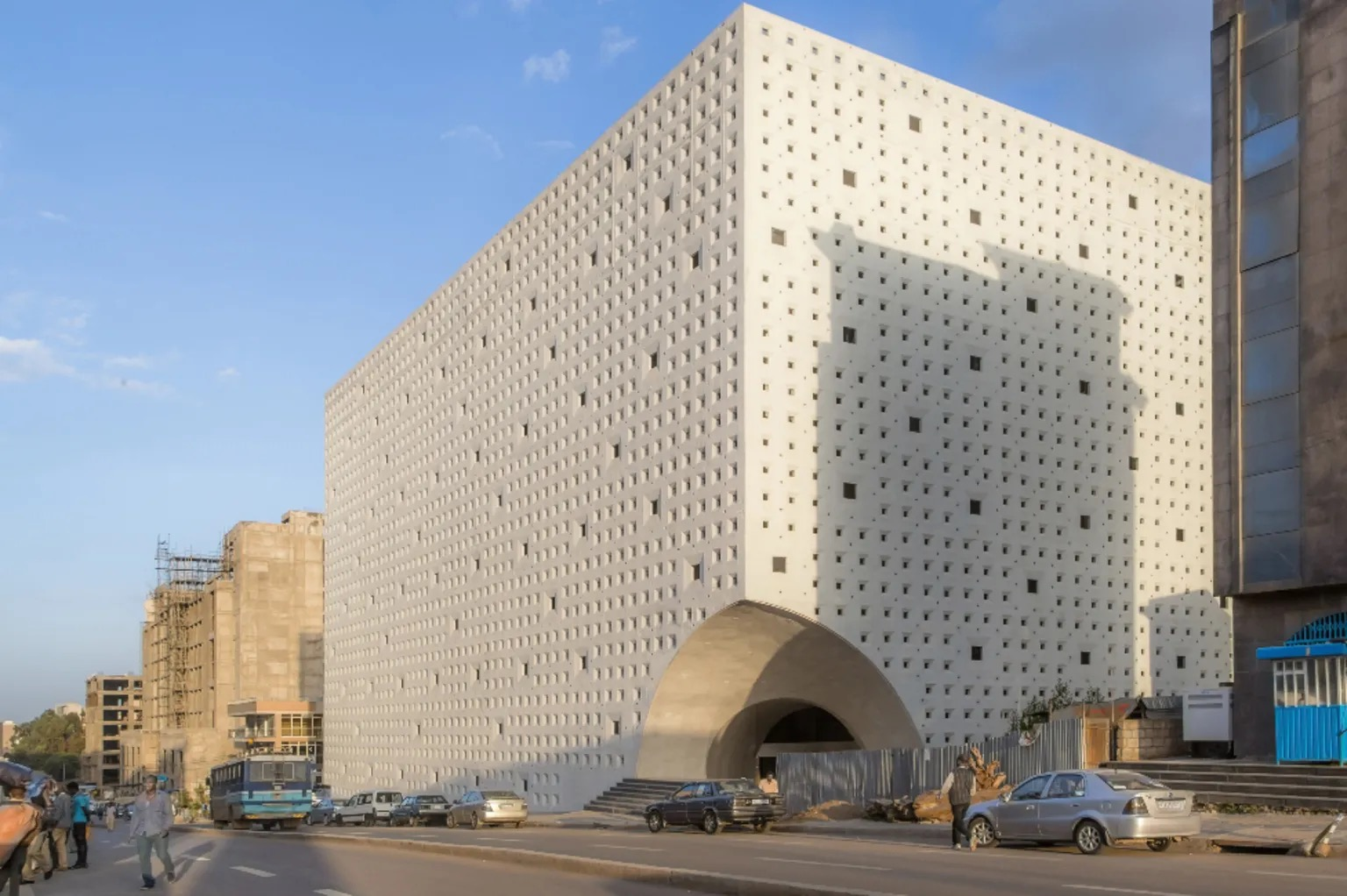
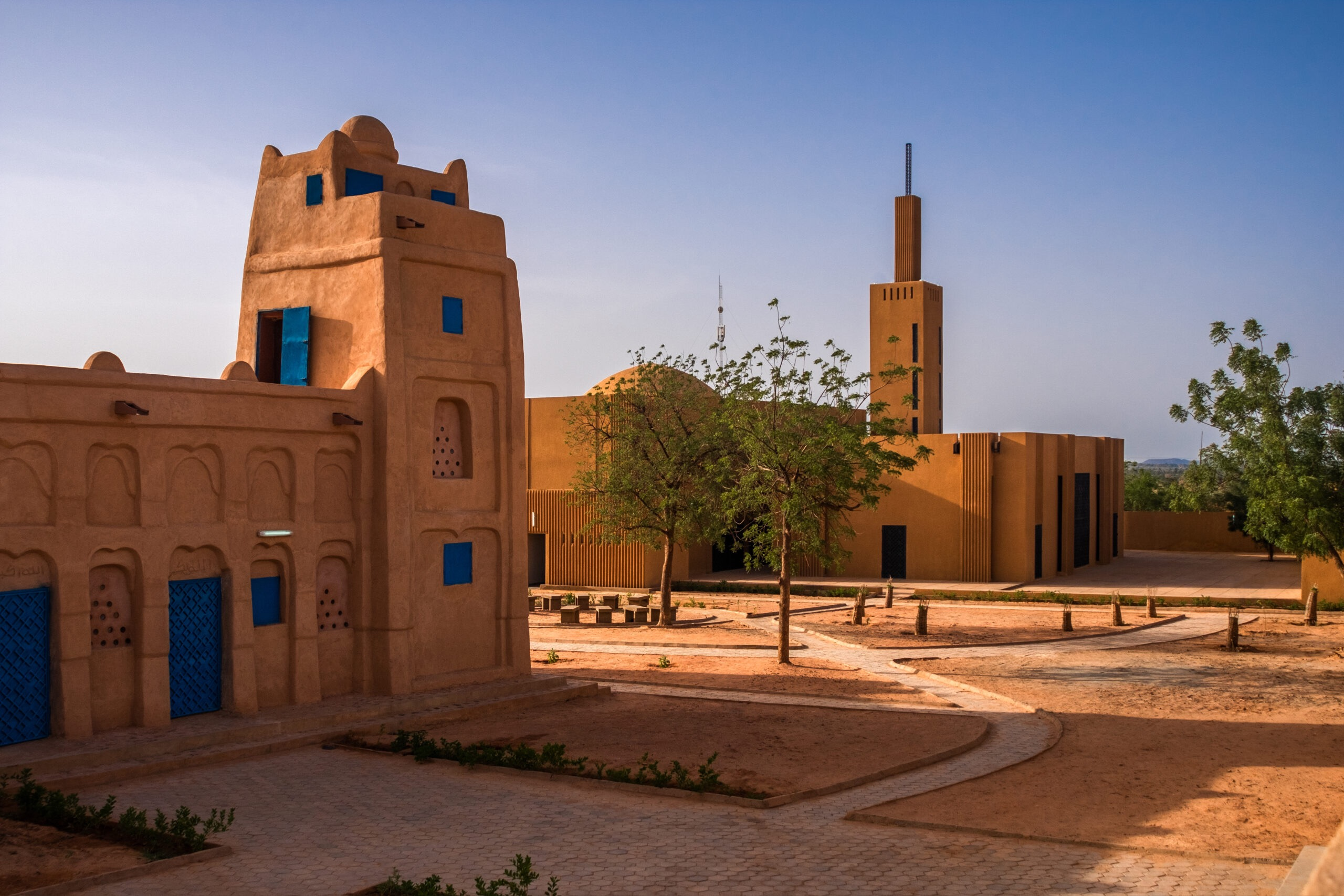
Clockwise from upper left: Great Mosque of Djenne in Mali; Kasubi Tombs in Uganda; Lideta Market in Ethiopia; Hikma Religious and Secular Complex in Niger; Zaria Emir's Palace Gate in Nigeria.
Like other aspects of the culture of Africa, the architecture of Africa is exceptionally diverse. Throughout the history of Africa, Africans have developed their own local architectural traditions. In some cases, broader regional styles can be identified, such as the Sudano-Sahelian architecture of West Africa. A common theme in traditional African architecture is the use of fractal scaling: small parts of the structure tend to look similar to larger parts, such as a circular village made of circular houses.

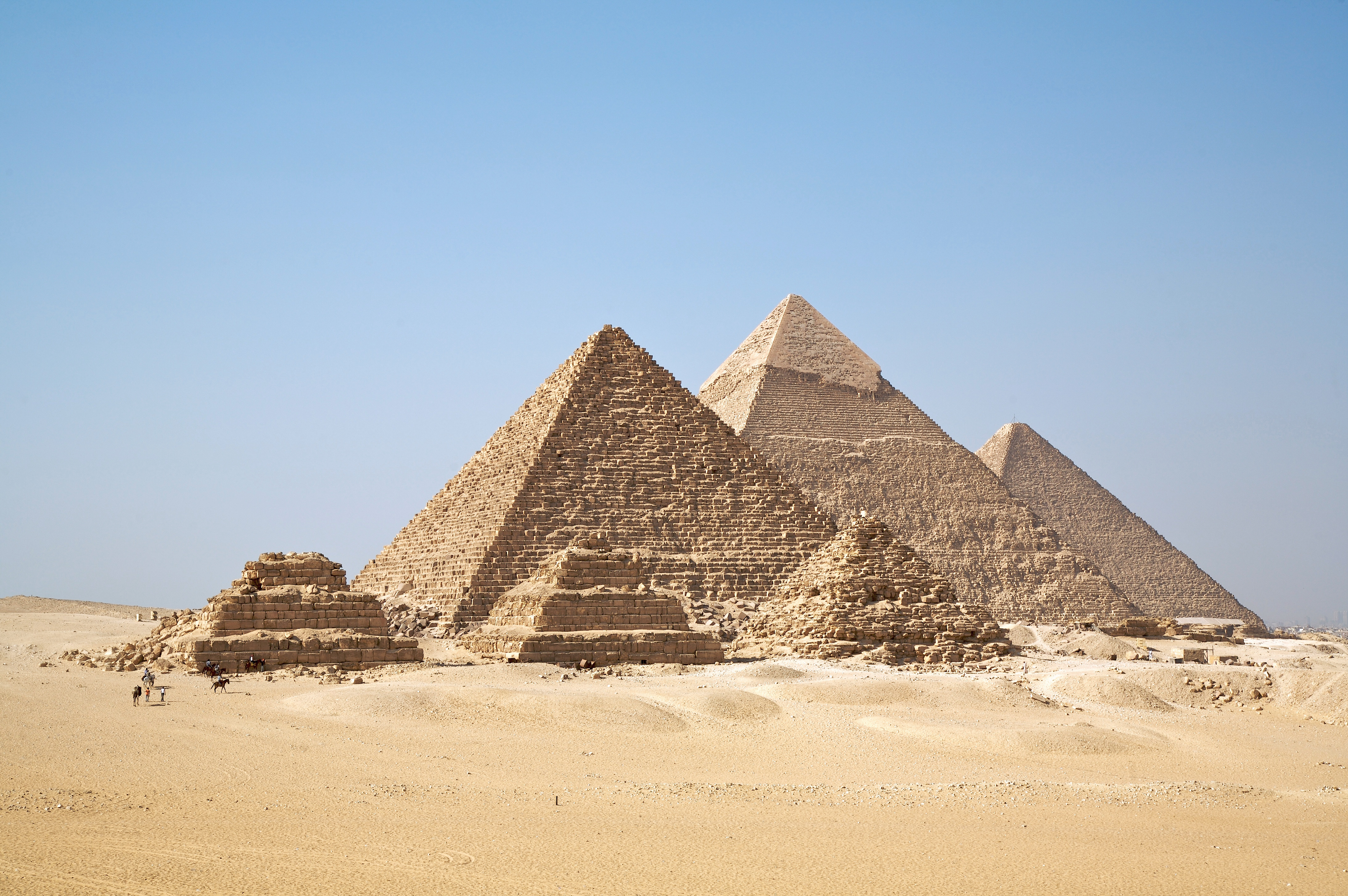
The Great Pyramids of Giza are regarded as one of the greatest architectural feats of all time and are one of the Seven Wonders of the Ancient World.

African architecture in some areas has been influenced by external cultures for centuries, according to available evidence. Western architecture has influenced coastal areas since the late 15th century and is now an important source of inspiration for many larger buildings, particularly in major cities.

African architecture uses a wide range of materials, including thatch, stick/wood, mud, mudbrick, rammed earth, and stone. These material preferences vary by region: North Africa for stone and rammed earth, the Horn of Africa for stone and mortar, West Africa for mud/adobe, Central Africa for thatch/wood and more perishable materials, Southeast and Southern Africa for stone and thatch/wood.

=== Cinema ===
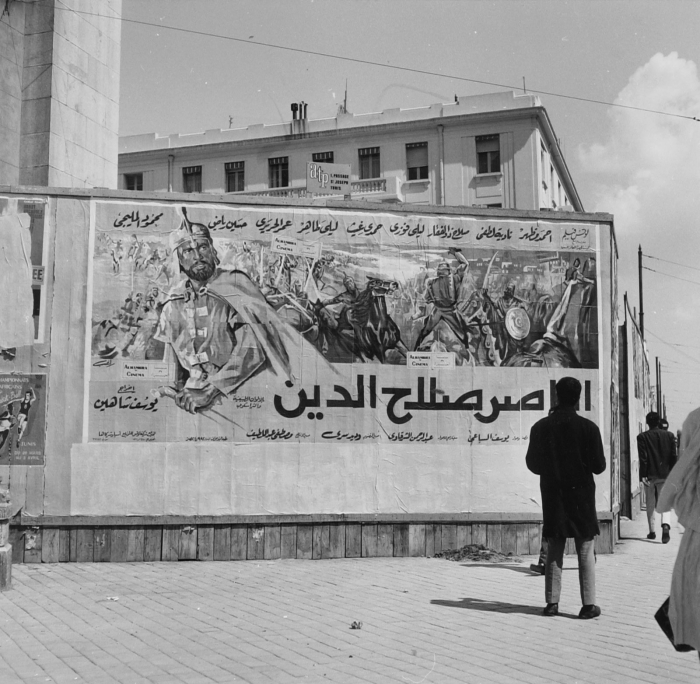
Cinematic street poster in Tunis, Tunisia for the Egyptian film Saladin the Victorious (1963, Arabic: الناصر صلاح الدين, Al Nasser Salah Ad-Din) directed by Youssef Chahine starring Ahmed Mazhar as Saladin, Salah Zulfikar, Nadia Lutfi and others

Cinema of Africa refers to the film industries and films produced in the continent of Africa. It covers both the history and present of the making or screening of films on the African continent, and also refers to the persons involved in this form of audiovisual culture. It dates back to the late 19th century, when film reels were the primary cinematic technology in use. Cairo has been the capital of the film industry in Africa from the early 20th century to the present day.

As there are more than 50 countries with audiovisual traditions, there is no single 'African cinema'. Both historically and culturally, there are major regional differences between North African and sub-Saharan cinemas, and between the cinemas of different countries. The Egyptian and the Tunisian film industries are also among the oldest in the world. The cinema of Egypt in particular is the most established and flourishing industry in Africa. Pioneers Auguste and Louis Lumière screened their films in Alexandria, Cairo, Tunis, Susa, Libya and Hammam-Lif, Tunisia, in 1896. Albert Samama Chikly is often cited as the first producer of indigenous African cinema, screening his own short documentaries in the casino of Tunis as early as December 1905.

=== Music ===
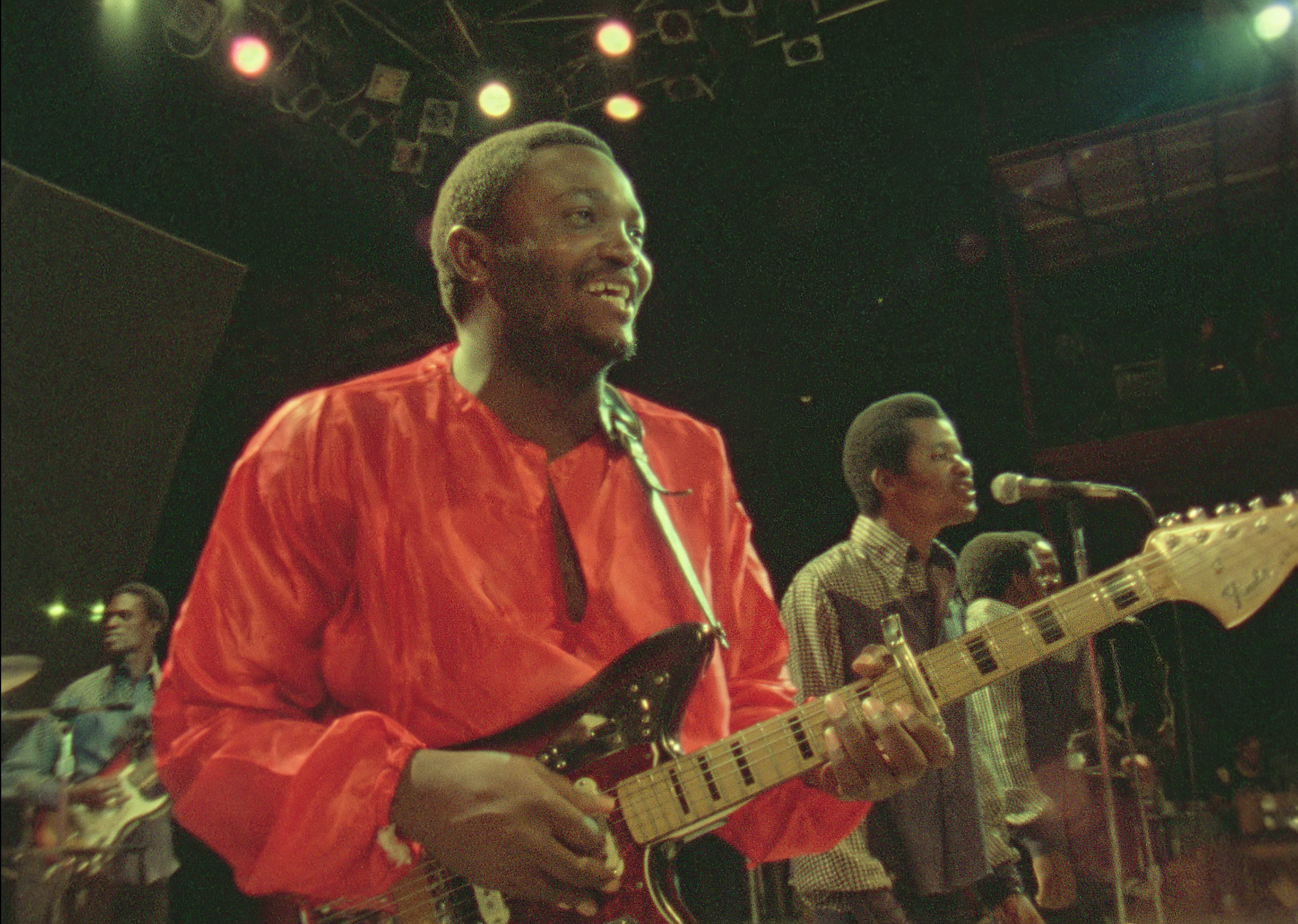
Franco Luambo

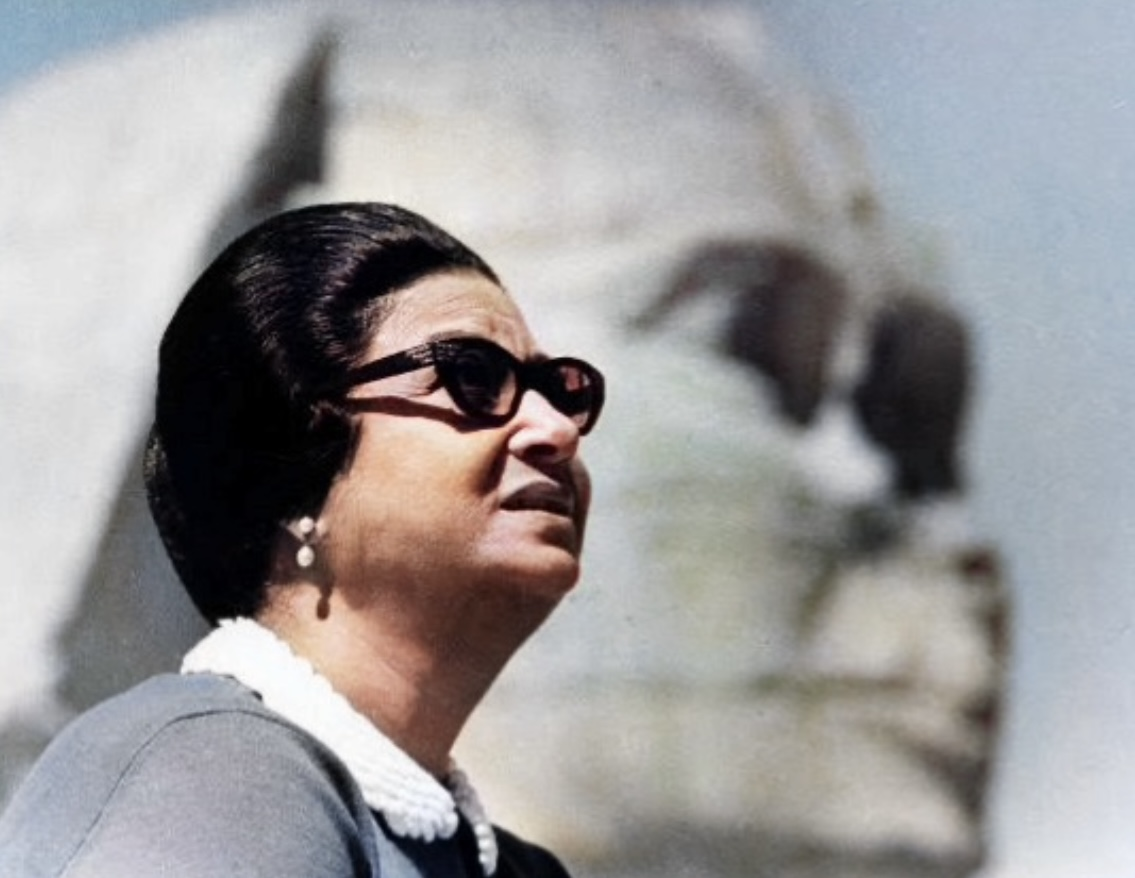
Umm Kulthum

The music of Africa is vast and highly diverse, with different regions and nations maintaining distinct musical traditions. African music includes genres such as makwaya, highlife, mbube, township music, jùjú, fuji, jaiva, afrobeat, afrofusion, mbalax, Congolese rumba, soukous, ndombolo, makossa, kizomba, and taarab, among others. African music also uses a wide variety of instruments from across the continent.

The music and dance traditions of the African diaspora, shaped to varying degrees by African musical traditions, include American genres such as Dixieland jazz, blues, and jazz, as well as Caribbean styles such as calypso (see kaiso) and soca. Latin American music genres including cumbia, salsa, son cubano, rumba, conga, bomba, samba, and zouk developed from the music of enslaved Africans and have, in turn, influenced contemporary African popular music.

=== Dance ===
African dance (also Afro dance, Afrodance and Afro-dance) refers to the various dance styles of sub-Saharan Africa. These dances are closely connected with the traditional rhythms and music traditions of the region. Music and dancing are an integral part of many traditional African societies. Songs and dances facilitate teaching and promoting social values, the celebration of special events and major life milestones, the performance of oral history and other recitations, and spiritual experiences. African dance uses the concepts of polyrhythm and total body articulation. African dances are often a collective activity performed in large groups, with significant interaction between dancers and onlookers.

=== Sports ===
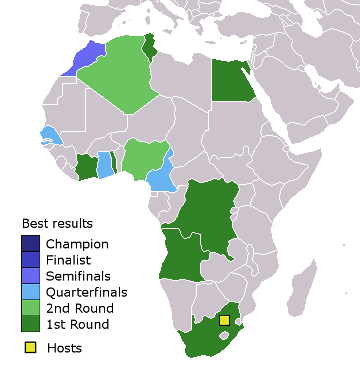
Best results of African men's national football teams at the FIFA World Cup

Fifty-four African countries have football teams in the Confederation of African Football. Egypt has won the African Cup seven times, and a record-making three times in a row. Cameroon, Nigeria, Morocco, Senegal, Ghana, and Algeria have advanced to the knockout stage of recent FIFA World Cups. Morocco at the 2022 World Cup in Qatar was the first African nation to reach the semi-finals of the FIFA Men's World Cup. South Africa hosted the 2010 World Cup tournament, becoming the first African country to do so. The top clubs in each football league play in the CAF Champions League, while lower-ranked clubs compete in the CAF Confederation Cup.

In recent years, the continent has progressed in terms of state-of-the-art basketball facilities, which have been built in cities such as Cairo, Dakar, Johannesburg, Kigali, Luanda, and Rades. The number of African basketball players who were drafted into the U.S. NBA experienced growth in the 2010s.

Cricket is popular in some nations. South Africa and Zimbabwe have Test status, while Kenya is the leading non-Test team and previously had One-Day International cricket status (from 10 October 1997, until 30 January 2014). The three countries jointly hosted the 2003 Cricket World Cup. Namibia has also played in a World Cup. Morocco hosted the 2002 Morocco Cup, but the national team has never qualified for a major tournament.

Rugby is popular in several southern African nations. Namibia and Zimbabwe have appeared on multiple occasions at the Rugby World Cup, while South Africa is the most successful national team at the Rugby World Cup, having won the tournament on four occasions, in 1995, 2007, 2019, and 2023.

Traditional sports were strictly marginalised during the colonial era, and many are dying or have gone extinct under the pressure of modernisation; however, many remain popular despite not having formal governmental recognition or support. Some examples are Senegalese wrestling, Dambe, Nguni stick-fighting, and Savika.

== See also ==
- Index of Africa-related articles
- Outline of Africa
- Cradle of humanity
- Cradle of civilization

== Sources ==
This article incorporates text from a free content work. Licensed under CC BY 4.0 (license statement/permission). Text taken from Global Forest Resources Assessment 2025, Food and Agriculture Organization of the United Nations (FAO).

This article incorporates text from a free content work. Licensed under CC BY 4.0 (license statement/permission). Text taken from World Food and Agriculture – Statistical Yearbook 2025, Food and Agriculture Organization of the United Nations.

This article incorporates text from a free content work. Licensed under CC BY 4.0 (license statement/permission). Text taken from The State of Food Security and Nutrition in the World 2026, Food and Agriculture Organization of the United Nations.
