= List of French possessions and colonies =

From the 16th to the 17th centuries, the First French colonial empire existed mainly in the Americas and Asia. During the 19th and 20th centuries, the second French colonial empire existed mainly in Africa and Asia. France had about 80 colonies throughout its history, the second most colonies in the world behind only the British Empire. Around 40 countries gained independence from France throughout its history, the second most in the world behind only the British Empire. Over 50% of the world’s borders today were drawn as a result of British and French imperialism.

France began to establish colonies in North America, the Caribbean and India, following Spanish and Portuguese successes during the Age of Discovery, in rivalry with Britain. A series of wars with Britain during the 18th century and early 19th century, which France finally lost, almost ended its colonial ambitions in these regions, and without it what some historians term the "first" French colonial empire. In the 19th century, starting with the Occupation of Algeria in 1830, France began to establish a new empire in Africa and Southeast Asia. The following is a list of all countries that were part of the French colonial empires from 1534; 492 years ago to the present, either entirely or in part, either under French sovereignty or as mandate.

== In the Americas ==
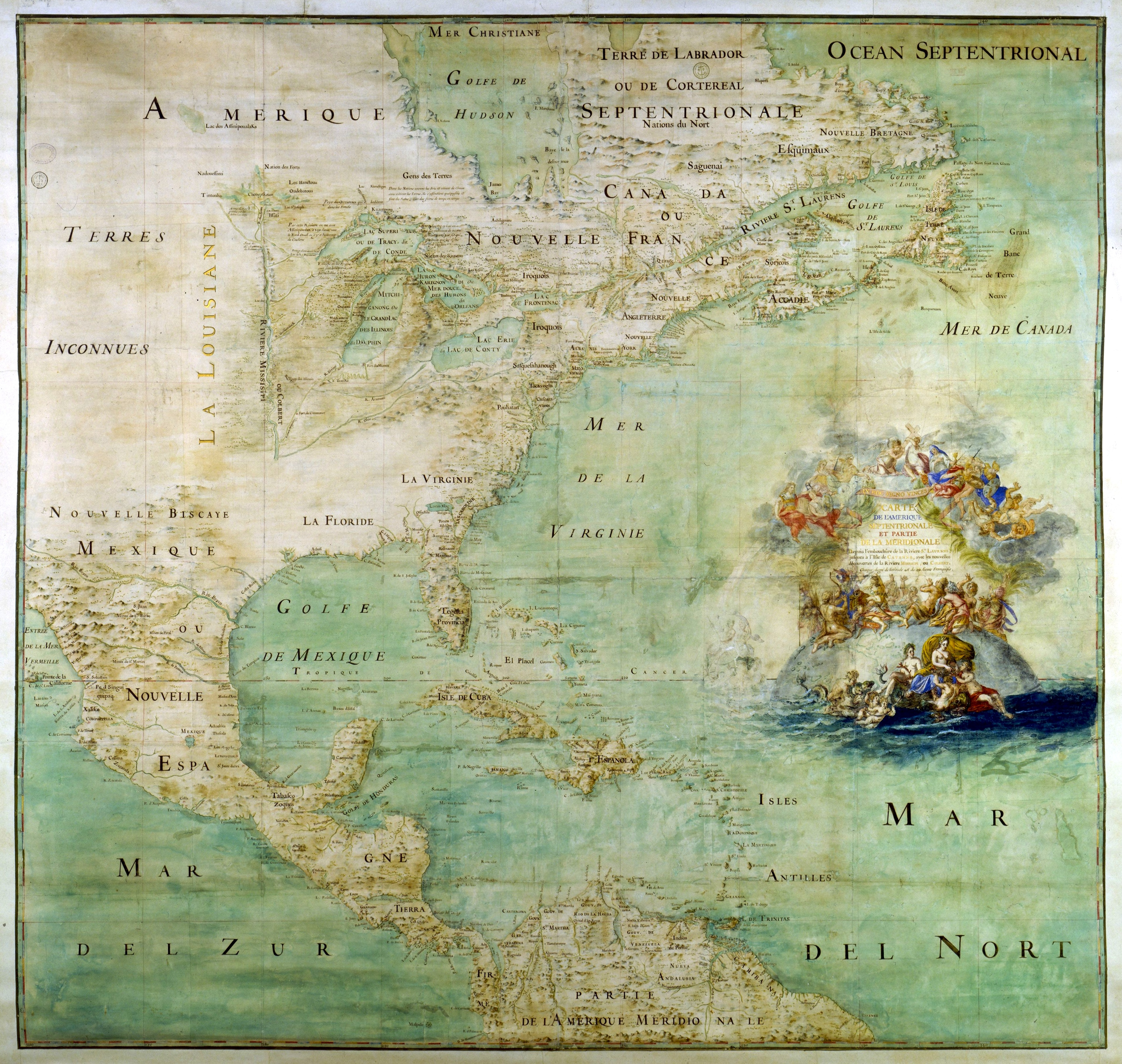
Map of the northern part and upper southern parts of the Americas, showing the results of the expeditions of Father Marquette and Louis Jolliet (1673) and of Cavelier de la Salle in the Mississippi valley (1681).

Map of the territories having been claimed by France in North America.

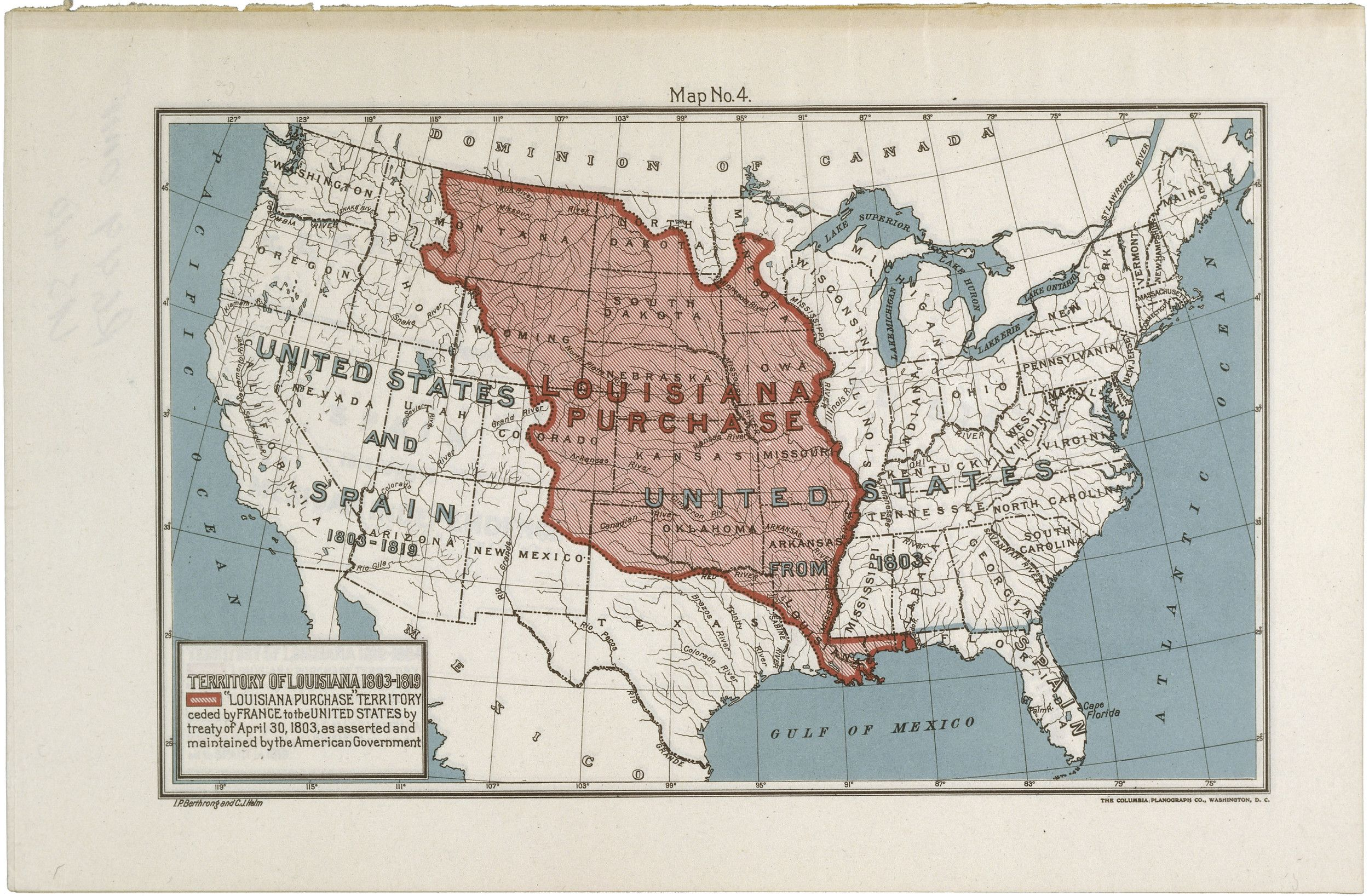
This map shows the Louisiana Purchase area, which corresponds approximately with the western half of colonial French Louisiana, the part not ceded to English-speaking peoples in 1763.

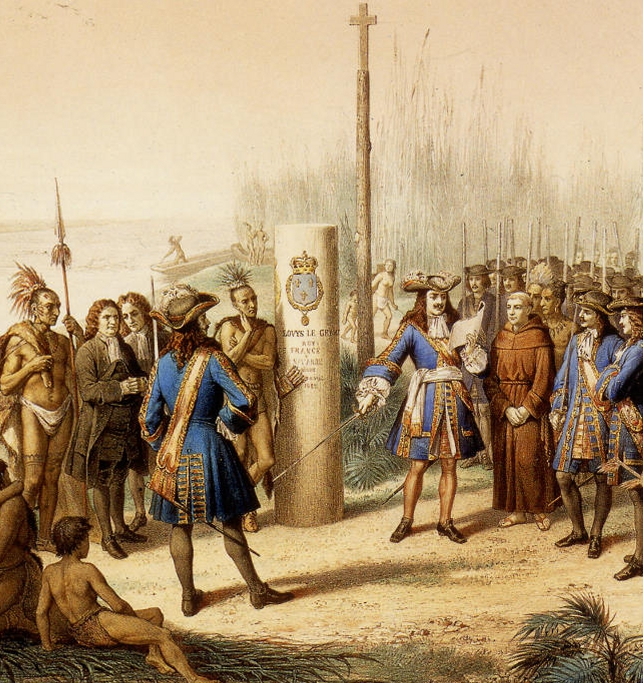
Taking up of the Louisiana by La Salle in the name of the Kingdom of France

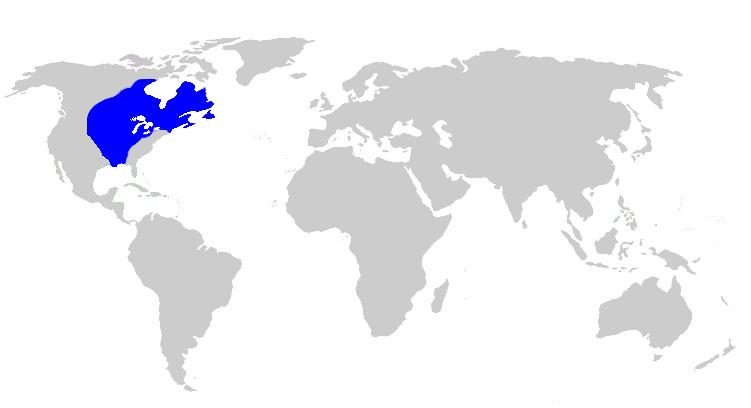
New France at its greatest extent in 1710.

- Present-day Canada
  - New France (1534–1763)
- Present-day United States
  - The Fort Saint Louis (Texas) (1685–1689)
  - Saint Croix, U.S. Virgin Islands (1650–1733)
  - Fort Caroline in French Florida (occupation by Huguenots) (1562–1565)
  - Vincennes and Fort Ouiatenon in Indiana
  - French Louisiana
  - Louisiana (New France) (1672–1764, 1801–1803)
- Present-day Brazil
  - France Équinoxiale (Bay of São Luis) (1610–1615)
  - The island of Saint Alexis (1531)
  - France Antarctique, to Fort Coligny (Rio de Janeiro Bay; intended as a haven for Huguenots) (1555–1567)
  - Île Delphine's island (1736–1737)
- Present-day Haiti
  - St. Domingue (1627–1804)
- Present-day Dominican Republic (1795–1809)
- Present-day Suriname
  - Tapanahony (District of Sipaliwini) (Controversial Franco-Dutch in favour of the Netherlands) (25.8% of the current territory) (1814)
- Present-day Saint Kitts and Nevis
  - Saint Christopher Island (1628–1690, 1698–1702, 1706, 1782–1783)
  - Nevis (1782–1784)
- Present-day Antigua and Barbuda
  - Antigua (briefly in 1666)
- Present-day Trinidad and Tobago
  - Tobago (1666–1667, 1781–1793, 1802–1803)
- Dominica (1625–1763, 1778–1783)
- Grenada (1650–1762, 1779–1783)
- Saint Vincent and the Grenadines (1719–1763, 1779–1783)
- Saint Lucia (1650–1723, 1756–1778, 1784–1803)
- Montserrat (1666, 1712)
- Falkland Islands (1504, 1701, 1764–1767)
- Îles des Saintes (1648–present)
- Marie-Galante (1635–present)
- La Désirade (1635–present)
- Guadeloupe (1635–present)
- Martinique (1635–present)
- French Guiana (1604–present)
- Saint Pierre and Miquelon (1604–1713, 1763–present)
- Collectivity of Saint Martin (1624–present)
- Saint Barthélemy (1648–1784, 1878–present)
- Clipperton Island (1858–present)

== In Southern Europe ==
- Malta (1798–1800)
- Autonomous Province of Korçë (1916-1920)

== In Africa ==
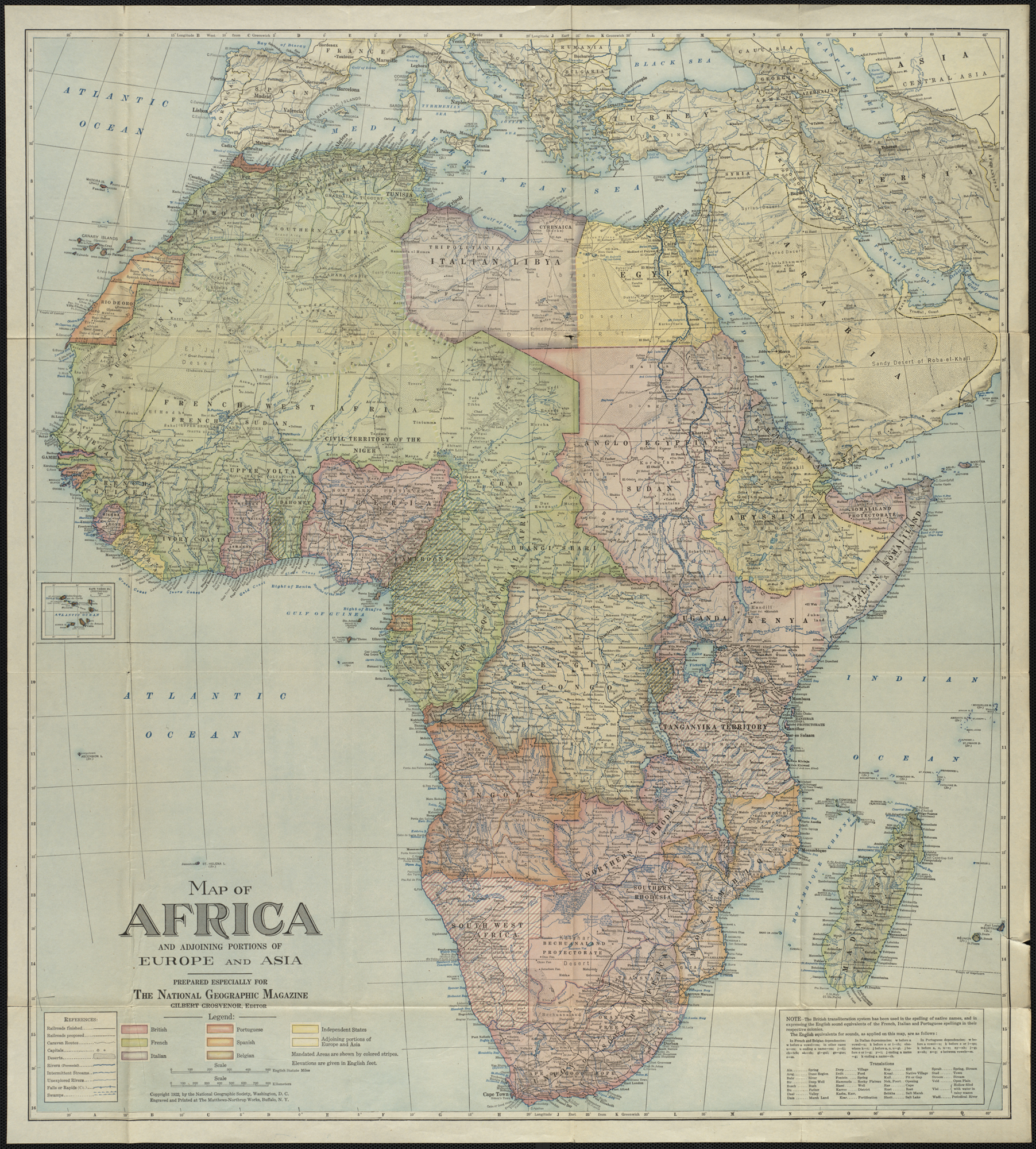
Map of French colonies in Africa (in green)

=== French North Africa ===
- Egypt (1798–1801)
- French Algeria (1830–1962; territorial department directly integrated into France itself from 1848 until independence)
- Protectorate of Tunisia (1881–1956)
- Protectorate in Morocco (1912–1956)

=== French West Africa ===
- Liberia Liberia Boundary Treaty was signed
- French Guinea (1847–1958)
- Ivory Coast (1843–1960)
- Dahomey or French Dahomey (now Benin) (1883–1960)
  - Independent of Dahomey, under French protectorate in 1889
  - Porto-Novo (protectorate) (1863–1865, 1882)
  - Cotonou (protectorate) (1868)
- French Sudan (now Mali) (1883–1960)
  - Senegambia and Niger (1902–1904)
- Mauritania (1902–1960)
  - Adrar emirate (protectorate) (1909)
  - The Tagant confederation's emirate (protectorate) (1905)
  - Brakna confederation's emirate (protectorate)
  - Emirate of Trarza (protectorate) (1902)
- Niger (1890–1960)
  - Sultanate of Damagaram (Zinder) (protectorate) (1899)
- Senegal (1677–1960)
- French Upper Volta (now Burkina Faso) (1896–1960)
- French Togoland (1918–1960) (formerly a German colony, mandate became a French colony) (now Togo)
- Nigeria
  - The Enclaves of Forcados and Badjibo (territory under a lease of 30 years) (1900–1927)
  - The Emirate of Muri (Northeast of Nigeria) (1892–1893)
- Gambia
  - Albreda (1681–1857)
  - Kunta Kinteh Island (1695–1697, 1702)

=== French Equatorial Africa ===
- Chad (1900–1960)
- Oubangui-Chari (currently Central African Republic) (1905–1960)
  - Dar al Kuti (protectorate) (1897) (in 1912 its sultanate was suppressed by the French)
  - Sultanate of Bangassou (protectorate) (1894)
- Present-day The Republic of Congo, then French Congo (1875–1960)
- Gabon (1839–1960)
- French Cameroon (91% of current Cameroon) (1918–1960) (formerly a German colony, Mandate, Trust Territory)
- São Tomé and Príncipe (1709)

=== East Africa and Indian Ocean ===
- Madagascar (1896–1960)
  - Kingdom of Imerina (protectorate) (1896)
- Isle de France (1715–1810) (now Mauritius)
- Djibouti (French Somaliland) (the French Territory of the Afars and the Issas) (French Somalia) (1862–1977)
- Mayotte (1841–present)
- Seychelles (1756–1810)
- Chagos Archipelago (1721–1745, 1768–1814)
- The Scattered Islands (Banc du Geyser, Bassas da India, Europa Island, Juan de Nova Island, Glorioso Islands, Tromelin Island)
- Comoros (1866–1975)
- Réunion (1710–present)

== In Asia ==
- French Indochina
  - French Indochinese Union (1887–1954)
    - Cambodia (protectorate) (1863–1953)
    - Laos (protectorate) (1893–1953)
    - Vietnam
      - Cochinchina (Southern Vietnam) (1862–1949)
      - Annam (protectorate) (Central Vietnam) (1883–1945)
      - Tonkin (protectorate) (Northern Vietnam) (1884–1945) including Guangzhou wan
      - State of Vietnam (1949–1954)
      - Spratly Islands (1933–1939)
      - Paracel Islands (1933–1939)
    - Some territories in the eastern part of Thailand (independent state, but after Franco-Siamese conflict of 1893, Thailand has lost 3 provinces during the next 15 years)
      - Chanthaburi Province (1893-1904)
      - Trat Province (1904-1907)
      - Former French colonies in Southeast Asia.
        Dan Sai District (in the area of the Loei Province: 1903-1907)
- India
  - French Establishments of India, composed of Pondichéry (1765–1954); Karikal (1725–1954); Mahé (1721–1954) Yanaon (1723–1954); Chandannagar (1673–1952)
- China
  - The territory of Kouang-Tchéou-Wan, a dependency of French Indochina (1898–1945)
- Syria or French Syria (1920–1946) (French Mandate for Syria and the Lebanon)

== In Oceania ==
- French Polynesia
  - Society Islands (became a French protectorate in 1843 and a colony in 1880)
    - Otaheiti, known as Tahiti (protectorate) (1842–1880)
    - Raiatea and Tahaa (protectorate) (1880)
  - Tuamotu Archipelago
  - Marquesas Islands (under French control in 1870, and later incorporated into the territory of French Polynesia)
  - Gambier Islands
    - Mangareva (protectorate) (1844/1871)
  - Austral Islands
    - Rurutu (Austral Islands) (protectorate) (1858–1889)
- Papua New Guinea
  - New Ireland (1880–1882) (attempt at colonization, unofficial)
- New Caledonia (1853–present)
- The New Hebrides (Vanuatu)
  - Anglo-French condominium (1906–1980)
- Australia
  - Dirk Hartog Island (1772) (made an unofficial annexation for all Australia)
- Wallis and Futuna (1887–present)

== In Antarctica ==
Territory claim by France in Antarctic (Adélie Land)

- French Southern and Antarctic Lands (TAAF)
  - Crozet Islands (24 January 1772– present)
  - Kerguelen Islands (13 February 1772– present)
  - Île Amsterdam (in 1843 but abandoned) (1892–present)
  - Île Saint-Paul (in 1843 but abandoned) (1892–present)
  - Adélie Land (1840–present) (sheltering one of two French Bases in Antarctica, the other one being Franco-Italian) (that borders with the Australian Antarctic Territory on both sides and divides that in two)

== See also ==
- First French Empire
- Second French Empire
- CFA franc
- Franco-Trarzan War of 1825
- French Africa
- French colonial flags
- French Colonial Union
- French colonization of the Americas
- Kouang-Tchéou-Wan – a small French territory in China
- Cheikh Saïd - a peninsula in Yemen mistaken for a French colony
- List of French client states
- Organisation internationale de la Francophonie
- Overseas France
- Timeline of the European colonization of North America
- Troupes coloniales – French colonial forces
