= List of sovereign states in the 2010s =

This is a list of sovereign states in the 2010s, giving an overview of states around the world during the period between 1 January 2010 and 31 December 2019. It contains 212 entries, arranged alphabetically, with information on the status and recognition of their sovereignty. It includes 195 widely recognized sovereign states, 2 associated states, and 15 entities which claim an effective sovereignty but are considered de facto constituents of other powers by the general international community.

Map of the World in 2013

== Members or observers of the United Nations ==
Name and capital city	Information on status and recognition of sovereignty
=== A ===
→ Afghanistan – Islamic Republic of Afghanistan; Capital: Kabul	Widely recognized UN member state.
Albania – Republic of Albania; Capital: Tirana	Widely recognized UN member state.
Algeria – People's Democratic Republic of Algeria; Capital: Algiers	Widely recognized UN member state.
Andorra – Principality of Andorra; Capital: Andorra la Vella	Widely recognized UN member state. The President of France and Bishop of Urgell were ex officio Co-Princes of Andorra. The defense of Andorra was the responsibility of France and Spain.
Angola – Republic of Angola; Capital: Luanda	Widely recognized UN member state.
Antigua and Barbuda; Capital: St. John's	Widely recognized UN member state; Commonwealth realm. Antigua and Barbuda had two dependencies, Barbuda and Redonda.
→ Argentina – Argentine Republic (Note: The name "Argentine Nation" is also used for the purposes of legislation.); Capital: Buenos Aires	Widely recognized UN member state. Argentina was a federation of 23 provinces and an autonomous city. It had a claim over Argentine Antarctica, which is suspended under the Antarctic Treaty. It also claimed the Falkland Islands and South Georgia and the South Sandwich Islands, both of which were British overseas territories.
Armenia – Republic of Armenia; Capital: Yerevan	Widely recognized UN member state. (Note: Armenia is not recognized by Pakistan.)
Australia – Commonwealth of Australia; Capital: Canberra	Widely recognized UN member state; Commonwealth realm. Australia was a federation of six states and three territories. It had sovereignty over the following external territories: Ashmore and Cartier Islands; Australian Antarctic Territory (suspended under the Antarctic Treaty.); Christmas Island; Cocos (Keeling) Islands; Coral Sea Islands; Heard Island and McDonald Islands; Norfolk Island
→ Austria – Republic of Austria; Capital: Vienna	Widely recognized UN member state. EU member. Austria was a federation of nine states.
→ Azerbaijan – Republic of Azerbaijan; Capital: Baku	Widely recognized UN member state. Azerbaijan had one autonomous republic, Nakhchivan. It included the disputed region of Nagorno-Karabakh, where a partially recognized breakaway republic had declared independence.
=== B ===
The Bahamas – Commonwealth of the Bahamas; Capital: Nassau	Widely recognized UN member state; Commonwealth realm.
Bahrain – Kingdom of Bahrain; Capital: Manama	Widely recognized UN member state.
Bangladesh – People's Republic of Bangladesh; Capital: Dhaka	Widely recognized UN member state.
Barbados; Capital: Bridgetown	Widely recognized UN member state; Commonwealth realm.
→ Belarus – Republic of Belarus; Capital: Minsk	Widely recognized UN member state.
Belgium – Kingdom of Belgium; Capital: Brussels	Widely recognized UN member state. EU member. Belgium was a federation of three communities and three regions.
→ Belize; Capital: Belmopan	Widely recognized UN member state; Commonwealth realm.
Benin – Republic of Benin; Capital: Porto-Novo (official), Cotonou (seat of government)	Widely recognized UN member state.
Bhutan – Kingdom of Bhutan; Capital: Thimphu	Widely recognized UN member state.
Bolivia – Plurinational State of Bolivia; Capital: Sucre (official), La Paz (administrative)	Widely recognized UN member state.
Bosnia and Herzegovina; Capital: Sarajevo	Widely recognized UN member state. Bosnia and Herzegovina was a federation of two constituent entities: the Federation of Bosnia and Herzegovina, which was itself a federation of ten cantons, and Republika Srpska.
Botswana – Republic of Botswana; Capital: Gaborone	Widely recognized UN member state.
Brazil – Federative Republic of Brazil; Capital: Brasília	Widely recognized UN member state. Brazil was a federation of 26 states and one federal district.
Brunei – Nation of Brunei, Abode of Peace; Capital: Bandar Seri Begawan	Widely recognized UN member state. Brunei claimed part of the Spratly Islands (disputed by the People's Republic of China, the Republic of China, Vietnam, the Philippines, and Malaysia).
Bulgaria – Republic of Bulgaria; Capital: Sofia	Widely recognized UN member state. EU member.
Burkina Faso; Capital: Ouagadougou: Burkina Faso (to 31 October 2014); Burkina Faso (from 31 October 2014)	Widely recognized UN member state.
Burma → Myanmar
Burundi – Republic of Burundi; Capital: Bujumbura (to 24 December 2018), Gitega (from 24 December 2018)	Widely recognized UN member state.
=== C ===
Cambodia – Kingdom of Cambodia; Capital: Phnom Penh	Widely recognized UN member state.
Cameroon – Republic of Cameroon; Capital: Yaoundé	Widely recognized UN member state.
Canada; Capital: Ottawa	Widely recognized UN member state; Commonwealth realm. Canada was a federation of ten provinces and three territories.
Cape Verde; Capital: Praia: Republic of Cape Verde (to 24 October 2013); Republic of Cabo Verde (from 24 October 2013)	Widely recognized UN member state.
Central African Republic; Capital: Bangui	Widely recognized UN member state.
Chad – Republic of Chad; Capital: N'Djamena	Widely recognized UN member state.
Chile – Republic of Chile; Capital: Santiago	Widely recognized UN member state. Chile had two special territories: Easter Island and the Juan Fernández Islands. It had a claim over Chilean Antarctic Territory, which was suspended under the Antarctic Treaty.
China – People's Republic of China; Capital: Beijing	Widely recognized UN member state (Note: The People's Republic of China and the Republic of China do not recognize each other, as both states claims to be the sole legitimate government of China. The following states had recognized the ROC instead of the PRC as of October 2019: Belize, Guatemala, Haiti, Honduras, Marshall Islands, Nauru, Nicaragua, Palau, Paraguay, Saint Kitts and Nevis, Saint Lucia, Saint Vincent and the Grenadines, Swaziland, Tuvalu, and Vatican City.) . The People's Republic of China had five autonomous regions: Guangxi, Inner Mongolia, Ningxia, Xinjiang and Tibet. Additionally, it had sovereignty over two special administrative regions: Hong Kong; Macau; The People's Republic of China claimed Taiwan, Kinmen, the Matsu Islands, Pratas Island and the Vereker Banks, and Itu Aba, which were governed by the Republic of China. It also claimed the Paracel Islands (disputed by the Republic of China and Vietnam), the Spratly Islands (disputed by the Republic of China, Vietnam, the Philippines, Malaysia and Brunei), and South Tibet (controlled by India). The People's Republic of China administered Aksai Chin and the Trans-Karakoram Tract, which were within the disputed region of Kashmir.
Colombia – Republic of Colombia; Capital: Bogotá	Widely recognized UN member state. Colombia administered Serranilla Bank and claimed Bajo Nuevo Bank (disputed by Nicaragua and the United States)
Comoros – Union of the Comoros; Capital: Moroni	Widely recognized UN member state. The Comoros was a federation of three islands autonomous islands: Grande Comore, Mohéli, and Anjouan. Comoros also claimed sovereignty over the French territory, then department of Mayotte, and the French-administered Glorioso Islands and Banc du Geyser (the latter two also disputed by Madagascar).
Congo, Democratic Republic of the Capital: Kinshasa	Widely recognized UN member state.
Congo, Republic of the Capital: Brazzaville	Widely recognized UN member state.
Costa Rica – Republic of Costa Rica; Capital: San José	Widely recognized UN member state.
Côte d'Ivoire → Ivory Coast
Croatia – Republic of Croatia; Capital: Zagreb	Widely recognized UN member state. EU member (from 1 July 2013).
Cuba – Republic of Cuba; Capital: Havana	Widely recognized UN member state. The Cuban area of Guantánamo Bay was under the permanent control of the United States.
Cyprus – Republic of Cyprus; Capital: Nicosia	Widely recognized UN member state. (Note: Cyprus is not recognized by Turkey or Northern Cyprus.) EU member. The northeastern part of the island was the de facto independent state of Northern Cyprus, recognized only by Turkey.
Czech Republic; Capital: Prague	Widely recognized UN member state. EU member.
=== D ===
Denmark – Kingdom of Denmark; Capital: Copenhagen	Widely recognized UN member state. EU member. The Kingdom of Denmark also included two autonomous countries: Greenland; Faroe Islands
Djibouti – Republic of Djibouti; Capital: Djibouti	Widely recognized UN member state.
Dominica – Commonwealth of Dominica; Capital: Roseau	Widely recognized UN member state.
Dominican Republic; Capital: Santo Domingo	Widely recognized UN member state.
=== E ===
East Timor (Note: Also known as "Timor-Leste".) – Democratic Republic of Timor-Leste; Capital: Dili	Widely recognized UN member state.
Ecuador – Republic of Ecuador; Capital: Quito	Widely recognized UN member state.
Egypt – Arab Republic of Egypt; Capital: Cairo: Arab Republic of Egypt (to 11 February 2011); Arab Republic of Egypt (from 11 February 2011)	Widely recognized UN member state.
El Salvador – Republic of El Salvador; Capital: San Salvador	Widely recognized UN member state.
Equatorial Guinea – Republic of Equatorial Guinea; Capital: Malabo	Widely recognized UN member state.
Eritrea – State of Eritrea; Capital: Asmara	Widely recognized UN member state.
Estonia – Republic of Estonia; Capital: Tallinn	Widely recognized UN member state. EU member.
Eswatini / Swaziland; Capital: Mbabane (administrative), Lobamba (royal and legislative): Kingdom of Swaziland (to 19 April 2018); Kingdom of Eswatini (from 19 April 2018)	Widely recognized UN member state.
Ethiopia – Federal Democratic Republic of Ethiopia; Capital: Addis Ababa	Widely recognized UN member state. Ethiopia was a federation of nine regions and two chartered cities.
=== F ===
Fiji; Capital: Suva: Republic of the Fiji Islands (to 2 February 2011); Republic of Fiji (from 2 February 2011)	Widely recognized UN member state. Fiji had an autonomous dependency, Rotuma.
Finland – Republic of Finland; Capital: Helsinki	Widely recognized UN member state. EU member. Finland had a neutral and demilitarised region: Åland
France – French Republic; Capital: Paris	Widely recognized UN member state. EU member. France included five (four until 31 March 2011) overseas departments: French Guiana, Guadeloupe, Martinique, Mayotte (from 31 March 2011, disputed by Comoros) and Réunion. It also had sovereignty over the following overseas territories: Clipperton Island; French Polynesia; French Southern and Antarctic Lands (including a claim to Adélie Land which was suspended under the Antarctic Treaty.); Mayotte (to 31 March 2011, disputed by Comoros); New Caledonia; Saint-Barthélemy; Saint Martin; Saint Pierre and Miquelon; French Southern and Antarctic Lands (district of Scattered Islands in the Indian Ocean): Bassas da India (disputed by Madagascar); Europa Island (disputed by Madagascar); Glorioso Islands (disputed by Madagascar and Comoros); Juan de Nova Island (disputed by Madagascar); Tromelin Island (disputed by Mauritius); Wallis and Futuna; France also claimed Banc du Geyser (disputed by Madagascar and Comoros).
=== G ===
Gabon – Gabonese Republic; Capital: Libreville	Widely recognized UN member state.
The Gambia; Capital: Banjul: Republic of The Gambia (to 11 December 2015, from 29 January 2017); Islamic Republic of The Gambia (from 11 December 2015 to 29 January 2017)	Widely recognized UN member state.
Georgia; Capital: Tbilisi	Widely recognized UN member state. Georgia had two autonomous republics: Adjara and Abkhazia. The latter republic was controlled by a de facto independent state. Georgia also included the disputed region of South Ossetia, where a partially recognized breakaway republic had declared independence.
Germany – Federal Republic of Germany; Capital: Berlin	Widely recognized UN member state. EU member. Germany was a federation of sixteen states.
Ghana – Republic of Ghana; Capital: Accra	Widely recognized UN member state.
Greece – Hellenic Republic; Capital: Athens	Widely recognized UN member state. EU member. Greece had sovereignty over Mount Athos, an autonomous monastic state that was jointly governed by the multi-national "Holy Community" on the mountain and the Civil Governor appointed by the Greek Ministry of Foreign Affairs, and spiritually under the direct jurisdiction of the Ecumenical Patriarchate.
Grenada; Capital: St. George's	Widely recognized UN member state; Commonwealth realm. Grenada had one autonomous dependency, Carriacou and Petite Martinique.
Guatemala – Republic of Guatemala; Capital: Guatemala City	Widely recognized UN member state.
Guinea – Republic of Guinea; Capital: Conakry	Widely recognized UN member state.
Guinea-Bissau – Republic of Guinea-Bissau; Capital: Bissau	Widely recognized UN member state.
Guyana – Co-operative Republic of Guyana; Capital: Georgetown	Widely recognized UN member state.
=== H ===
Haiti – Republic of Haiti; Capital: Port-au-Prince	Widely recognized UN member state. Haiti claimed the uninhabited United States possession of Navassa Island.
Holy See → Vatican City
Honduras – Republic of Honduras; Capital: Tegucigalpa	Widely recognized UN member state.
Hungary; Capital: Budapest: Republic of Hungary (to 1 January 2012); Hungary (from 1 January 2012)	Widely recognized UN member state. EU member.
=== I ===
Iceland – Republic of Iceland; Capital: Reykjavík	Widely recognized UN member state.
India – Republic of India; Capital: New Delhi	Widely recognized UN member state. India was a federation of twenty-nine states and seven union territories. Indian sovereignty over South Tibet was disputed by the People's Republic of China. India administered part of the disputed region of Kashmir as the state of Jammu and Kashmir.
Indonesia – Republic of Indonesia; Capital: Jakarta	Widely recognized UN member state. Indonesia had five special provinces: Aceh, Jakarta, Papua, West Papua, and Yogyakarta.
Iran – Islamic Republic of Iran; Capital: Tehran	Widely recognized UN member state.
Iraq – Republic of Iraq; Capital: Baghdad	Widely recognized UN member state. Iraq was constitutionally designated as a federation of autonomous regions, but only one region (Iraqi Kurdistan) had been established.
Ireland – Republic of Ireland; Capital: Dublin	Widely recognized UN member state. EU member.
Israel – State of Israel; Capital: Jerusalem	Widely recognized UN member state. (Note: Israel was not recognized by Afghanistan, Algeria, Bahrain, Bangladesh, Chad, Cuba, Indonesia, Iran, Iraq, Kuwait, Lebanon, Libya, Malaysia, North Korea, Pakistan, Saudi Arabia, Sudan, Syria, the United Arab Emirates, or Yemen.) Israel occupied East Jerusalem, the Gaza Strip, the Golan Heights, and the West Bank. These areas were not generally recognized as being part of Israel.
Italy – Italian Republic; Capital: Rome	Widely recognized UN member state. EU member. Italy had 5 autonomous regions: Aosta Valley, Friuli-Venezia Giulia, Sardinia, Sicily, and Trentino-Alto Adige/Südtirol.
Ivory Coast – Republic of Côte d'Ivoire; Capital: Yamoussoukro (official), Abidjan (seat of government)	Widely recognized UN member state.
=== J ===
Jamaica; Capital: Kingston	Widely recognized UN member state; Commonwealth realm.
Japan; Capital: Tokyo	Widely recognized UN member state.
Jordan – Hashemite Kingdom of Jordan; Capital: Amman	Widely recognized UN member state.
=== K ===
Kazakhstan – Republic of Kazakhstan; Capital: Astana (renamed Nur-Sultan on 20 March 2019)	Widely recognized UN member state.
Kenya – Republic of Kenya; Capital: Nairobi	Widely recognized UN member state.
Kiribati – Republic of Kiribati; Capital: South Tarawa	Widely recognized UN member state.
Korea, North – Democratic People's Republic of Korea; Capital: Pyongyang	Widely recognized UN member state. (Note: North Korea was not recognized by Taiwan, Estonia, France, Japan, or South Korea.) It claimed to be the sole legitimate government of Korea.
→ Korea, South – Republic of Korea; Capital: Seoul	Widely recognized UN member state. (Note: South Korea was not recognized by North Korea.) South Korea had one autonomous region, Jeju-do. It claimed to be the sole legitimate government of Korean Peninsula.
Kuwait – State of Kuwait; Capital: Kuwait City	Widely recognized UN member state.
Kyrgyzstan – Kyrgyz Republic; Capital: Bishkek	Widely recognized UN member state.
=== L ===
Laos – Lao People's Democratic Republic; Capital: Vientiane	Widely recognized UN member state.
Latvia – Republic of Latvia; Capital: Riga	Widely recognized UN member state. EU member.
Lebanon – Lebanese Republic; Capital: Beirut	Widely recognized UN member state.
Lesotho – Kingdom of Lesotho; Capital: Maseru	Widely recognized UN member state.
Liberia – Republic of Liberia; Capital: Monrovia	Widely recognized UN member state.
→ Libya Capital: Tripoli (disputed, from 29 August 2011 to 23 October 2011), Sirte (disputed, from 29 August 2011 to 23 October 2011): Great Socialist People's Libyan Arab Jamahiriya (to 23 October 2011); National Transitional Council (from 27 February 2011 to 8 August 2012); Libya (from 8 August 2012 to 8 January 2013); State of Libya (from 8 January 2013)	Widely recognized UN member state. Control passed due to civil war between 15 February 2011 and de facto 20 October 2011, de jure 23 October 2011.
Liechtenstein – Principality of Liechtenstein; Capital: Vaduz	Widely recognized UN member state. The defense of Liechtenstein was the responsibility of Switzerland.
Lithuania – Republic of Lithuania; Capital: Vilnius	Widely recognized UN member state. EU member.
Luxembourg – Grand Duchy of Luxembourg; Capital: Luxembourg	Widely recognized UN member state. EU member.
=== M ===
Macedonia → North Macedonia
Madagascar; Capital: Antananarivo: Republic of Madagascar (to 11 December 2010); Republic of Madagascar (from 11 December 2010)	Widely recognized UN member state. Madagascar claimed the French possessions of Bassas da India, Europa Island, Glorioso Islands (also disputed by Comoros), Juan de Nova Island, and Banc du Geyser (also disputed by Comoros)
→ → Malawi – Republic of Malawi; Capital: Lilongwe	Widely recognized UN member state.
Malaysia; Capital: Kuala Lumpur (official), Putrajaya (administrative)	Widely recognized UN member state. Malaysia was a federation of thirteen states and three federal territories. Malaysia claimed part of the Spratly Islands (disputed by the People's Republic of China, the Republic of China, Vietnam, the Philippines, and Brunei).
Maldives – Republic of Maldives; Capital: Malé	Widely recognized UN member state.
Mali – Republic of Mali; Capital: Bamako	Widely recognized UN member state. Part of Mali's territory was controlled by the de facto State of Azawad from 6 April 2012 to 12 July 2012.
Malta – Republic of Malta; Capital: Valletta	Widely recognized UN member state. EU member.
Marshall Islands – Republic of the Marshall Islands; Capital: Majuro	Widely recognized UN member state under Compact of Free Association with the United States. The Marshall Islands claimed the United States territory of Wake Island.
→ Mauritania – Islamic Republic of Mauritania; Capital: Nouakchott	Widely recognized UN member state.
Mauritius – Republic of Mauritius; Capital: Port Louis	Widely recognized UN member state. Mauritius had one autonomous dependency, Rodrigues, and two other dependencies, Agalega Islands and Cargados Carajos. It claimed the British Indian Ocean Territory and the French territory of Tromelin Island.
Mexico – United Mexican States; Capital: Mexico City	Widely recognized UN member state. Mexico was a federation of 31 states and one federal district.
Federated States of Micronesia; Capital: Palikir	Widely recognized UN member state under Compact of Free Association with the United States. The FSM was a federation of four states.
→ Moldova – Republic of Moldova; Capital: Chişinău	Widely recognized UN member state. Moldova had two autonomous territorial units: Gagauzia and Transnistria; the latter was controlled by a de facto independent state.
Monaco – Principality of Monaco; Capital: Monaco	Widely recognized UN member state. The defense of Monaco was the responsibility of France.
→ Mongolia; Capital: Ulaanbaatar	Widely recognized UN member state.
Montenegro; Capital: Podgorica	Widely recognized UN member state.
Morocco – Kingdom of Morocco; Capital: Rabat	Widely recognized UN member state. Morocco claimed sovereignty over Western Sahara, which was disputed and partially controlled by the de facto independent Sahrawi Arab Democratic Republic. Morocco disputed Spanish sovereignty over Ceuta, Isla de Alborán, Isla Perejil, Islas Chafarinas, Melilla, and Peñón de Alhucemas.
Mozambique – Republic of Mozambique; Capital: Maputo	Widely recognized UN member state.
→ Myanmar (Note: Commonly known in English as "Burma".); Capital: Naypyidaw: Union of Myanmar (to 31 January 2011); Republic of the Union of Myanmar (from 31 January 2011)	Widely recognized UN member state.
=== N ===
Namibia – Republic of Namibia; Capital: Windhoek	Widely recognized UN member state.
Nauru – Republic of Nauru; Capital: Yaren (unofficial, seat of parliament)	Widely recognized UN member state. The defense of Nauru was the responsibility of Australia.
Nepal – Federal Democratic Republic of Nepal; Capital: Kathmandu	Widely recognized UN member state. Nepal was a federation, and its seven provinces were created on 20 September 2015.
Netherlands – Kingdom of the Netherlands; Capital: Amsterdam (official), The Hague (seat of government)	Widely recognized UN member state. The Kingdom of the Netherlands consisted of four (three until October 2010) autonomous countries: Aruba; Netherlands; Netherlands Antilles (to 10 October 2010); Curaçao (from 10 October 2010); Sint Maarten (from 10 October 2010); It also had sovereignty over one non-autonomous region (consisting of three special municipalities that are part of the Netherlands): Caribbean Netherlands (from 10 October 2010); The Kingdom of the Netherlands, excluding Aruba, Curaçao, the Netherlands Antilles, Sint Maarten, and the Caribbean Netherlands, was a member of the EU.
New Zealand; Capital: Wellington	Widely recognized UN member state; Commonwealth realm. New Zealand had responsibilities for the two free associated states of: Cook Islands; Niue; It also had sovereignty over two dependent territories: Ross Dependency (suspended under the Antarctic Treaty); Tokelau; The government of Tokelau claimed Swains Island, part of American Samoa (a U.S. dependence). New Zealand did not recognize this claim.
Nicaragua – Republic of Nicaragua; Capital: Managua	Widely recognized UN member state. Nicaragua had two autonomous regions: the North Caribbean Coast Autonomous Region and South Caribbean Coast Autonomous Region. Until constitutional reforms in 2014, they were referred to as the North Atlantic Autonomous Region and South Atlantic Autonomous Region.
Niger – Republic of Niger; Capital: Niamey	Widely recognized UN member state.
Nigeria – Federal Republic of Nigeria; Capital: Abuja	Widely recognized UN member state. Nigeria was a federation of 36 states and one federal territory.
North Macedonia / Macedonia (Note: Provisionally referred to by the UN and a number of countries and international organizations as "the former Yugoslav Republic of Macedonia" until 2019; see Macedonia naming dispute.); Capital: Skopje: Republic of Macedonia (to 12 February 2019); Republic of North Macedonia (from 12 February 2019)	Widely recognized UN member state.
Norway – Kingdom of Norway; Capital: Oslo	Widely recognized UN member state. Norway had two integral overseas areas: Jan Mayen and Svalbard. The latter of area had a special status due to the Spitsbergen Treaty. Norway had sovereignty over the following dependencies: Bouvet Island; Peter I Island (suspended under the Antarctic Treaty); Queen Maud Land (suspended under the Antarctic Treaty)
=== O ===
Oman – Sultanate of Oman; Capital: Muscat	Widely recognized UN member state.
=== P ===
Pakistan – Islamic Republic of Pakistan; Capital: Islamabad	Widely recognized UN member state. Pakistan was a federation of four provinces and four territories. It administered part of the disputed region of Kashmir as the territories of Azad Kashmir and the autonomous territory of Gilgit-Baltistan.
Palau – Republic of Palau; Capital: Ngerulmud	Widely recognized UN member state under Compact of Free Association with the United States.
Palestine; Capital: Ramallah (administrative), Gaza City (administrative), Jerusalem (claims): Palestinian National Authority (to 3 January 2013); State of Palestine (from 2 January 2013)	Partially recognised de facto self-governing entity. (Note: Palestine was recognized by Afghanistan, Albania, Algeria, Angola, Antigua and Barbuda (from 22 September 2011), Argentina (from 6 December 2010), Azerbaijan, Bahrain, Bangladesh, Belarus, Belize (from 9 September 2011), Benin, Bhutan, Bolivia (from 22 December 2010), Bosnia and Herzegovina, Botswana, Brazil (from 1 December 2010), Brunei, Bulgaria, Burkina Faso, Burundi, Cambodia, Cape Verde, Chad, the Central African Republic, Chile (from 7 January 2011), China, Comoros, the Democratic Republic of the Congo, the Republic of the Congo, Costa Rica, Côte d'Ivoire, Cuba, Cyprus, Czech Republic, Djibouti, Dominica (from 14 September 2011), the Dominican Republic, East Timor, Ecuador (from 24 December 2010), Egypt, El Salvador (from 25 August 2011), Equatorial Guinea, Ethiopia, Gabon, Gambia, Georgia, Ghana, Grenada (from 25 September 2011), Guatemala (from 9 April 2013), Guinea, Guinea-Bissau, Guyana (from 13 January 2011), Haiti (27 September 2013), Holy See (February 2013), Honduras (from 26 August 2011), Hungary, Iceland (from 15 December 2011), India, Indonesia, Iraq, Iran, Jordan, Kazakhstan, Kenya, Kuwait, Kyrgyzstan, Laos, Lebanon, Lesotho (from 6 June 2011), Liberia (from July 2011), Libya, Madagascar, Malawi, Malaysia, Maldives, Mali, Malta, Mauritania, Mauritius, Mongolia, Montenegro, Morocco, Mozambique, Namibia, Nepal, Nicaragua, Niger, Nigeria, North Korea, Oman, Pakistan, Papua New Guinea, Paraguay, Peru (from 24 January 2011), the Philippines, Poland, Qatar, Romania, Russia, Rwanda, Saint Lucia (14 September 2015), Saint Vincent and the Grenadines (from 29 August 2011), São Tomé and Príncipe, Saudi Arabia, Senegal, Serbia, Seychelles, Sierra Leone, Slovakia, Somalia, South Africa, Sri Lanka, Sudan, Suriname (from 1 February 2011), Swaziland, Sweden (30 October 2014), Syria (from 18 July 2011), Tajikistan, Tanzania, Thailand (from 18 January 2012), Togo, Tunisia, Turkey, Turkmenistan, Uganda, Ukraine, the United Arab Emirates, Uruguay (from 15 March 2011), Uzbekistan, Vanuatu, Venezuela, Vietnam, Yemen, Zambia, and Zimbabwe.) Palestine claimed sovereignty over a disputed region consisting of three Israeli-occupied territories: the West Bank, the Gaza Strip, and East Jerusalem. In foreign relations, Palestine was represented by the Palestine Liberation Organization, which was a permanent observer at the United Nations (to 29 November 2012). Permanent observer at the United Nations (since 29 November 2012). The Palestinian National Authority was an interim administrative body that exercised limited control over parts of the West Bank and the Gaza Strip. Gaza was under the control of Hamas.
Panama – Republic of Panama; Capital: Panama City	Widely recognized UN member state.
Papua New Guinea – Independent State of Papua New Guinea; Capital: Port Moresby	Widely recognized UN member state; Commonwealth realm. Papua New Guinea had one autonomous region, Bougainville.
→ Paraguay – Republic of Paraguay; Capital: Asunción	Widely recognized UN member state.
Peru – Republic of Peru; Capital: Lima	Widely recognized UN member state.
Philippines – Republic of the Philippines; Capital: Manila	Widely recognized UN member state. The Philippines had one autonomous region: Muslim Mindanao (until 2019), Bangsamoro (since 2019). The Philippines administered Scarborough Shoal, which was disputed by the People's Republic of China and the Republic of China. It also claimed sovereignty over the Spratly Islands (disputed by China, Taiwan, Vietnam, Brunei, and Malaysia) and the Malaysian territory of Sabah.
Poland – Republic of Poland; Capital: Warsaw	Widely recognized UN member state. EU member.
Portugal – Portuguese Republic; Capital: Lisbon	Widely recognized UN member state. EU member. Portugal had two autonomous regions, the Azores and Madeira. Portugal claimed the Spanish municipalities of Olivenza and Táliga.
=== Q ===
Qatar – State of Qatar; Capital: Doha	Widely recognized UN member state.
=== R ===
Romania; Capital: Bucharest	Widely recognized UN member state. EU member.
Russia – Russian Federation; Capital: Moscow	Widely recognized UN member state. Russia was a federation of 22 republics, 46 oblasts, 9 krais, 3 federal cities, 1 autonomous oblast, and 4 autonomous okrugs. Republic of Crimea and the city of Sevastopol, annexed in 2014, were recognized as a part of Ukraine by most of the international community.
Rwanda – Republic of Rwanda; Capital: Kigali	Widely recognized UN member state.
=== S ===
Saint Kitts and Nevis – Federation of Saint Kitts and Nevis; Capital: Basseterre	Widely recognized UN member state; Commonwealth realm. Saint Kitts and Nevis was a federation of fourteen parishes within two island. It had one autonomous island, Nevis.
Saint Lucia; Capital: Castries	Widely recognized UN member state; Commonwealth realm.
Saint Vincent and the Grenadines; Capital: Kingstown	Widely recognized UN member state; Commonwealth realm.
Samoa – Independent State of Samoa; Capital: Apia	Widely recognized UN member state.
→ San Marino – Republic of San Marino; Capital: San Marino	Widely recognized UN member state.
São Tomé and Príncipe – Democratic Republic of São Tomé and Príncipe; Capital: São Tomé	Widely recognized UN member state. São Tomé and Príncipe had one autonomous province, Príncipe.
Saudi Arabia – Kingdom of Saudi Arabia; Capital: Riyadh	Widely recognized UN member state.
Senegal – Republic of Senegal; Capital: Dakar	Widely recognized UN member state.
→ Serbia – Republic of Serbia; Capital: Belgrade	Widely recognized UN member state. Serbia had two autonomous provinces: Vojvodina and Kosovo and Metohija. The latter was governed by the United Nations Interim Administration Mission in Kosovo. Kosovo declared independence in 2008, and was a partially recognized de facto independent republic.
Seychelles – Republic of Seychelles; Capital: Victoria	Widely recognized UN member state. The Seychelles claimed the British Indian Ocean Territory.
Sierra Leone – Republic of Sierra Leone; Capital: Freetown	Widely recognized UN member state.
Singapore – Republic of Singapore; Capital: Singapore	Widely recognized UN member state.
Slovakia – Slovak Republic; Capital: Bratislava	Widely recognized UN member state. EU member.
Slovenia – Republic of Slovenia; Capital: Ljubljana	Widely recognized UN member state. EU member.
Solomon Islands; Capital: Honiara	Widely recognized UN member state; Commonwealth realm.
Somalia; Capital: Mogadishu: Somalia (to 1 August 2012) (Note: The Transitional Federal Government was overthrowed on 20 August 2012.); Federal Republic of Somalia (from 1 August 2012)	Widely recognized UN member state. Over the course of the Somali Civil War, several autonomous regional governments were established in the de jure territory of Somalia. Although these states did not claim independence from Somalia, they were de facto self-governing: Ahlu Sunna Waljama'a; al-Shabaab; Galmudug; Himan and Heeb; Hizbul Islam (to 20 December 2010); Jubaland/Azania; Puntland; There were also areas of the country which at various times had no effective government at all or that were ruled by local clans. In addition, there was one state that declared and established de facto independence from Somalia, Somaliland.
South Africa – Republic of South Africa; Capital: Pretoria (administrative), Cape Town (legislative), Bloemfontein (judicial)	Widely recognized UN member state.
South Sudan – Republic of South Sudan (from 9 July 2011); Capital: Juba	Widely recognized independent state. UN member state (from 14 July 2011). South Sudan was a federation of 10 states. It disputed Abyei with Sudan.
Spain – Kingdom of Spain; Capital: Madrid	Widely recognized UN member state. EU member. Spain was divided into seventeen autonomous communities and two autonomous cities. Its sovereignty over Ceuta, Isla de Alborán, Isla Perejil, Islas Chafarinas, Melilla and Peñón de Alhucemas was disputed by Morocco. Its sovereignty over Olivenza and Táliga was disputed by Portugal. It claimed the British overseas territory of Gibraltar.
Sri Lanka – Democratic Socialist Republic of Sri Lanka; Capital: Sri Jayawardenapura-Kotte (administrative), Colombo (commercial)	Widely recognized UN member state.
Sudan; Capital: Khartoum: Republic of the Sudan (to 10 April 2019); Republic of the Sudan (from 10 April 2019)	Widely recognized UN member state. Sudan was a federation of 25 states (later 15, then 17, then 18), ten of which formed South Sudan on 9 July 2011. It disputed Abyei with South Sudan
Suriname – Republic of Suriname; Capital: Paramaribo	Widely recognized UN member state.
Swaziland → Eswatini
Sweden – Kingdom of Sweden; Capital: Stockholm	Widely recognized UN member state. EU member.
Switzerland – Swiss Confederation; Capital: Bern	Widely recognized UN member state. Switzerland was a federation of 26 cantons.
Syria – Syrian Arab Republic; Capital: Damascus	Widely recognized UN member state. Syria included the Golan Heights, which were occupied by Israel. It disputed the Turkish sovereignty over Hatay Province. The Syrian Arab Republic was widely regarded as the legitimate authority of Syria, though control of its territory transferred between multiple groups during the Syrian civil war (from 15 March 2011).
=== T ===
Tajikistan – Republic of Tajikistan; Capital: Dushanbe	Widely recognized UN member state. Tajikistan had one autonomous province, Gorno-Badakhshan.
Tanzania – United Republic of Tanzania; Capital: Dodoma (official), Dar es Salaam (seat of government)	Widely recognized UN member state. Tanzania had one autonomous region, Zanzibar.
→ Thailand – Kingdom of Thailand; Capital: Bangkok	Widely recognized UN member state.
Timor-Leste → East Timor
Togo – Togolese Republic; Capital: Lomé	Widely recognized UN member state.
Tonga – Kingdom of Tonga; Capital: Nukuʻalofa	Widely recognized UN member state.
Trinidad and Tobago – Republic of Trinidad and Tobago; Capital: Port of Spain	Widely recognized UN member state. Trinidad and Tobago had one autonomous island, Tobago.
Tunisia – Tunisian Republic; Capital: Tunis	Widely recognized UN member state.
Turkey – Republic of Turkey; Capital: Ankara	Widely recognized UN member state.
Turkmenistan; Capital: Ashgabat	Widely recognized UN member state.
Tuvalu; Capital: Funafuti	Widely recognized UN member state; Commonwealth realm.
=== U ===
Uganda – Republic of Uganda; Capital: Kampala	Widely recognized UN member state.
Ukraine; Capital: Kyiv	Widely recognized UN member state. Ukraine had one autonomous republic: Crimea. Crimea and the city of Sevastopol were under de facto Russian control beginning in 2014.
United Arab Emirates; Capital: Abu Dhabi	Widely recognized UN member state. The United Arab Emirates was a federation of seven emirates.
United Kingdom – United Kingdom of Great Britain and Northern Ireland; Capital: London	Widely recognized UN member state; Commonwealth realm. EU member. The United Kingdom was composed of four countries: England, Northern Ireland, Scotland, and Wales. It had sovereignty over the following British overseas territories: Anguilla; Bermuda; British Antarctic Territory (suspended under the Antarctic Treaty); British Indian Ocean Territory (disputed by Mauritius and the Seychelles); British Virgin Islands; Cayman Islands; Falkland Islands (disputed by Argentina); Gibraltar (disputed by Spain); Montserrat; Pitcairn Islands; Saint Helena, Ascension and Tristan da Cunha; South Georgia and the South Sandwich Islands (disputed by Argentina); Sovereign Base Areas of Akrotiri and Dhekelia; Turks and Caicos Islands; In addition, the British Monarch (not the United Kingdom) had direct sovereignty over three self-governing Crown dependencies: Guernsey, with two dependencies: Alderney; Sark; Isle of Man; Jersey
United States – United States of America; Capital: Washington, D.C.	Widely recognized UN member state. The United States was a federation of 50 states, one federal district, and one incorporated territory. It had sovereignty over the following inhabited insular areas: American Samoa (including Swains Island, disputed by Tokelau); Guam; Northern Mariana Islands; Puerto Rico; United States Virgin Islands; It also had sovereignty over eight uninhabited unincorporated territories: These islands were sometimes designated for statistical purposes as the United States Minor Outlying Islands: Baker Island; Howland Island; Jarvis Island; Johnston Atoll; Kingman Reef; Midway Atoll; Navassa Island (claims by Haiti); Wake Island (claims by the Marshall Islands); The United States claimed Bajo Nuevo Bank and Serranilla Bank. Its claim to Serranilla was disputed by Colombia and Nicaragua and its claim to Bajo Nuevo was disputed by Colombia, Jamaica, and Nicaragua. Some government sources stated that these two areas were unincorporated territories of the United States.
Uruguay – Eastern Republic of Uruguay; Capital: Montevideo	Widely recognized UN member state.
Uzbekistan – Republic of Uzbekistan; Capital: Tashkent	Widely recognized UN member state. Uzbekistan had one autonomous republic: Karakalpakstan.
=== V ===
Vanuatu – Republic of Vanuatu; Capital: Port Vila	Widely recognized UN member state.
Vatican City – Vatican City State; Capital: Vatican City	Widely recognized independent state. Vatican City was administered by the Holy See, a sovereign entity recognized by a large number of countries and a Permanent observer at the United Nations. The Holy See also administered a number of extraterritorial properties in Italy. The Pope was the ex officio head of state of Vatican City.
Venezuela – Bolivarian Republic of Venezuela; Capital: Caracas	Widely recognized UN member state. Venezuela was a federation of 23 states, one federal dependency, and one federal district.
Vietnam – Socialist Republic of Vietnam; Capital: Hanoi	Widely recognized UN member state. Vietnam claimed sovereignty over the Paracel Islands (disputed by China and Taiwan) and Spratly Islands (disputed by China, Taiwan, Brunei, the Philippines, and Malaysia).
=== Y ===
Yemen – Republic of Yemen; Capital: Sana'a	Widely recognized UN member state.
=== Z ===
Zambia – Republic of Zambia; Capital: Lusaka	Widely recognized UN member state.
Zimbabwe – Republic of Zimbabwe; Capital: Harare	Widely recognized UN member state.

== Non-UN members or observers ==
Name and capital city	Information on status and recognition of sovereignty
Abkhazia – Republic of Abkhazia; Capital: Sukhumi	Partially-recognized de facto self-governing entity. (Note: Abkhazia is recognized by six UN member states (Russia, Syria (from 29 May 2018), Nicaragua, Venezuela, Nauru, and Vanuatu (from 23 May 2011)), and three non-UN member states (South Ossetia, Artsakh (Nagorno-Karabakh) and Transnistria).) Claimed by Georgia as the Government of the Autonomous Republic of Abkhazia.
Artsakh / Nagorno-Karabakh; Capital: Stepanakert: Nagorno-Karabakh Republic (to 21 February 2017); Republic of Artsakh (from 21 February 2017)	De facto self-governing entity. Not recognized by any other state. Claimed by Azerbaijan.
Azawad – State of Azawad (from 6 April 2012 to 12 July 2012); Capital: Gao	De facto self-governing state. Not recognized by any other state. Claimed by Mali. Debellation by Ansar Dine and MUJAO completed on 12 July 2012.
Cook Islands; Capital: Avarua	A state in free association with New Zealand, recognized by Japan (from 16 June 2011), Netherlands (from 16 August 2011) and China. The Cook Islands was a member of multiple UN agencies with full treaty making capacity. It shared a head of state and citizenship with New Zealand.
Crimea – Republic of Crimea (from 17 March 2014 to 21 March 2014); Capital: Simferopol	De facto self-governing state. Partially recognized de facto self-governing entity. (Note: Crimea was recognized only by Russia.) Claimed by Ukraine as the Autonomous Republic of Crimea.
→ → Donetsk People's Republic (from 7 April 2014 to 22 May 2014, from 20 May 2015); Capital: Donetsk	Partially-recognized de facto self-governing entity. (Note: Donetsk People's Republic is recognized by two non-UN member states (Luhansk People's Republic (from 11 May 2014) and South Ossetia (from 27 June 2014)).) Claimed by Ukraine as part of the Donetsk Oblast.
Kosovo – Republic of Kosovo; Capital: Pristina	Partially-recognized de facto self-governing entity. (Note: Kosovo is recognized by Afghanistan, Albania, Andorra (from 8 June 2011), Antigua and Barbuda (20 May 2015), Australia, Austria, Bahrain, Bangladesh (27 February 2017), Belgium, Belize, Benin (from 18 August 2011), Brunei (25 April 2012), Bulgaria, Burkina Faso, Burundi (16 October 2012), Canada, Central African Republic (from 22 July 2011), Chad (1 June 2012), Colombia, Comoros, Cook Islands (18 May 2015), Costa Rica, Croatia, the Czech Republic, Denmark, Djibouti (from 8 May 2010), Dominica (11 December 2012), Dominican Republic, Egypt (26 June 2013), El Salvador (29 June 2013), Estonia, Fiji (19 November 2012), Finland, France, Gabon (15 September 2011), the Gambia, Germany, Ghana (23 January 2012), Grenada (25 September 2013), Guinea-Bissau (from 10 January 2011), Guyana (16 March 2013), Haiti (10 February 2012), Honduras (from 3 September 2010), Hungary, Iceland, Ireland, Italy, Ivory Coast (16 September 2011), Japan, Jordan, Kiribati (from 21 October 2010), Kuwait (from 11 October 2011), Latvia, Lesotho (11 February 2014), Liberia, Libya (25 September 2013), Liechtenstein, Lithuania, Luxembourg, Macedonia, Malawi, Malaysia, Maldives, Malta, Marshall Islands, Mauritania (from 12 January 2010), Federated States of Micronesia, Monaco, Montenegro, Nauru, Netherlands, New Zealand, Niger (15 August 2011), Niue (23 June 2015), Norway, Oman (4 February 2011), Palau, Pakistan (24 December 2012), Panama, Papua New Guinea (3 October 2012), Peru, Poland, Portugal, Qatar (from 7 January 2011), the Republic of China, Saint Kitts and Nevis (28 November 2012), Saint Lucia (19 August 2011), Samoa, San Marino, Saudi Arabia, Senegal, Sierra Leone, Singapore (1 December 2016), Slovenia, the Solomon Islands (13 August 2014), Somalia (from 19 May 2010), South Korea, Suriname (8 July 2016), Swaziland (12 April 2010), Sweden, Switzerland, Tanzania (29 May 2013), Thailand (24 September 2013), Timor-Leste (20 September 2012), Togo (11 July 2014), Tonga (15 January 2014), Turkey, Tuvalu (18 November 2010), the United Arab Emirates, the United Kingdom, the United States, Vanuatu (from 28 April 2010), and Yemen (11 June 2013).) Claimed by Serbia as the Autonomous Province of Kosovo and Metohija under UN administration.
→ → → Luhansk People's Republic (from 27 April 2014 to 22 May 2014, from 20 May 2015); Capital: Luhansk	Partially-recognized de facto self-governing entity. (Note: Luhansk People's Republic is recognized by two non-UN member states (Donetsk People's Republic (from 11 May 2014) and South Ossetia (from 18 June 2014)).) Claimed by Ukraine as part of the Luhansk Oblast.
Nagorno-Karabakh → Artsakh
Niue; Capital: Alofi	A state in free association with New Zealand, recognized by China. Niue was a member of multiple UN agencies with full treaty making capacity. It shared a head of state and citizenship with New Zealand.
Northern Cyprus – Turkish Republic of Northern Cyprus; Capital: Lefkoşa	Partially-recognized de facto self-governing entity. (Note: Northern Cyprus is recognized only by Turkey.) Claimed by the Republic of Cyprus.
Sahrawi Arab Democratic Republic; Capital: Tifariti (temporary), El Aaiún (claimed)	Partially-recognized de facto self-governing entity. (Note: the Sahrawi Arab Democratic Republic was recognized by Algeria, Angola, Antigua and Barbuda, Barbados, Belize, Bolivia, Botswana, Burundi, Cambodia, Chad, Colombia, Costa Rica, Cuba, Dominica, the Dominican Republic, Ecuador, Ethiopia, Ghana, Grenada, Guatemala, Guinea-Bissau, Guyana, Haiti, Honduras, Iran, Jamaica, Laos, Lesotho, Libya, Madagascar, Mali, Malawi, Mauritania, Mauritius, Mexico, Mozambique, Namibia, Nicaragua, Nigeria, North Korea, Panama, Papua New Guinea, Paraguay, Rwanda, Saint Kitts and Nevis, Saint Lucia, Saint Vincent and the Grenadines, Sierra Leone, South Africa, Suriname, Syria, Tanzania, Timor-Leste, Trinidad and Tobago, Uganda, Uruguay, Vanuatu, Venezuela, Vietnam, Zambia, Zimbabwe.) The Sahrawi Arab Democratic Republic claimed the disputed territory of Western Sahara, most of which was under control of Morocco. The territories under its control, the so-called Free Zone, were claimed by Morocco. Its government resided in exile in Tindouf, Algeria.
Somaliland – Republic of Somaliland; Capital: Hargeisa	De facto self-governing entity. Not recognized by any other state. Claimed by Somalia.
South Ossetia; Capital: Tskhinvali: Republic of South Ossetia (to 9 April 2017); Republic of South Ossetia / State of Alania (from 9 April 2017)	Partially-recognized de facto independent state. (Note: South Ossetia is recognized by five UN member states (Russia, Syria (from 29 May 2018), Nicaragua, Venezuela, and Nauru), and four non-UN member states (Abkhazia, Artsakh (Nagorno-Karabakh), Transnistria, and the Sahrawi Arab Democratic Republic (from 30 September 2010)).) Claimed by Georgia as the Provisional Administrative Entity of South Ossetia.
Taiwan – Republic of China; Capital: Taipei (seat of government), Nanjing (claimed)	Partially-recognized de facto independent state but de jure widely recognized UN member state. (Note: The Republic of China and the People's Republic of China did not recognize each other, as both states claimed to be the sole legitimate government of China. The following states had recognized the ROC instead of the PRC as of October 2019: Belize, Guatemala, Haiti, Honduras, Marshall Islands, Nauru, Nicaragua, Palau, Paraguay, Saint Kitts and Nevis, Saint Lucia, Saint Vincent and the Grenadines, Swaziland, Tuvalu, and Vatican City.) The Republic of China claimed to be the sole legitimate government of China, but only administered Taiwan, Kinmen, the Matsu Islands, Pratas Island and Itu Aba. The Republic of China had territorial claims over Mongolia; the Russian republic of Tuva; the Sixty-Four Villages East of the River (administered by Russia); The majority of Gorno-Badakhshan (administered by Tajikistan); The eastern tip of the Wakhan Corridor (administered by Afghanistan); a small portion of Gilgit-Baltistan (administered by Pakistan and part of the disputed Kashmir region); Aksai Chin (administered by the People's Republic of China and part of the disputed Kashmir region); eastern Bhutan; South Tibet (controlled by India); and Kachin State (administered by Myanmar). De facto claimed by China.
Transnistria – Pridnestrovian Moldavian Republic; Capital: Tiraspol	Partially-recognized de facto self-governing entity. (Note: Transnistria is recognized by Abkhazia and South Ossetia.) Claimed by Moldova.

== Other entities ==
Excluded from the list above are the following noteworthy entities which either were not fully sovereign or did not claim to be independent:

- Antarctica as a whole had no government and no permanent population. Seven states claimed portions of Antarctica and five of these reciprocally recognised one another's claims. These claims, which were regulated by the Antarctic Treaty System, were neither recognised nor disputed by any other signatory state.
- The Catalan Republic was a proposed unrecognized secessionist state that was declared in Catalonia on 27 October 2017. The Parliament of Catalonia unilaterally declared independence from Spain amid a constitutional crisis over the 2017 Catalan independence referendum. Shortly thereafter, the Spanish Senate triggered Article 155 of the Spanish Constitution. Under Spanish law this granted the prime minister, Mariano Rajoy, authority to dismiss the Executive Council of Catalonia, dissolve the Parliament of Catalonia and call a snap regional election for 21 December 2017. By 30 October, work had resumed as normal throughout Catalonia as the Spanish government's takeover met with little resistance from Catalan authorities.
- The European Union is a sui generis supranational organisation which had 27 (then 28) member states. The member states transferred a measure of their legislative, executive, and judicial powers to the institutions of the EU, and as such the EU had some elements of sovereignty, without generally being considered a sovereign state. The European Union did not claim to be a sovereign state and had only limited capacity for relations with other states.
- The Islamic State (IS) is a proto-state and insurgency found in many nations throughout Asia and Africa. The Islamic State is a quasi-state that claimed a global caliphate and changed its name from the Islamic State of Iraq and the Levant to simply the Islamic State on 29 June 2014.
- The Sovereign Military Order of Malta was a United Nations observer. The order had bi-lateral diplomatic relations with a large number of states, but had no territory other than extraterritorial areas within Rome and Malta. The order's Constitution stated: "The Order is a subject of international law and exercises sovereign functions." Although the order frequently asserted its sovereignty, it did not claim to be a sovereign state. It lacked a defined territory. Since all its members were citizens of other states, almost all of them lived in their native countries, and those who resided in the order's extraterritorial properties in Rome did so only in connection with their official duties, the order lacked the characteristic of having a permanent population.

== See also ==
- List of sovereign states by year
- List of state leaders in 2010
- List of state leaders in 2011
- List of state leaders in 2012
- List of state leaders in 2013
- List of state leaders in 2014
- List of state leaders in 2015
- List of state leaders in 2016
- List of state leaders in 2017
- List of state leaders in 2018
- List of state leaders in 2019
