= List of African dependencies =

List of African dependencies and other territories — including their respective capitals:

== External territories ==
=== France ===
- French Southern Territories (Note: Overseas territory of France) — Saint Pierre, Réunion
  - Crozet Islands — Alfred Faure
  - Kerguelen Islands — Port-aux-Français
  - Saint Paul and Amsterdam Islands — Martin-de-Viviès
  - Scattered Islands — Saint Pierre, Réunion
    - Bassas da India — N/A
    - Europa Island — N/A
    - Glorioso Islands — N/A
      - Banc du Geyser — N/A
    - Juan de Nova Island — N/A
    - Tromelin Island — N/A

=== United Kingdom ===
- British Indian Ocean Territory (Note: British overseas territory) — Camp Justice
- Saint Helena, Ascension and Tristan da Cunha — Jamestown
  - Ascension Island — Georgetown
  - Saint Helena — Jamestown
  - Tristan da Cunha — Edinburgh of the Seven Seas
    - Gough Island — N/A

== Internal territories ==
=== France ===
- Mayotte (Note: Overseas department and region of France) — Mamoudzou
- Réunion — Saint Denis

=== Italy ===
- Sicily (Note: Region of Italy)^{[A]} — Palermo
  - Pantelleria
  - Pelagian Islands
    - Lampedusa
    - Lampione
    - Linosa

A. A continental island on the African Plate, Sicily is geologically a part of Africa, but geopolitically a part of Europe.

=== Tanzania ===
- Zanzibar (Note: Semi-autonomous region of Tanzania) — Zanzibar City

== Condominium ==
- Abyei Area (Note: Condominium between South Sudan and the Sudan) — Abyei Town

== Terra nullius ==
- Bir Tawil (Note: Terra nullius) — N/A

== Disputed territories ==
- Halaib Triangle
- Ilemi Triangle
- Kafia Kingi
- Western Sahara
  - Free Zone — Tifariti (de facto) / Laayoune (claimed)
  - Southern Provinces
    - Dakhla-Oued Ed-Dahab^{[A]} — Dakhla^{[B]}
    - Guelmim-Oued Noun^{[C]} — Guelmim^{[D]}
    - Laâyoune-Sakia El Hamra^{[E]} — Laayoune^{[B]}

A. Lies completely within the disputed territory of Western Sahara.

B. Located in the disputed territory of Western Sahara.

C. Lies partly within the disputed territory of Western Sahara.

D. Located outside the disputed territory of Western Sahara.

E. Lies mostly within the disputed territory of Western Sahara.

== See also ==
- Autonomous communities of Spain
- Autonomous Regions of Portugal
- British Overseas Territories
- Dependent territories in Africa
- Overseas department and region
- Overseas territory (France)
- Political status of Western Sahara
- Provinces of Spain
- Regions of Italy
