= French Africa =

All the historic holdings of France on the African continent

French Africa includes all the historic holdings of France on the African continent.

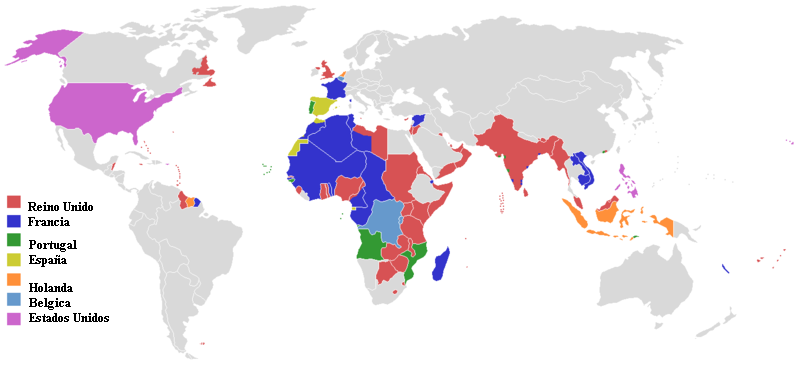
Map showing French colonies, protectorates and mandates (in blue) in Africa in 1945; namely French Equatorial Africa, French North Africa, French Somaliland, French Libya and French West Africa. Along with former Belgian colonies (shown in light blue), these areas today make up the bulk of francophone Africa.

== French possessions in Africa ==
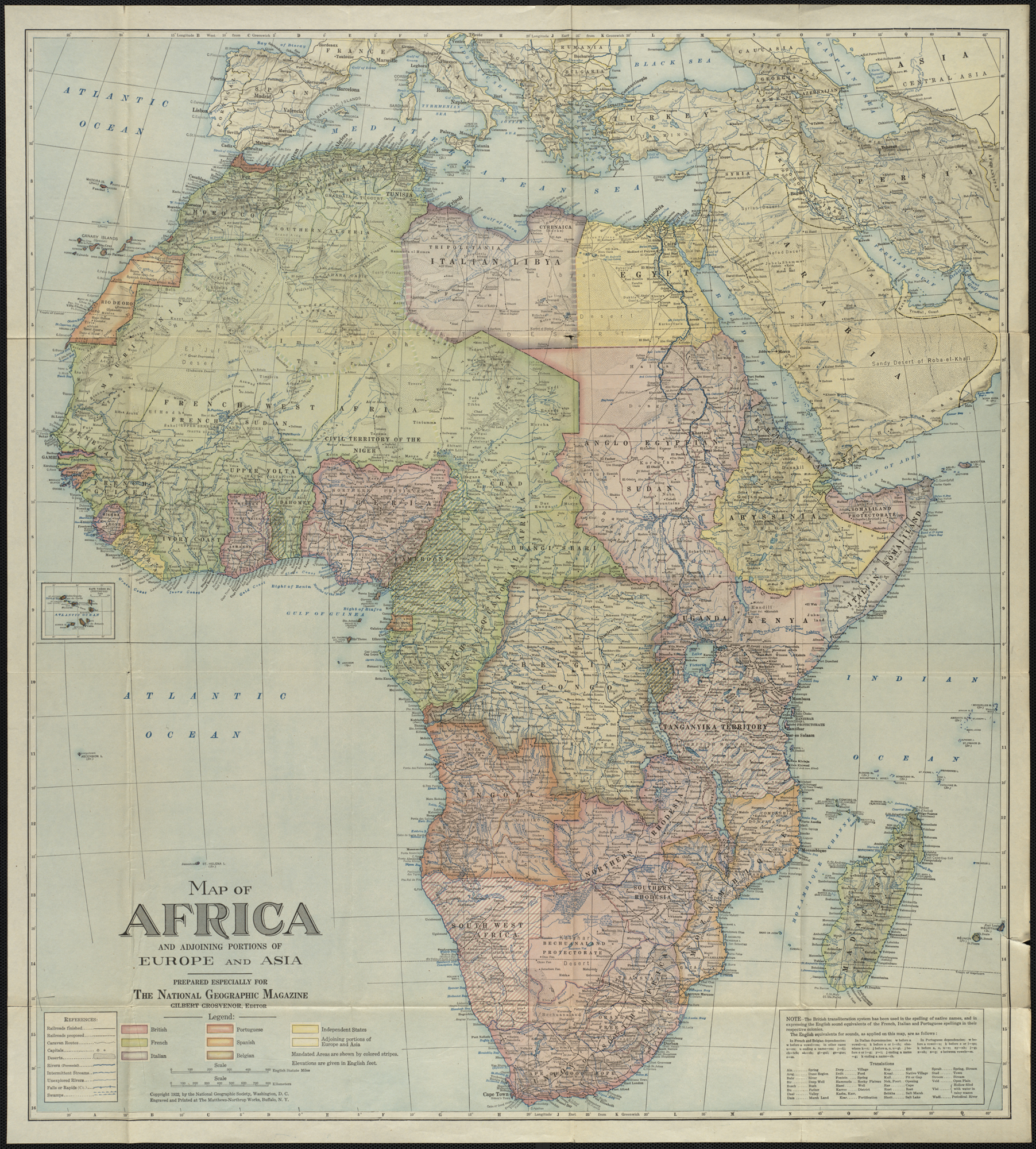
Map of French colonies in Africa (in green), c. 1922

=== French North Africa ===
- Egypt (1798–1801)
- French Algeria (1830–1962)
- Protectorate of Tunisia (1881–1956)
- Protectorate in Morocco (1912–1956)
- Military Territory of Fezzan-Ghadames (1943–1951)

=== French West Africa ===
- Ivory Coast (1843–1960)
- Dahomey or French Dahomey (now Benin) (1883–1960)
  - Independent of Dahomey, under French protectorate in 1889
  - Porto-Novo (protectorate) (1863–1865, 1882)
  - Cotonou (protectorate) (1868)
- French Sudan (now Mali) (1883–1960)
  - Senegambia and Niger (1902–1904)
- Guinea or French Guinea (1891–1958)
- Mauritania (1902–1960)
  - Adrar emirate (protectorate) (1909)
  - The Taganit confederation's emirate (protectorate) (1905)
  - Emirate of Brakna (protectorate)
  - Emirate of Trarza (protectorate) (1902)
- Niger (1890–1960)
  - Sultanate of Damagaram (Zinder) (protectorate) (1899)
- Senegal (1677–1960)
- French Upper Volta (now Burkina Faso) (1896–1960)
- French Togoland (1918–1960) (formerly a German colony, mandate became a French colony) (now Togo)
- Nigeria
  - The Enclaves of Forcados and Badjibo (territory under a lease of 30 years) (1900–1927)
  - The Emirate of Muri (Northeast of Nigeria) (1892–1893)
- Gambia
  - Albreda (1681–1857)
  - Kunta Kinteh Island (1695–1697, 1702)

=== French Equatorial Africa ===
- Chad (1900–1960)
- Oubangui-Chari (currently Central African Republic) (1905–1960)
  - Dar al Kuti (protectorate) (1897) (in 1912 its sultanate was suppressed by the French)
  - Sultanate of Bangassou (protectorate) (1894)
- Present-day The Republic of Congo, then French Congo (1875–1960)
- Gabon (1839–1960)
- French Cameroon (91% of current Cameroon) (1918–1960) (formerly a German colony, Mandate, Protectorate then French Colony)
- São Tomé and Príncipe (1709)

=== East Africa and Indian Ocean ===
- Madagascar (1896–1960)
  - Kingdom of Imerina (protectorate) (1896)
- Isle de France (1715–1810) (now Mauritius)
- Djibouti (French Somaliland) (the French Territory of the Afars and the Issas) (French Somalia) (1862–1977)
- French Egypt (1798–1801, 1858–1882, 1956)
- Mayotte (1841–present)
- Seychelles (1756–1810)
- Chagos Archipelago (1721–1745, 1768–1814)
- The Scattered Islands (Banc du Geyser, Bassas da India, Europa Island, Juan de Nova Island, Glorioso Islands, Tromelin Island)
- Comoros (1866–1975)
- Réunion (1710–present)

== See also ==
- French colonial empire
- History of Africa
- Overseas France
- Scramble for Africa
- Troupes coloniales – French colonial forces
