= Flag of the French Southern and Antarctic Lands =

French regional flag

- Flag of the French Southern and Antarctic Lands
- Proportion: 2:3
- Adopted: 23 February 2007
- Design: A blue ensign with the French tricolor in the canton and the letters T.A.A.F in the form of a white anchor in the fly surrounded by five, five-pointed white stars.

The flag of the French Southern and Antarctic Lands (French: Drapeau des Terres Australes et Antarctiques Françaises) is a flag representing the overseas territory of France consisting of Adélie Land (Terre Adélie), the Crozet Islands (Îles Crozet), the Kerguelen Islands (Îles Kerguelen), Saint Paul and Amsterdam Islands (Îles Saint Paul et Amsterdam), and the Scattered Islands (Îles Éparses). The flag was adopted on 23 February 2007.

== Description ==
The flag is features the French tricolor in the canton, often displayed with a white border. In the lower fly, the letters T.A.A.F (from the French name Terres Australes et Antarctiques Françaises) forms a monogram in white, which is stylized to resemble an anchor. The monogram is surrounded by five white stars. The stars are sometimes thought to represent each of the five regions of the territory, though this was not stated in the decree to adopt the flag.

== History ==
Flag of the Senior Administrator of the French Southern and Antarctic Lands

The French Southern and Antarctic Lands – including Adélie Land, the Crozet Islands, the Kerguelen Islands, Saint Paul and Amsterdam Islands and the Scattered Islands – became an overseas territory of France in 1955. Previously, the islands which make up the territory had been attached to the Colony of Madagascar and Dependencies, at the time a French colony).

The first senior administrator of the territory, Xavier Richert, introduced a flag for his office. The flag, which was created in 1958, was nearly identical to the current one with the exception of having three stars instead of five. The three stars may have been in reference to his rank of Vice admiral, which is represented by three stars in the French Navy.

In 2007, the official flag of the French Southern and Antarctic Lands was adopted.

== See also ==
- List of French flags
- List of Antarctic flags
- Flag of Antarctica
