= Bassas da India =

French atoll in the Mozambique Channel

- Flag of the French Southern and Antarctic Lands Coat of arms
- Motto: "Liberté, égalité, fraternité" (French) (English: "Liberty, equality, fraternity")
- Anthem: La Marseillaise ("The Marseillaise")
- Status: District of French Southern and Antarctic Lands

Bassas da India
Disputed island
- Map of the Scattered Islands in the Indian Ocean

Geography
- Location: Mozambique Channel
- Coordinates: 21°29′S 39°41′E

Administration
- France
- Overseas territory: French Southern and Antarctic Lands
- District: Scattered Islands in the Indian Ocean

Claimed by
- Madagascar

Bassas da India (French pronunciation: [basa da ɛ̃dja]; Malagasy: Nosy Bedimaky) is an uninhabited, roughly circular atoll located in the southern Mozambique Channel, about halfway between Mozambique and Madagascar (about 385 km [239 mi] farther east) and around 110 km (68 mi) northwest of Europa Island. It is administered by France as part of the French Southern and Antarctic Lands, though it is claimed by Madagascar. The rim of the atoll averages around 100 m (330 ft) in width and encloses a shallow lagoon of depth no greater than 15 m (49 ft). Overall, the atoll is about 10 km (6.2 mi) in diameter, rising steeply from the seabed 3,000 m (9,800 ft) below to encircle an area (including lagoon) of 80 km^{2} (31 sq mi). Its exclusive economic zone, 123,700 km^{2} (47,800 sq mi) in size, is contiguous with that of Europa Island.

The atoll consists of ten barren rocky islets, with no vegetation, totalling 20 hectares (49 acres) in area. Those on the north and east sides are 2.1 to 3.0 metres (7 to 10 ft) high, while those on the west and south sides are 1.2 metres (4 ft) high. The reef, whose coastline measures 35.2 km (21.9 mi), is entirely covered by the sea from three hours before high tide to three hours afterward. The region is also subject to cyclones, making the atoll a long-time maritime hazard and the site of numerous shipwrecks.

Jaguar Seamount and Hall Tablemount lie about 40 and 70 kilometres (25 and 43 mi) further southwest.

== History ==
The Bassas da India was first recorded by Portuguese explorers in the early sixteenth century as the "Baixo da Judia" ("Jewess Shoals"). The Judia ("Jewess", for the ancestry of its owner Fernão de Loronha) was the Portuguese ship that discovered the feature by running aground on it in 1506. The name became "Bassas da India" due to transcription errors by cartographers. The Santiago broke up on the shoal in 1585.

It was rediscovered by the Europa in 1774, whence the name "Europa Rocks". The Malay was lost 27 July 1842 on the Europa Rocks.

In 1897, the shoal became a French possession, later being placed under the administration of a commissioner residing in Réunion in 1968. Madagascar became independent in 1960 and has claimed sovereignty over the shoal since 1972. The Scattered Islands in the Indian Ocean are partially claimed by the Comoros, Madagascar, and Mauritius. The Malagasy and Mauritian claims, however, are significantly later than their access to independence. However, the agreement reached in October 2024 on the restitution to Mauritius of the Chagos Islands by Great Britain, in the heart of the Indian Ocean, notably home to the American base of Diego Garcia, has relaunched the debate in Madagascar.

== Wildlife ==
The presence of Galapagos sharks was reported in 2003, which is a first in the Mozambique Channel.

== Tourism ==
Mooring at Bassas da India requires a permit from the French Government. Fishing without such a permit may result in the boat being expelled or even confiscated. Several illegal tourism charters departing from Mozambique or South Africa have been seized since 2013 by the French navy.

== Gallery ==
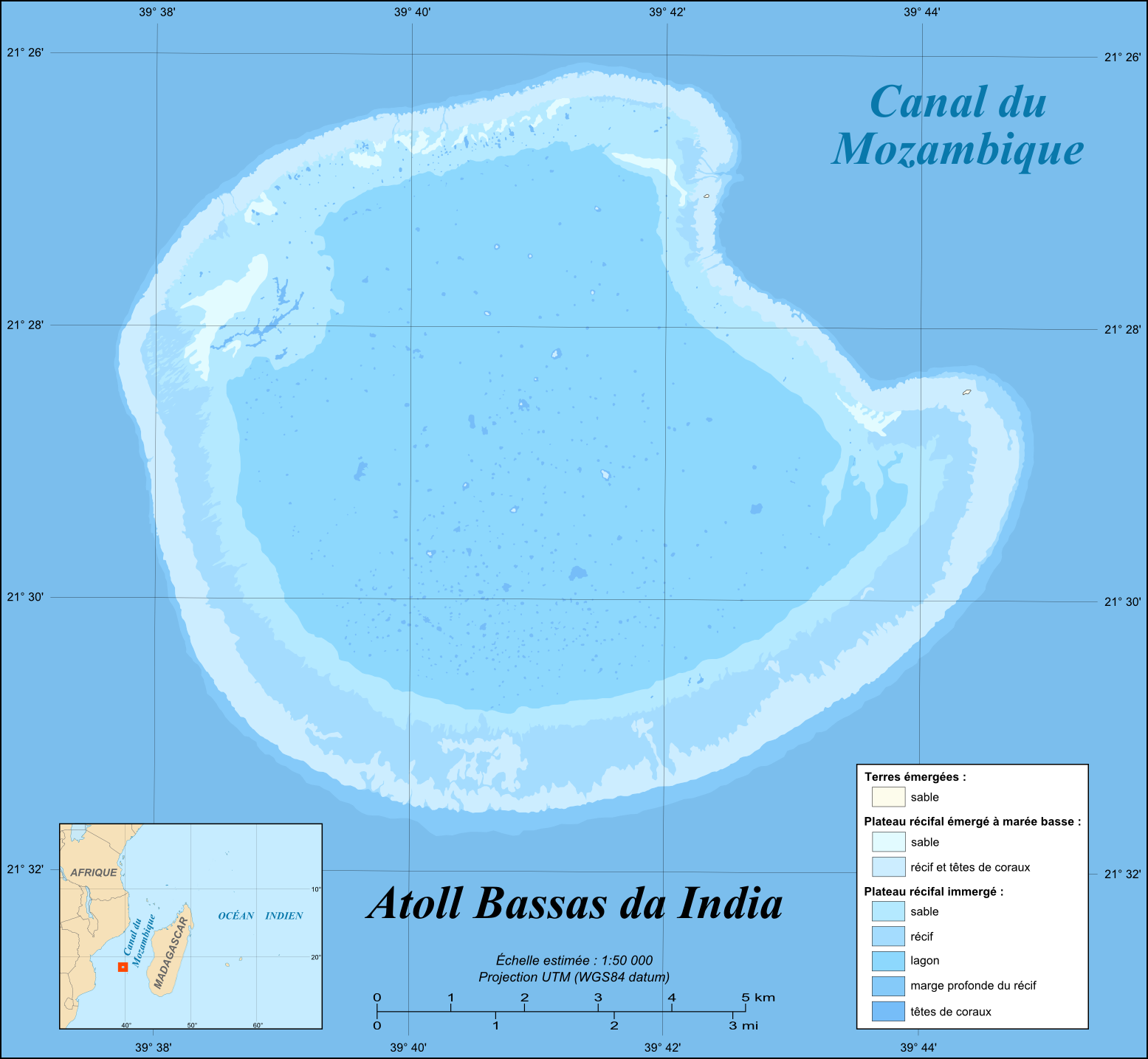
Detailed map

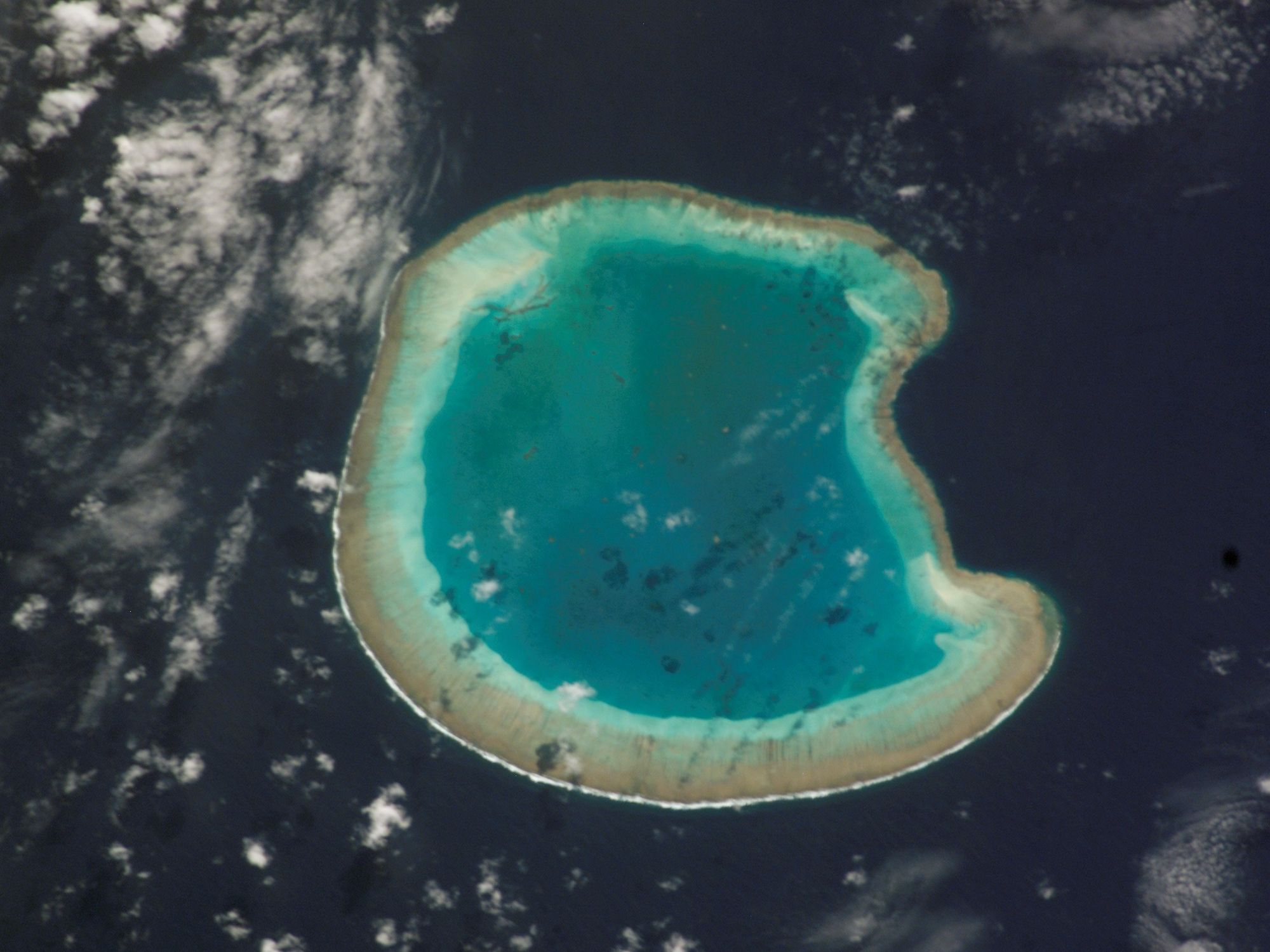
Photograph taken from the International Space Station (ISS)

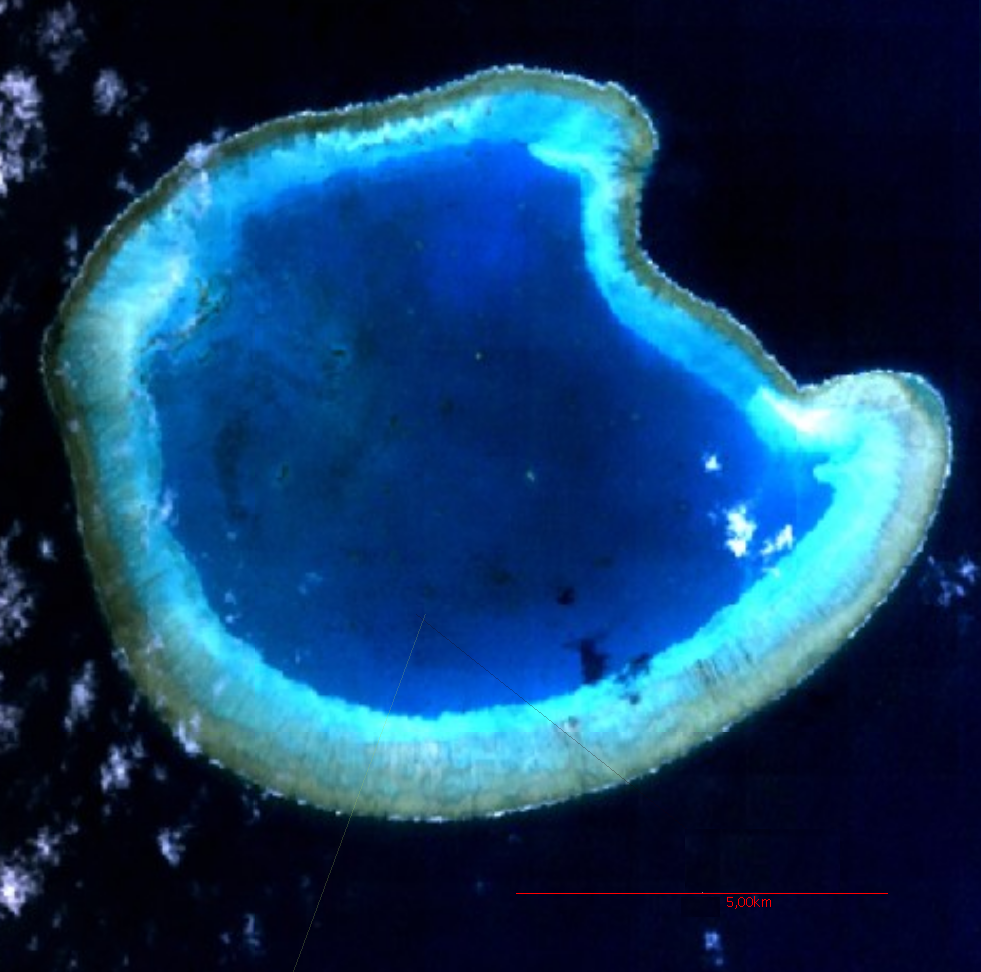
Landsat 7 image

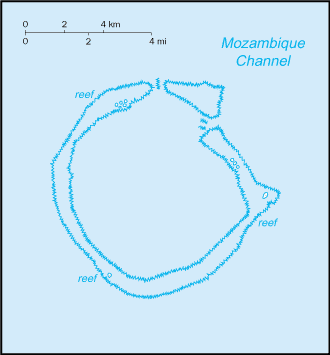
CIA World Factbook map

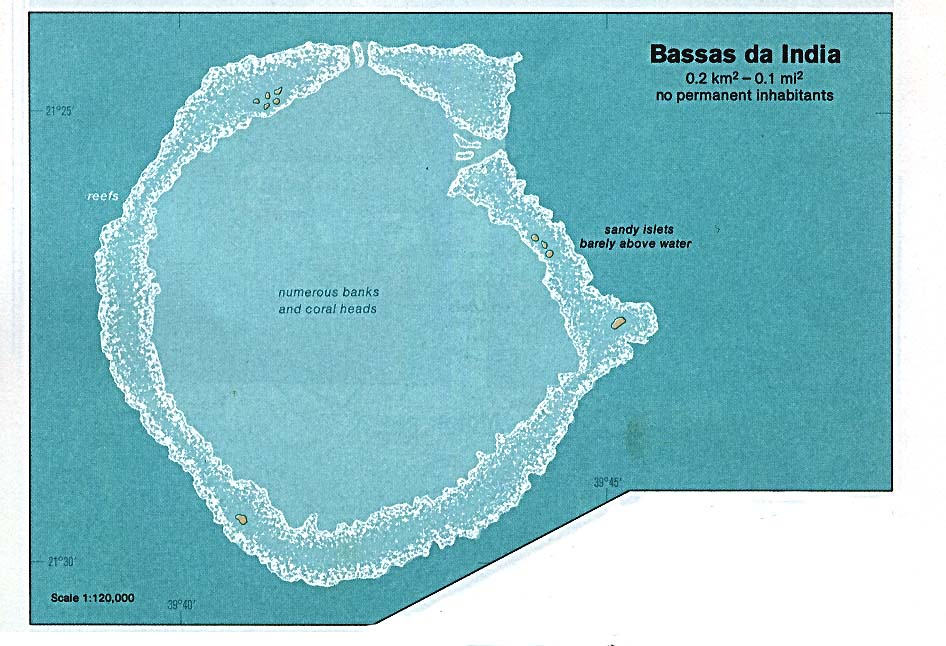
Central Intelligence Agency map

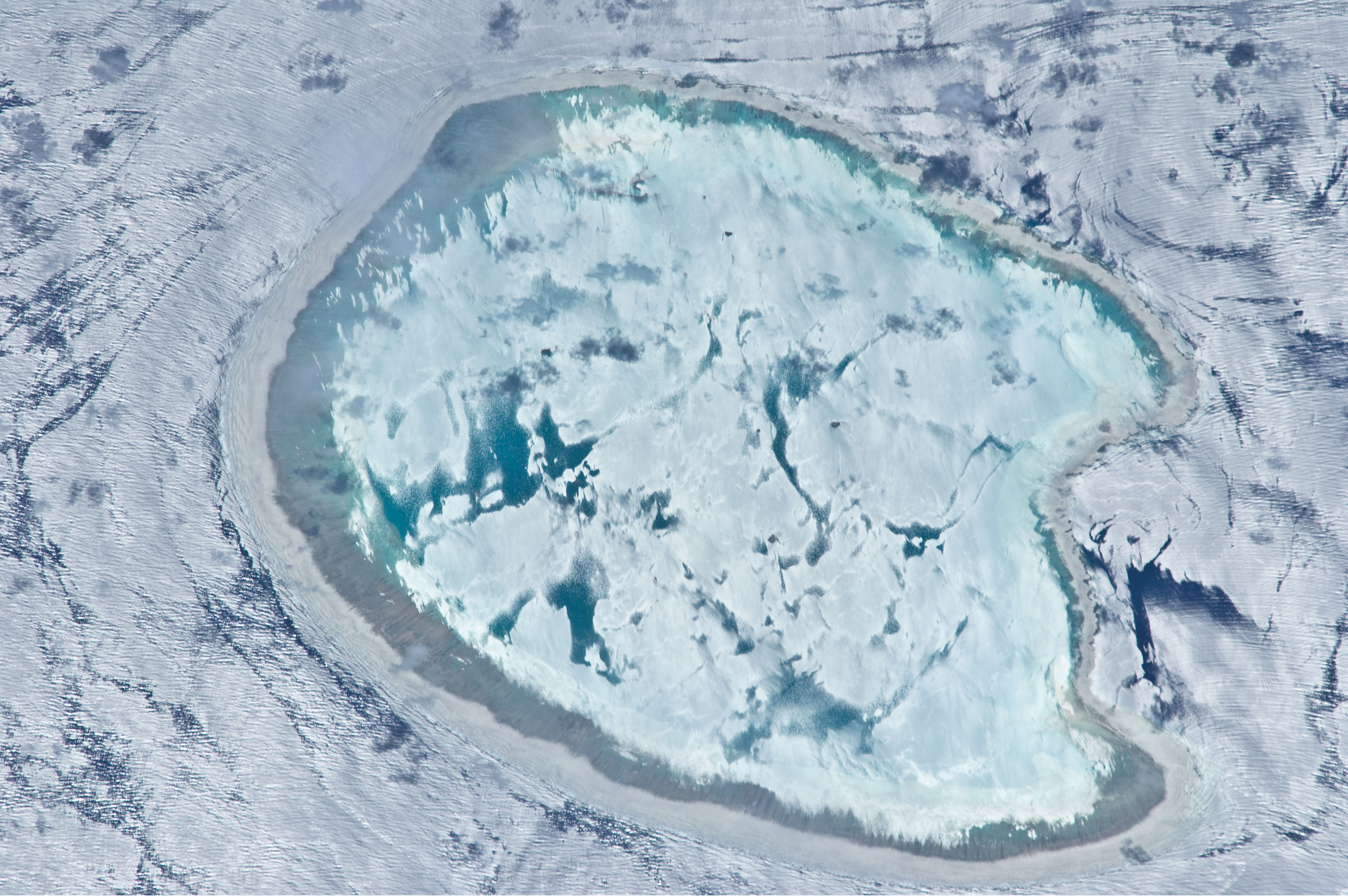
ISS image of Bassas da India with varying degrees of sunglint
