= Europa Island =

French atoll in the Mozambique Channel

Europa Island Île Europa (French)
- Flag of the French Southern and Antarctic Lands Coat of arms
- Motto: "Liberté, égalité, fraternité" (French) (English: "Liberty, equality, fraternity")
- Anthem: La Marseillaise ("The Marseillaise")
- Status: District of French Southern and Antarctic Lands

Europa Island
Disputed island
- Map of the Scattered Islands in the Indian Ocean (Europa Island in the southwest, marked by its French name Île Europa)

Geography
- Location: Mozambique Channel
- Coordinates: 22°22′S 40°22′E

Administration
- France
- Overseas territory: French Southern and Antarctic Lands
- District: Scattered Islands in the Indian Ocean

Claimed by
- Madagascar

Europa Island (French: Île Europa, pronounced [il øʁɔpa]), in Malagasy Nosy Ampela is a 28-square-kilometre (11 sq mi) low-lying tropical atoll in the Mozambique Channel, about a third of the way from southern Madagascar to southern Mozambique. The island had never been inhabited until 1820, when the French family of Rosier moved to it. The island officially became a possession of France in 1897, though it is claimed by Madagascar.

The island, garrisoned by a detachment from Réunion, has a weather station and is visited by scientists. Though uninhabited now, it is part of the Scattered Islands of the French Southern and Antarctic Lands administrative region.

Europa Island was the setting of "Search in the Deep", a 1968 episode of The Undersea World of Jacques Cousteau, partly focusing on the breeding habits of the green sea turtle.

== Description ==
Europa is 6 kilometres (3.7 mi) in diameter, with a maximum altitude of 6 metres (20 ft), and has 22.2 kilometres (13.8 mi) of coastline. It is surrounded by coral beaches and a fringing reef and encloses a mangrove lagoon of around 9 square kilometres (3.5 sq mi) and open to the sea on one side.

There are no ports or harbours but anchorage is possible offshore. Its exclusive economic zone, contiguous with that of Bassas da India, is 127,300 square kilometres (49,200 sq mi). The airstrip is 1,500 metres (4,920 ft) long.

=== Ecology ===
Designations

Ramsar Wetland
- Official name: Île d’Europa
- Designated: 27 October 2011
- Reference no.: 2073

The island is a nature reserve. Its vegetation consists of dry forest, scrub, Euphorbia, the mangrove swamp, and the remains of a sisal plantation. It is one of the world's largest nesting sites for green sea turtles. It is also home to goats introduced by settlers in the late 18th century.

The island has been identified as an Important Bird Area by BirdLife International because it supports a large and diverse population of breeding seabirds and other waterbirds. It is the only known breeding site outside Aldabra and Madagascar for Malagasy pond herons. Seabirds include the second largest colony in the western Indian Ocean of great frigatebirds (with up to 1100 pairs), tropical shearwaters (up to 100 pairs, probably of the subspecies Puffinus bailloni bailloni previously considered endemic to the Mascarene Islands), dimorphic egrets and Caspian terns.

Europa is home to an endemic subspecies of white-tailed tropicbird (Phaethon lepturus europae), three kinds of landbird (including an endemic subspecies of the Malagasy white-eye) and its own species of hissing cockroach, Elliptorhina lefeuvri.

=== Climate ===
Europa Island's climate is affected by the Agulhas Current with water temperatures usually above 30 °C (86 °F), southeast trade winds during the (austral) winter and occasional cyclones. The climate can be described as a semi-arid and tropical combination with wet summers and dry winters.

Climate data for Europa Island (1991–2020 normals, extremes 1961–1990, 2006–2023)
Month	Jan	Feb	Mar	Apr	May	Jun	Jul	Aug	Sep	Oct	Nov	Dec	Year
Record high °C (°F)	35.5 (95.9)	34.9 (94.8)	35.0 (95.0)	33.9 (93.0)	31.4 (88.5)	29.3 (84.7)	30.0 (86.0)	30.3 (86.5)	34.0 (93.2)	34.3 (93.7)	34.3 (93.7)	34.7 (94.5)	35.5 (95.9)
Mean daily maximum °C (°F)	30.8 (87.4)	31.2 (88.2)	30.6 (87.1)	29.2 (84.6)	27.6 (81.7)	26.1 (79.0)	25.6 (78.1)	26.2 (79.2)	27.1 (80.8)	28.4 (83.1)	29.3 (84.7)	30.2 (86.4)	28.5 (83.3)
Daily mean °C (°F)	27.5 (81.5)	27.6 (81.7)	27.0 (80.6)	25.6 (78.1)	23.5 (74.3)	22.0 (71.6)	21.6 (70.9)	22.0 (71.6)	22.7 (72.9)	24.2 (75.6)	25.3 (77.5)	26.6 (79.9)	24.7 (76.5)
Mean daily minimum °C (°F)	24.1 (75.4)	24.3 (75.7)	23.6 (74.5)	21.8 (71.2)	19.7 (67.5)	18.4 (65.1)	17.7 (63.9)	17.7 (63.9)	18.7 (65.7)	20.5 (68.9)	21.8 (71.2)	23.1 (73.6)	20.9 (69.6)
Record low °C (°F)	18.8 (65.8)	19.1 (66.4)	17.3 (63.1)	15.6 (60.1)	12.2 (54.0)	10.2 (50.4)	10.5 (50.9)	11.1 (52.0)	11.7 (53.1)	12.4 (54.3)	12.2 (54.0)	15.0 (59.0)	10.2 (50.4)
Average precipitation mm (inches)	124.1 (4.89)	101.8 (4.01)	49.4 (1.94)	32.1 (1.26)	22.2 (0.87)	12.6 (0.50)	8.0 (0.31)	6.7 (0.26)	9.1 (0.36)	6.6 (0.26)	34.4 (1.35)	47.9 (1.89)	454.9 (17.9)
Average precipitation days (≥ 0.1 mm)	9.5	6.2	4.3	3.8	3.2	2.3	1.6	1.2	0.7	1.0	2.5	4.3	65
Average relative humidity (%)	80	81	78	76	76	76	76	77	77	77	78	79	78
Mean monthly sunshine hours	275.9	257.1	275.9	255.0	272.8	246.0	263.5	288.3	276.0	300.7	291.0	272.8	3,275
Mean daily sunshine hours	8.9	9.1	8.9	8.5	8.8	8.2	8.5	9.3	9.2	9.7	9.7	8.8	9.0
Source 1: Deutscher Wetterdienst (humidity and sun 1961–1990)
Source 2: Starlings Roost Weather

== History ==
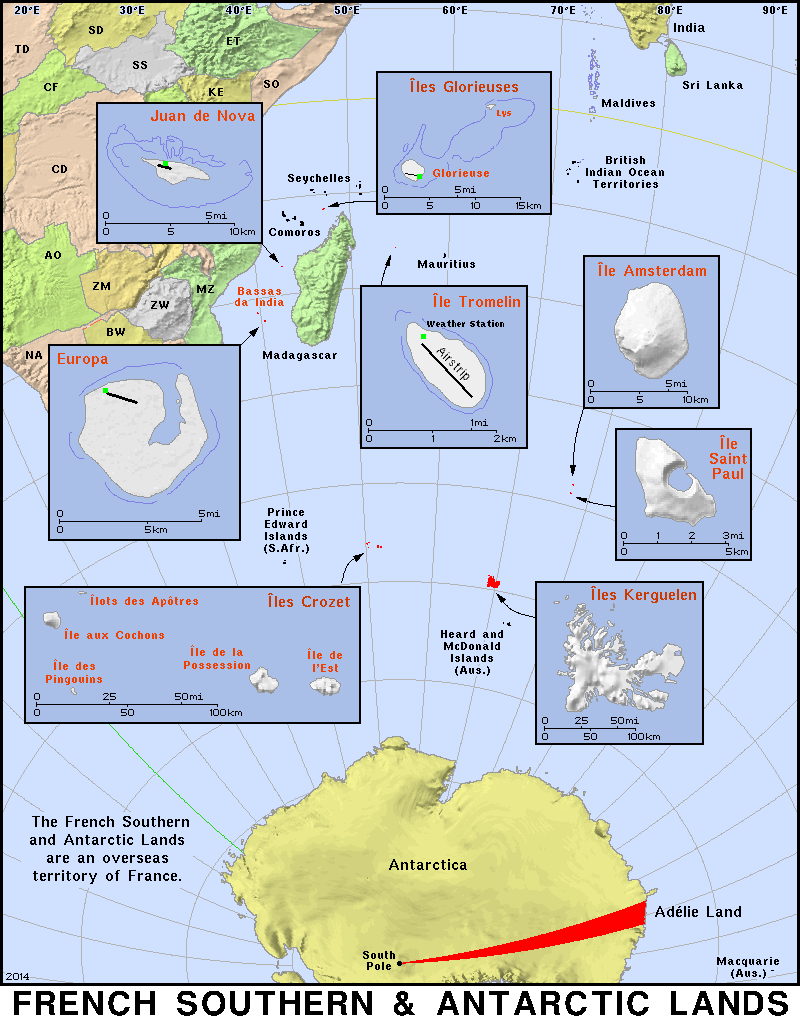
Position of Europa Islands relative to other islands of the French Southern and Antarctic Lands

While the island has probably been sighted by Portuguese navigators since at least the 16th century, the first British ship to describe the island was HMS Norfolk, in 1764, however it misidentified it as the Bassas da India. It takes its name from the British ship Europa, which visited it in December 1774. Its current name was given by William Fitzwilliam Owen who named it after the ship in 1825.

=== Colonization attempts ===
Ruins and graves on Europa island attest to several attempts at settlement from the 1860s to the 1920s. The French Rosiers family moved from Tulear to the island in 1860, but subsequently abandoned it.

In 1903, a small colony was created, nevertheless the venture ceased due to the lack of clean water, the colonist who tried to leave the island in a pirogue drowned, the others were collected and brought back to Tulear. In 1910, two married couples from Seychelles, and 3 Malagasy natives venture into the island, however the Malagasy were executed due to being suspected of raping the women, their remains are buried in a small cemetery in the island.

After the Second World War, interest in creating a permanent settlement on the island were revived by the development of air transport and the need for a denser global meteorological observation network, particularly to cover vast ocean areas. In the early 1950s, France undertook several projects to establish weather stations on its uninhabited islands, from the Kerguelen islands to the Scattered Islands in the Indian Ocean, thereby asserting a strategic presence in the Indian Ocean. On Europa Island, the first meteorological mission landed under the command of Serge Frolow, an émigré from the Russian Empire, on January 12, 1950, in extremely precarious conditions.

Later that year, a small aerodrome was constructed and inaugurated in November 18, a French copy of the Junkers Ju 52 (the Amiot AAC.1 Toucan), was the first aircraft to land in the island, nevertheless due to it being located in a flood zone, in the steppe plain of the south of the island. It was moved once, but insufficiently, before finding its current and definitive location in the northwest in April 1973, after clearing the Euphorbia of the forest.

=== Foreign claims ===
When the French Third Republic annexed Madagascar on August 6, 1896, Europa Island also became a French possession. However, the establishment of the French flag was not notified until October 31, 1897.

During the period of French Madagascar, the administrative attachment of Europa Island was modified several times. It sometimes referred to regions far removed from the island: Tananarive province in 1921, Maintirano province in 1930, Nosy Be district in 1932 and finally Tuléar district in 1949.

After the creation of the Malagasy Republic and shortly before Madagascar gained its full independence in June 1960, the French government unilaterally decreed on April 1, 1960, the detachment of the Scattered Islands in the Indian Ocean, placing directly "the islands of Tromelin, Glorioso, Juan de Nova, Europa, and Bassas da India under the authority of the Minister for Overseas Departments and Territories," who then entrusted their administration in September 1960 to the delegate of the Government of the Republic, namely the Prefect of Réunion. This was primarily intended, as De Gaulle stated, for France to preserve strategic positions and retain sites potentially usable for French nuclear tests.

Following the Rotaka in 1972, the new Malagasy government reaffirmed its territorial claim to the Scattered Islands in the Indian Ocean. France then decided to strengthen its military presence in the area and in 1973 established a small military detachment on Europa Island, as well as on the other French islands in the Mozambique Channel. This detachment remains in place today, even though the meteorological station is now automated.

From 2005, the role of government delegate for the Scattered Islands in the Indian Ocean was entrusted to the Prefect of the French Southern and Antarctic Lands. Then, in February 2007, the Scattered Islands in the Indian Ocean, including Europa, were fully incorporated into this Overseas collectivity to form its fifth district.

France exercises sovereign rights over the maritime areas adjacent to the island, in order to ensure the protection of rich biodiversity, cultural and natural assets as well as economic resources for which it is responsible.

In May 2019, the President of the French Republic, Emmanuel Macron, expressed his willingness to engage in "dialogue to reach a common solution" through the establishment of a joint commission with Madagascar, without resorting to an international court. On November 18, 2019, two delegations met in Antananarivo to begin preparatory discussions within the framework of a joint commission launched in May 2019 by the French and Malagasy presidents. The process was intended to reach an agreement by June 2020, the 60th anniversary of Madagascar's independence, but it failed.

The Scattered Islands in the Indian Ocean are partially claimed by the Comoros, Madagascar, and Mauritius. The Malagasy and Mauritian claims, however, are significantly later than their access to independence. The main issue being the exploitation of the exclusive economic zone (EEZ): 127,300 km^{2} (roughly 50,000 mi^{2}) of Europa Island.

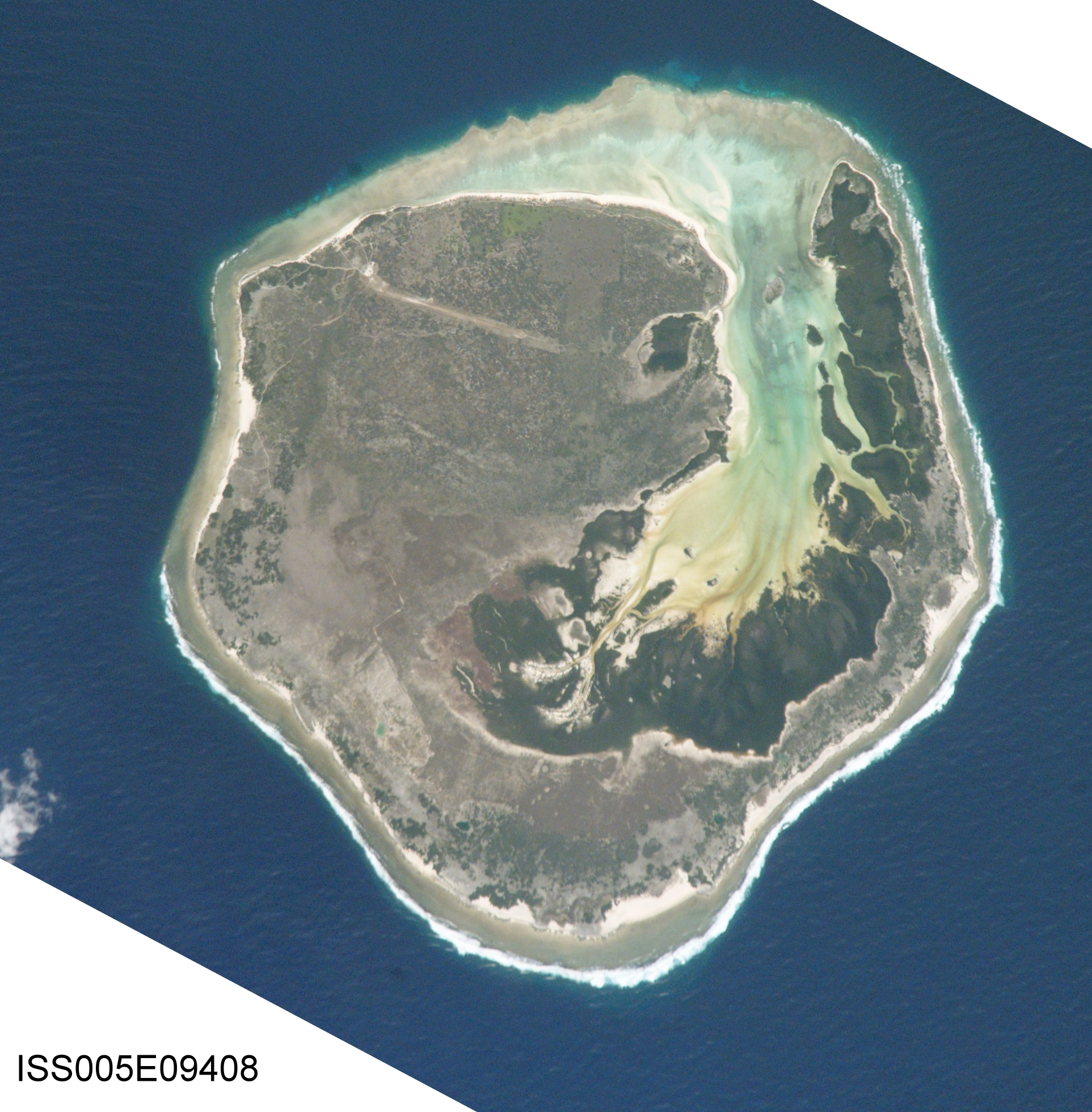
Satellite photo of Europa Island (north at top)

Map of Europa Island

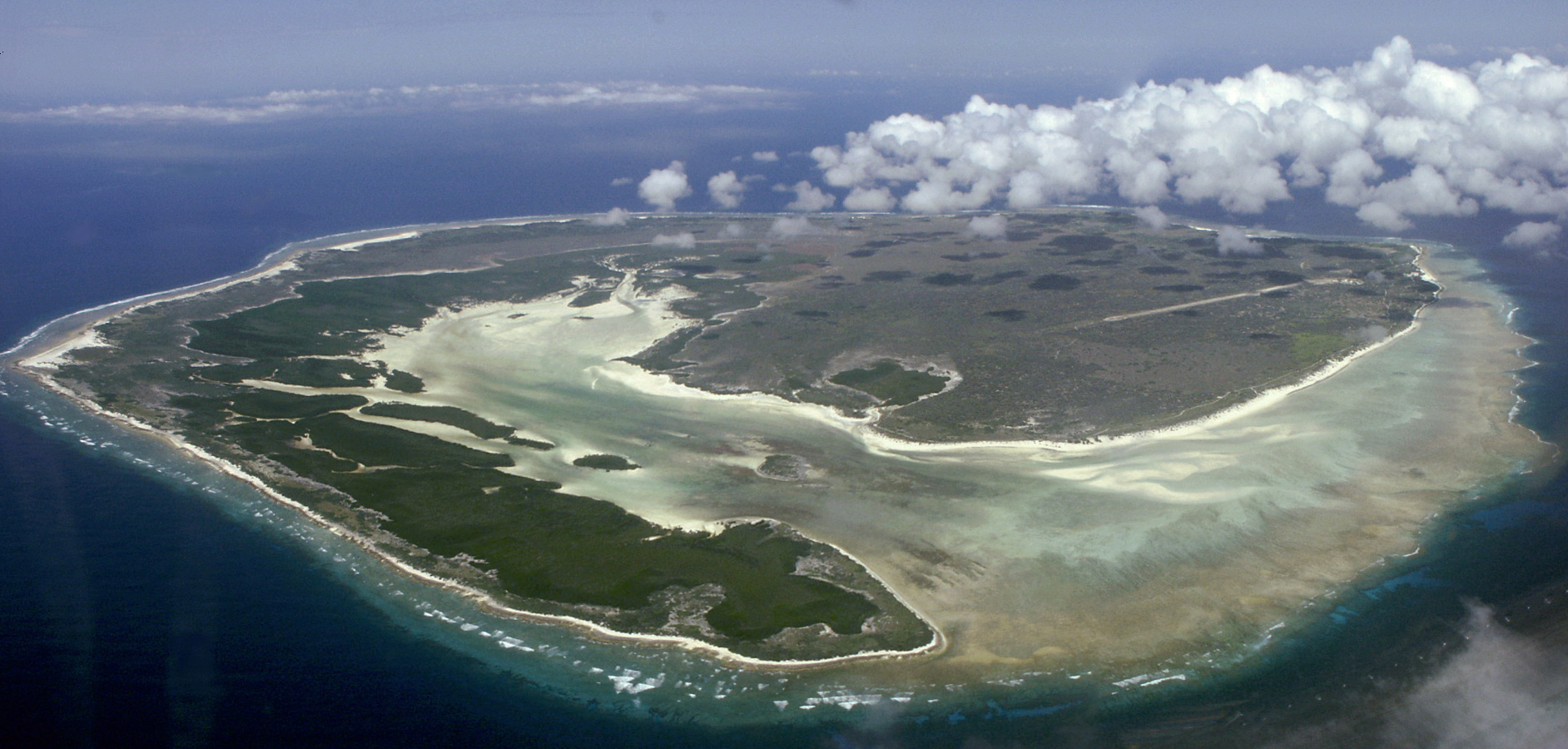
Aerial view of the island

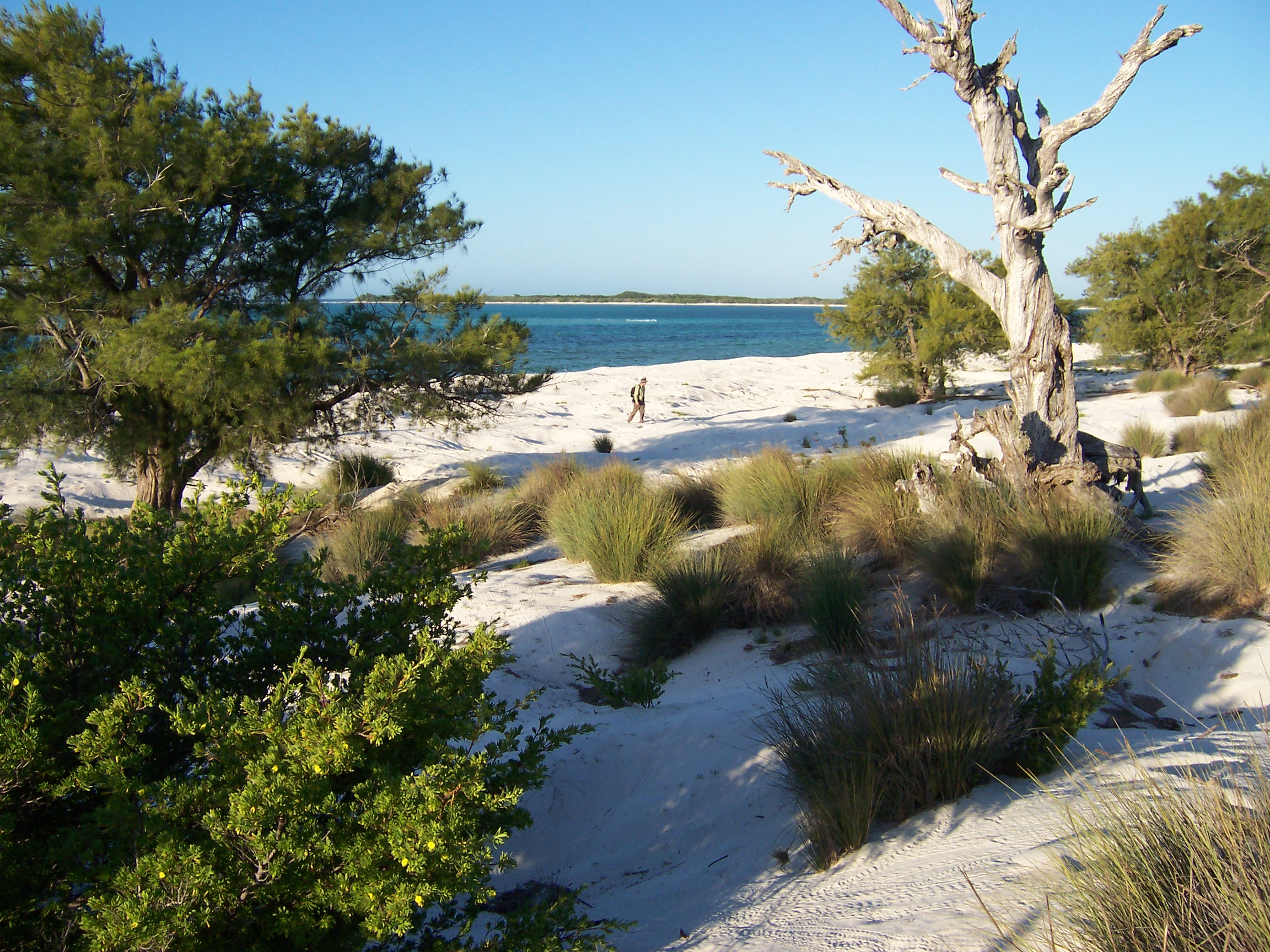
Beaches, north of the island
