= Banc du Geyser =

Disputed territory and reef in the Mozambique Channel

Disputed reef
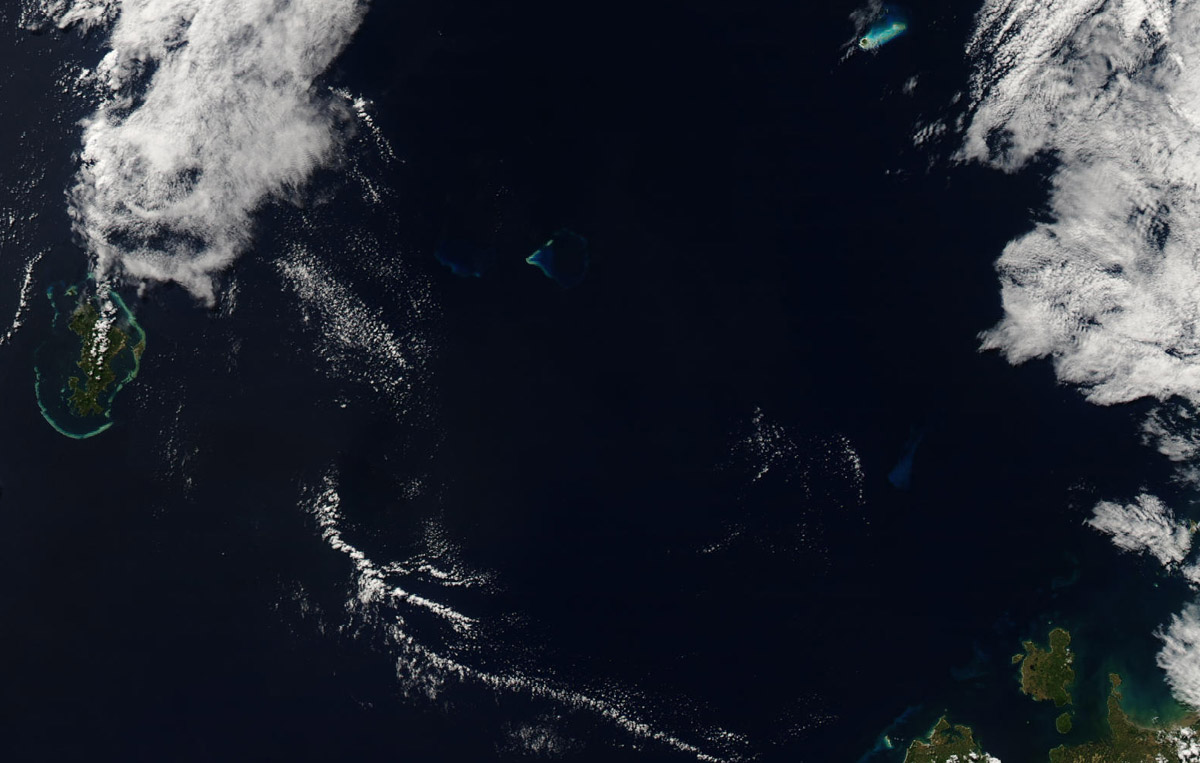
- Satellite image of Banc du Geyser (center) with Mayotte (left), the Glorioso Islands (top right) and Madagascar (bottom right)

- Other names: Banc du Geysir, Arecife de Santo Antonio

Geography
- Location: Mozambique Channel
- Coordinates: 12°19′12″S 46°27′00″E
- Archipelago: Comoro Islands
- Length: 8 km (5 mi)(low tide only)
- Width: 5 km (3.1 mi)(low tide only)
- Highest elevation: 8 m (26 ft)
- Highest point: South Rock

Administration
- France

Claimed by
- Comoros
- Madagascar

Demographics
- Population: 0

Banc du Geyser (also Banc du Geysir) is a mostly submerged reef in the Mozambique Channel's northeastern part, 125 km (78 mi) northeast from Mayotte, 112 km (70 mi) southwest of the Glorioso Islands and 200 km (124 mi) off the northwestern coast of Madagascar.

== Description ==
The Banc is a dangerous oval-shaped reef 8 km (5 mi) long and 5 km (3 mi) wide that becomes exposed only at low tides, with the exception of some rock formations in the southern part of the reef. The rocks are generally 1.5 to 3 m (5 to 10 ft) in height; the largest is South Rock, with a height of 8 m (26 ft), similar to a boat under sail.

In the eastern part of the reef there are some sandy cays, 1 to 3 m (3 to 10 ft) in height covered with grass and small bushes. The entrance into the central lagoon is possible from a south-southeastern direction. There is an abundance of seabirds, and the cays are covered in tons of guano.

About 20 km (12 mi) southwest of Geysir is Zélée Bank, a deep submarine feature.

== History ==
The Geysir Reef was first known by Arab sailors around the year 700, and was shown on some navigation-charts dated around 800. Around 1650 the reef was shown on Spanish maps as Arecife de Santo Antonio. The current name was given on 23 December 1678, when a British vessel, Geysir, ran on the reef.

France and the Comoros claim the Banc du Geyser as part of their exclusive economic zone (EEZ). The reef is also claimed by Madagascar. From the French point of view, it is a part of the EEZ of Glorioso Islands, one of their Scattered Islands in the Indian Ocean. Madagascar announced its annexation in 1976, presumably because of the possibility of oil fields in the vicinity but the Banc du Geyser is controlled in fact by the French forces armées de la zone sud de l'océan Indien.

In 2012, France included the reef in the parc naturel marin des Glorieuses, a marine protected area, to preserve the endangered flora and fauna of the Glorioso Islands.

The Scattered Islands in the Indian Ocean are partially claimed by the Comoros, Madagascar, and Mauritius. The Malagasy and Mauritian claims, however, are significantly later than their access to independence. The agreement reached in October 2024 on the restitution to Mauritius of the Chagos Islands by Great Britain, in the heart of the Indian Ocean, notably home to the American base of Diego Garcia, has relaunched the debate in Madagascar.
