= Scattered Islands in the Indian Ocean =

Islands, atoll, and reef in the Indian Ocean

Scattered Islands in the Indian Ocean Îles Éparses de l'océan Indien (French)
- Flag of the French Southern and Antarctic Lands Coat of arms
- Motto: "Liberté, égalité, fraternité" (French) (English: "Liberty, equality, fraternity")
- Anthem: La Marseillaise ("The Marseillaise")
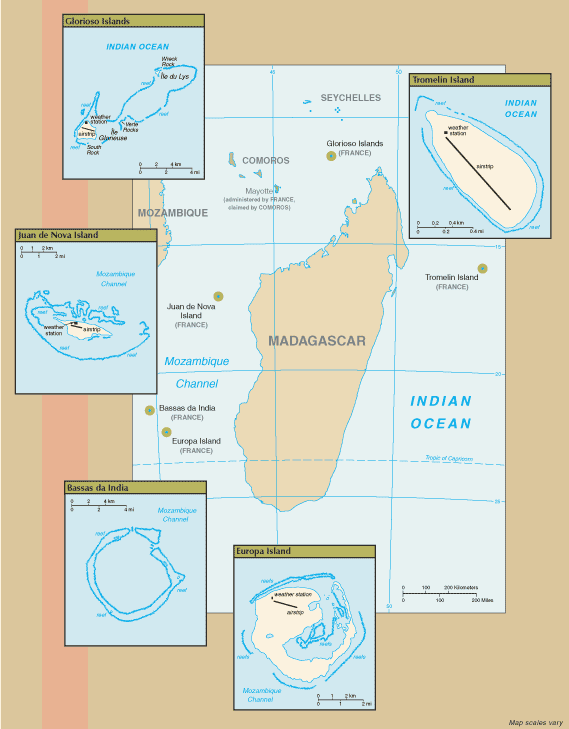
- Maps of the Scattered Islands in the Indian Ocean. Anti-clockwise from top right: Tromelin Island, Glorioso Islands, Juan de Nova Island, Bassas da India, and Europa Island. Banc du Geyser is not shown.
- Status: District of French Southern and Antarctic Lands
- Disputed with Madagascar, the Comoros, and Mauritius

The Scattered Islands in the Indian Ocean (French: Îles Éparses or Îles Éparses de l'océan Indien) consist of four small coral islands and an atoll, as well as a reef in the Indian Ocean; they constitute the fifth district of the French Southern and Antarctic Lands, though sovereignty over some or all of the islands is contested by the Comoros, Madagascar, and Mauritius. None of the islands have ever had a permanent population, though the French armed forces maintain small troop contingents on some of the islands.

Two of the coral islands—Europa Island and Juan de Nova Island—and the Bassas da India atoll lie in the Mozambique Channel, while a third coral island—Tromelin Island—lies about 450 kilometres (280 mi) east of Madagascar. The Glorioso Islands lie about 200 kilometres (120 mi) northwest of Madagascar, and Banc du Geyser, a mostly submerged reef in the Mozambique Channel, is claimed by France as being part of their exclusive economic zone.

The extent of the exclusive economic zones granted by the ownership of the islands grants them strategic importance. France bases small detachments of military personnel on the islands to assert its presence and sovereignty over them.

The islands have been declared as nature reserves. Except for Bassas da India, they all support meteorological stations: those on the Glorioso Islands, Juan de Nova, and Europa Island are automated. The station on Tromelin Island, in particular, provides warning of cyclones threatening Madagascar, Mauritius, and Réunion. Each of the islands, except Bassas da India, has an airstrip with a length in excess of 1,000 metres (3,300 ft).

The Scattered Islands in the Indian Ocean are partially claimed by the Comoros, Madagascar, and Mauritius. The debate has been relaunched in Madagascar after an agreement on the restitution to Mauritius of the Chagos Islands by the United Kingdom was reached in October 2024.

== Overview ==
Island / Atoll	Station Staff	Area (km^{2})	Lagoon (km^{2})	EEZ (km^{2})	Coordinates	Location
Glorioso Islands (including Banc du Geyser)	11	5	29.6	48,350	11°33′S 47°20′E	Northern Mozambique Channel
Tromelin Island	19	0.8	–	280,000	15°53′S 54°31′E	Western Indian Ocean
Juan de Nova Island	14	4.4	^{(1)}	61,050	17°03′S 42°45′E	Central Mozambique Channel
Bassas da India	–	0.2	79.8	123,700	21°27′S 39°45′E	Southern Mozambique Channel
Europa Island	12	28	9	127,300	22°20′S 40°22′E	Southern Mozambique Channel
Total	56	38.4	118.4	640,400		

== Individual islands ==
- Bassas da India
  - Ten unnamed rock islets
- Europa Island
  - Île Europa
  - Eight unnamed rock islets
- Glorioso Islands
  - Banc du Geyser
  - Grande Glorieuse
  - Île du Lys
  - South Rock
  - Verte Rocks (three islets)
  - Wreck Rock
  - Three unnamed islets
- Juan de Nova Island
- Tromelin Island

== Administration ==
Since January 3, 2005, the Scattered Islands have been administered on behalf of the French state by the senior administrator of the French Southern and Antarctic Lands, based in Réunion. The Scattered Islands had previously been under the administration of the prefect of Réunion since the independence of Madagascar in 1960. France maintains a military garrison of around 14 troops on each of the islands in the Mozambique Channel that are claimed by Madagascar. The troops are supported by French naval vessels based in Réunion conducting patrol missions and re-supply operations about four times per year. The Glorioso Islands are also claimed by the Comoros, while Mauritius claims Tromelin Island.

France has an exclusive economic zone (EEZ) of 200 nautical miles (370 km) around each of the small islands in the Scattered Islands, which together with the EEZ claims for the islands of Mayotte and Réunion totals more than one million square kilometres (400,000 sq mi) in the western Indian Ocean. There is considerable overlap of the EEZ with the neighbouring states.

== Sovereignty dispute ==
Mauritius, Madagascar, and the Comoros dispute France's sovereignty over these islands. Mauritius claims Tromelin Island and states that the island, discovered by France in 1722, was not ceded by the Treaty of Paris in 1814. Madagascar claims sovereignty over the Glorioso Islands (including Banc du Geyser), though the island group was never a part of the Malagasy Protectorate, having been a part of the Colony of Mayotte and dependencies, then a part of the French Comoros that had become a separately administered colony from Madagascar in 1946. The Comoros also claims the Glorioso Islands (including Banc du Geyser), as a part of the disputed French region of Mayotte. Seychelles claimed a part of the Scattered Islands too before the signing of the France–Seychelles Maritime Boundary Agreement.

Furthermore, Madagascar has also claimed Bassas da India, Europa Island, and Juan de Nova Island since 1972, and a 1979 United Nations resolution (without binding force) demanded the cession of these islands to Madagascar. A negotiation session between France and Madagascar took place in November 2020. In April 2025, France and Madagascar announced that they would meet in June 2025 to find a peaceful solution to the dispute. President Emmanuel Macron favors a form of co-management with Madagascar, rather than restitution. On June 20, 2025, Malagasy Foreign Minister Rasata Rafaravavitafika chaired a meeting of the scientific committee devoted to Madagascar's claim to the Scattered Islands. The objective of this meeting was to develop arguments for preserving Madagascar's sovereignty over the Scattered Islands, while moving forward in discussions with France. On June 24, 2025, the Malagasy platform "Sehatry ny Raiamandreny" (Sera) affirmed the indefatigability of Madagascar's claim to the territories of the Scattered Islands. The second commission, between France and Madagascar, met on June 30, 2025, for bilateral discussions on congestion, or the restitution of the Scattered Islands to Madagascar. On June 26, 2025, France published the lists of negotiators at the meeting of June 30, 2025, between Madagascar and France.

== See also ==
- Administrative divisions of France
- French Southern and Antarctic Lands
- List of territorial disputes
- Overseas France
