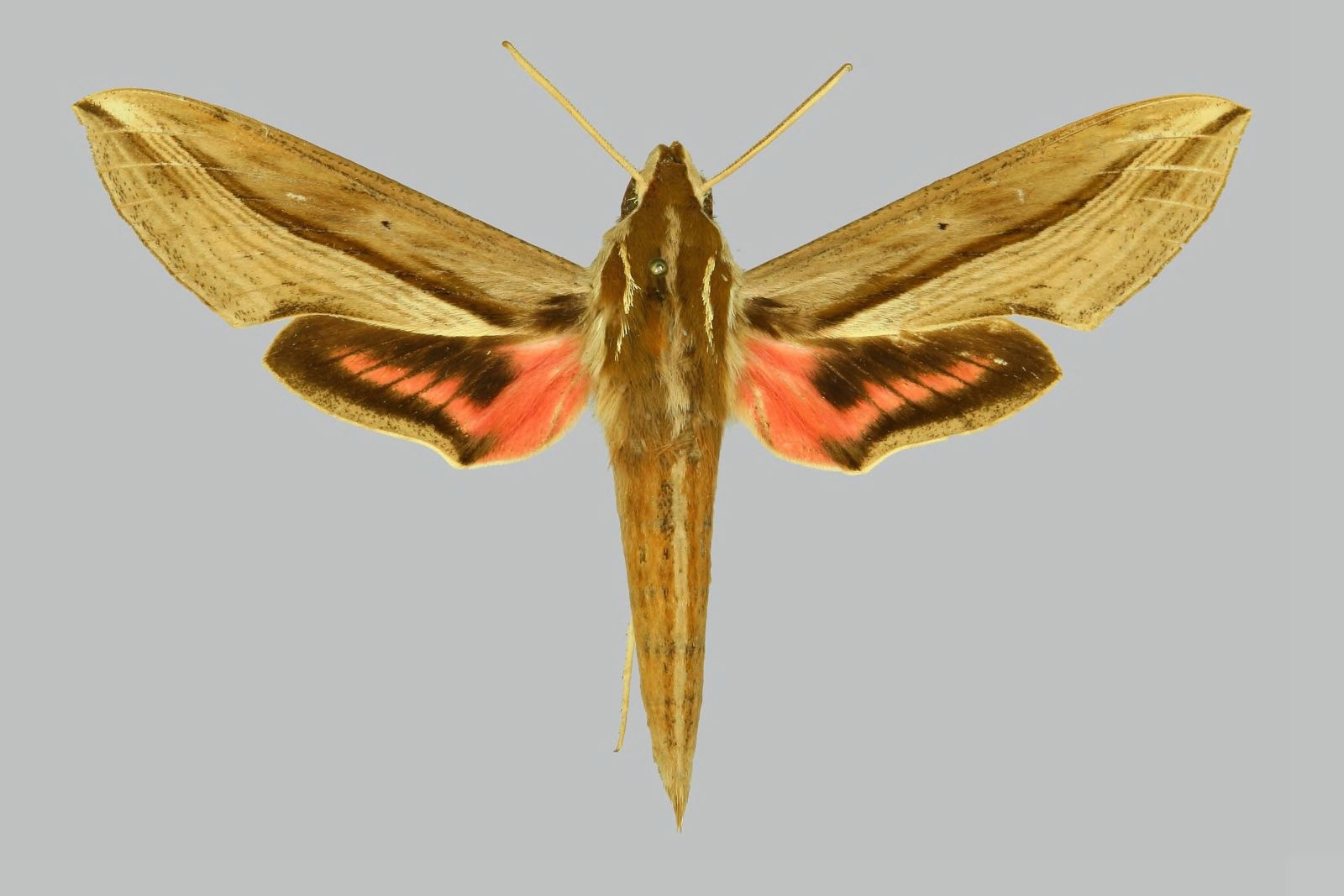
- Male

Scientific classification
- Kingdom: Animalia
- Phylum: Arthropoda
- Class: Insecta
- Order: Lepidoptera
- Family: Sphingidae
- Genus: Hippotion
- Species: H. aurora

Binomial name
- Hippotion aurora Rothschild & Jordan, 1903

= Hippotion aurora =

Species of moth

Hippotion aurora is a moth of the family Sphingidae. It is known from Madagascar, Assumption Island, the Farquhar Islands and the Glorioso Islands.

It is similar to Hippotion celerio, but the forewing pattern is less contrasting and the pink coloration of the hindwing upperside is deeper pink. The forewing upperside is similar to Hippotion celerio and Hippotion osiris but the oblique and transverse lines reduced in intensity. The hindwing upperside is most similar to Hippotion aporodes but the pink spots of median band are somewhat more sharply defined.

== Subspecies ==
- Hippotion aurora aurora (Madagascar and the Assumption Island)
- Hippotion aurora delicata Rothschild & Jordan, 1915 (Farquhar Islands)
- Hippotion aurora gloriosana Rothschild & Jordan, 1915 (Glorioso Islands)
