= Mayotte Marine Natural Park =

Marine Park in the Comoro Islands

- French: Parc naturel marin de Mayotte
- IUCN category V (protected landscape/seascape)
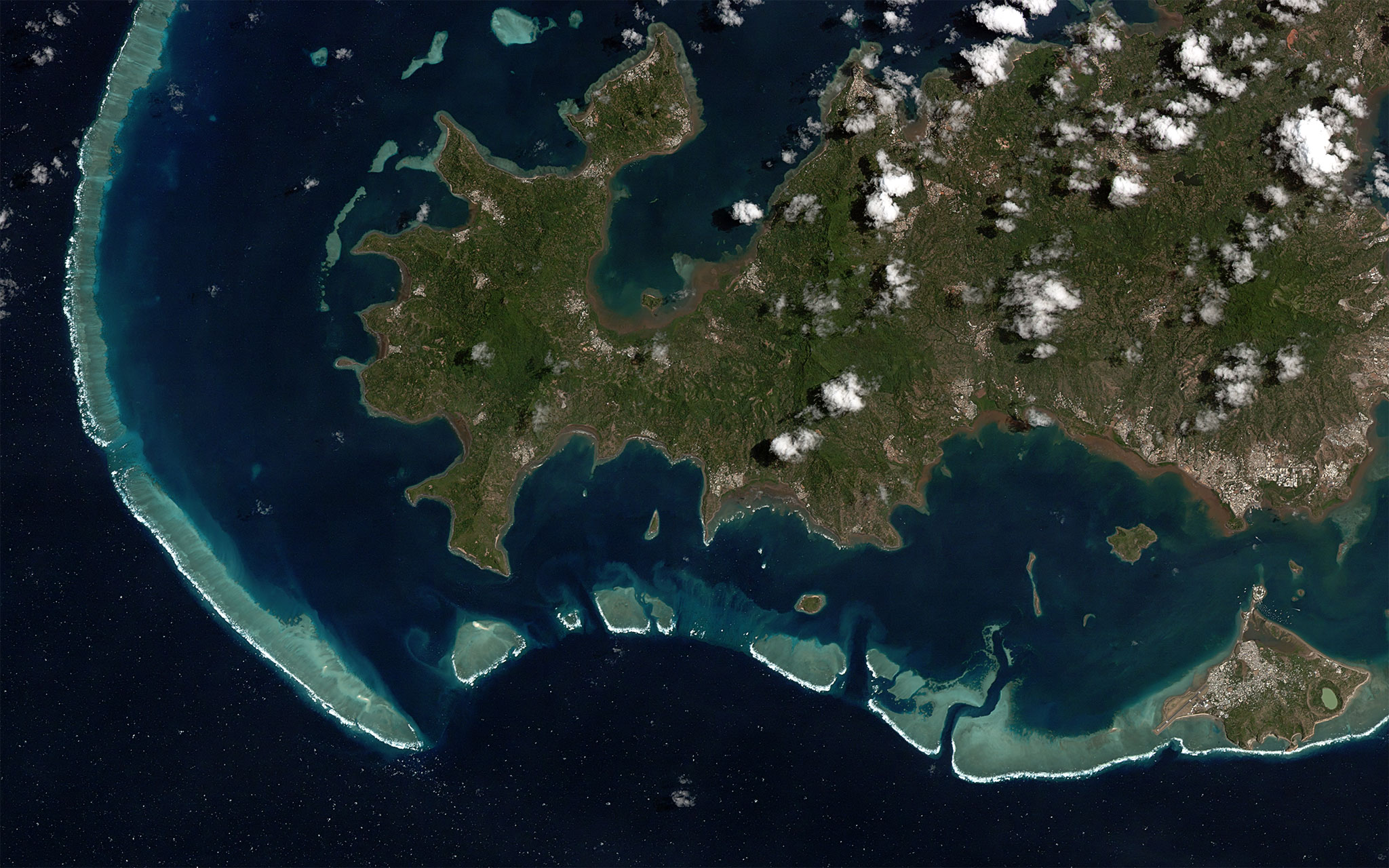
- Barrier reefs separate Mayotte's lagoon from the ocean

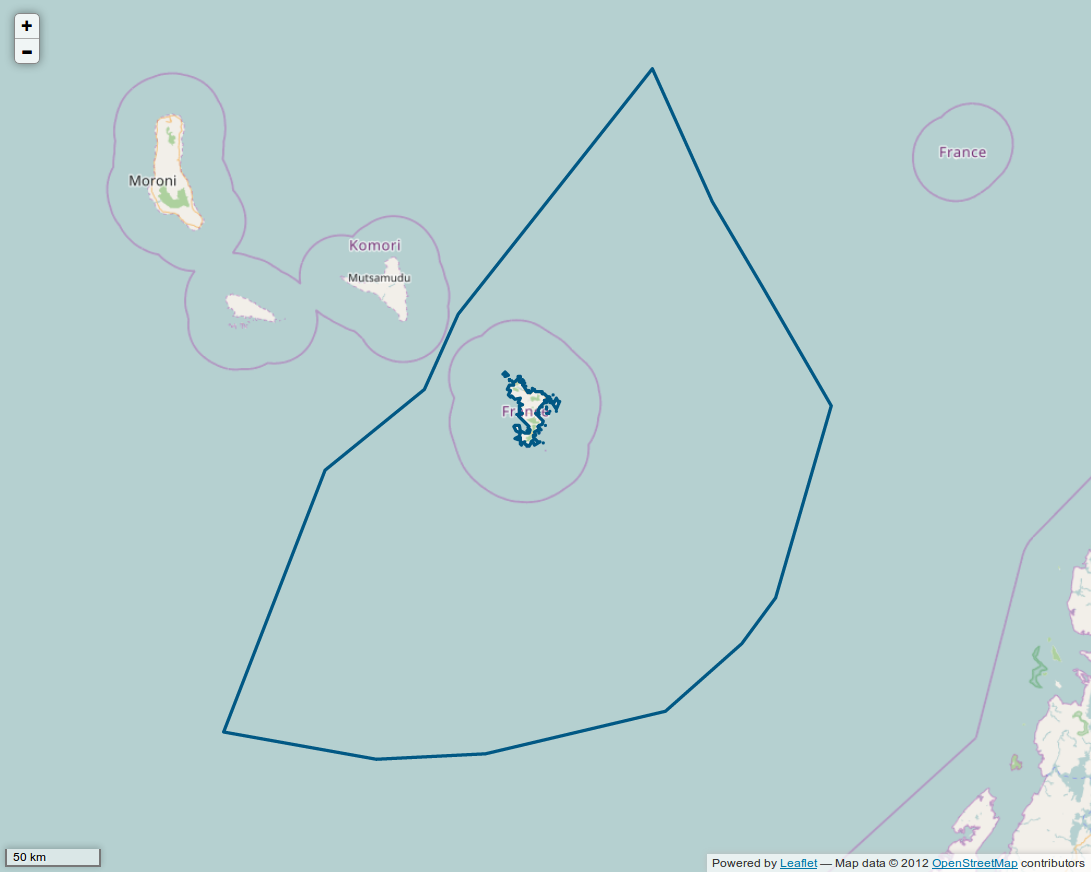
- Borders of Mayotte's EEZ, which the marine natural park entirely covers
- Location: Mayotte
- Area: 68,300 km^{2} (26,400 sq mi)
- Established: 2010

The Mayotte Marine Natural Park (French: Parc naturel marin de Mayotte) is a marine park surrounding Mayotte, a French overseas region. Mayotte is part of the Comoro Islands archipelago, which lies within the Mozambique Channel in the western Indian Ocean. Established in 2010, the park covers the entirety of Mayotte's territorial waters and exclusive economic zone. It is contiguous with the Glorioso Islands Marine Natural Park, which was established two years later.

Habitats within the park include coral reefs, seagrass meadows, and the open ocean. There is a significant level of biodiversity, which includes a number of rare and endangered species. The park is important not just for wildlife, but for the people of Mayotte, with marine products being economically important to the territory.

== Geography ==
The marine natural park covers the entirety of Mayotte's territorial waters and EEZ, totalling 68,300 square kilometres (26,400 sq mi). The reefs and lagoons surround over 30 islands and islets, in addition to the main island of Grande-Terre. The park is adjacent to the Glorioso Islands Marine Natural Park, together forming a contiguous protected area covering 110,000 square kilometres (42,000 sq mi).

The northern Mozambique channel, which the park lies within, is considered a hotspot for marine diversity. Mayotte's waters border those of Comoros, Madagascar, and the French territory of the Glorioso Islands, which is part of the French Southern and Antarctic Lands.

== History ==
The park was designated in 2010 through a Presidential decree issued on 18 January. It is the first marine natural park established outside of Metropolitan France. Its creation may have been partially based on an attempt by France to better control the Mayotte area, which is claimed by Comoros.

== Marine biodiversity ==
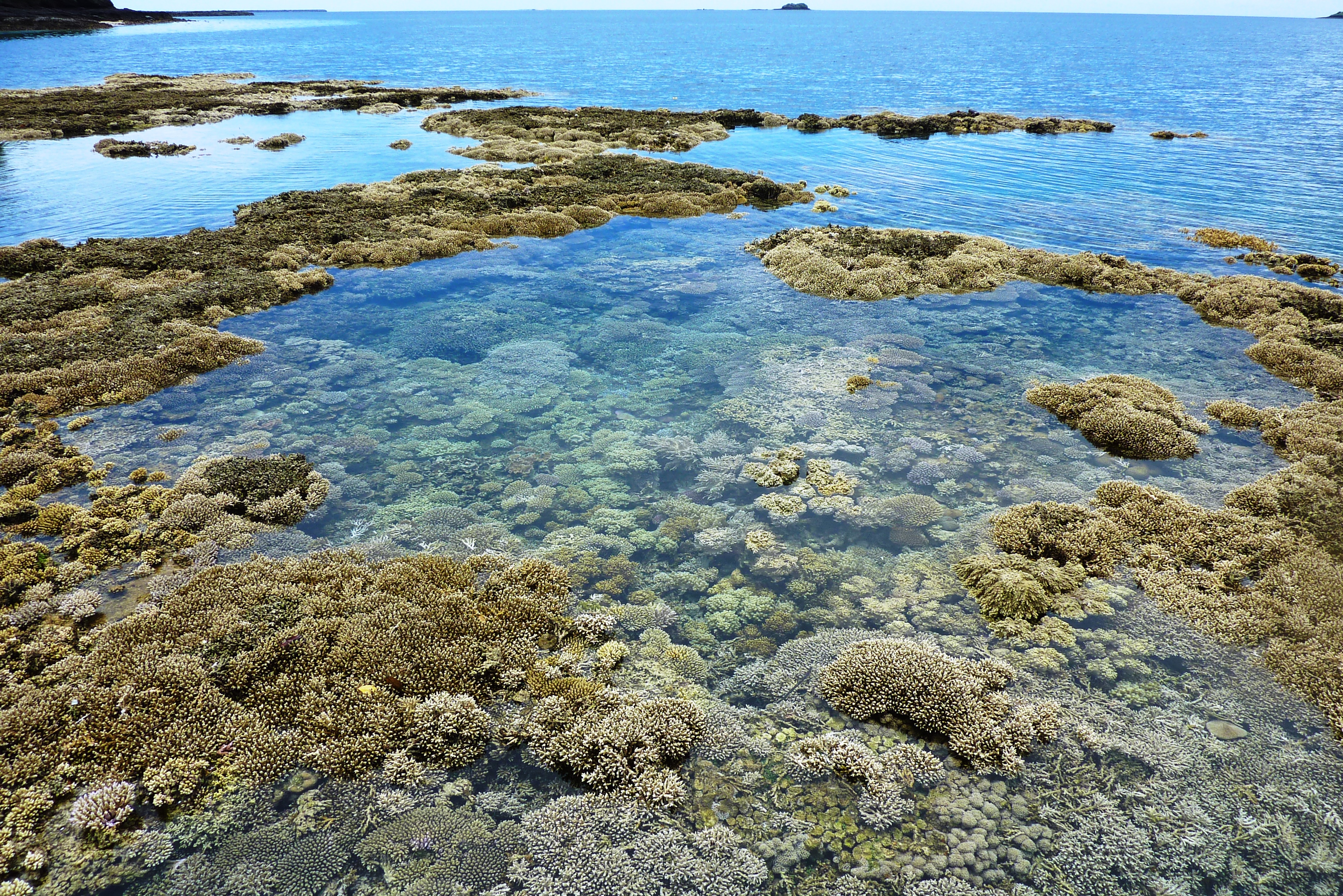
Some coral reefs are exposed at low tide.

Mayotte has a rare lagoon surrounded by two barrier reefs, which ranged from 30 metres (98 ft) to 80 metres (260 ft) deep. The outer barrier reef stretches over 179 kilometres (111 mi), with a width ranging from 800 metres (2,600 ft) to 1,500 metres (4,900 ft). Discontinuous internal reefs spanning 12 kilometres (7.5 mi) to the southwest of the island form the second barrier. Fringing reefs totalling 160 kilometres (99 mi) surround the main island and various islets. The reefs around Mayotte have the same composition as those in Comoros.

Species that have been identified include 760 fish species, 581 arthropod species, 450 cnidarian species, and 24 marine mammals, 24 fish species are on the IUCN Red List, including the endangered great hammerheads and humphead wrasse. 8 of the coral species are protected by CITES. 971 species of molluscs have been identified, along with 597 crustaceans. The 89 species of echinoderms known include commercially valuable sea cucumbers. The reef fish population of Mayotte is more diverse than those of Réunion or the Scattered Islands in the Indian Ocean.

Seagrass beds in sheltered areas support wildlife such as turtles and dugongs. 40 fish species have been found only around seagrass beds. Around 2000 turtles are estimated to live within the Mayotte lagoon. Five different turtle species are found around Mayotte, some of which nest on the region's beaches. 96 sponge species have been identified within the lagoon.

Risks facing Mayotte's biodiversity include pollution, habitat degradation, habitat destruction, invasive species, and climate change. Only 12% of the area within the lagoon are considered to be of good quality. By 2010, 50% of Mayotte's coral reefs were bleached. In some areas, reef coverage is so degraded they are almost completely gone. Some areas of coral have been seen to regenerate after bleaching events. The population of dugongs is perhaps as low as 10, following a history of unsustainable hunting. The Indo-Pacific humpback dolphin population in Mayotte is thought to be too small to survive.

== Governance ==
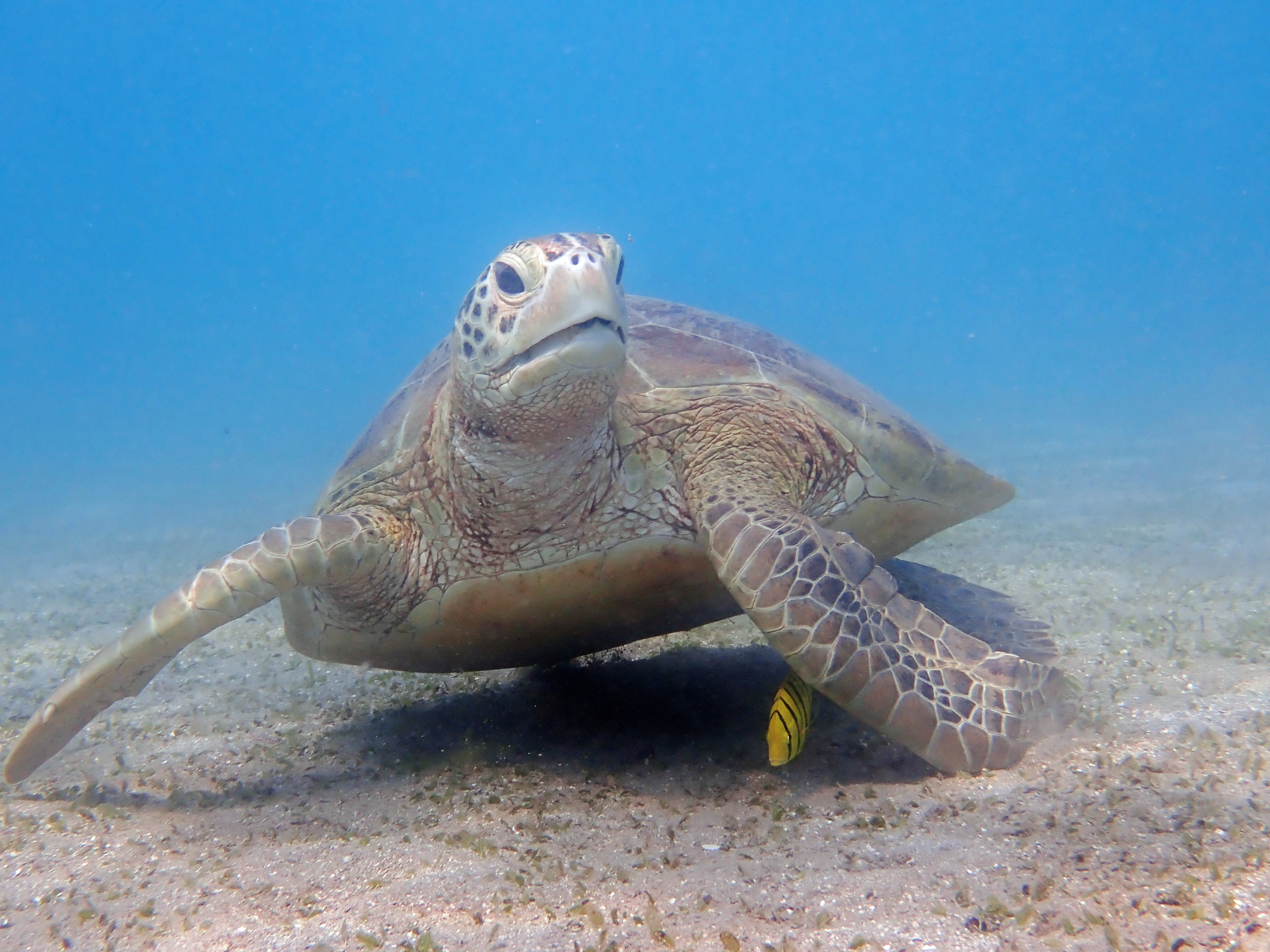
Turtles within the park are covered by a national action plan.

The park is run by the French Agency for Biodiversity, and has a management board consisting of 41 members, including representatives of state and local government, professional organisations, local society, and environmental groups. The board develops an action plan for each year. A 15-year management plan was established in January 2013.

The park is responsible for implementing the National Action Plan for sea turtles in its area of jurisdiction. A National Action Plan for dugongs was implemented in 2012. The park also supports educational activities for schools in Mayotte. Some conservation programmes are conducted jointly with the TAAF administration, which runs the neighbouring Glorioso Islands Marine Natural Park.

The France Nature Environnement organisation has criticised the level of actual protection, noting commercial fishing continues within the park. Most fishing however remains line fishing. Oceanic tuna fishing vessels are not allowed to fish within 24 miles of the coast. Marine products make up 63% of Mayotte's exports.

The park is listed under the IUCN protected area categories system as a protected seascape (category V).
