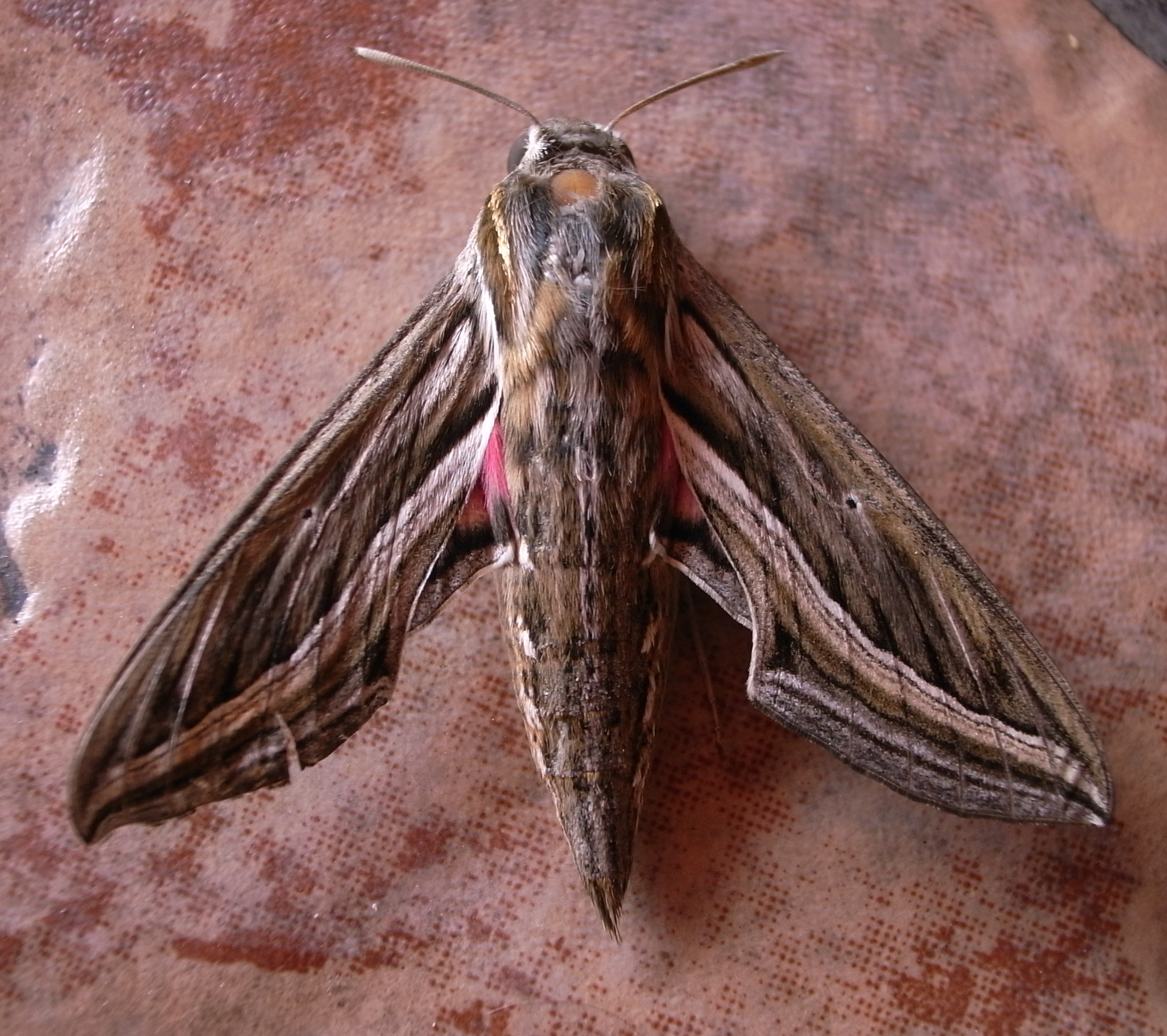

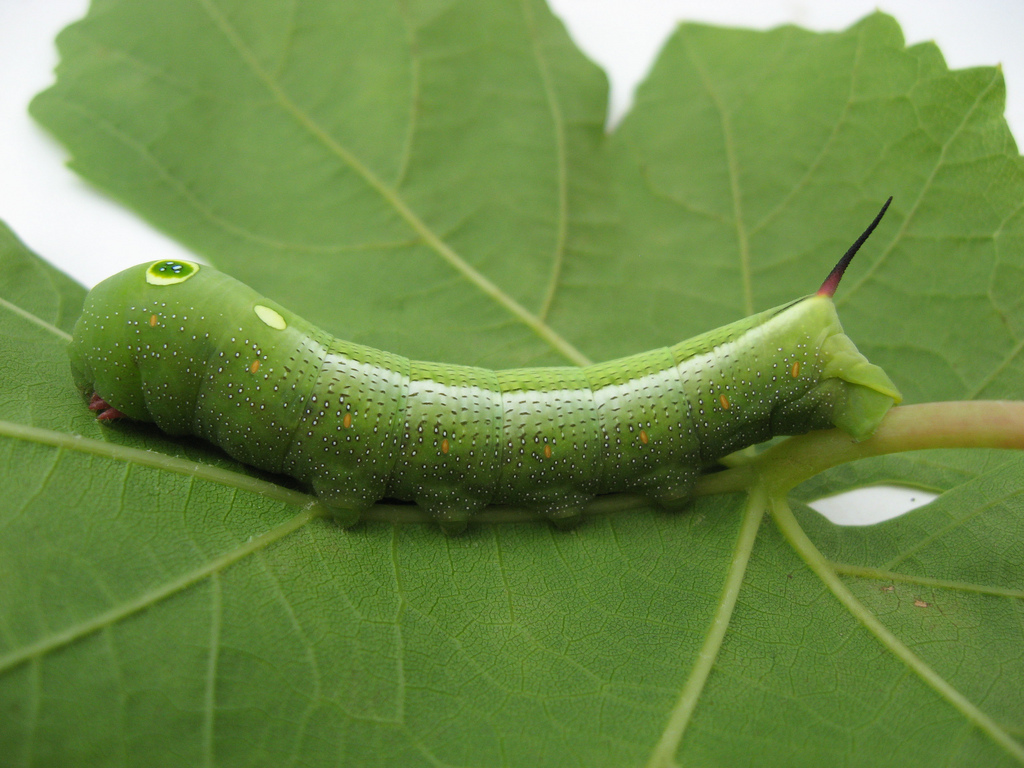

Scientific classification
- Kingdom: Animalia
- Phylum: Arthropoda
- Class: Insecta
- Order: Lepidoptera
- Family: Sphingidae
- Genus: Hippotion
- Species: H. celerio

Binomial name
- Hippotion celerio (Linnaeus, 1758)
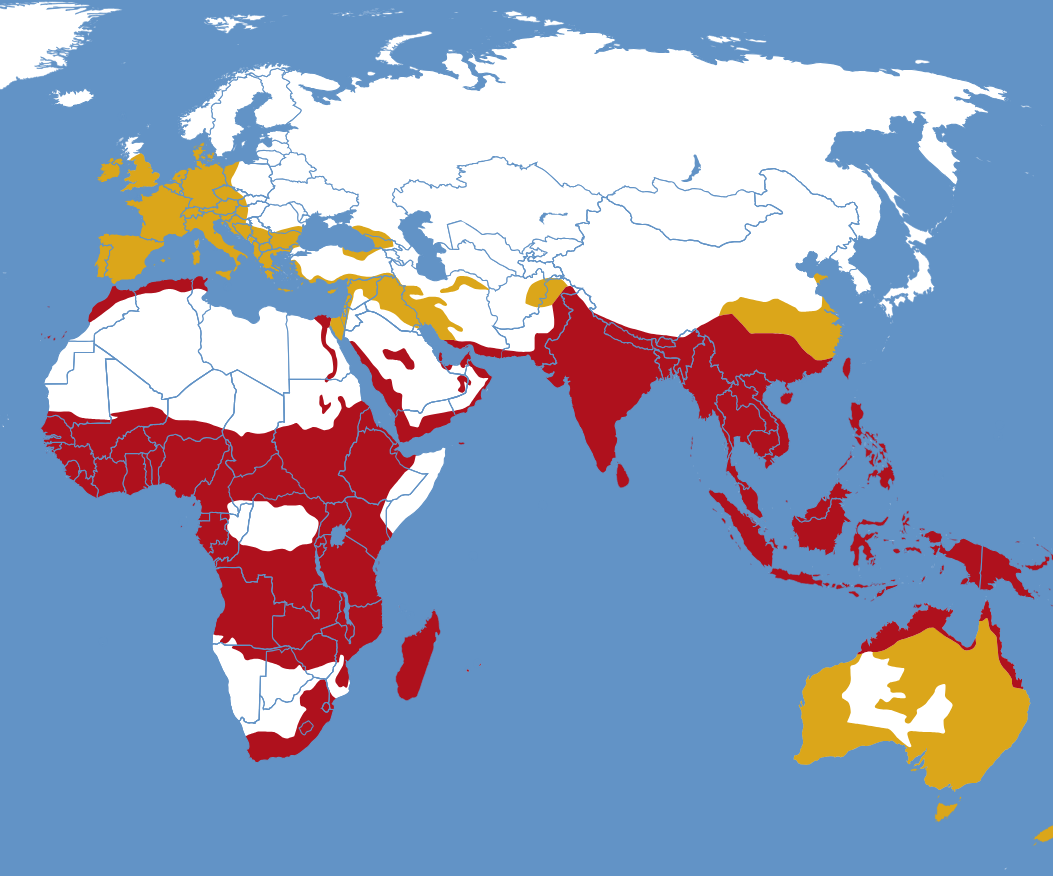
- resident range migrant range Note: Delineation between resident and migrant ranges cannot be clearly defined in North Africa and Europe.

Synonyms
- Sphinx celerio Linnaeus, 1758; Sphinx tisiphone Linnaeus, 1758; Phalaena inquilinus Harris, 1780; Elpenor phoenix Oken, 1815; Deilephila albolineata Montrousier, 1864; Hippotion ocys Hübner, 1819; Hippotion celerio unicolor Tutt, 1904; Hippotion celerio sieberti (Closs, 1910); Hippotion celerio rosea (Closs, 1911); Hippotion celerio pallida Tutt, 1904; Hippotion celerio luecki Closs, 1912; Hippotion celerio brunnea Tutt, 1904; Deilephila celerio augustii (Trimoulet, 1858)

= Hippotion celerio =

Silver-striped hawk-moth

Species of moth

Hippotion celerio, the vine hawk-moth or silver-striped hawk-moth, is a moth of the family Sphingidae. It was described by Carl Linnaeus in his 1758 10th edition of Systema Naturae.

== Distribution ==
It is found in Africa and central and southern Asia of India, Sri Lanka and, as a migrant in southern Europe and Australia.

== Description ==
The forewing is typically 28–45 millimetres (1.1–1.8 in) long.

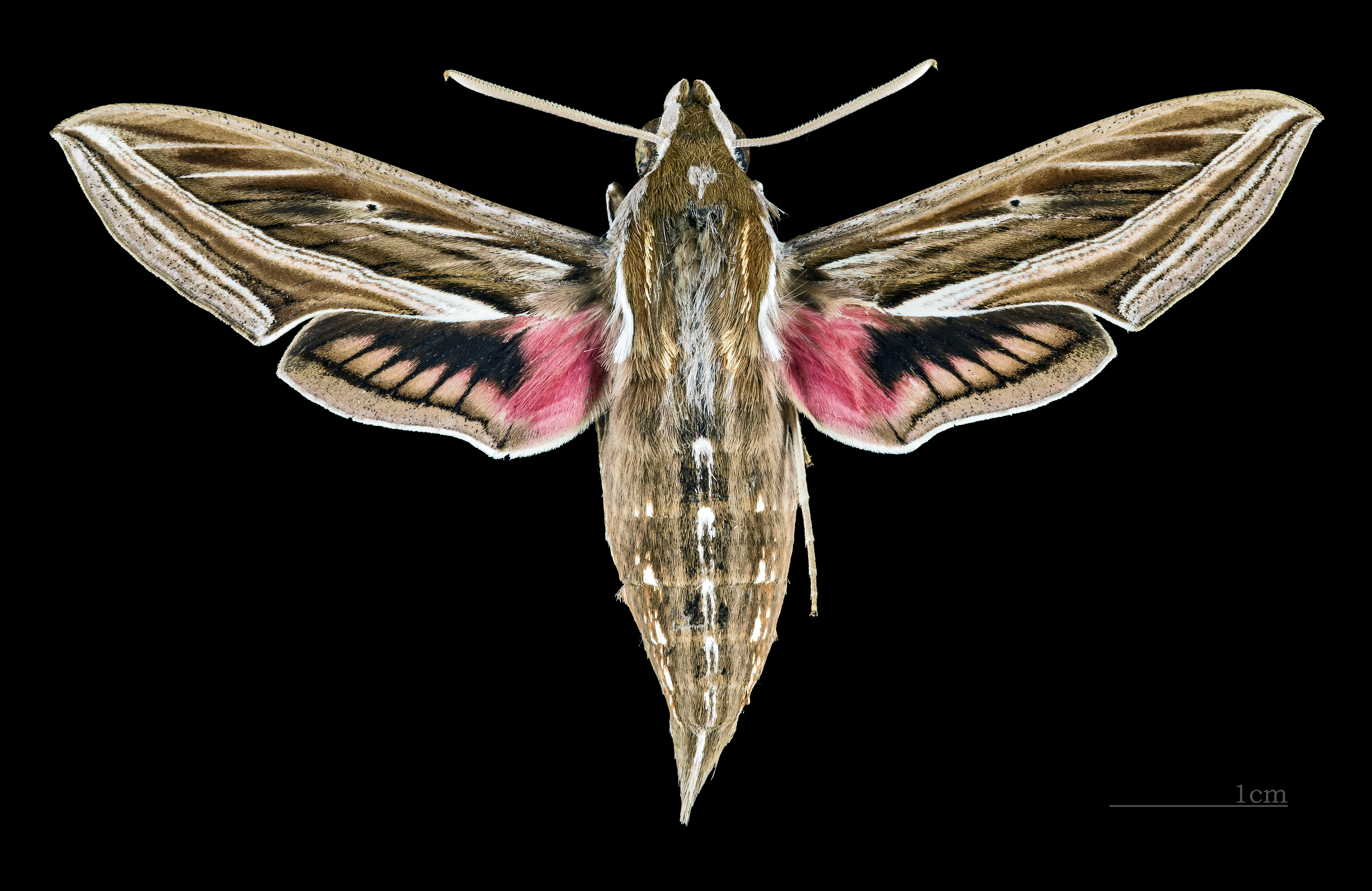
male

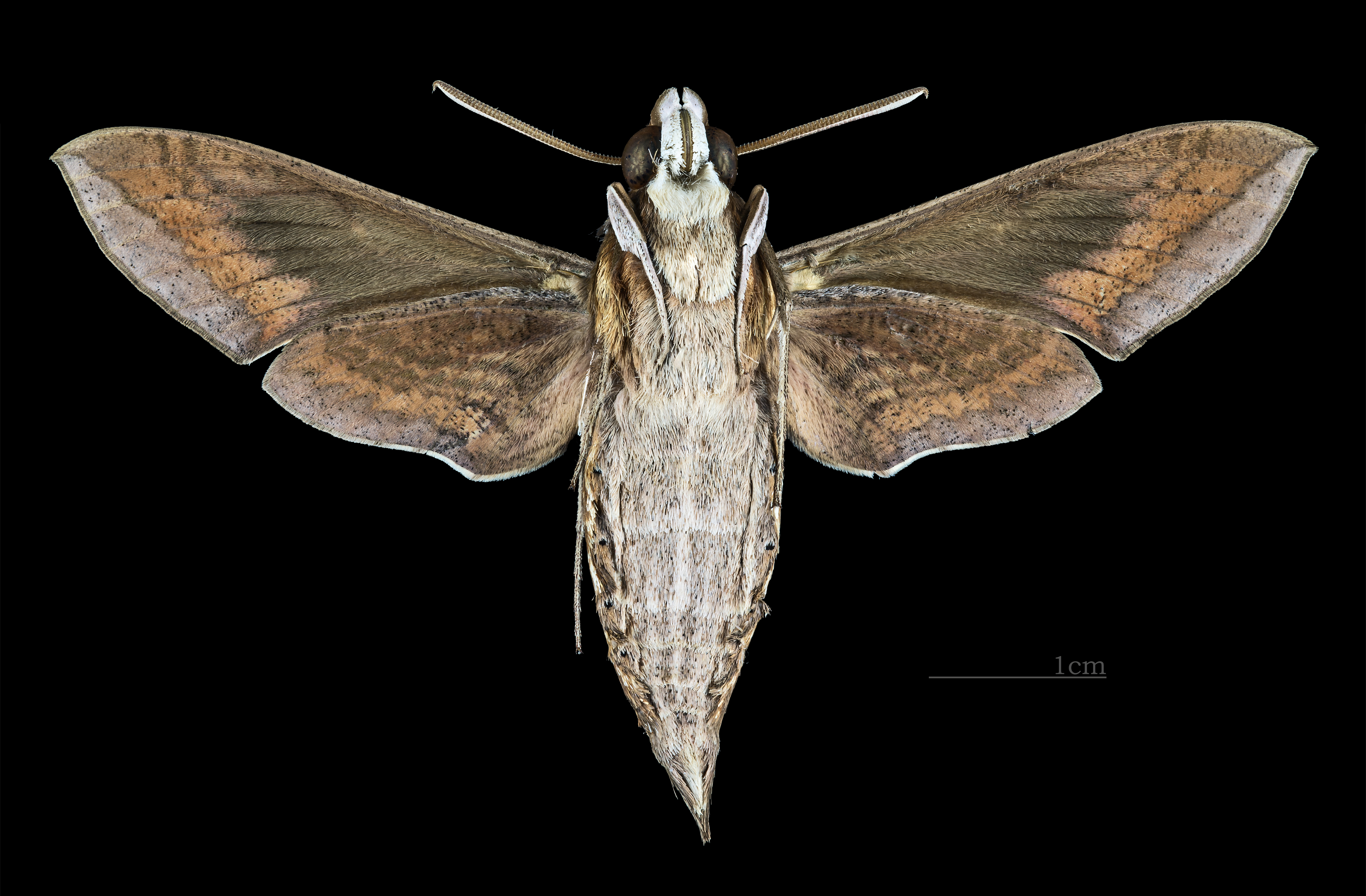
male underside

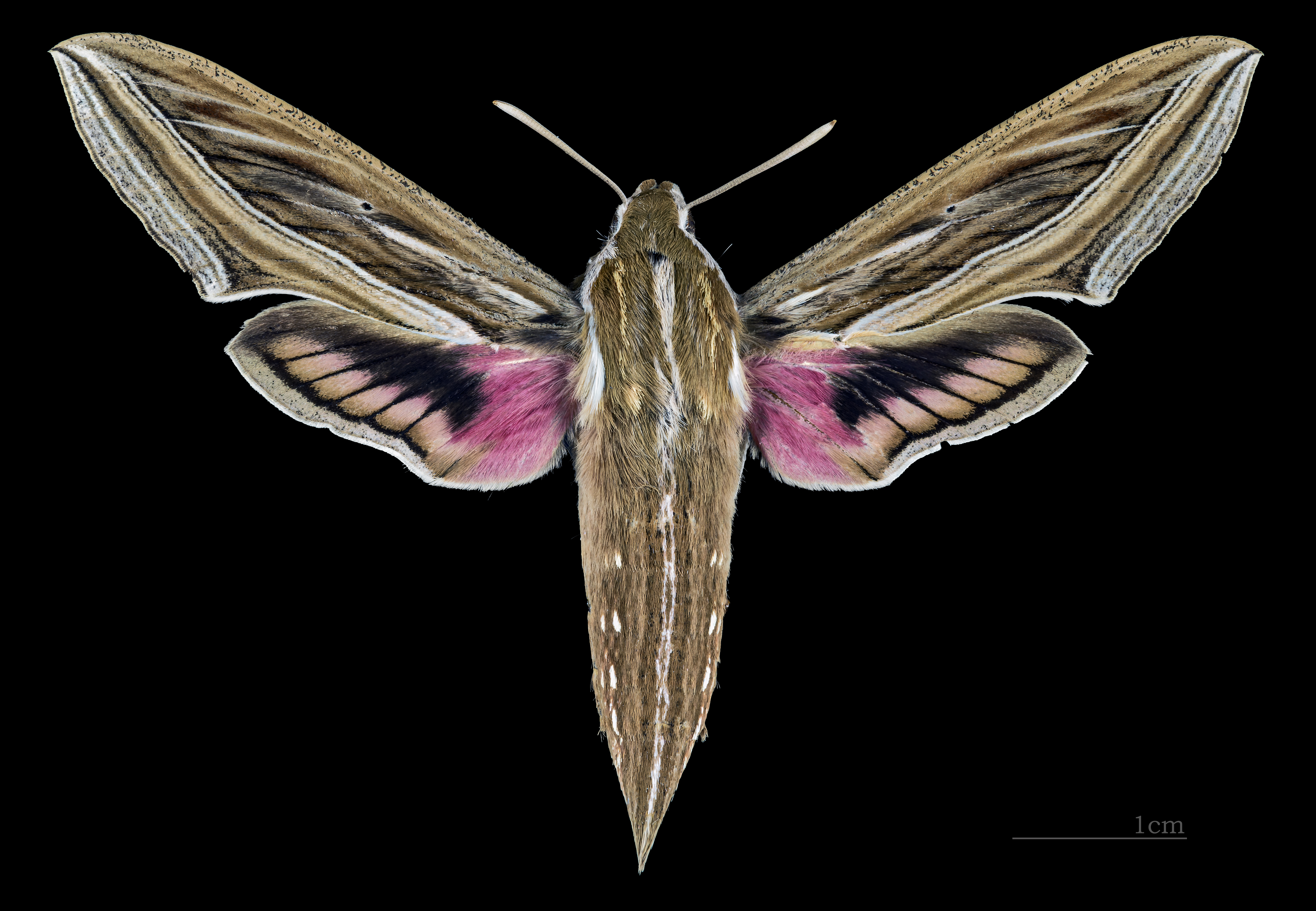
female

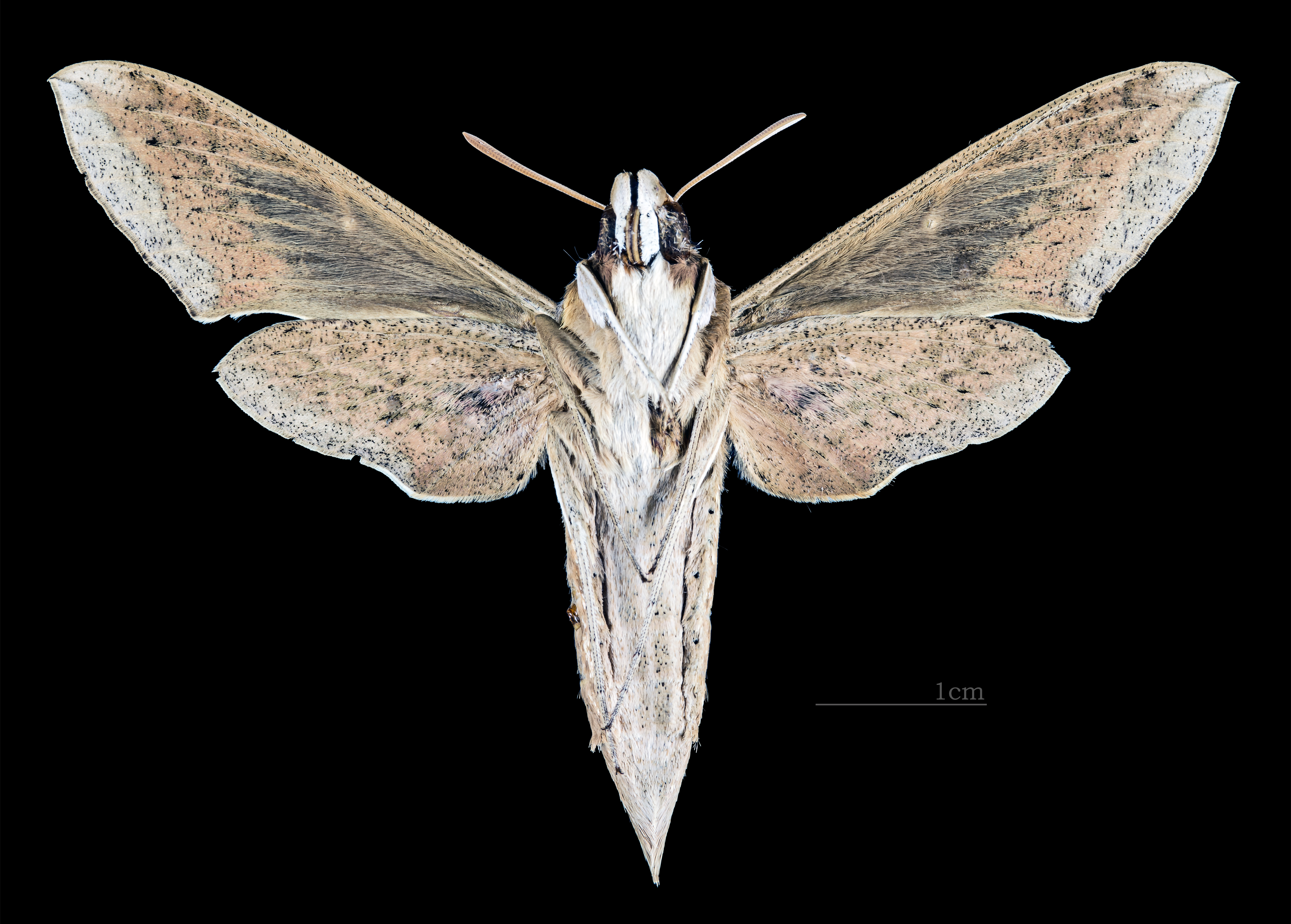
female underside

=== Colouring and marks ===
The body and forewing of the adult moth are green and ochre. They have silvery white dots and streaks, with a silvery band running obliquely on the forewing. The hindwing is red near its lower angle (tornus) to pinkish over other parts of the wing. It is crossed by a black bar and black veins. There is greater variation. In f. pallida Tutt the ground coloration is a pale terracotta ground; in f. rosea Closs, the wings have a red suffusion; in f. brunnea Tutt, the suffusion is deep brown. In f. augustei Trimoul, the black markings cover the entire wings; in f. luecki Closs, all silver markings are absent and in f. sieberti Closs, the forewing oblique stripe is yellowish, not silver.

== Similar species ==
- Hippotion osiris larger size and lacks the black venation on the hindwing.
- Hippotion aporodes may be only a very dark subspecies of celerio - in this form, the silvery streak on the forewing is not present but other markings are intensified. In addition, the hindwing is mainly brownish.

Head and thorax as in eson; abdomen with a white spot on each segment between the dorsal white lines; a pair of silvery lateral strigae on each segment. Fore wing paler; some silvery streaks on the median nervure; the nervules beyond the cell streaked with silvery white and black; a silvery-white line from apex to near base of inner margin, followed by some ochreous and pale brown lines; a white submarginal line; the markings are thus similar to oldenlandiae, except that the lines that come out white are different. Hind wing with the base and anal angle bright pink; disk blackish; the outer area ochreous brown, with a black submarginal line and the nervules between it and the cell black. Larva brown; a series of whitish ocelli with darker centers from 4th to 10th somites; horn and underside white.

— The Fauna of British India, Including Ceylon and Burma: Moths Volume I

== Biology ==
=== Larva ===
Larvae could be green, yellowish green or even brown. They have a dark broken mid-dorsal line and a creamy dorso-lateral line from the fifth segment to the horn. The head is round, and usually a dull green colour. The larva has a horn which is usually long and straight. There is a large yellow and green eyespot on the third segment and a smaller one on the fourth segment.

Larvae typically feed on the leaves of plants such as the grape vine, Cissus, Impatiens and the Arum lily.
