= Comoro Islands =

Archipelago in the Indian Ocean

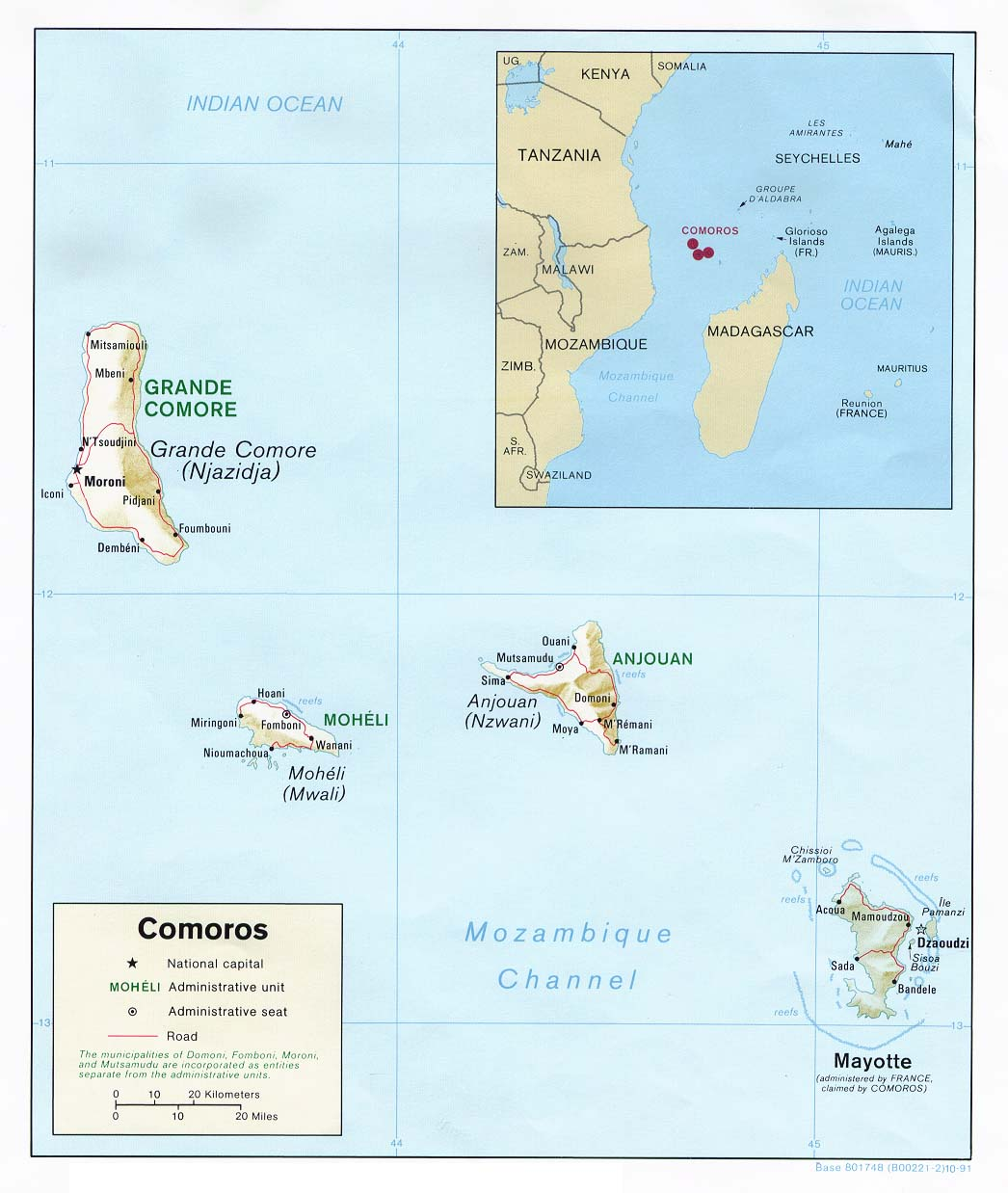
- Interactive map of Comoro Islands

Geography
- Location: Indian Ocean
- Coordinates: 12°12′S 44°15′E
- Total islands: 4
- Major islands: Grande Comore (Ngazidja), Mohéli (Mwali), Anjouan (Nzwani), Mayotte (Maore)
- Area: 2,034 km^{2} (785 sq mi)
- Highest elevation: 2,361 m (7746 ft)
- Highest point: Mount Karthala

Administration
- Comoros
- Autonomous islands: Grande Comore (Ngazidja); Mohéli (Mwali); Anjouan (Nzwani)
- Largest settlement: Moroni (capital) (pop. 60,200)
- President: Azali Assoumani
- France
- Overseas department: Mayotte
- Largest settlement: Mamoudzou (pop. 53,022)

Demographics
- Population: 1,008,246 (2016 est.)

The Comoro Islands are a group of volcanic islands in the Mozambique Channel, an arm of the Indian Ocean lying between Madagascar and the African mainland. Three of the islands form the Union of the Comoros, a sovereign nation, while Mayotte belongs to France.

== Geography ==
The Comoro Islands are located in the Mozambique Channel to the north-west of Madagascar and facing Mozambique. These volcanic islands, covering a total area of 2034 km^{2} (785 sq. mi.), are as follows:

- Ngazidja (also known as Grande Comore): the largest island of the Union of the Comoros, with its capital Moroni
- Ndzuwani (also known as Anjouan): part of the Union of the Comoros
- Mwali (also known as Mohéli): part of the Union of the Comoros
- Mayotte (also known as Maore): a French overseas department. Mayotte is composed of two islands, Grande-Terre and Petite-Terre (also known as Pamanzi), where the Dzaoudzi–Pamandzi International Airport is located.

The Glorioso Islands, comprising Grande Glorieuse, Île du Lys and eight little rock islets, were administratively attached to the archipelago before 1975, and, geologically speaking, form a part of the archipelago.

Notable reefs that are part of the archipelago are as follows:

- Banc Vailheu, or Raya, a submerged volcano located 20 km (10 miles) west of Grand Comoros
- Banc du Geyser, a reef measuring 8 by 5 km (5 by 3 miles) in area, situated 130 km (80 miles) North-East of Grande-Terre
- Banc du Leven, a former island between Madagascar and Grande-Terre which is now submerged

== History ==
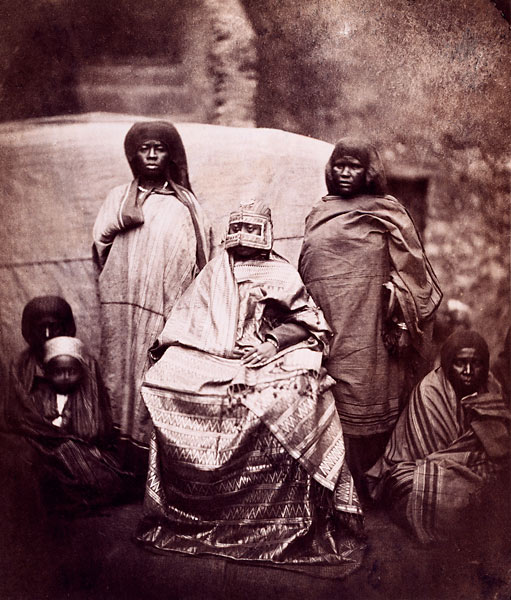
Jumbe-Soudi, queen of the Comorian island of Mohéli, receiving a French delegation, 1863.

The Comoros may have been settled as early as the 6th century; among the peoples who crossed the sea to populate the islands are Bantu-speaking peoples, Austronesian (including Malagasy), Arabs, Somalis, Portuguese, French, and Indians. Islam probably arrived during the 10th century. The Comoro Islands formed, with Zanzibar, Pemba, Lamu, and the coastal towns of Kenya and Tanzania, a united and prosperous region of Swahili culture, trading in local goods which were exported to the African coast, Madagascar, the Middle East and India. In that period, political power was in the hands of local rulers. During their explorations of the Comoros region, the Portuguese made landfall on the Islands of the Moon, in 1505; qamar is Arabic for moon.

During the colonial period, French settlers established plantations, initially producing sugar, an intensive process dependent on the labor of numerous Africans. In the twentieth century, they cultivated perfume plants and spices, such as ylang ylang, vanilla and cloves, as well as copra. In 1946, France redefined the Comoros as a French overseas territory.

In 1974, France organized a referendum for self-determination in the archipelago. Except in Mayotte, the population voted overwhelmingly in favour of independence. Following the unilateral declaration of independence in 1975, France maintained sovereignty over Mayotte.

The three remaining islands formed the Etat Comorian, which later became the Federal Islamic Republic of the Comoros Islands and is today the Union of the Comoros.

In 1996, Ethiopian Airlines Flight 961 was hijacked and crashed off the shore of the grande island. 125 people died on board, including the three hijackers who caused the crash. 50 people survived.

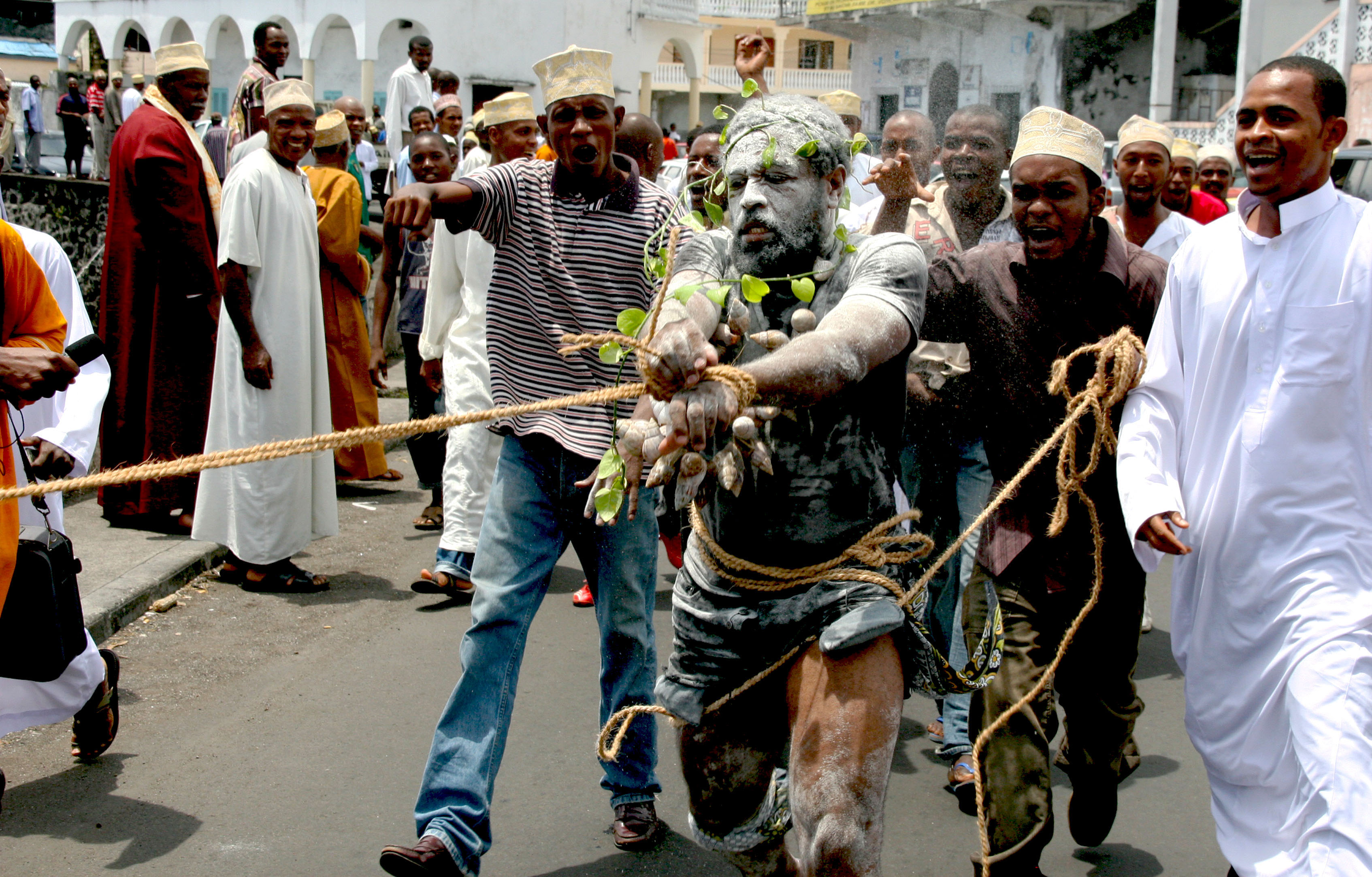
Comorans protest Mayotte referendum, 2009

In 1997, demands for increased autonomy on the islands of Ndzuani (Anjouan) and Mwali (Moheli) led to the breakup of the Federal Islamic Republic. In 2001, the government reformed as the Union of the Comoros under a new constitution which gave each of the three islands more autonomy than had been enjoyed previously. In 2008, the President of Anjouan refused to hold free elections. He was forced to flee following military intervention by troops of the Comorian Union and the African Union. The island country continues its present form of confederal government, albeit with minor changes approved in referendums in 2009 and 2018.

Mayotte, which had voted to retain French suzerainty in the 1975 referendum, expressed a wish to accede to the status of a département d'outre-mer (DOM) (Overseas Department) following another referendum held on the island on 29 March 2009. Mayotte officially became France's 101st department on 31 March 2011.

== Geology ==
The Comoros Archipelago consists of volcanic islands. These volcanic islands, together with the high mountains in the north of Madagascar, were formed in the Tertiary and Quaternary periods. The island of Mayotte is the oldest one still above sea level and underwent three volcanic phases between 15 million and 500,000 years ago. The ages progressively decrease from east to west. Grande Comore is the youngest island and is still volcanically active. Karthala, a shield volcano occupying some two thirds of the island, rises to 2361 meters (7746 feet). The summit caldera is quite large, being approximately 3 km × 4 km (1.9 mi × 2.5 mi) in size at the rim (2007).

== Climate ==
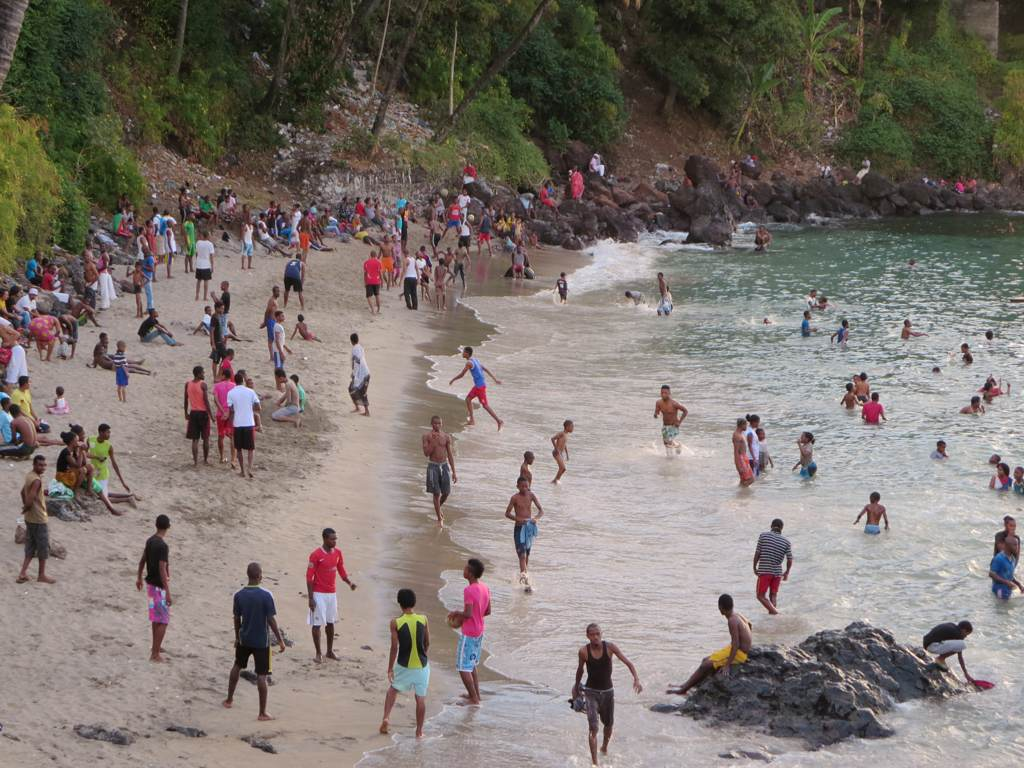
Anjouan Island

The Comoro Archipelago enjoys a tropical maritime climate, characterized by slight daytime temperature variations throughout the year of around 26 °C (78.8 °F) at sea level and by abundant precipitation: 2,679 mm (105.5 in) a year. The average temperature of the sea water is 25 °C (77 °F). There are two seasons in the Comoros: the hot and humid season flowing in from the north-west from November to April and the dry season from May to October. The climate on Mayotte is, nevertheless, noticeably warmer and drier. The climate is also characterized by important local variations in temperature and precipitation according to altitude, relief and the degree of exposure to the elements. Annual precipitation therefore varies in the region of 1,000 to 6,000 mm (40 to 240 in) and the absolute minimum of 0 °C (32 °F) is reached on the summit of Karthala.

The hot, dry season is caused by a vast low pressure area which extends over a large part of the Indian Ocean and Central Africa. This low pressure favours gusty winds and cyclones. The last cyclone was Cyclone Gafilo, which passed close to the Comoros on 5 March 2004 causing great material damage. During the hot and humid season it can rain as much as 200 mm (8 in) in twenty-four hours. The dry season is calmer. The low pressure moves towards the continent of Asia (this is the monsoon, the wind blowing from the south-east) and an anticyclone forms below the Comoros. This still does not prevent the islands from having a few gusts of wind, but their intensity is a lot less than during the hot season.

The two winds that bring the two different seasons are called the Kashkasi (in November) and the Kusi.

== Terrestrial ecology ==
Partly as a result of international pressure during the 1990s, the government of the Union has begun to take greater care of the environment. Measures have been taken not only to preserve the rare fauna, but also to check the destruction of the environment, especially on Anjouan, which is densely populated. More precisely, in order to minimize the felling of trees for fuel, kerosene has been subsidized, and efforts are underway to replace the lost forest cover caused by the distillation of Ylang-ylang for perfume. The Fund for the Support of Community Development, sponsored by the International Development Association (IDA, a subsidiary of the World Bank) and the Comorian government, is applying itself to improving the water supply on the islands.

=== Flora ===
Like most islands, the diversity of the local flora suffers from two pressures, on the one hand the reduction of available space caused by humans settling in what used to be the wildest areas, and the invasion of exotic plant species such as guava trees. Much of the remaining habitat is not protected, and the islands' growing population puts more pressure on the remaining wild lands.

=== Fauna ===
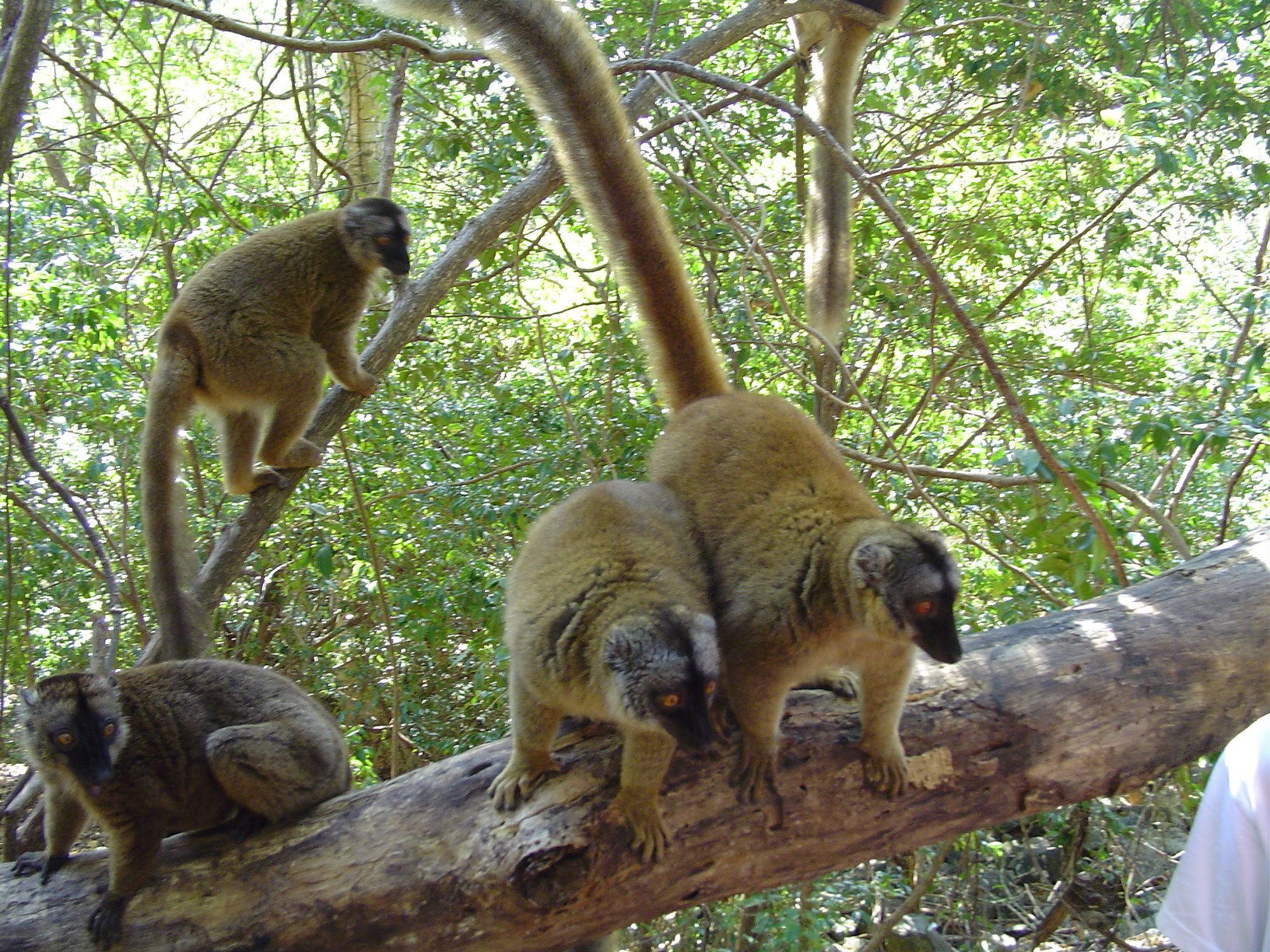
Lemurs

The islands are home to eight species of native terrestrial mammal – three species of fruit bat, three insectivorous bat species, and two lemur species. Two bat species, Livingstone's fruit bat (Pteropus livingstonii) and the Comoro rousette (Rousettus obliviosus), are endemic. Livingstone's fruit bat, discovered by David Livingstone in 1863, was previously abundant, but has now been reduced to a population of about 1,200 specimens restricted to Anjouan and Moheli. A British preservation group sent an expedition to the Comoros in 1992, with the object of transporting some specimens to Great Britain, in order to form a reproducing colony.

Native lemurs include the mongoose lemur (Eulemur mongoz) and the common brown lemur (Eulemur fulvus). The common brown lemur or maki, known as Kima in Shikomori, is present on Mayotte, where it is believed to have been introduced from Madagascar. It is protected by French law and by local tradition.

Mammals introduced to the islands by humans include the Javan mongoose (Urva javanica) and tailless tenrec (Tenrec ecaudatus).

Twenty-two species of birds are endemic to the archipelago. Endemic species include the Karthala scops-owl (Otus pauliani), Anjouan scops-owl (Otus capnodes) and Humblot's flycatcher (Humblotia flavirostris).

Native invertebrates include Scolopendra, venomous centipedes that can reach up to 25 centimetres (10 inches) long.

No large African animals (elephants, giraffes, lions, crocodiles, zebras or antelopes) are found on the Comoros, despite the islands being relatively close to the mainland.

== Freshwater ecology ==
Freshwater habitats on the islands include streams originating in the islands' forested highlands and flowing into the sea, as well as crater lakes. These habitats are home to species of freshwater and brackish water fish, frogs, waterbirds, dragonflies, and caddisflies.

Mayotte and Moheli have perennial streams and lakes. Mayotte is the oldest of the islands, and has many meandering streams which descend from mountain forests, as well as two lakes – Dziani Karehani and Dziani Dzaha. Mohéli also has freshwater streams, and the freshwater but sulfurous lake Dziani Boundouni.

Grande Comore, the largest and youngest island, is volcanically active and has thin and rocky soils, with no perennial streams or large stream valleys. Anjouan also has few permanent freshwater habitats.

All of the freshwater fish on the Comoros are from secondary families, i.e. families of fish which can tolerate salt water. No primary families – fish families adapted to freshwater and intolerant of salt water – are native to the island, on account of the islands' oceanic origin and relatively recent geologic origins.

== Marine ecology ==
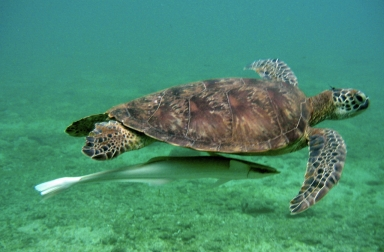
Green sea turtle (Chelonia mydas) at Mohéli

Mayotte, the oldest island, is surrounded by a barrier reef, with extensive reefs and lagoons between the reef and the island. The reef and lagoon cover over 1,000 km^{2} (400 sq. mi.). They are home to more than 760 species of marine fish, including 17 threatened species, 581 species of marine arthropods, more than 450 cnidarian species, and 24 marine mammal species.

The other Comoro islands are surrounded by fringing reefs, which form a narrow platform extending a short distance from the coast. Reefs fringe about 60% of the coast of Grande Comore, 80% of Anjouan's coast, and 100% of Mohéli's coast. The Sima Peninsula on Anjouan is surrounded by a vast reef. The islands also have rocky reefs on basalt substrates.

Mayotte has 7.6 km^{2} (3 sq. mi.) of seagrass beds. The extensive seagrass beds in Moheli Marine Park account for about 90% of the remaining seagrass beds in the Comoros. Other seagrass beds occur at Mitsamiouli, Malé and Ouroveni around Grande Comore and at Bimbini and Ouani around Anjouan. There are eight seagrass species in the Comoros. The islands' seagrass beds have been degraded by sedimentation and climate change. Between 1993 and 1998 the Thalassodendron ciliatum beds at Moheli Marine Park were destroyed by a large sediment influx into the lagoon from upland deforestation coupled with high rainfall.

Mayotte has 8.5 km^{2} (3¼ sq. mi.) of mangroves. There are approximately 120 ha (300 acres) of mangroves on the other Comoro islands, 75% of which are on the south coast of Mohéli, particularly around Damou and Mapiachingo. Smaller areas of mangrove are also found on Grande Comore and Anjouan. There are seven mangrove species in the Comoros, with Rhizophora mucronata and Avicennia marina the most abundant.

Marine mammals in the Comoros' seas include the humpback whale (Megaptera novaeangliae) sperm whale (Physeter macrocephalus), dugong (Dugong dugon) spinner dolphin (Stenella longirostris), pantropical spotted dolphin (Stenella attenuata), Fraser's dolphin (Lagenodelphis hosei), bottlenose dolphin (Tursiops sp.), Risso's dolphin (Grampus griseus), melon-headed whale (Peponocephala electra), short-finned pilot whale (Globicephala macrorhynchus), pygmy killer whale (Feresa attenuata), Blainville's beaked whale (Mesoplodon densirostris), and Longman's beaked whale (Mesoplodon pacificus).

Other marine fauna include the green sea turtle (Chelonia mydas), most abundantly on Mohéli and Mayotte where they still come to lay eggs, and the coelacanth, a deepwater fish known from fossils over 300 million years old.

=== Marine protected areas ===
Four marine national parks were established in 2010 – Coelacanth National Park (92.76 km^{2}; 35¾ sq. mi.) along the south shore of Grande Comore, Mitsamiouli Ndroude National Park (23.14 km^{2}; 9 sq. mi.) along the north shore of Grande Comore, Mohéli National Park (643.62 km^{2}; 248½ sq. mi.) around Mohéli, and Shisiwani National Park (64.97 km^{2}; 25 sq. mi.) around Anjouan's Sima Peninsula.

== Politics ==
The Comoro Archipelago is divided between:

- The Union of the Comoros, a sovereign nation formed by the three islands of Grande Comore, Anjouan and Mohéli.
- Mayotte, an Overseas Department of the French Republic (département d'outre-mer). This island is also claimed by the Union of the Comoros according to Article 1 of its Constitution.

Mayotte became a French Department on 31 March 2011.

The United Nations General Assembly continued to condemn the French presence in Mayotte until 1994. France, however, used its power of veto in the UN to prevent the Security Council from passing a resolution condemning France. The African Union judged the French presence on Mayotte to be illegal.

The Comoros underwent a political crisis that started off in 1997 with the separatism on Anjouan. The political authorities on the island had turned the population of the island against the central government, advocating at first reunification with France, and later a greater autonomy bordering on independence.

Since 2006, the former president of the Union of the Comoros, Ahmed Abdallah Sambi, who is originally from the island of Anjouan, has been in open conflict with the authorities of Anjouan, a conflict which ended in a landing of the National Army of Development in order to re-establish the authority of the Union on the island.

== See also ==
- Music of the Comoro Islands
- Comorian society
