= Banc Vailheu =

Coordinates: 11°51′S 43°4′E

Banc Vailheu is a submerged volcano in the Comoro Islands group. It is located approximately 13 nmi (24 km; 15 mi) west of Grand Comoro and extends for nine miles underwater. Banc Vailheu is a wall Scuba diving location.
