= Comorian society =

Culture and society of the Comoros

Comoran society and culture reflect the influences of Islam and the traditions of East Africa. The former provides the basis for religion and law; the East African influence is evident in the language, a Swahili dialect, and in a number of pre-Islamic customs. Western, primarily French, influences are also prevalent, particularly in the modern educational sector, the civil service, and cultural affairs.

== Language ==
The Comoran people are a blend of Bantu, Arab, and Malayo-Indonesian elements. A few small communities, primarily in Mahoré, speak Kibushi, a Malagasy dialect. The principal Comoran Swahili dialect, written in Arabic script, is related to the Swahili spoken in East Africa but is not easily intelligible to East African Swahili speakers. Classical Arabic is significant for religious reasons, and French remains the principal language with which the Republic of the Comoros communicates with the rest of the world.

== Early settlements ==
A number of ethnically distinguishable groups are found: the Arabs, descendants of Shirazi settlers, who arrived in significant numbers in the fifteenth century; the Cafres, an African group that settled on the islands before the coming of the Shirazi; a second African group, the Makoa, descendants of slaves brought by the Arabs from the East African coast; and three groups of Malayo-Indonesian peoples—the Oimatsaha, the Antalotes, and the Sakalava, the latter having settled largely on Mahoré. Intermarriage has tended to blur the distinctions among these groups, however. Creoles, descendants of French settlers who intermarried with the indigenous peoples, form a tiny but politically influential group on Mahoré, numbering no more than about 100 on that island. They are predominantly Roman Catholic and mainly cultivate small plantations. In addition, a small group of people descended in part from the Portuguese sailors who landed on the Comoro Islands at the beginning of the sixteenth century are reportedly living around the town of Tsangadjou on the east coast of Njazidja.

== Royal clans ==
Shirazi Arab royal clans dominated the islands socially, culturally, and politically from the fifteenth century until the French occupation. Eleven such clans lived on Njazidja, where their power was strongest, and their leaders, the sultans or sharifs, who claimed to be descendants of Muhammad, were in a continual state of war until the French occupation. Two similar clans were located on Nzwani, and these clans maintained vassals on Mahoré and Mwali after the Sakalava wiped out the local nobles in the late eighteenth and early nineteenth centuries . Although the clan system was weakened by the economic and social dislocations of the colonial era, the descendants of clan nobles continue to form a major portion of the educated and propertied classes. The pre-independence rivalry of Said Mohamed Cheikh and Prince Said Ibrahim, leaders, respectively, of the conservative Parti Vert and the Parti Blanc, was interpreted by some as a revival of old clan antagonisms. Yet many descendants of nobles live in poverty and apparently have less influence socially and politically on Nzwani than on Njazidja.

The present-day elite, although composed in part of those of noble ancestry who took advantage of the opportunities of the cash crop economy established by the French, is mainly defined in terms of wealth rather than caste or descent. This focus on wealth is not unusual, considering that the original Shirazi settlers themselves were traders and that the precolonial sultans were actively involved in commerce. Conspicuous consumption continues to mark the lifestyle of the elite.

== Present day ==
Especially well regarded are those individuals who hold the grand marriage, often after a lifetime of scrimping and saving. This wedding ceremony, which can cost as much as the equivalent of US$20,000 to US$30,000, involves an exchange of expensive gifts between the couple's families and feasts for an entire village. Although the gift giving and dancing that accompany the grand marriage have helped perpetuate indigenous arts in silversmithing, goldsmithing, folk song, and folk dance, the waste involved has disastrous consequences for an economy already short on domestic resources. A ban or curb on the grand marriage was on the agenda of many reformers in the period preceding the radical regime of Ali Soilih, who himself had taken the almost unheard-of step of declining to participate in the ritual. However, the efforts of the Soilih government to restrict the custom aroused great resentment, and it was restored to its preeminent place in Comoran society almost immediately after Soilih was deposed in 1978. Although its expense limits the number of families that can provide their sons and daughters a grand marriage, the ritual is still used as a means of distinguishing Comoran society's future leaders. Only by participating in the ceremony is a Comoran man entitled to participate in his village's assembly of notables and to wear the mharuma, a sash that entitles him to enter the mosque by a special door. Few, if any, candidates win election to the National Assembly without a grand marriage in their pasts. For these reasons in particular, critics of traditional Comoran society condemn the grand marriage as a means of excluding people of modest resources from participating in the islands' political life.

Those who can afford the pilgrimage to Mecca are also accorded prestige. The imams who lead prayers in mosques form a distinct elite group.

Despite the weakening of the position of the Shirazi elite, one observer reports that in many subtle ways old distinctions persist. The descendants of slaves, formally emancipated in 1904, are mostly sharecroppers or squatters, working the land that belonged to their ancestors' former owners, although some have gone abroad as migrant laborers (a greatly restricted option since Madagascar's expulsion of thousands of Comorans in the late 1970s). Men of "freeborn" families choose "freeborn" wives, holding, if possible, a grand marriage; but if they take second wives, these women often are of slave ancestry.

== See also ==
- Comoro Islands
- History of Comoros (1978-1989)
