= Glorioso Islands Marine Natural Park =

Coordinates: 11°37′S 47°13′E

- French: Parc naturel marin des Glorieuses
- IUCN category V (protected landscape/seascape)
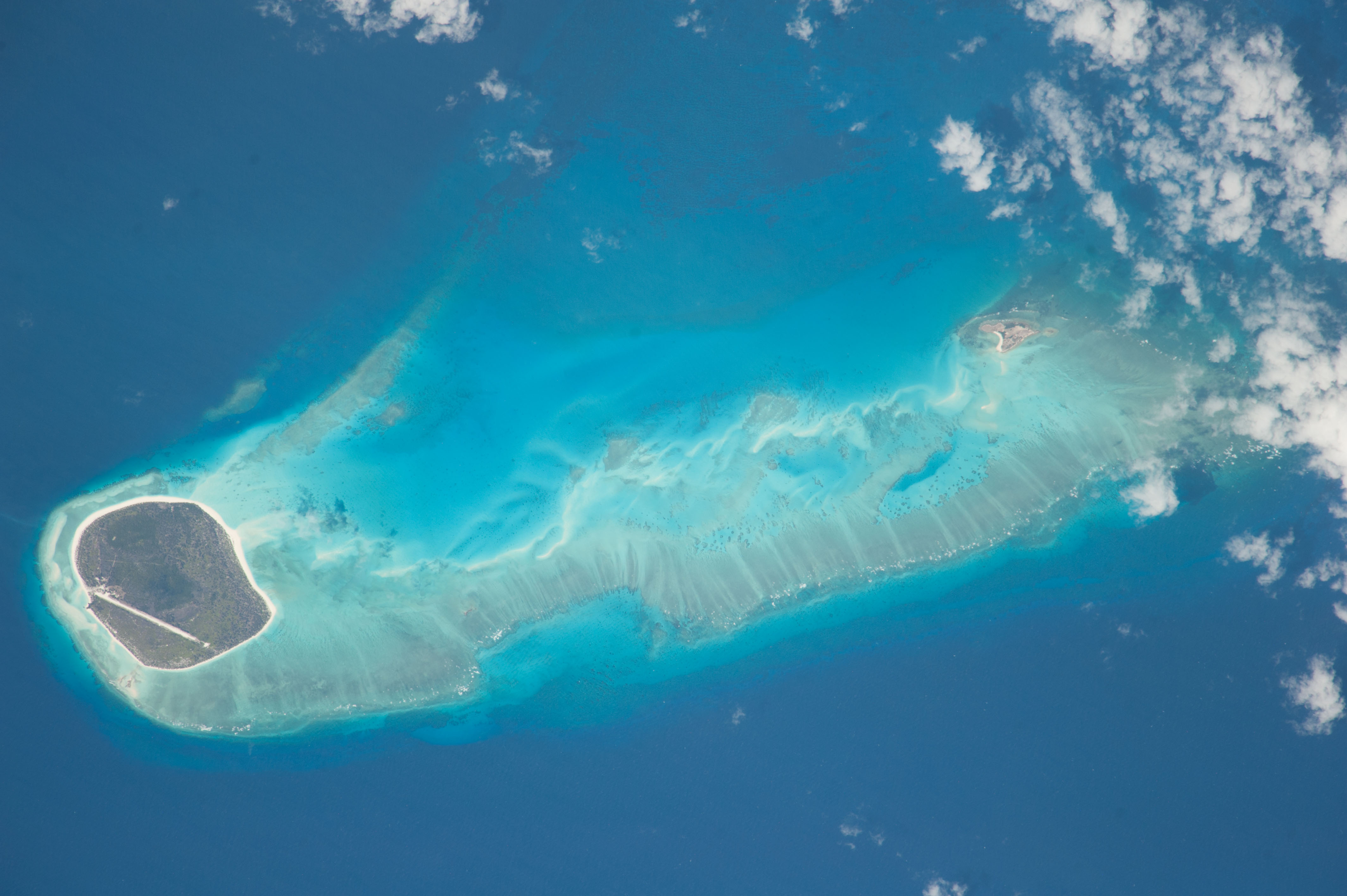
- Glorioso Islands from the International Space Station

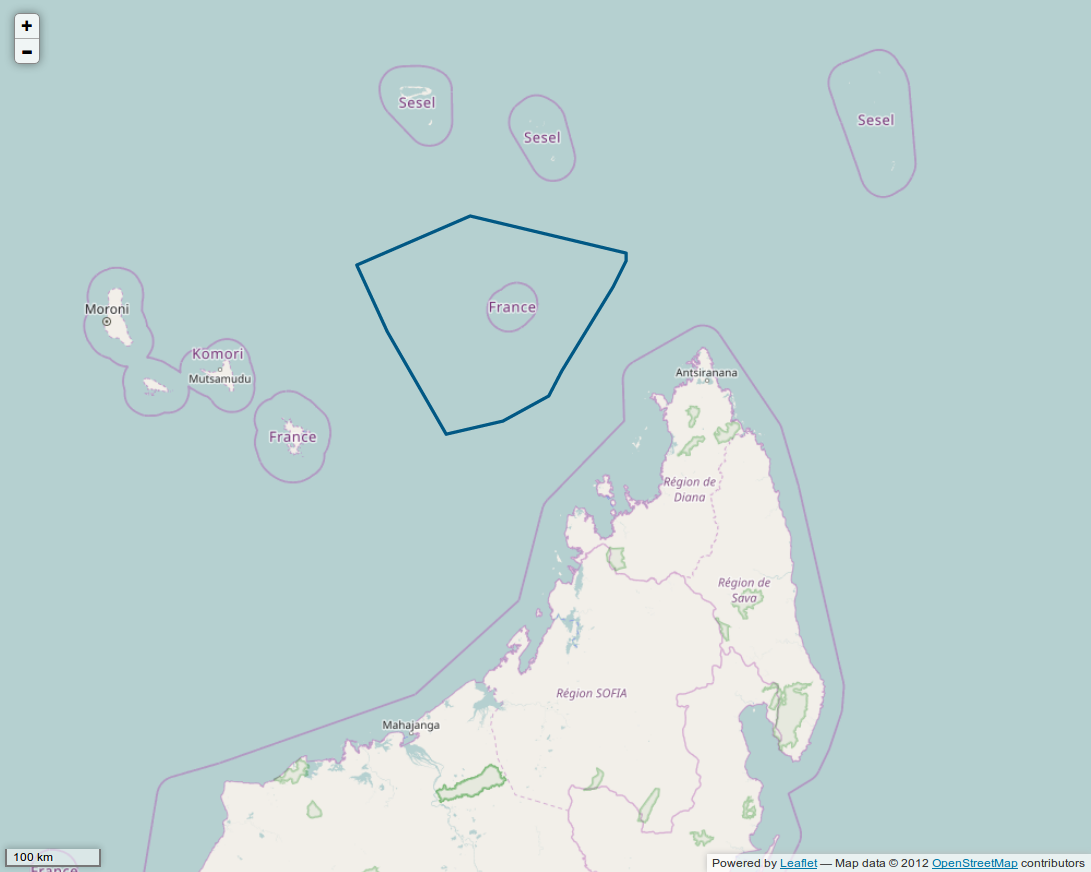
- Borders of the Glorioso Islands territory, part of the Scattered Islands in the Indian Ocean
- Location: French Southern and Antarctic Lands
- Area: 43,502.24 km^{2} (16,796.31 sq mi)
- Established: 2012
- Disestablished: 2021 (Replaced by the Glorioso Islands National Nature Reserve)

The Glorioso Islands Marine Natural Park (French: Parc naturel marin des Glorieuses) was a marine park at the entrance of the Mozambique Channel, around the Glorioso Islands, in the Indian Ocean. It extends for more than 43,000 square kilometres (17,000 sq mi) until the edge of the French overseas territory's exclusive economic zone. Established in 2012, it is the fourth marine natural park created by France and the second in the Indian Ocean after Mayotte Marine Natural Park, which it abuts. In 2021, it was replaced by the Glorioso Islands National Nature Reserve (French: Réserve naturelle nationale de l'archipel des Glorieuses).

== Geography ==
Glorioso Islands Marine Natural Park lies between Mayotte, the Seychelles, Madagascar, and the Comoros, with the territory being part of the Scattered Islands.

The northern Mozambique channel, which the park lies within, is considered a hotspot for marine diversity. The park is over 43,000 square kilometres (17,000 sq mi), covering the entirety of the Glorioso Islands EEZ. It is contiguous with Mayotte Marine Natural Park, together forming a park stretching 110,000 square kilometres (42,000 sq mi).

== History ==
The territory of the Glorioso Islands has seen a number of problems due to illegal activities such as fishing and tourism. To keep an eye on these activities, while protecting the entire exclusive economic zone, the French Southern and Antarctic Lands and the French Marine Protected Areas Agency decided to develop a framework for managing the area.

Glorioso Islands Marine Natural Park was established through TAAF ordinance number 2012–245 on February 22, 2012, and the park entered operation in early 2015. It is the fourth marine natural park established by France, and the second in the Indian Ocean following that of Mayotte.

== Marine biodiversity ==
The park is home to a reef that is 17 kilometres (11 mi) long and 165 square kilometres (64 sq mi) in area. Due to its isolation, the archipelago is relatively well preserved and contains a wealth of marine biodiversity, so it is a useful reference for scientific research and observation of the marine environment, as well as for monitoring climate change.

While the uninhabited nature of the islands can make it difficult to establish scientific missions there, 1435 species have been identified around the Glorioso Islands, and 600 have been identified around the Banc du Geyser. These include more than 150 species of cnidarians and 349 species of coral reef fish.

The park also serves as a refuge area for a large number of endangered species including various sea turtles, marine mammals, rays, sharks, and sea birds. Around 11% of the species present within the park are listed in the appendices of international conventions on environmental conservation or appear on the International Union for Conservation of Nature's Red List of Threatened Species. Humpback whales breed within its waters, and the wider region has seen 23 whale species. The waters are an important location for Green sea turtles.

Illegal fishing is suspected to have caused a decline in sea cucumber populations in the less patrolled areas of the park. Wildlife around the Banc du Geyser may also have been damaged by typhoons.

== Objectives ==
The park has four major officially mandated objectives: protection of natural heritage, sustainable fishing, scientific observation, and ecotourism.

=== Natural heritage ===
Due to the isolated and uninhabited nature of the park, it has exceptional natural heritage. The preservation of this heritage is thus one of the most important challenges for the park. In particular, the park aims to protect and study turtles (there are a large number of juvenile turtle habitats in the park), coral reefs (including through research on coral bleaching), seagrass (five species of spermatophytes have been confirmed there), and marine mammals, using non-invasive research techniques.

=== Sustainable fishing ===
Fishing is the main activity conducted within the park, but authorities aim to promote sustainable fishing, particularly when it comes to fishing on reef banks such as the Geyser and Cordelière reefs. Because the park is within the exclusive economic zone, fishing is technically prohibited within those waters, so the park works to monitor such activities. Fishing is prohibited within the 12 nm territorial waters of the Glorioso islands, and within 10 nm of Banc du Geyser.

=== Scientific observation ===
The territory of the Glorioso Islands Marine Natural Park is considered a privileged scientific observatory due to its isolation. Thus, one of the park's aims is to improve scientific knowledge of the Mozambique Channel's marine biodiversity through scientific research, including water quality studies.

=== Ecotourism ===
Access to the park and tourist activity are strictly regulated, so this aspect of the park's mandate aims to develop ecotourism and ensure that any tourism is sustainable and respectful of the marine environment.

== Governance ==
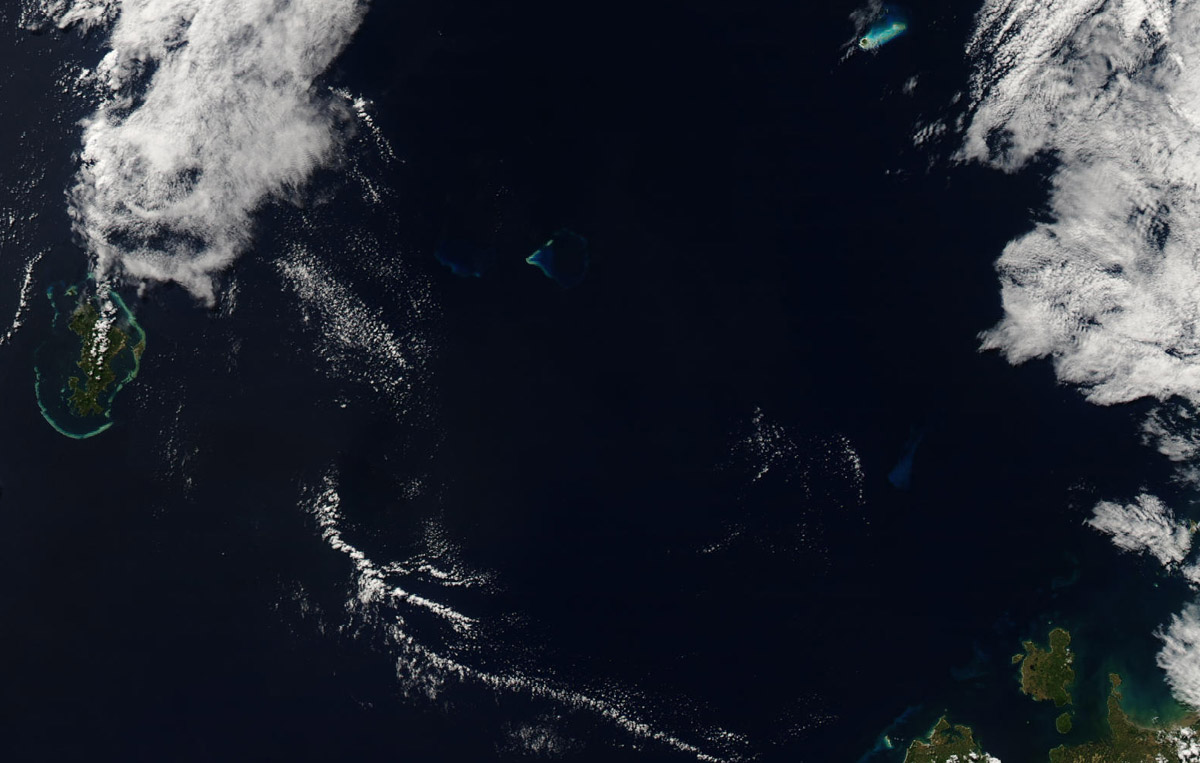
The Glorioso Islands Marine Natural Park covers the waters surrounding Banc du Geyser (middle) and the Glorioso Islands (top right). Mayotte (left) has its own marine natural park.

The park is governed by a management board consisting of 20 appointed members: five representatives of the French state, seven qualified experts, three representatives of environmental protection organizations, four representatives of professional organizations, and the president of the board of Mayotte Marine Natural Park. The board is currently led by Bernard Cressens. The administration has agreed with Mayotte to some joint management actions.
