= France–Seychelles Maritime Boundary Agreement =

Agreement between the Government of the French Republic and the Government of the Republic of Seychelles concerning Delimitation of the Maritime Boundary of the Exclusive Economic Zone and the Continental Shelf of France and of Seychelles
- Type: Maritime delimitation
- Signed: 19 February 2001
- Location: Victoria, Seychelles
- Effective: 19 February 2001
- Parties: France; Seychelles
- Depositary: United Nations Secretariat
- Language: French

The France–Seychelles Maritime Boundary Agreement is a 2001 treaty between France and Seychelles which delimits the maritime boundary between Seychelles and the uninhabited Glorioso Islands, which is a French possession.

The treaty was signed in Victoria, Seychelles on 19 February 2001. The boundary set out by the text of the treaty identifies two straight-line maritime segments defined by three individual coordinate points. The boundary is an approximately equidistant line between the two territories. The north end of the boundary stops short of the tripoint with the Comoros and the south end stops short of the tripoint with Madagascar.

The treaty came into force immediately upon signature. The full name of the treaty is Agreement between the Government of the French Republic and the Government of the Republic of Seychelles concerning Delimitation of the Maritime Boundary of the Exclusive Economic Zone and the Continental Shelf of France and of Seychelles. Foreign Minister Jérémie Bonnelame signed the treaty on behalf of Seychelles.
