= Coelacanth National Park =

National park off the coast of the Comoros

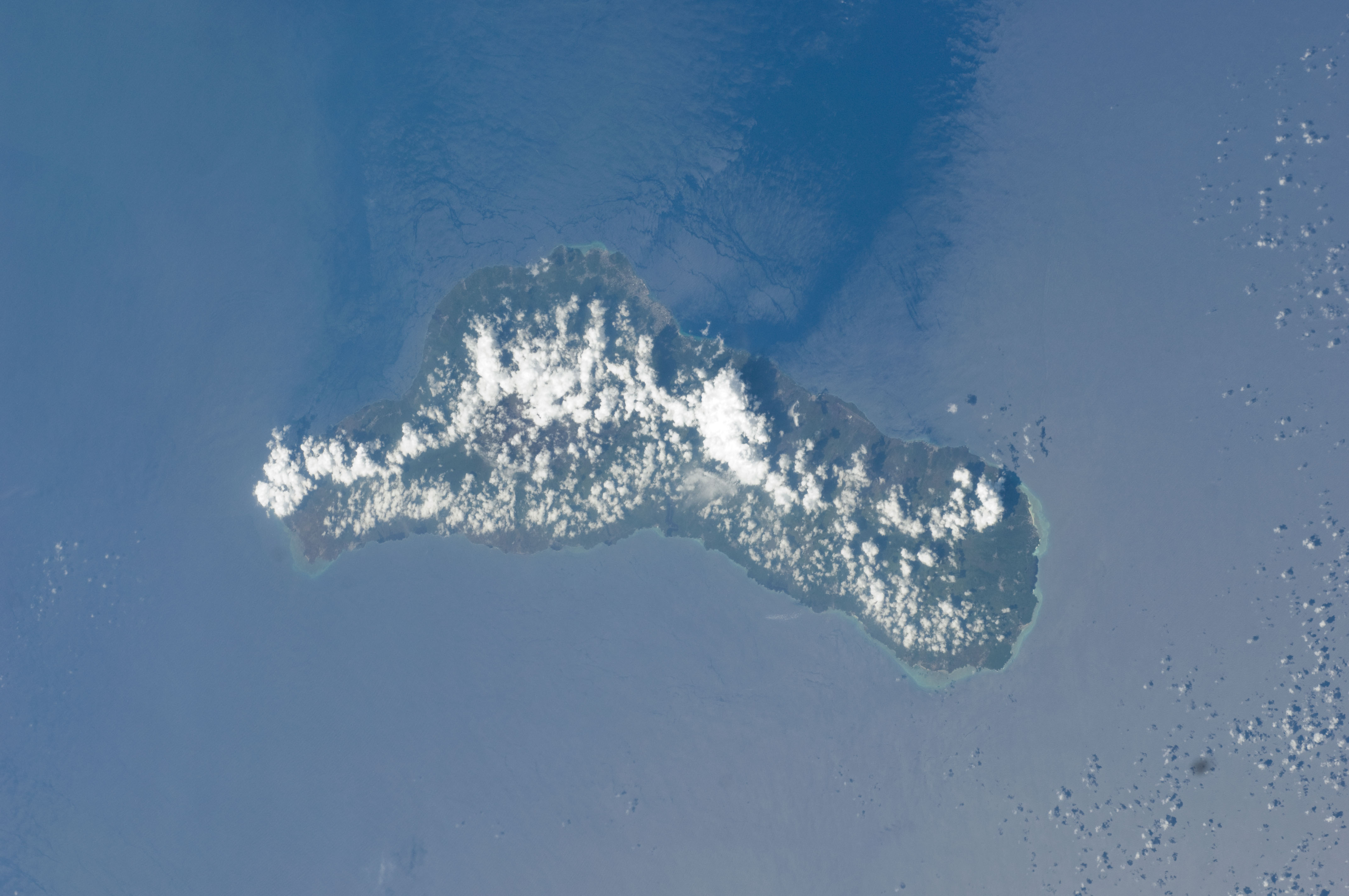
- Grande Comore Island
- Interactive map of Coelacanth National Park
- Location: Grande Comore, Comoros
- Area: 9,276 ha (35.81 sq mi)
- Designation: 2010 National Park
- Operator: The Comoros National Parks Agency

Coelacanth National Park (French: Parc National Coelacanth) is a national park off the main island of the Comoros. The park is made up a seascape home to coelacanths and a coral reef which attracts whales and dolphins. Its creation was announced in 2016 as part of a government effort to protect 25% of the Comoros by 2021.

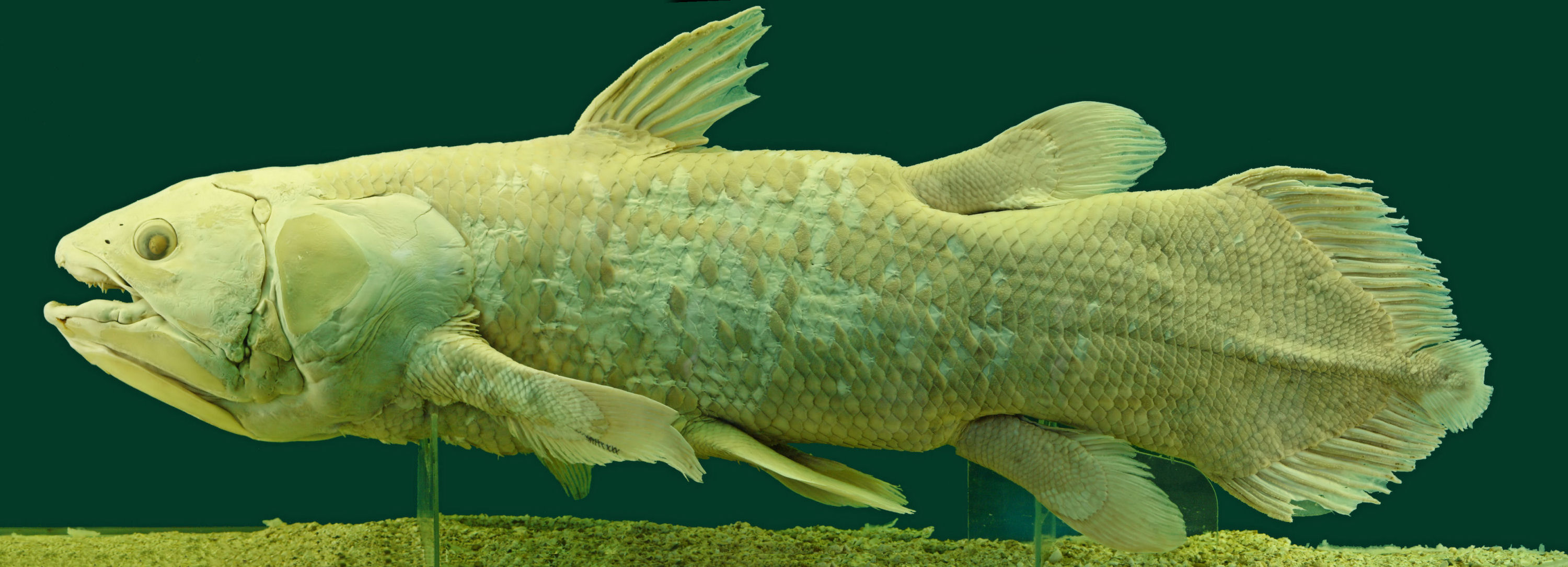
Preserved specimen of Latimeria chalumnae in the Natural History Museum, Vienna, Austria [length: 170 cm (67 in) - weight: 60 kg (130 lb)]. This specimen was caught on 18 October 1974, next to Salimani/Selimani (Grand Comoro, Comoro Islands) 11°48′40.7″S 43°16′3.3″E.
