= Île du Lys =

One of the Glorioso Islands north-west of Madagascar

Coordinates: 11°31′03″S 047°22′23″E

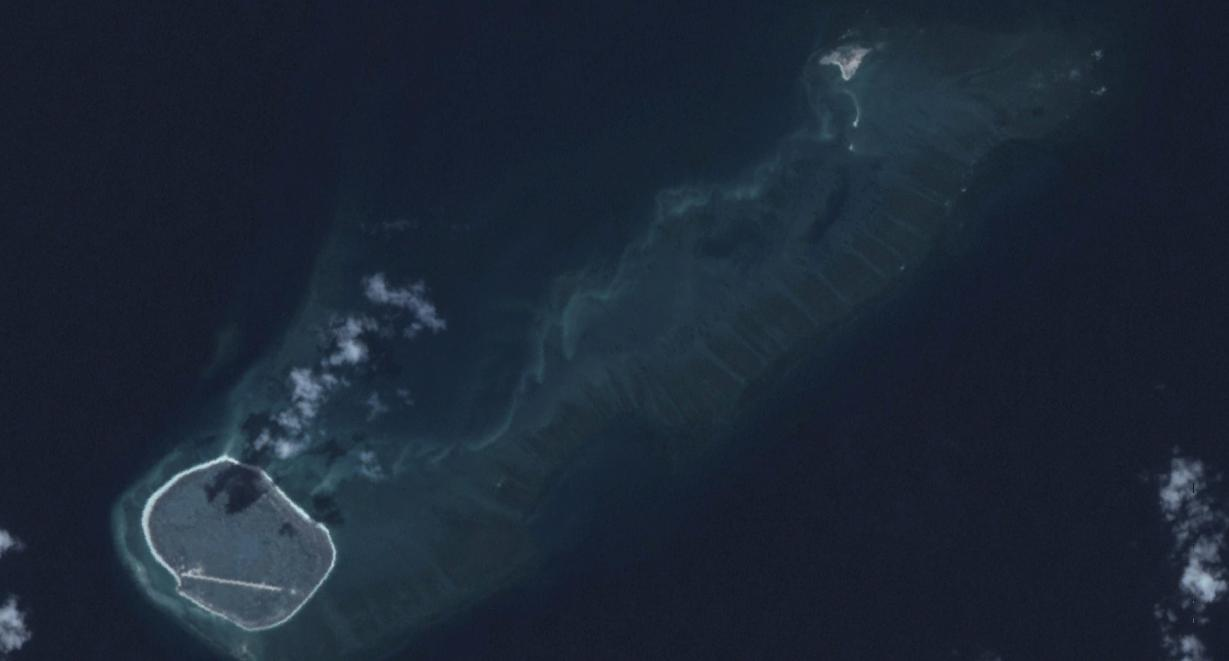
Satellite image of the Glorioso Islands, with Île du Lys at the top right

Île du Lys (French pronunciation: [il dy lis]), also known as Le Lys or Ile du Lise, is one of the Glorioso Islands, north-west of Madagascar. It is administered by France.

== Description ==
The island has a prominent sand hill and a saltwater lagoon. Trees on the island can grow up to 10 metres (33 ft) in height.

=== Important Bird Area ===
The island has been identified as an Important Bird Area (IBA) by BirdLife International because it supports a very large colony of about 100,000 pairs of sooty terns, as well as 100 pairs of brown noddies. There are no resident landbirds.
