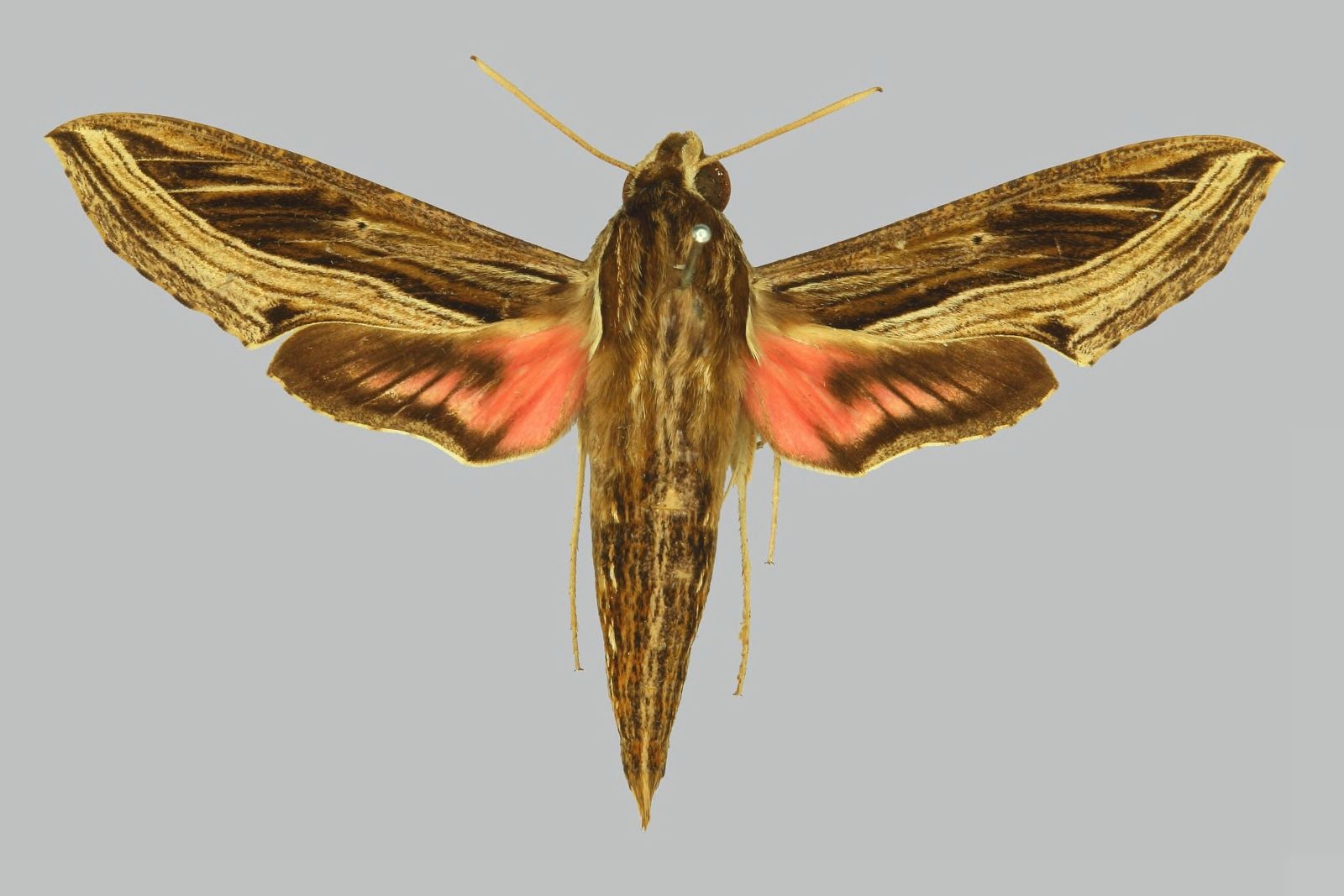
- Male

Scientific classification
- Kingdom: Animalia
- Phylum: Arthropoda
- Class: Insecta
- Order: Lepidoptera
- Family: Sphingidae
- Genus: Hippotion
- Species: H. aporodes

Binomial name
- Hippotion aporodes Rothschild & Jordan, 1910

Synonyms
- Hippotion horus Röber, 1921; Hippotion aporodes nigrofasciata Aurivillius, 1925

= Hippotion aporodes =

Species of moth

Hippotion aporodes is a moth of the family Sphingidae. It is known from forests from Ivory Coast to the Congo Basin and Uganda.
