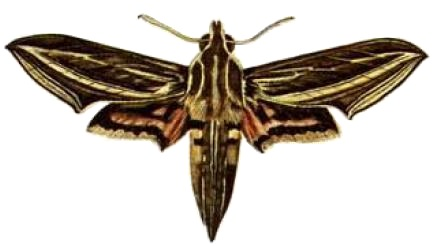

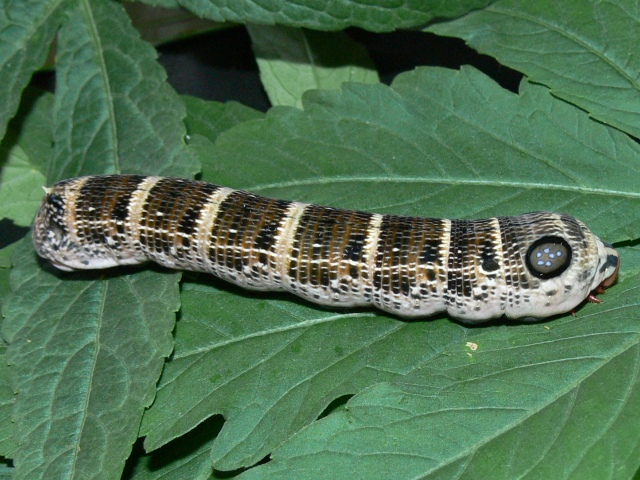
- imago and caterpillar

Scientific classification
- Kingdom: Animalia
- Phylum: Arthropoda
- Class: Insecta
- Order: Lepidoptera
- Family: Sphingidae
- Genus: Hippotion
- Species: H. osiris

Binomial name
- Hippotion osiris (Dalman, 1823)

Synonyms
- Sphinx osiris Dalman, 1823

= Hippotion osiris =

Species of moth

Hippotion osiris is a moth of the family Sphingidae. It is common throughout most of the Ethiopian Region, including Madagascar and the Seychelles. Occasional vagrants have been recorded from Spain. It is uncommon on the East African coast. This species is an occasional migrant.
