= Glorioso Islands =

Archipelago in the Scattered Islands in the Indian Ocean

Glorioso Islands Îles Glorieuses (French)
- Flag of the French Southern and Antarctic Lands Coat of arms
- Motto: "Liberté, égalité, fraternité" (French) (English: "Liberty, equality, fraternity")
- Anthem: La Marseillaise ("The Marseillaise")
- Status: District of French Southern and Antarctic Lands

Glorioso Islands
Disputed island
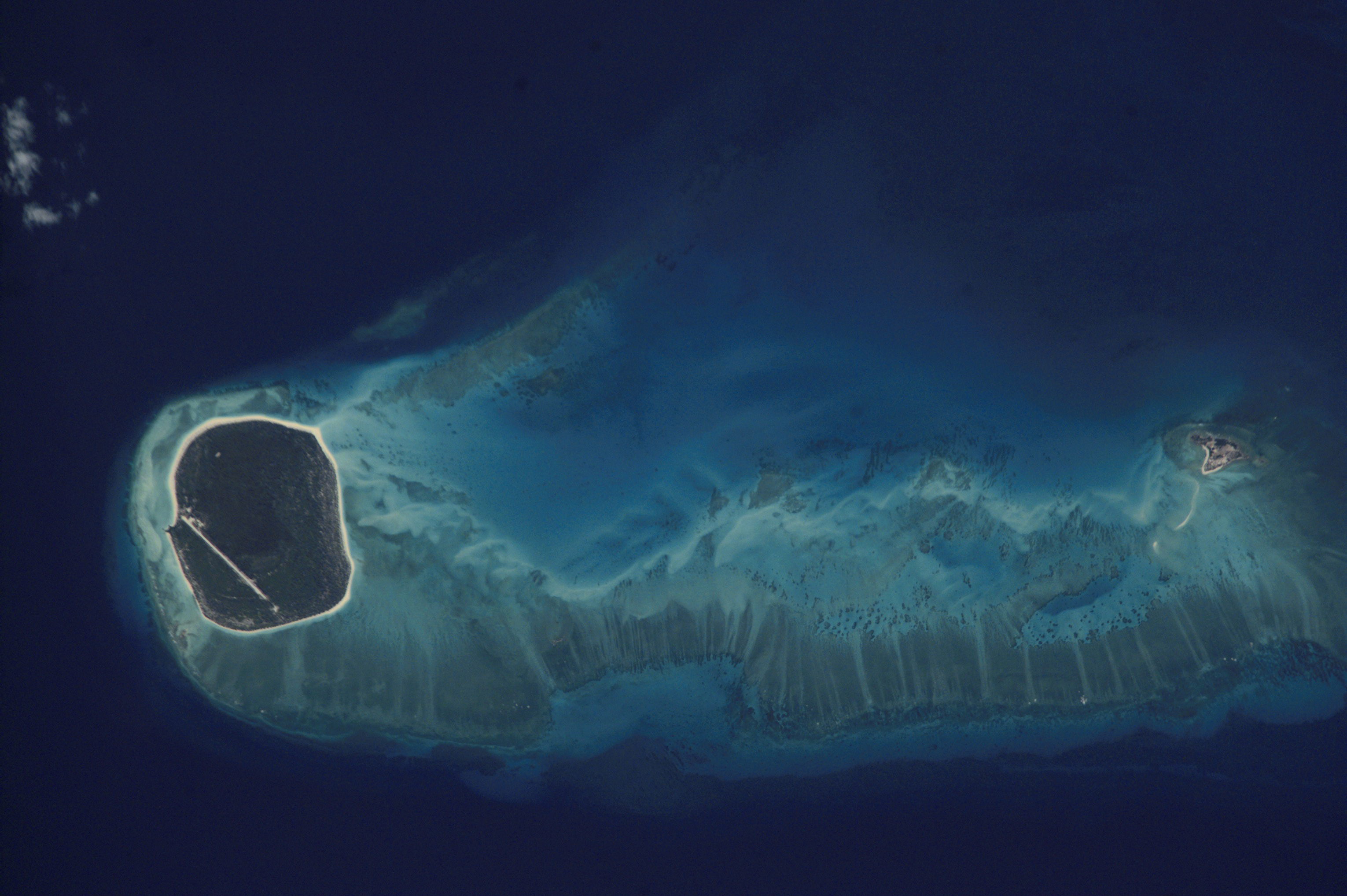
- The Glorioso Islands seen from the ISS, 2001. Grande Glorieuse (left) and Île du Lys (right)

- Map of the Scattered Islands in the Indian Ocean

Geography
- Location: Mozambique Channel
- Coordinates: 11°33′S 47°20′E

Administration
- France
- Overseas territory: French Southern and Antarctic Lands
- District: Scattered Islands in the Indian Ocean

Claimed by
- Comoros
- Madagascar

The Glorieuses or Glorioso Islands (French: Îles Glorieuses or officially also Archipel des Glorieuses) are a group of islands and rocks totaling 5 square kilometres (1.9 sq mi). They are controlled by France as part of the Scattered Islands in the Indian Ocean in the French Southern and Antarctic Lands, a French overseas territory, but are also claimed by Comoros, Madagascar and formerly by Seychelles. They are geographically part of the Comoro Islands between the French overseas region of Mayotte and the nation of Madagascar.

== Archipelago ==
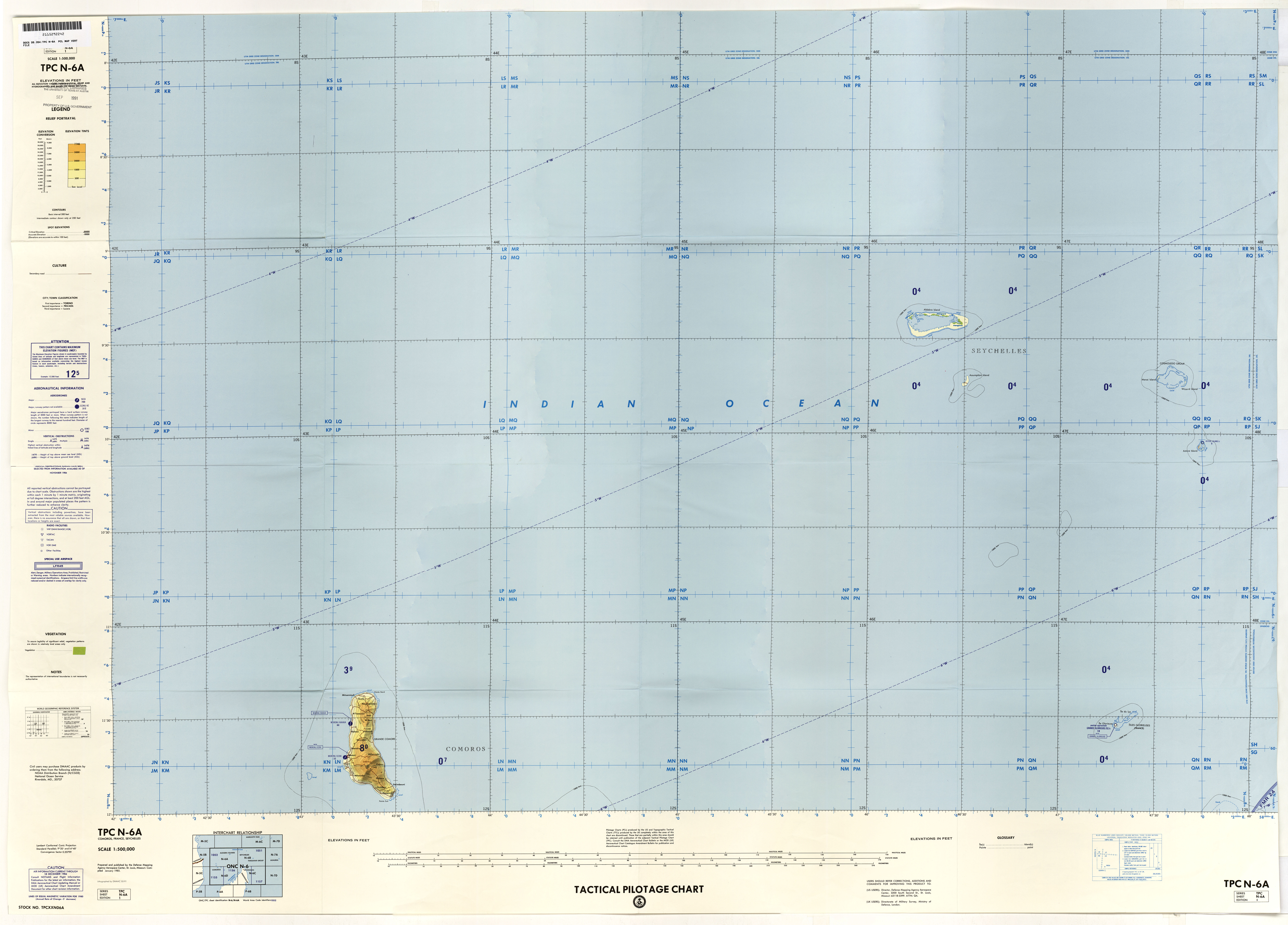
Map including the Îles Glorieuses (DMA, 1985)

The archipelago consists of two islands, Grande Glorieuse (11°34′46.54″S 47°17′54.14″E) and Île du Lys, and two rock islands, Roches Vertes and Île aux Crabes, along with two sandbanks that emerge at low tide. They form part of a coral reef and lagoon. Grande Glorieuses is roughly circular in shape and measures about 3 kilometres (1.9 mi) in diameter. It is verdant, mostly by the coconut plantation remains and casuarina trees.

Île du Lys, located at 11°30′59.35″S 47°22′36.02″E about 8 kilometres (5.0 mi) northeast of Grande Glorieuses, is about 600 metres (2,000 ft) long and consists of sand dunes and scrub with some mangroves. It was formerly quarried for phosphate (guano).

The Glorieuses have an Exclusive Economic Zone (EEZ) of 48,350 square kilometres (18,670 sq mi). There are anchorages offshore, and Grande Glorieuse has a 1,300-metre (4,300 ft) long airstrip.

== Climate ==
The climate is tropical and the terrain is low and flat, varying in height from sea level to 12 metres (39 ft). Île de Lys in particular is a nesting ground for migratory seabirds, and turtles lay eggs on the beaches. In the ocean, migratory species such as humpback whales and whale sharks may appear.

== History ==
While probably earlier known to Arab (perhaps especially Yemeni) navigators, the Glorieuses were named and settled in 1880 by a Frenchman, Hippolyte Caltaux, who established a coconut plantation on Grande Glorieuse. The archipelago became a French possession in 1892 when Captain Richard of the Primauget made a formal claim. In 1895, the Glorioso Island became a part of the colony of Mayotte and dependencies.

Historically flora on the islands mostly consisted of bois de rose, portia, banyan and other large native trees, many of which were felled following the establishment of the French settlement and plantation.

From 1914 to 1958, concessions to exploit the islands were given to Seychelles companies. The islands are today nature reserves with a meteorological station garrisoned by the French Foreign Legion. Despite the Glorioso Islands never having been a part of the Malagasy Protectorate but a part of the colony of Mayotte and dependencies, then a part of French Comoros, Madagascar has claimed sovereignty over the islands since 1972. The Comoros claims Mayotte and Glorioso Islands. The Seychelles claimed the islands too before the France–Seychelles Maritime Boundary Agreement in 2001.

In 2012, France founded Glorioso Islands Marine Natural Park, a marine protected area, to preserve the endangered flora and fauna of the islands.

The Scattered Islands in the Indian Ocean are partially claimed by the Comoros, Madagascar, and Mauritius. The Malagasy and Mauritian claims, however, are significantly later than their access to independence. However, the agreement reached in October 2024 on the restitution to Mauritius of the Chagos Islands by Great Britain, in the heart of the Indian Ocean, notably home to the American base of Diego Garcia, has relaunched the debate in Madagascar.

== Gallery ==
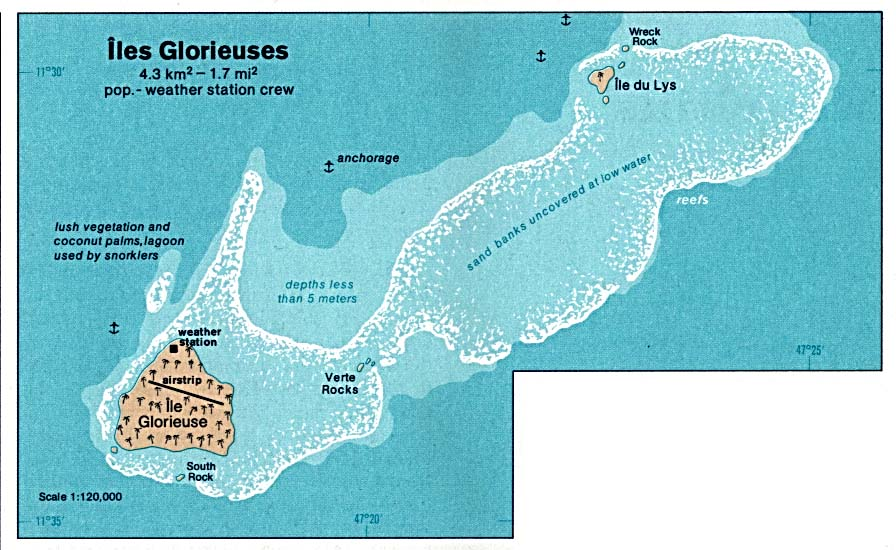
Map

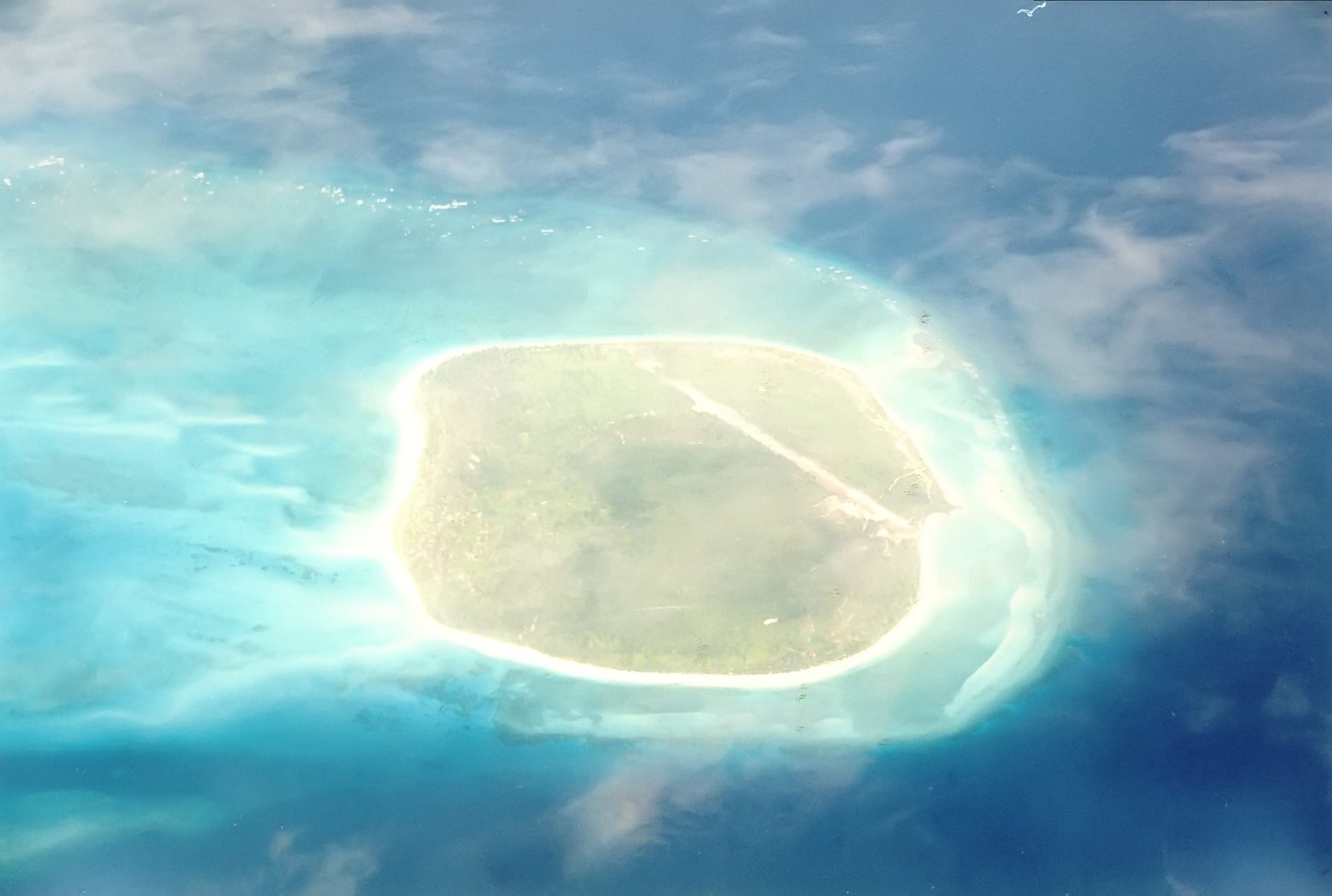
Island overview

== See also ==
- France–Seychelles Maritime Boundary Agreement
- Moheli Marine Park
- Glorioso Islands Marine Natural Park
