= Overseas France =

Territories under French sovereignty

Overseas France France d'outre-mer (French)
- Flag of France
- Motto: "Liberté, égalité, fraternité" "Liberty, Equality, Fraternity"
- Anthem: La Marseillaise ("The Marseillaise")
- Territory of the French Republic (red); Overseas territories (circled); Claimed territory (Adélie Land; hatched)

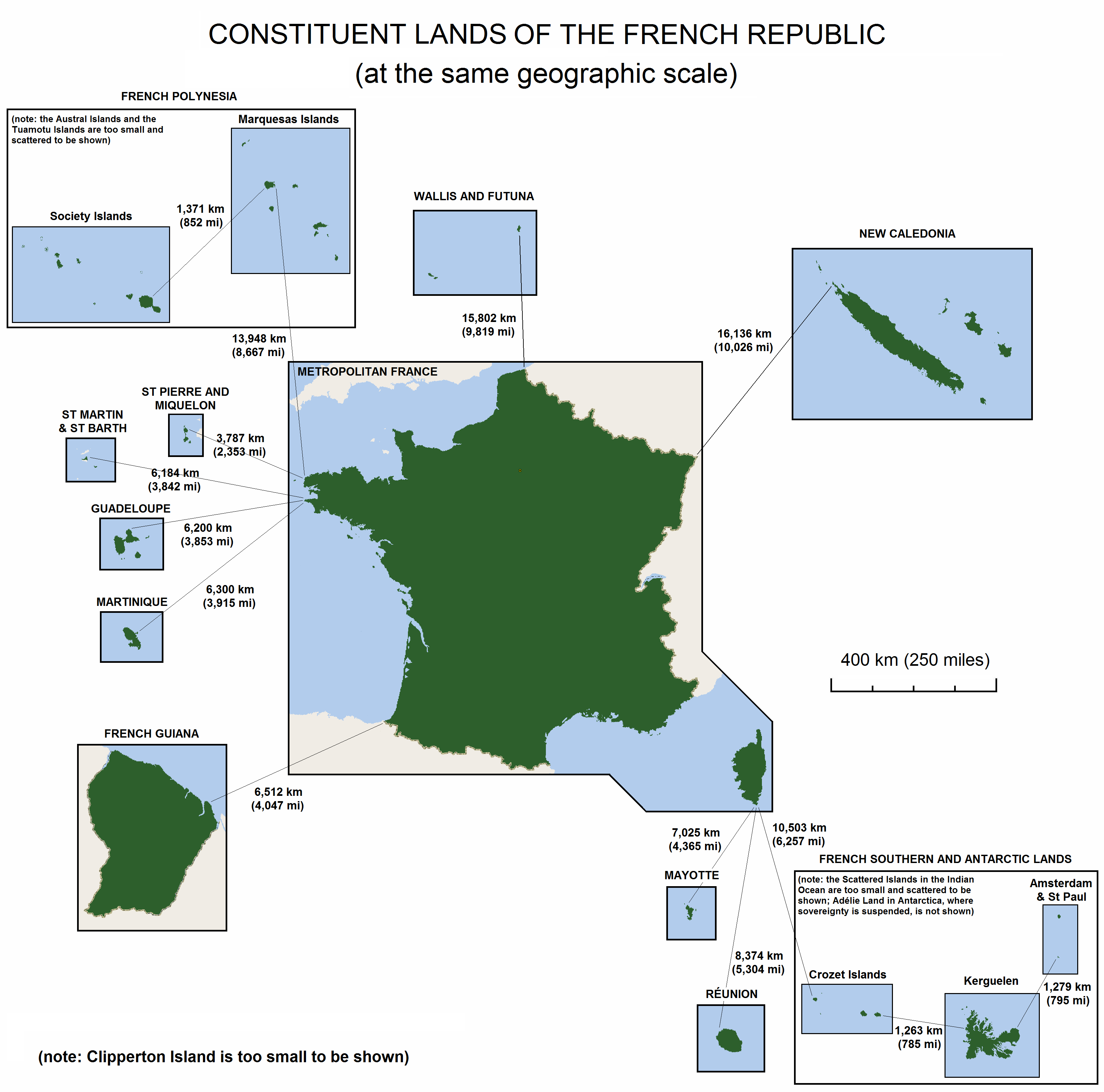
- Capital: Paris
- Largest settlements: Fort-de-France (Martinique), Pointe-à-Pitre (Guadeloupe), Saint Denis (La Réunion), Saint Pierre (La Réunion), Nouméa (New Caledonia), Cayenne (French Guiana), Mamoudzou (Mayotte), Papeete/Faʼaʼā (French Polynesia)
- Languages: French Regional languages: Antillean Creole (Guadeloupe and Martinique); Guianan Creole (French Guiana); Reunionese Creole (La Réunion); Shimaore (Mayotte); Tahitian, Marquesan (French Polynesia); Wallisian, Futunan (Wallis and Futuna); Drehu, Nengone, Paicî, Ajië, Javanese, and other native New Caledonian languages (New Caledonia)
- Demonym: French
- Territories: 5 departments/regions 8 collectivities/territories: Guadeloupe; Martinique; French Guiana; Réunion; Mayotte; Saint Martin; Saint Barthélemy; Saint Pierre and Miquelon; New Caledonia; Wallis and Futuna; French Polynesia; Clipperton; French Southern and Antarctic Lands

Leaders
  - President: Emmanuel Macron
  - Minister: Naïma Moutchou

Area
  - Total: 120,396 (Note: Excluding Adélie Land.) km^{2} (46,485 sq mi)

Population
  - Estimate: 2,891,000 (Jan. 2026)
- Currency: Euro; CFP Franc
- Date format: dd/mm/yyyy (AD)

Overseas France (French: France d'outre-mer, also France ultramarine) (Note: Also les Outre-mer, les outre-mers, or, colloquially, les DOM-TOM (départements d'outre-mer et territoires d'outre-mer) or les DROM-COM (départements et régions d'outre-mer et collectivités d'outre-mer).) consists of 13 French territories outside Europe, mostly the remnants of the French colonial empire that remained a part of the French state under various statuses after decolonisation.

"Overseas France" is a collective name; while used in everyday life in France, it is not an administrative designation in its own right. Instead, the five overseas regions have exactly the same administrative status as the thirteen metropolitan regions; the five overseas collectivities are semi-autonomous; and New Caledonia is an autonomous territory. Overseas France includes island territories in the Atlantic, Pacific and Indian oceans, French Guiana on the South American continent, and several peri-Antarctic islands as well as a claim in Antarctica. Excluding the district of Adélie Land, where French sovereignty is effective de jure by French law, but where the French exclusive claim on this part of Antarctica is frozen by the Antarctic Treaty (signed in 1959), overseas France covers a land area of 120,396 km^{2} (46,485 sq mi) and accounts for 18.0% of the French Republic's land territory. Its exclusive economic zone (EEZ) of 9,825,538 km^{2} (3,793,661 sq mi) accounts for 96.7% of the EEZ of the French Republic.

Outside Europe, four broad classes of overseas French territorial administration currently exist: overseas departments/regions, overseas collectivities, the sui generis territory of New Caledonia, and uninhabited territories. From a legal and administrative standpoint, these four classes have varying legal status and levels of autonomy, although all permanently inhabited territories have representation in both France's National Assembly and Senate, which together make up the French Parliament. Six of these regions are considered Outermost Regions of the European Union, with the rest, excepting Clipperton, considered overseas countries and territories that cooperate with the European Union.

2,891,000 people lived in overseas France in January 2026. Most of these residents are citizens of France and citizens of the European Union. This makes them able to vote in French and European elections.

== Varying constitutional statuses ==
=== Overseas departments and regions ===
Historical population
Year	Pop.	±% p.a.
1950	847,000	—
1960	1,103,000	+2.68%
1970	1,388,000	+2.32%
1980	1,582,000	+1.32%
1990	1,921,000	+1.96%
2000	2,295,000	+1.79%
2010	2,622,000	+1.34%
2020	2,782,000	+0.59%
2026	2,891,000	+0.64%
January 2026: Total population of all overseas departments and collectivities: 2,891,000. Total population of five overseas departments: 2,289,000. Total population of five overseas collectivities and New Caledonia: 602,000. Sources: French Polynesia, New Caledonia, Saint Barthélemy, Saint Martin, Saint Pierre and Miquelon, Wallis et Futuna

Overseas regions have exactly the same status as France's mainland regions. The French Constitution provides that, in general, French laws and regulations (France's civil code, penal code, administrative law, social laws, tax laws, etc.) apply to French overseas regions just as in metropolitan France, but can be adapted as needed to suit the region's particular needs. Hence, the local administrations of French overseas regions cannot themselves pass new laws.

- French Guiana (since 1946)
- Guadeloupe (since 1946)
- Martinique (since 1946)
- Mayotte (since 2011)
  - 1976–2003: sui generis overseas territory
    - 2001–2003: with the designation departmental community
  - 2003–2011: overseas community
  - In the 2009 Mahoran status referendum, Mahorans voted to become an overseas department in 2011, which occurred on 31 March 2011.
- Réunion (since 1946)

=== Overseas collectivities ===
The category of "overseas collectivity" (French: collectivité d'outre-mer or COM) was created by France's constitutional reform of 28 March 2003. Each overseas collectivity has its own statutory laws.

In contrast to overseas departments and regions, the overseas collectivities are empowered to make their own laws, except in certain areas reserved to the French national government (such as defense, international relations, trade and currency, and judicial and administrative law). The overseas collectivities are governed by local elected assemblies and by the French Parliament and French Government, with a cabinet member, the Minister of the Overseas, in charge of issues related to the overseas territories.

- French Polynesia (1946–2003: overseas territory; since 2003: overseas collectivity): In 2004 it was given the designation of "overseas country" (French: pays d'outre-mer), but the Constitutional Council of France has ruled that this designation did not create a new political category.
- Saint Barthélemy: In 2003, Saint-Barthélemy voted to become an overseas collectivity of France. Saint-Barthélemy is not part of the European Union, having changed the status to an overseas country or territory associated with the European Union in 2012.
- Saint Martin: In a 2003 referendum, Saint Martin voted in favour of secession from Guadeloupe to become separate overseas collectivity of France. On 7 February 2007, the French Parliament passed a bill granting COM status to Saint Martin and Saint Barthélemy. The new status took effect on 22 February 2007, when the law was published in the Journal Officiel. Saint Martin remains part of the European Union, as stated in the Treaty of Lisbon.
- Saint Pierre and Miquelon (1976–85: overseas department; 1985–2003: sui generis overseas territory; since 2003: overseas collectivity): Despite being given the political status of "overseas collectivity", Saint Pierre et Miquelon is called collectivité territoriale de Saint-Pierre-et-Miquelon, literally "territorial collectivity".
- Wallis and Futuna (1961–2003: overseas territory; since 2003: overseas collectivity): It is still commonly referred to as a territoire (Territoire des îles Wallis et Futuna).

=== Sui generis collectivity ===
- New Caledonia had the status of an overseas territory from 1946 to 1998, but as of the 1998 Nouméa Accord it gained a special status (statut particulier or sui generis) in 1999. A New Caledonian citizenship was established (in addition to the French citizenship which is kept in parallel, along with the European citizenship), and a gradual transfer of power from the French state to New Caledonia itself was begun, to last from 15 to 20 years. However, this process was subject to approval in a referendum. Three independence referendums have been held, in 2018, 2020 and 2021. In the first two referendums, the "yes" vote was 43.3% and 46.7% respectively. In the third referendum of December 2021, massively boycotted by the native Kanak community, which represent 42% of the population, the "yes" vote was 3.5%, with a turnout of 43.9%.

=== Overseas territory ===
- French Southern and Antarctic Lands (Terres australes et antarctiques françaises or TAAF); overseas territory of France (since 1956). It is currently the only overseas territory. According to law 2007-224 of 21 February 2007, the Scattered Islands in the Indian Ocean constitute the 5th district of TAAF.

=== Special status ===
- Clipperton Island (French: Île de Clipperton or Île de la Passion; Spanish: Isla de la Pasión) is a 9 km^{2} (3.5 sq mi) uninhabited coral atoll located 1,280 km (800 miles) south-west of Acapulco, Mexico in the Pacific Ocean. It is held as an overseas "state private property" under the direct authority of the French government, and is administered by France's Minister of the Overseas ("private" in this context refers to official restrictions on access, rather than private ownership per se).

== Political representation in legislatures ==
Flag of the Minister of Overseas France

With 2,891,000 inhabitants in 2026, overseas France accounts for 4.15% of the population of the French Republic. They enjoy a corresponding representation in the two chambers of the French Parliament and, in the 16th legislature of the French Fifth Republic (2022–2027), overseas France is represented by 27 deputies in the French National Assembly, accounting for 4.7% of the 577 deputies in the National Assembly:

- Réunion: 7
- Guadeloupe: 4
- Martinique: 4
- French Polynesia: 3
- French Guiana: 2
- Mayotte: 2
- New Caledonia: 2
- Saint Barthélemy and Saint Martin: 1
- Saint Pierre and Miquelon: 1
- Wallis and Futuna: 1

Since September 2011, overseas France has been represented by 21 senators in the French Senate, accounting for 6.0% of the 348 senators in the Senate:

- Réunion: 4
- Guadeloupe: 3
- French Guiana: 2
- French Polynesia: 2
- Martinique: 2
- Mayotte: 2
- New Caledonia: 2
- Saint Barthélemy: 1
- Saint Martin: 1
- Saint Pierre and Miquelon: 1
- Wallis and Futuna: 1

=== European Union representation ===
The territories used to be collectively represented in the European Parliament by the Overseas Territories of France constituency until the 2019 European elections, when all French constituencies merged to form a single constituency.

Overseas France and other special territories of EU member states are not separately represented in the EU Council. Every member state represents all its citizens in the council.

== Overview ==
=== Inhabited collectivities and departments/regions ===
The eleven inhabited French overseas territories are:

Flag (Note: Article 2 of the French Constitution states that the French tricolour is the only legal flag of France. Only French Polynesia, an overseas country, and New Caledonia, a sui generis collectivity, are allowed to have their official flags. This right was granted to French Polynesia by a 6 September 1984 law and to New Caledonia by the Nouméa Accord. The Administrator of French Antarctica is also granted their own flag through a 23 February 2007 ordinance. Historical flags are sometimes used but have no basis in law. Many territories use unofficial flags to represent the territories. The unofficial flags are shown in this table. Saint Martin does not to have a co-official or an unofficial flag, so the flag of France is used.)	Name	Capital	Official language(s)	Population	Area (km^{2})	Population Density (inh. per km^{2})	Status	EU/EEA Status	UN Continental Region	UN Geographical Subregion	Location	Notes
	French Guiana	Cayenne	French	298,554 (Jan. 2026)	83,534	3.6	Overseas department/region	Outermost Region	Americas	South America	The Guianas	
French Polynesia	French Polynesia	Papeete	French, Tahitian	279,515 (Jan. 2025)	3,521	79	Overseas collectivity/country	Overseas Country or Territory	Oceania	Polynesia	South Pacific Ocean	The most populous island is Tahiti.
	Guadeloupe	Basse-Terre	French	382,586 (Jan. 2026)	1,628	235	Overseas department/region	Outermost Region	Americas	Caribbean	Leeward Islands	
	Martinique	Fort-de-France	French	358,818 (Jan. 2026)	1,128	318	Overseas department/region	Outermost Region	Americas	Caribbean	Windward Islands	
	Mayotte	Mamoudzou	French	338,208 (Jan. 2026)	374	904	Overseas department/region	Outermost Region	Africa	Eastern Africa	Comoro Islands	Also claimed by the Comoros.
	New Caledonia	Nouméa	French	264,596 (Apr. 2025)	18,575.5	14.2	Sui generis collectivity	Overseas Country or Territory	Oceania	Melanesia	South Pacific Ocean	
	Réunion	Saint Denis	French	910,985 (Jan. 2026)	2,504	364	Overseas department/region	Outermost Region	Africa	Eastern Africa	Mascarene Islands	
	Saint Barthélemy	Gustavia	French	10,660 (Jan. 2023)	25 (Note: 25 km² including the outlying uninhabited islets. 21 km² without the outlying islets.)	426	Overseas collectivity	Overseas Country or Territory	Americas	Caribbean	Leeward Islands	Detached from Guadeloupe on 22 February 2007.
	Saint Martin	Marigot	French	31,160 (Jan. 2023)	53	588	Overseas collectivity	Outermost Region	Americas	Caribbean	Leeward Islands	Detached from Guadeloupe on 22 February 2007.
	Saint Pierre and Miquelon	Saint Pierre	French	5,819 (Jan. 2022)	242	24	Overseas collectivity	Overseas Country or Territory	Americas	Northern America	Gulf of St. Lawrence	
	Wallis and Futuna	Mata Utu	French	11,151 (Jul. 2023)	142	79	Overseas collectivity	Overseas Country or Territory	Oceania	Polynesia	South Pacific Ocean	

=== Uninhabited overseas territories ===
Several of these territories are generally only transiently inhabited by researchers in scientific stations.

Flag	Name	TAAF District	Island	Capital	Area (km^{2})	Status	Location	Notes
	Clipperton Island	–	–	–	2	Overseas state private property	North Pacific Ocean	
French Southern and Antarctic Lands	French Southern and Antarctic Lands	Adélie Land	–	Dumont d'Urville Station	432,000	Overseas territory	Antarctica	Under the terms of the Antarctic Treaty.
French Southern and Antarctic Lands	French Southern and Antarctic Lands	Crozet Islands	–	Alfred Faure	340	Overseas territory	Indian Ocean	
French Southern and Antarctic Lands	French Southern and Antarctic Lands	Kerguelen Islands	–	Port-aux-Français	7,215	Overseas territory	Indian Ocean	Population: 45 researchers in winter, 110 in summer.
French Southern and Antarctic Lands	French Southern and Antarctic Lands	Saint Paul and Amsterdam Islands	Amsterdam Island	Martin-de-Viviès	66	Overseas territory	Indian Ocean	
French Southern and Antarctic Lands	French Southern and Antarctic Lands	Saint Paul and Amsterdam Islands	Saint Paul Island	Martin-de-Viviès	66	Overseas territory	Indian Ocean	
French Southern and Antarctic Lands	French Southern and Antarctic Lands	Scattered Islands in the Indian Ocean	Banc du Geyser	Saint Pierre, Réunion	0	Overseas territory	Mozambique Channel	Claimed by the Comoros and Madagascar.
French Southern and Antarctic Lands	French Southern and Antarctic Lands	Scattered Islands in the Indian Ocean	Bassas da India	Saint Pierre, Réunion	1	Overseas territory	Mozambique Channel	Claimed by Madagascar.
French Southern and Antarctic Lands	French Southern and Antarctic Lands	Scattered Islands in the Indian Ocean	Europa Island	Saint Pierre, Réunion	30	Overseas territory	Mozambique Channel	Claimed by Madagascar.
French Southern and Antarctic Lands	French Southern and Antarctic Lands	Scattered Islands in the Indian Ocean	Glorioso Islands	Saint Pierre, Réunion	7	Overseas territory	Indian Ocean	Claimed by the Comoros and Madagascar.
French Southern and Antarctic Lands	French Southern and Antarctic Lands	Scattered Islands in the Indian Ocean	Juan de Nova Island	Saint Pierre, Réunion	5	Overseas territory	Mozambique Channel	Claimed by Madagascar.
French Southern and Antarctic Lands	French Southern and Antarctic Lands	Scattered Islands in the Indian Ocean	Tromelin Island	Saint Pierre, Réunion	1	Overseas territory	Indian Ocean	Claimed by Mauritius.

=== Map ===
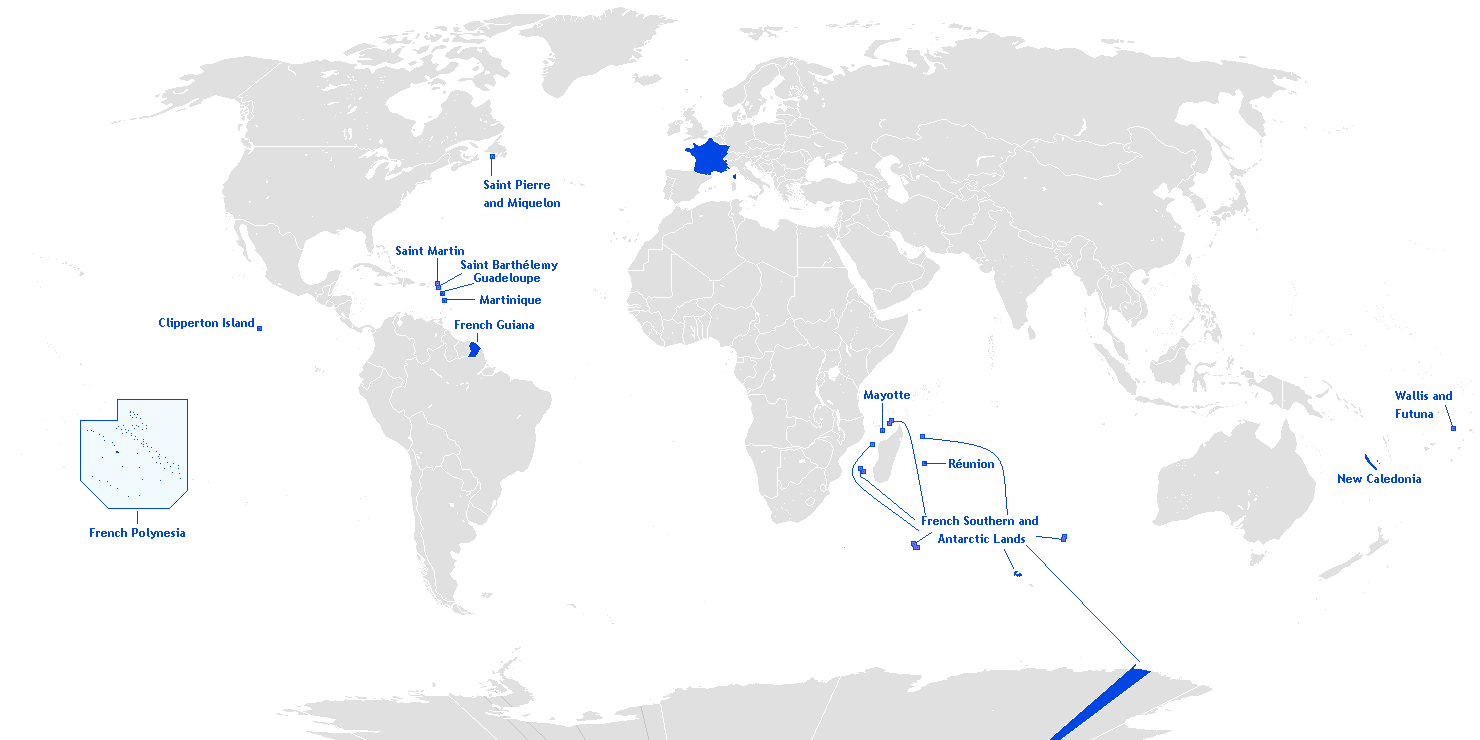

=== Photo gallery ===
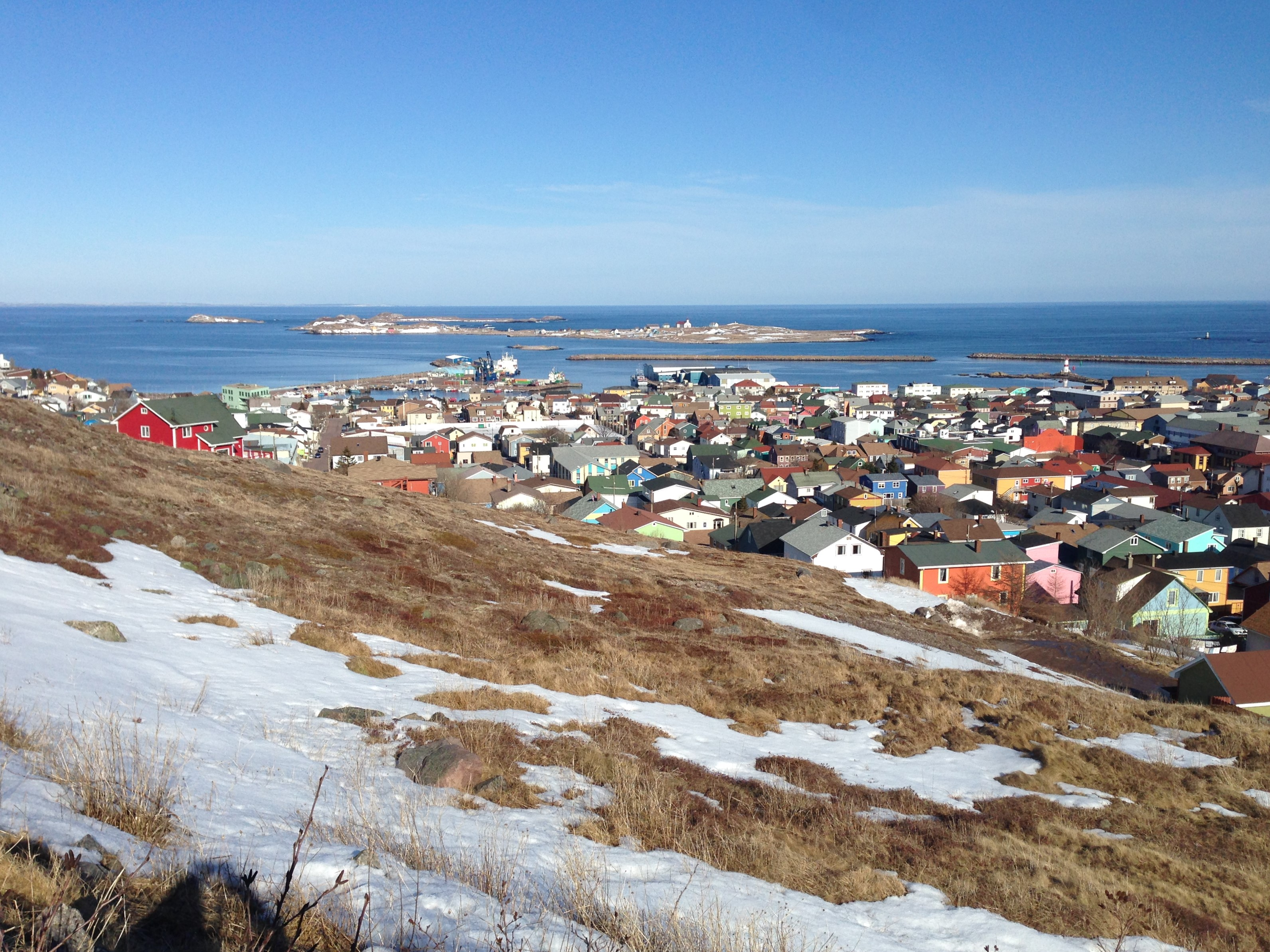
Saint-Pierre, Saint Pierre and Miquelon

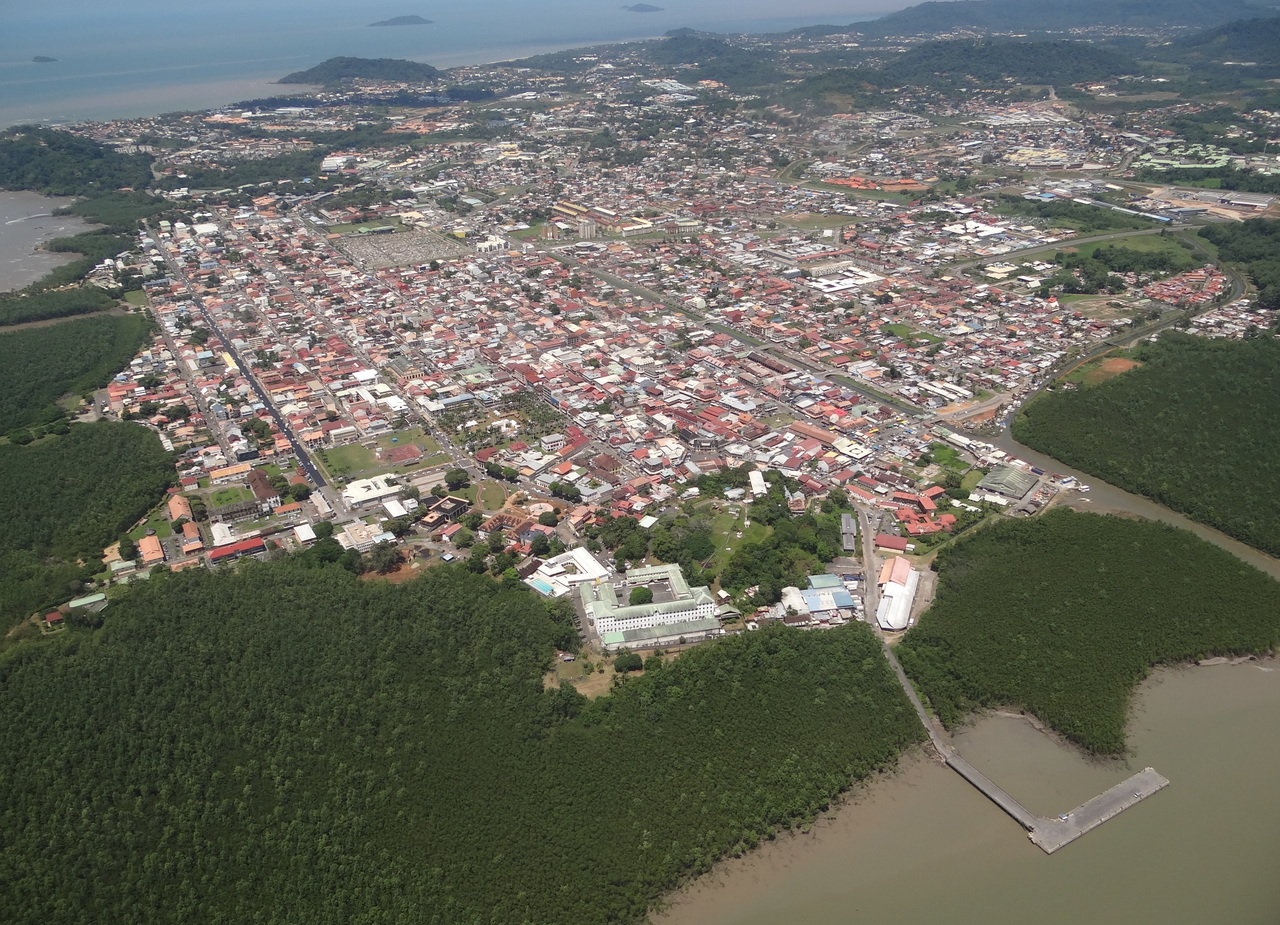
Cayenne, French Guiana

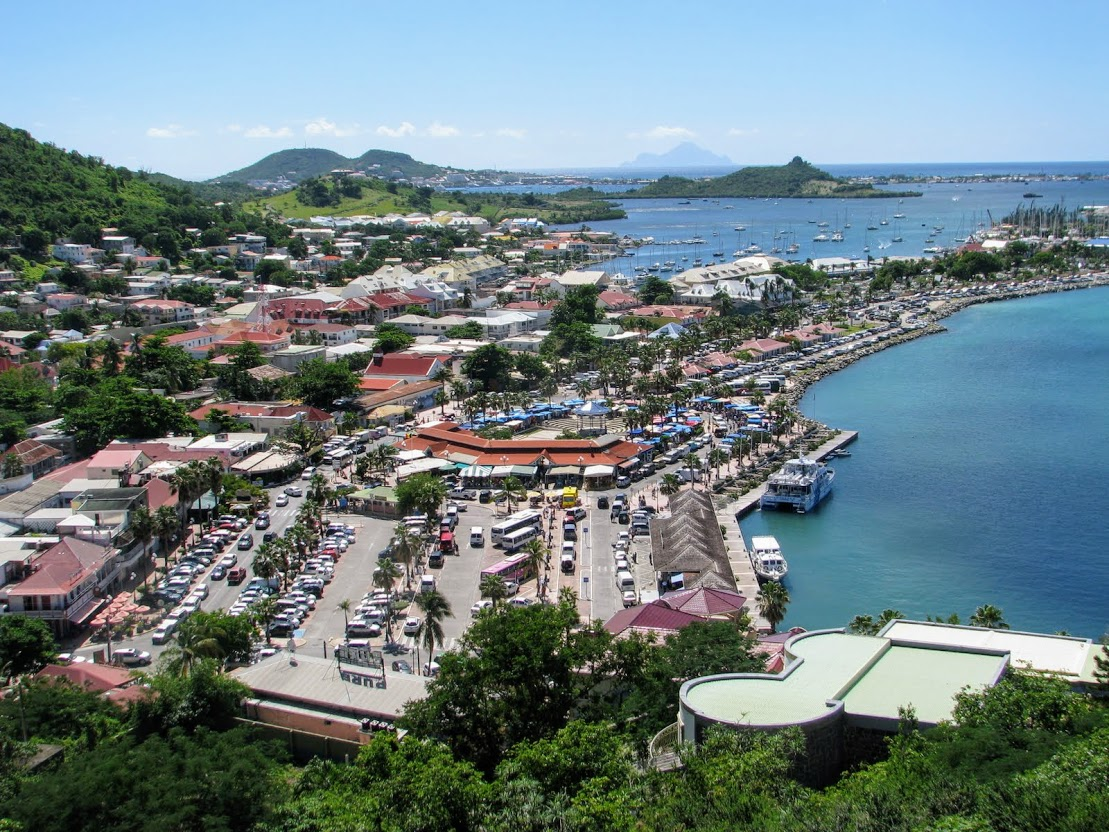
Marigot, Saint Martin

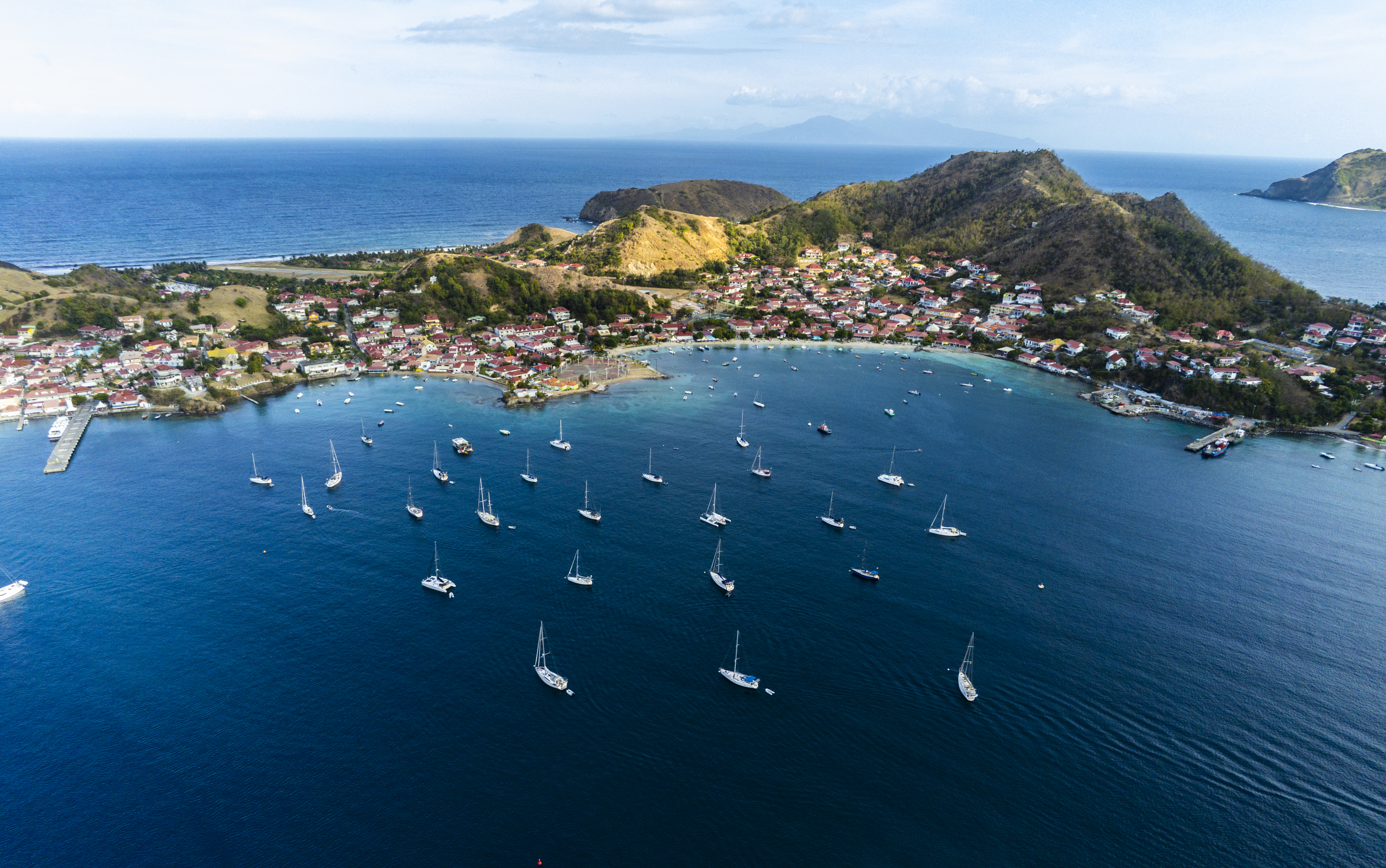
Guadeloupe

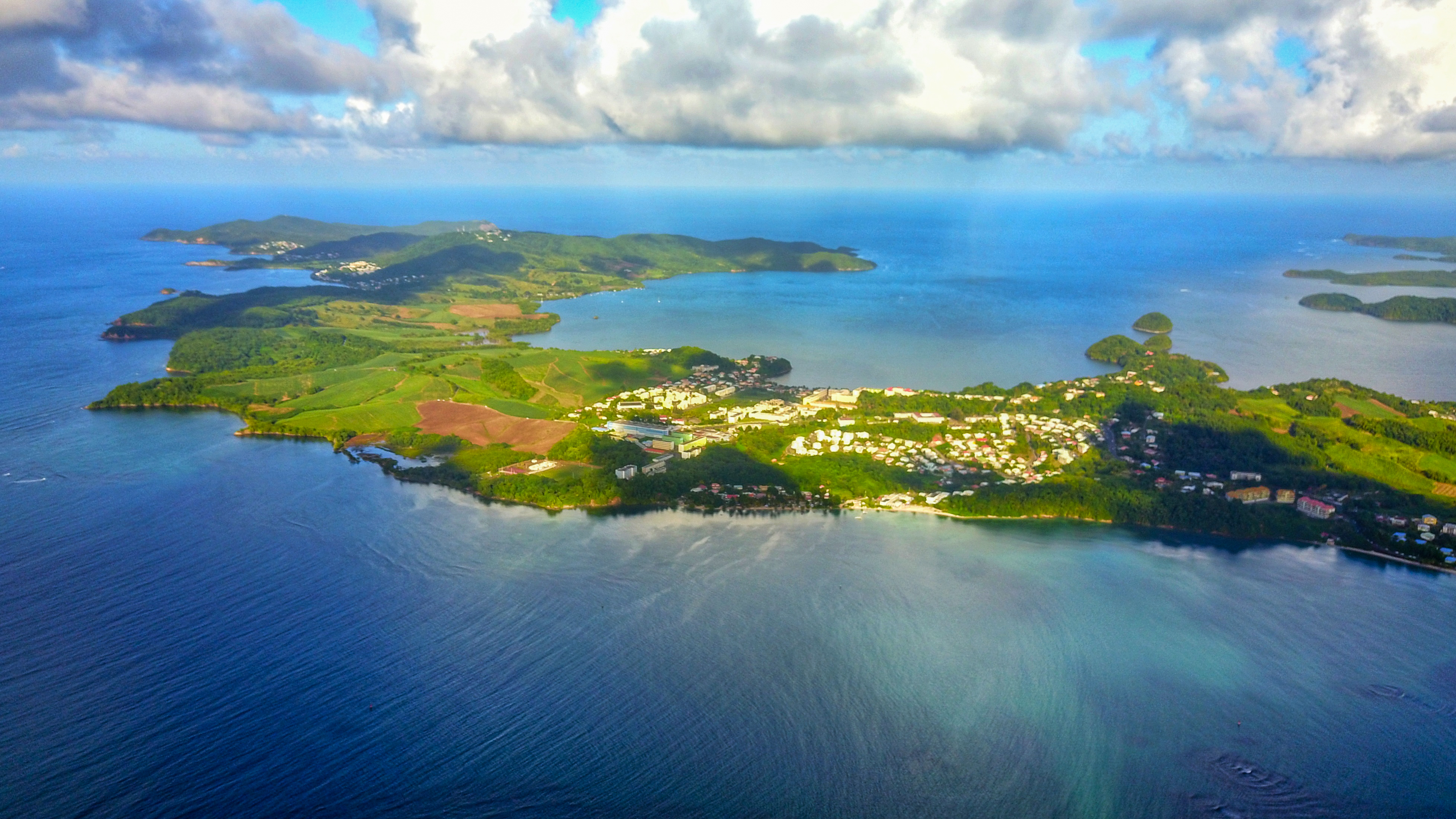
Martinique

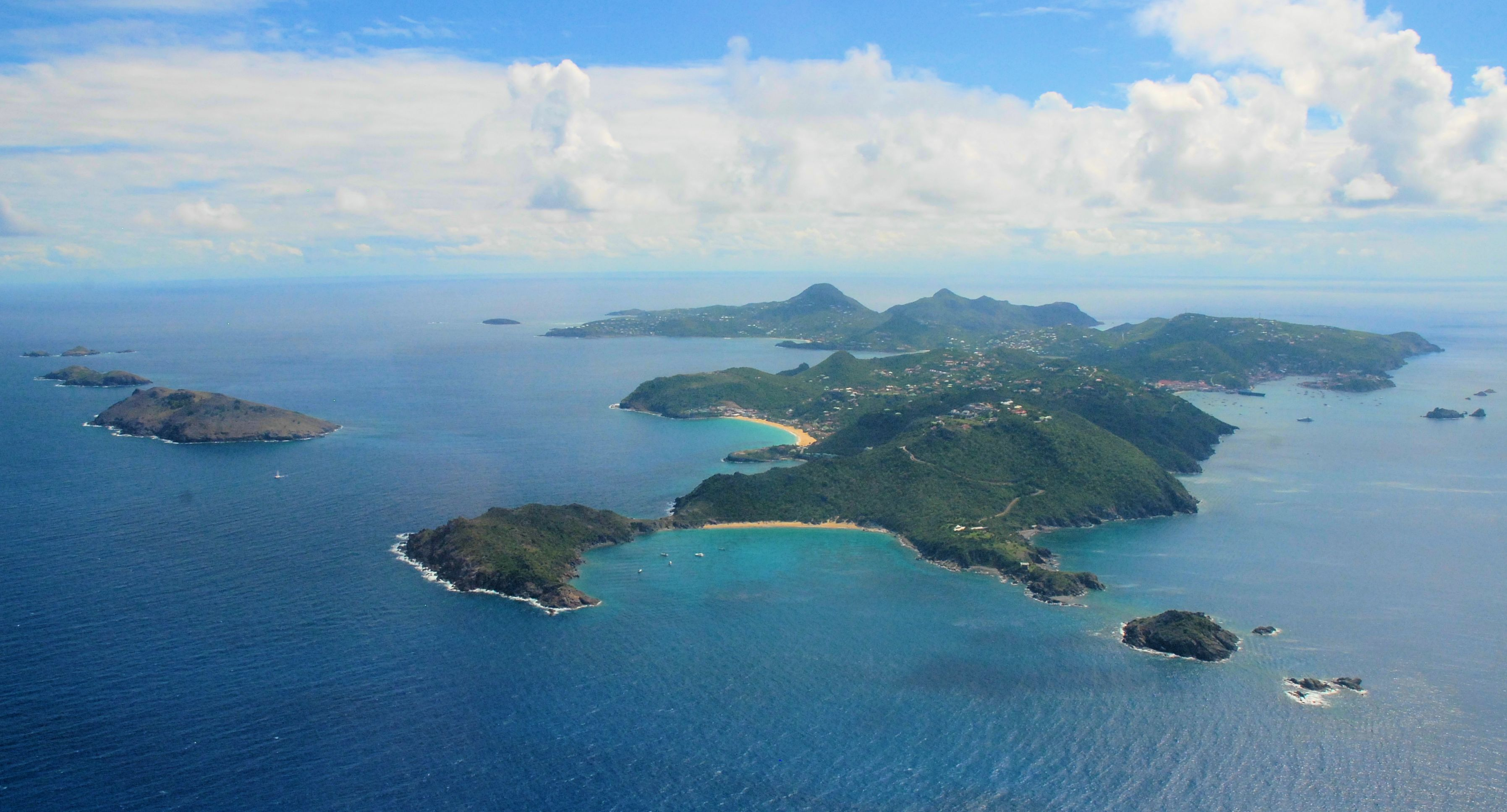
Saint Barthélemy

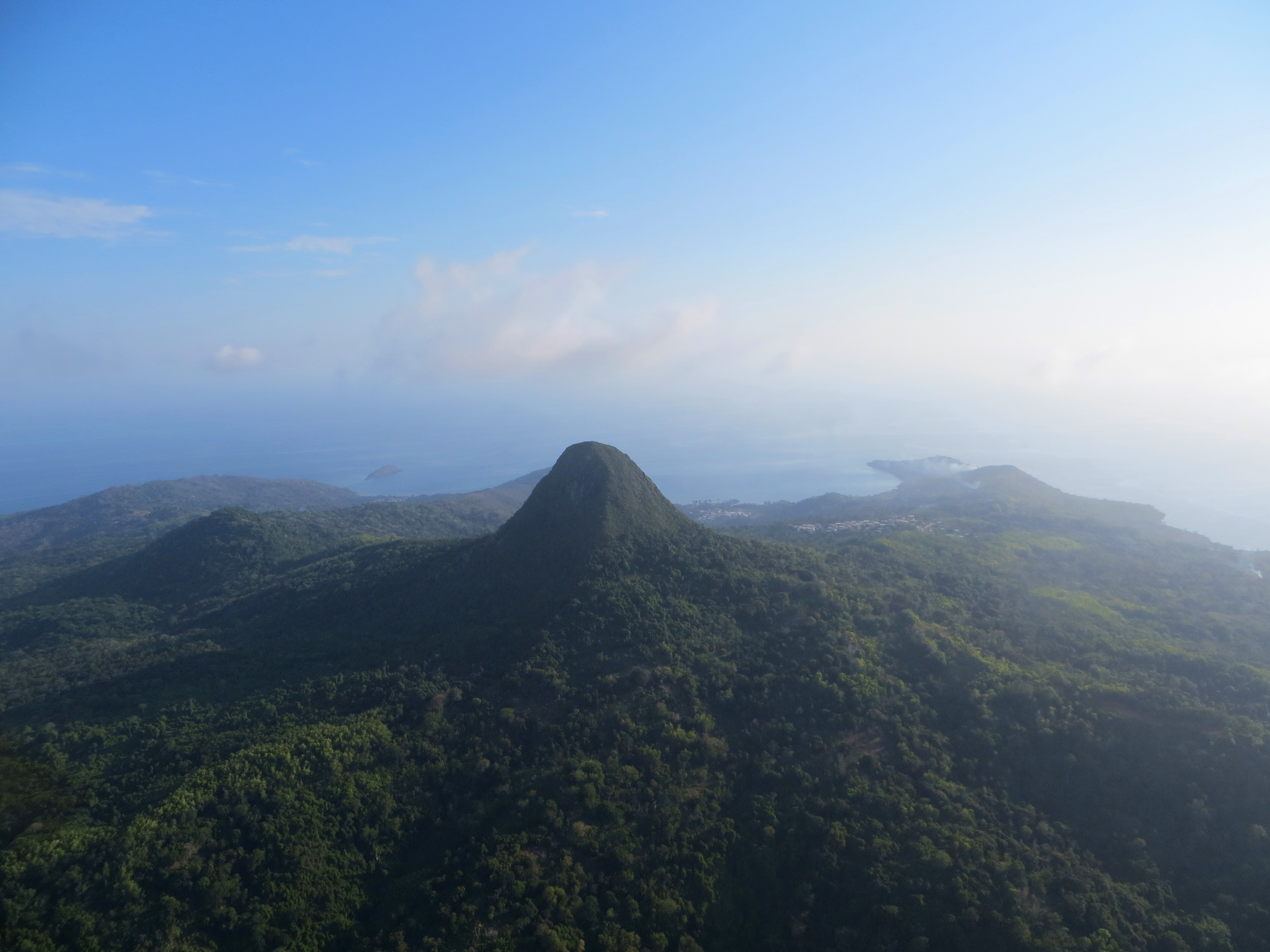
Mont Choungui, Mayotte

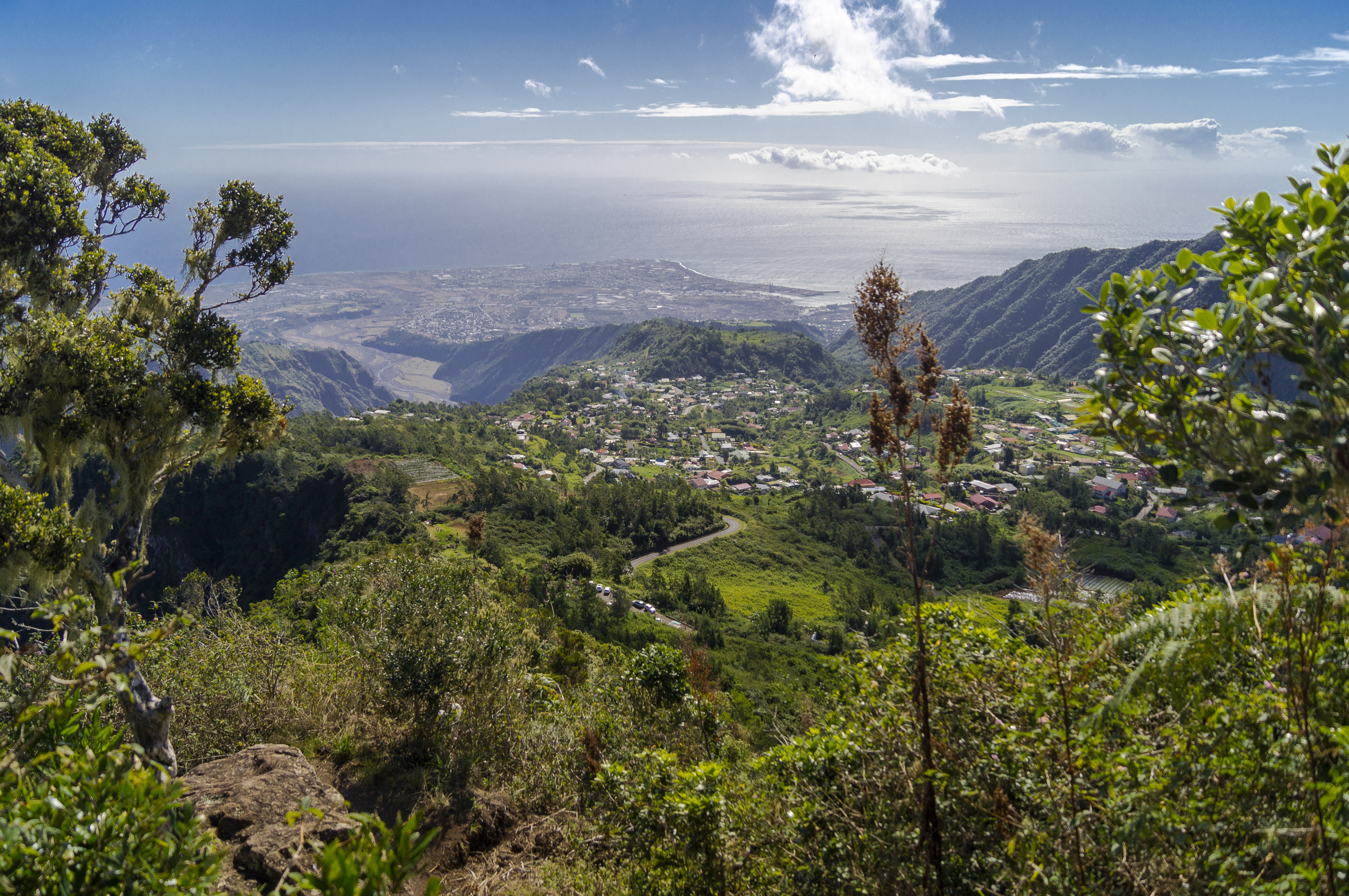
Réunion

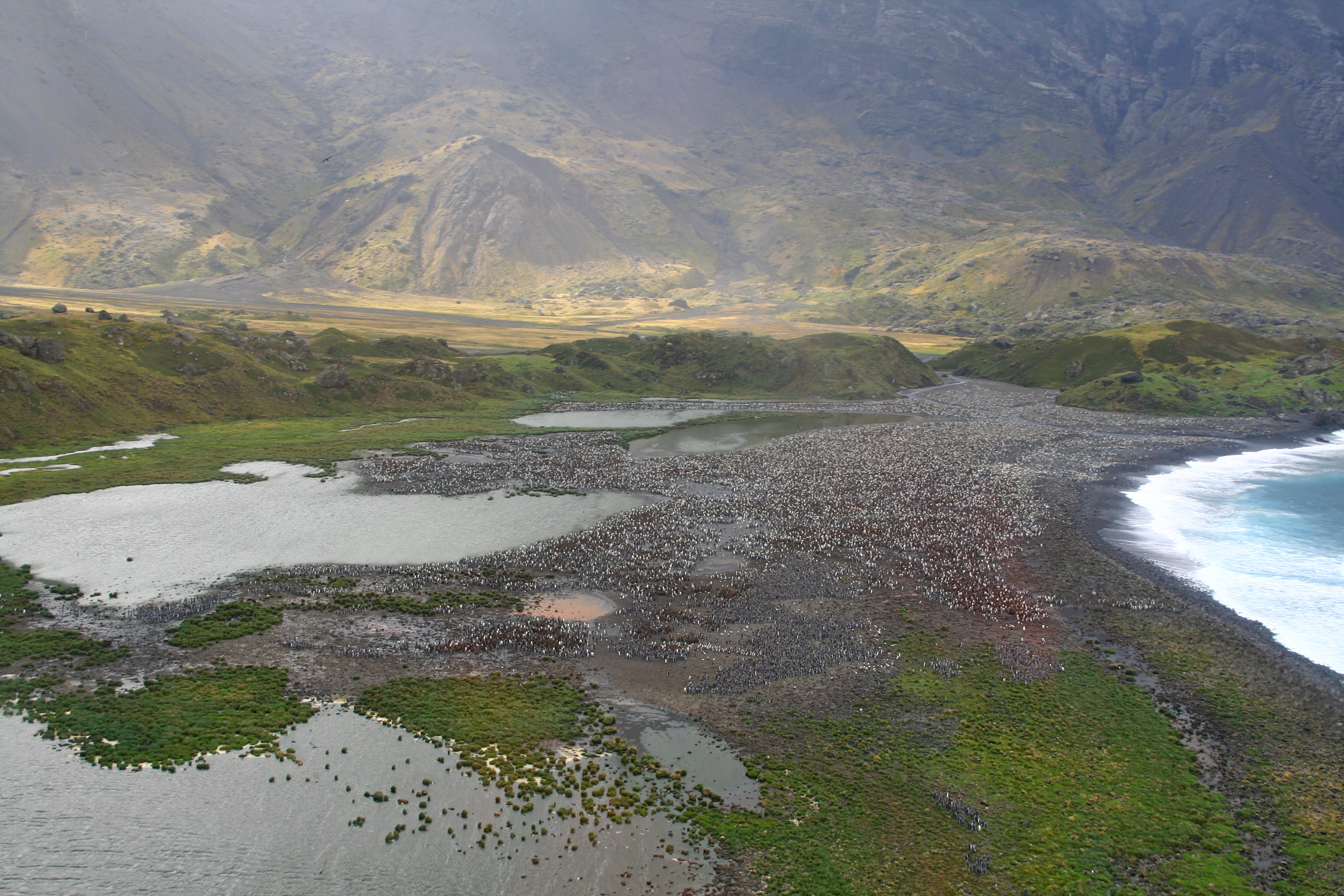
Île de l'Est, Crozet Islands, French Southern and Antarctic Lands

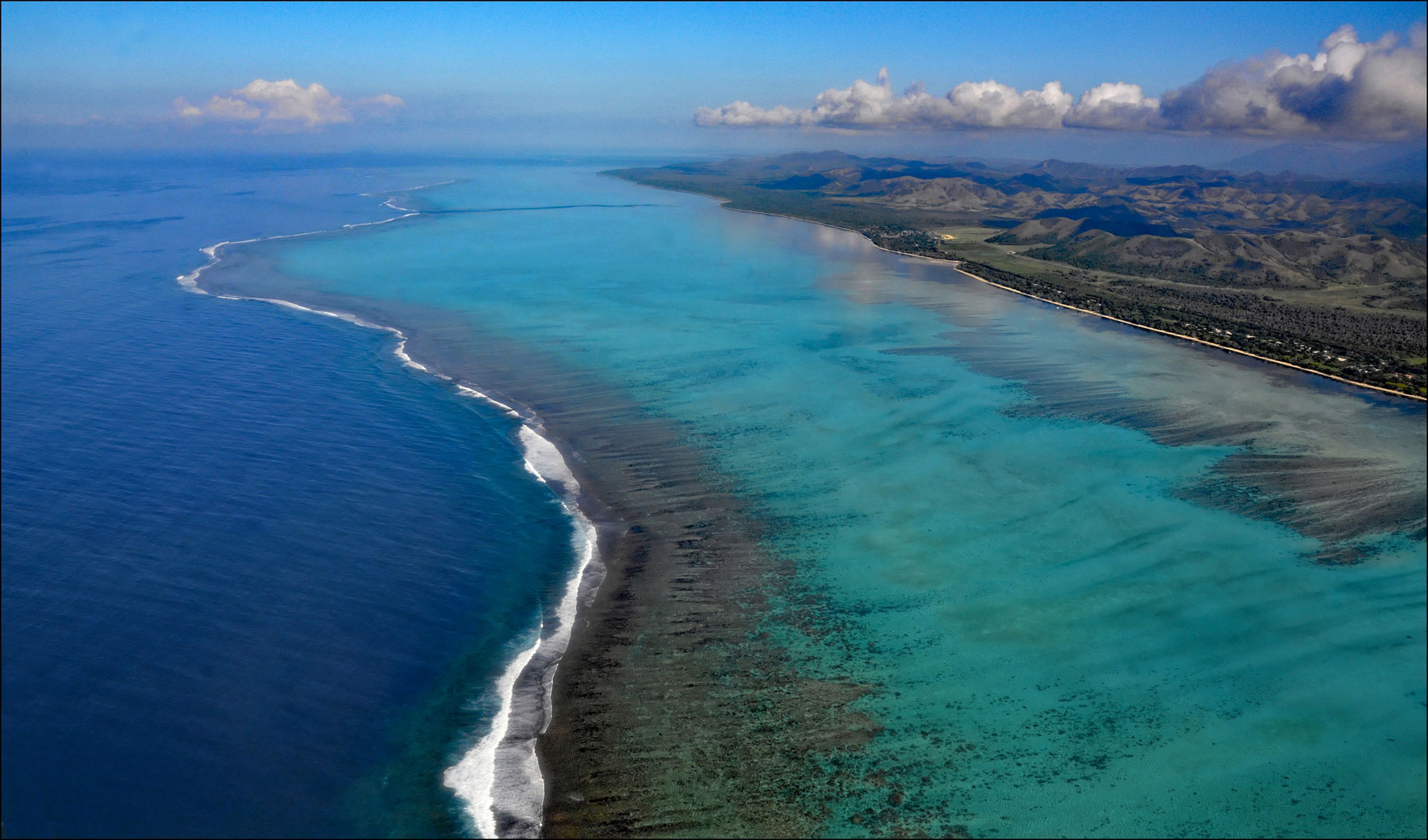
New Caledonia

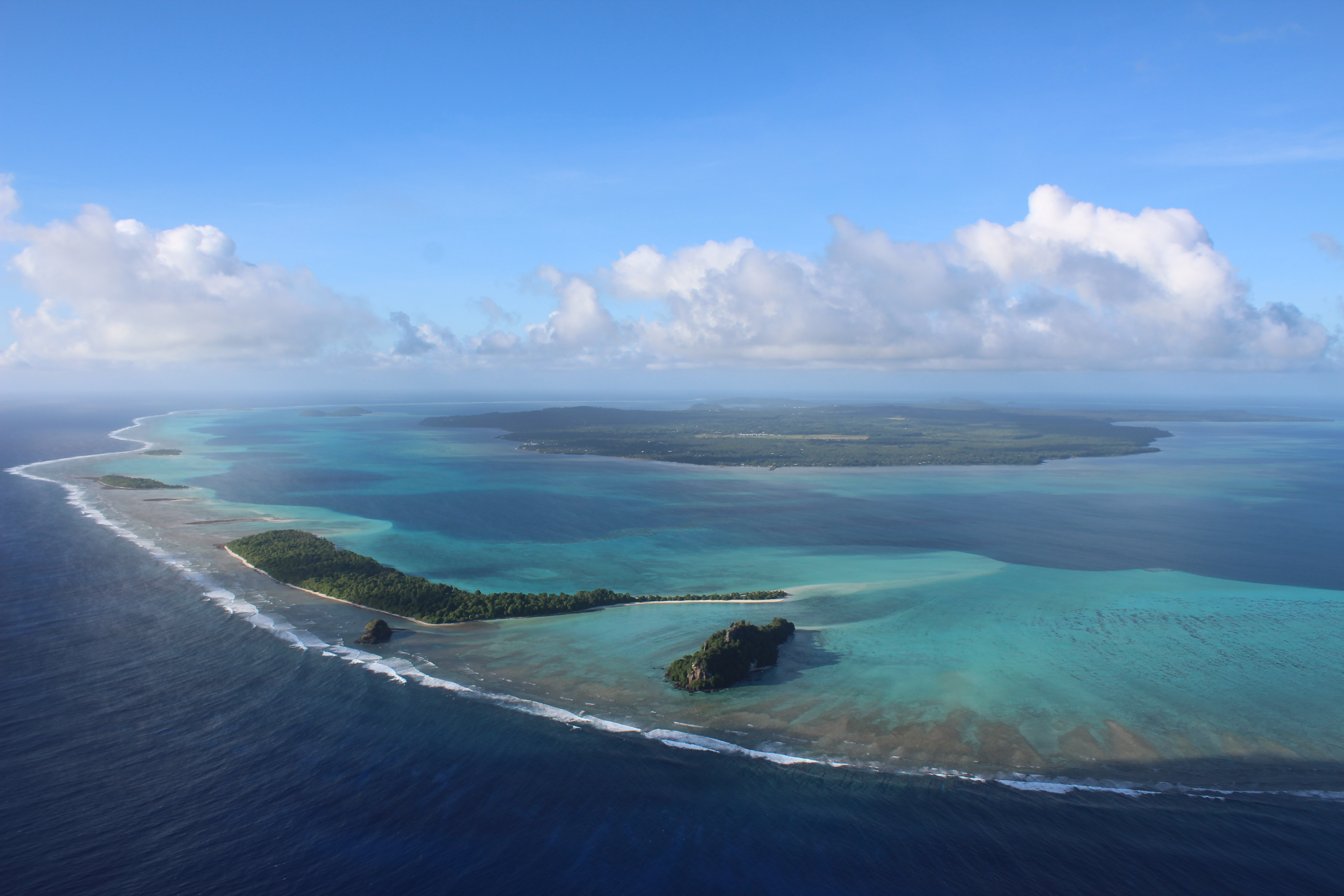
Wallis Island, Wallis and Futuna

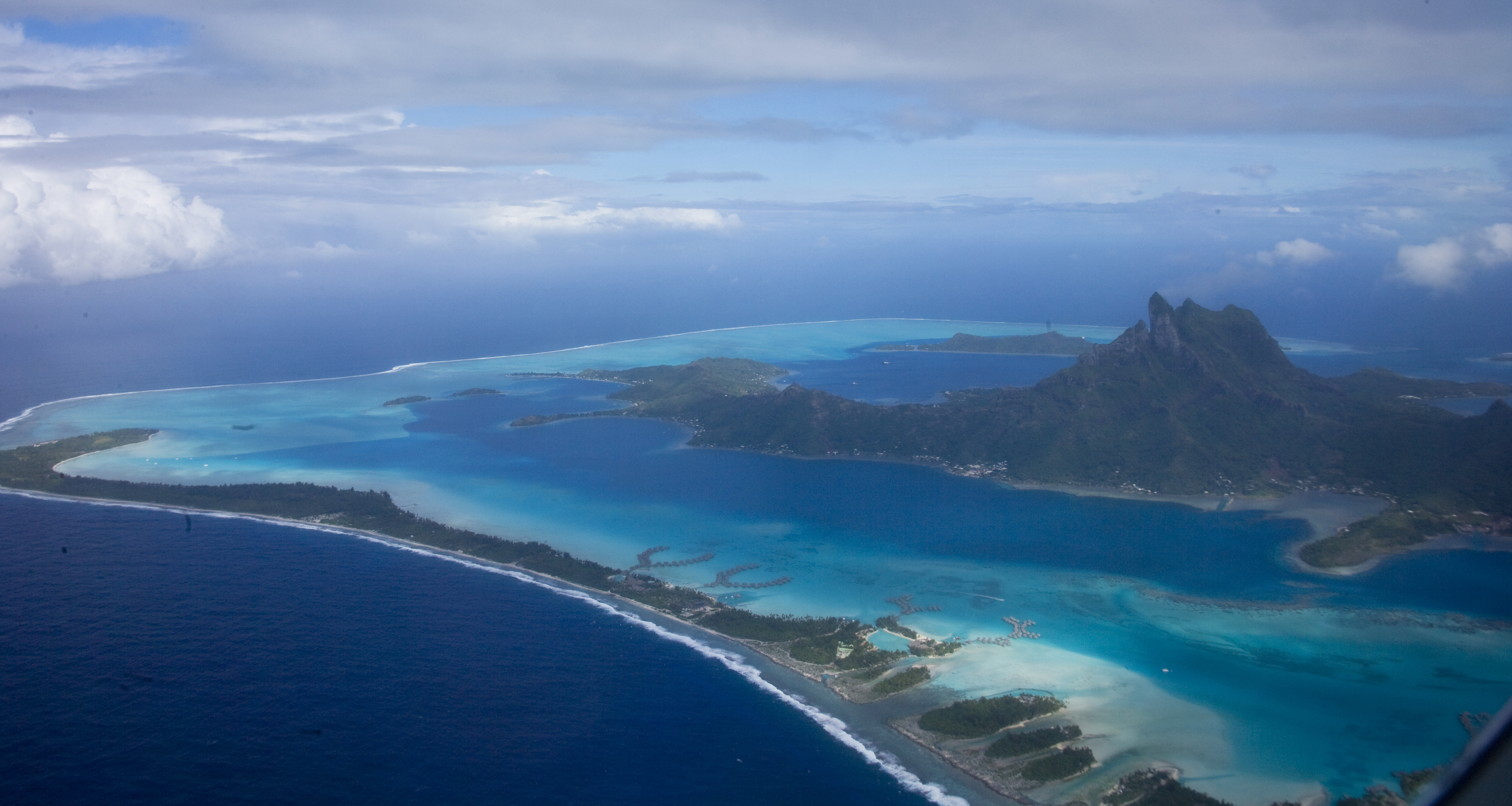
Bora Bora, French Polynesia

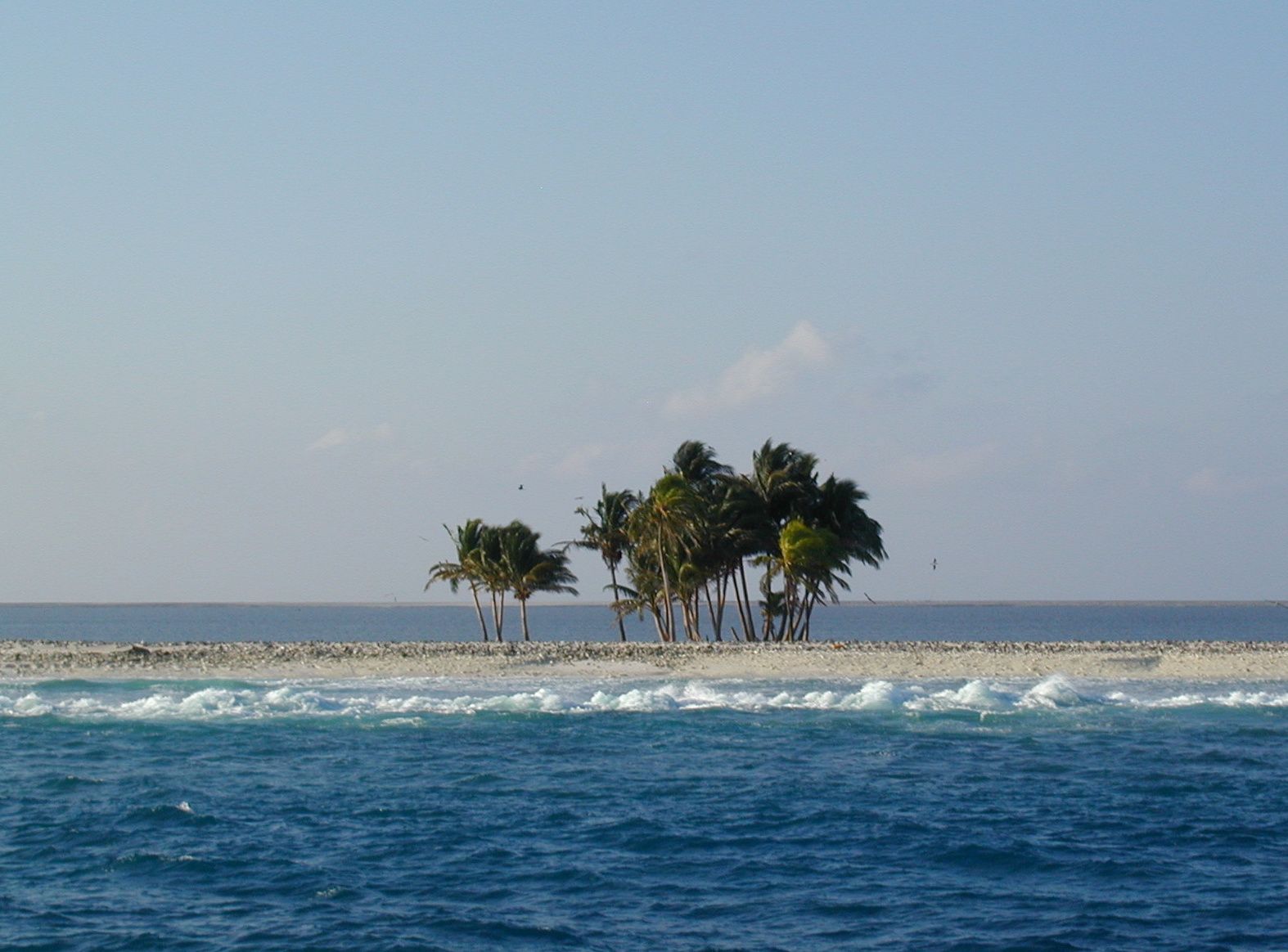
Clipperton Island

== Largest cities in overseas France ==
Ranked by population in the metropolitan area:

- Fort-de-France (Martinique): 346,577 inhabitants (in 2023)
- Saint Denis (Réunion): 326,743 (in 2023)
- Pointe-à-Pitre–Les Abymes (Guadeloupe): 315,878 (in 2023)
- Saint Pierre–Le Tampon (Réunion): 227,067 (in 2023)
- Saint Paul (Réunion): 177,472 (in 2023)
- Nouméa (New Caledonia): 173,814 (in 2025)
- Cayenne (French Guiana): 153,884 (in 2023)
- Papeete (French Polynesia): 138,861 (in 2022)

== See also ==
- 2009 Mahoran status referendum
- Administrative divisions of France
- Communes of France
- French colonial empire
- Government of France
- List of French possessions and colonies
- List of islands administered by France in the Indian and Pacific oceans
- Metropolitan France
- Organisation internationale de la Francophonie
- Outre-mer
- Overseas collectivity
- Overseas department and region
- Overseas military bases of France
- Overseas Territories of France (European Parliament constituency)
- Overseas territory
- Special member state territories and the European Union
- Volontaire Civil à l'Aide Technique
- French claims in Jerusalem:
  - Church of the Pater Noster
  - Benedictine monastery in Abu Ghosh
  - Tombs of the Kings
  - Church of Saint Anne
- Other overseas territories of sovereign nations:
  - British Overseas Territories
  - Danish Realm
  - Kingdom of the Netherlands
  - Territories of the United States
