= 2009 Mahoran status referendum =

Referendum in Mayotte, France

A referendum on becoming an overseas department of France was held in Mayotte on 29 March 2009. Mayotte had been a departmental collectivity of France since 2001. In contrast to the four other similar regions (French Guiana, Guadeloupe, Martinique, and Réunion), Mayotte would not have become an Overseas Department (DOM) or an Overseas Region (ROM), but would only have had a single assembly; the four other existing DOM/ROM will have the option of changing their status to this format as well.

As a result of the yes vote, Mayotte became the 101st French department in 2011, and the first with a population overwhelmingly of the Muslim faith.

== Background ==
The population of Mayotte was approximately 186,000 at the time of the election. Ninety-five percent of Maorais are Sunni Muslims. Many Maorais are fluent only in local languages, including Shimaore and Bushi, rather than the French language. It is believed that one-third of the population consists of illegal immigrants, mostly from the neighboring, impoverished Comoros islands. Continued political union with France has allowed Mayotte to remain relatively prosperous, at least by regional standards, compared to the independent Comoros. The Comoros, which has suffered from economic and political instability since its independence, continues to claim Mayotte as part of its territory.

French President Nicolas Sarkozy promised a referendum on Mayotte's future status during the 2007 French presidential election.

Many Maorais hoped to benefit economically in the future with a possible yes result. The unemployment rate in Mayotte stood at over 25% at the time of the 2009 referendum.

=== Support ===
All of Mayotte's major political parties and politicians, including the General Council President Ahmed Attoumani Douchina, supported the "yes" campaign. For example, Abdoulatifou Aly, a Maorais legislator, supported the "yes" campaign arguing that Mayotte has a longer history within France than some areas of the mainland in an interview with L'Express, "We may be black, poor and Muslim, but we have been French longer than Nice." The campaign also received strong support from the French government in Paris.

Public opinion polls leading up to the referendum showed strong support for closer political union from the vast majority of Mayotte's citizens, and the "yes" campaign was expected to win by a wide margin. Many saw the comparative advantages of full French citizenship as greater than the need to retain some traditional local customs, such as polygamy, which would be eliminated under French law.

=== Local opposition ===
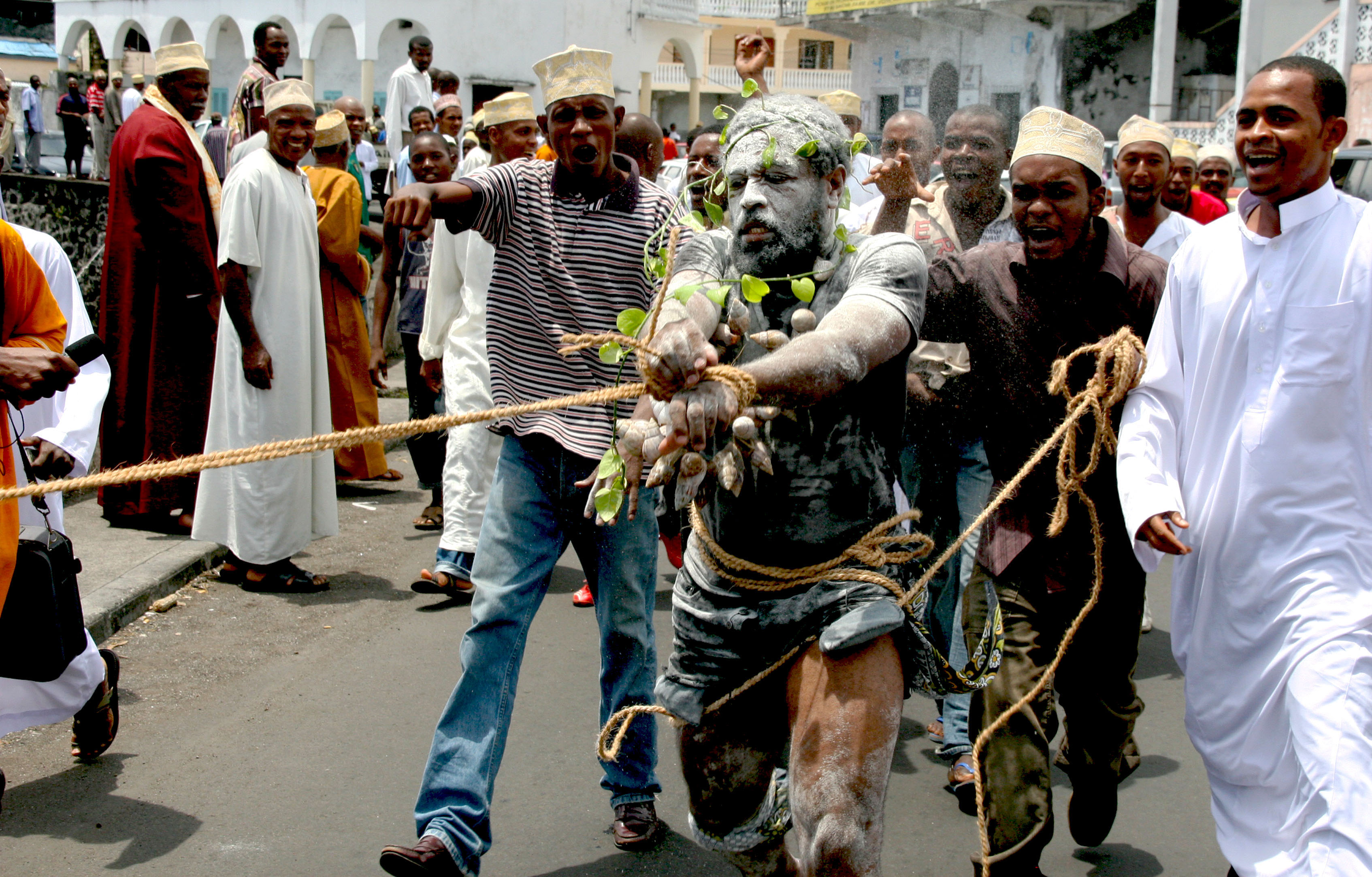
Comorians protesting against Mayotte becoming an overseas department of France

Some Islamic imams and religious leaders had urged a "no" vote. The imam of Mamoudzou, Mayotte's capital city, campaigned strongly against the referendum due to the expected abolition of polygamy with a "yes" victory. "The law of the Quran permits a man to have two or three wives. I'm polygamous. I've already let go of two or three wives in the past."

== Results ==
Early poll results indicated that the "yes" option had received approximately 95.2% of the total votes cast. The estimated voter turnout was a high 61% of eligible Maorais.

Choice	Votes	%
For	41,160	95.24
Against	2,055	4.76
Total	43,215	100.00
Valid votes	43,215	98.59
Invalid/blank votes	616	1.41
Total votes	43,831	100.00
Registered voters/turnout	71,420	61.37
Source: Direct Democracy

== Reactions ==
French Interior Minister Michele Alliot-Marie hailed the results of the landslide election saying, "This will reinforce the place of Mayotte in the republic, reaffirming our founding values, particularly equality between men and women, the same justice for all, and the place of the French language."

The move was opposed by the African Union and the Comoros, who both claim it is "occupation by a foreign power" and several protests were held in Moroni, capital of Comoros. The Comoran vice-president said the vote was a "declaration of war".

== Referendum implications ==
With a yes result, Mayotte, which had been an overseas collectivity, became a French department on 31 March 2011.

Local judicial, economic and social laws and customs were changed to conform with French law. Mayotte banned polygamy before it became a department. Women's rights were increased to French standards. Women did not have equal inheritance rights in Mayotte, which was later modified to comply with the French justice system. The minimum age in which a person can legally marry was raised from 15 to 18 years old. Mayotte legalised same-sex and opposite-sex civil unions.

The traditional Mayotte local court system, which combined Quranic principles of Islam with African and Malagasy customs, was phased out in favor of the French legal system. Islamic law was abolished and replaced by uniform French civil code. Mayotte had a traditional Islamic legal system consisting of qadis, as religious scholars were known, who acted as judges in cases related to Islamic law. Islamic courts and justice system were replaced by secular courts, though the qadis retained a role as legal consultants.

As a department, Mayotte became eligible for expanded French social and economic programs, as well as European Union funds. However, the French government did not immediately extend the social welfare system enjoyed by metropolitan France. Instead, social service benefits were gradually extended to Maorais citizens over a period of 20 years, until they are equal to those enjoyed in metropolitan France. The French government also promised financial support to strengthen Maorais infrastructure.

Income taxes were increased as a result of integration with the French republic.
