= VCAT =

VCAT is an acronym for:

- Volontaire Civil à l'Aide Technique, a French foreign agency
- Victorian Civil and Administrative Tribunal, an agency of the Government of Victoria
- Virtual concatenation is a network standard that allows the use of non-consecutive timeslots in SONET/SDH.
- Veterinary College Admission Test, a former veterinary school admissions examination
