= ZDJ =

ZDJ or zdj may refer to:

- Bern railway station, Switzerland, station code ZDJ
- Ngazidja dialect of Comorian languages, ISO 639-3 language code zdj
