= Overseas collectivity =

Type of French territorial collectivity

In France, an overseas collectivity (French: collectivité d'outre-mer, abbreviated as COM) is a first-order administrative division, on the same level as a region, but with a semi-autonomous status. The COMs include some former French overseas colonies and other overseas entities with a particular status, all of which became COMs by constitutional reform on 28 March 2003. The COMs differ from overseas regions and overseas departments, which have the same status as metropolitan France but are located outside Europe. As integral parts of France, overseas collectivities are represented in the National Assembly, Senate and Economic and Social Council. Though some are outside the European Union, all can vote to elect members of the European Parliament (MEPs). (All of France became one multi-member EU constituency in 2019.) The Pacific COMs use the CFP franc, a currency pegged to the euro, whereas the Atlantic COMs use the euro itself. As of 31 March 2011, there were five COMs:

- French Polynesia became a COM in 2003, and has a great deal of autonomy. Its statutory law of 27 February 2004 gives it the designation of overseas country inside the Republic (French: pays d'outre-mer au sein de la République, or POM), but without legal modification of its status. Its executive is the president of French Polynesia (Le président de la Polynésie française), and its legislature since 2004 is the Assembly of French Polynesia.
- Saint Barthélemy, an island in the Lesser Antilles. St. Barthelemy was separated from the overseas department of Guadeloupe in 2007. It has a territorial council and executive council, and in 2012 ceased to be part of the European Union.
- Saint Martin, the northern part of the island of Saint Martin in the Lesser Antilles. St. Martin was separated from the overseas department of Guadeloupe in 2007. It has a territorial council and executive council, and with separation remained a part of the European Union.
- Saint Pierre and Miquelon, a group of islands in the Atlantic Ocean off the coast of Newfoundland, Canada. It has a territorial council. It is the last remaining part of New France to be under French rule.
- Wallis and Futuna, three small islands in the Pacific Ocean has a high administrator and territorial assembly.

COM is one possible status in Overseas France, the other inhabited territories are the less-autonomous overseas departments and regions (DROM), and the more-autonomous New Caledonia.

== Former COMs and overseas territories ==
- Mayotte was a COM from 1976 until 31 March 2011, when it became an overseas department.
- New Caledonia was classified as an overseas territory beginning in 1946, but as a result of the 1998 Nouméa Accord, it gained a special status (statut particulier or statut original) in 1999. A New Caledonian citizenship was established, and a gradual transfer of power from the French state to New Caledonia itself was begun, which was due to take from fifteen to twenty years. A series of referendums on further reforms have been held since 2018, with voters choosing to remain part of France, despite unrest.

== Table of overseas collectivities and sui generis collectivity ==
Overseas collectivity	Capital
French Polynesia	Papeete
Saint Barthélemy	Gustavia
Saint Martin	Marigot
Saint Pierre and Miquelon	Saint-Pierre
Wallis and Futuna	Mata Utu

Sui generis collectivity and territory	Capital
French Southern and Antarctic Lands	Saint-Pierre
New Caledonia	Nouméa

== See also ==
- 2009 Mahoran status referendum
- Administrative divisions of France
- Overseas Territories of France (European Parliament constituency)
- Overseas territory
- Special member state territories and the European Union
