= Maore dialect =

Dialect of the Comorian language spoken in Mayotte

Maore
- Shimaore شِمَوُوْرِيْ
- Native to: Mayotte, Madagascar
- Native speakers: 152,000 (2012)
- Language family: Niger–Congo?: Atlantic–Congo; Benue–Congo; Bantoid; Bantu; Northeast Coast Bantu; Sabaki; Comorian; Maore
- Writing system: Latin; Arabic

Language codes
- ISO 639-3: swb
- Glottolog: maor1244
- Guthrie code: G.44d
- ELP: Maore Comorian

Maore Comorian, or Shimaore (French: Mahorais), is one of the two indigenous languages spoken in the French island of Mayotte; Shimaore being a dialect of the Comorian language, while ShiBushi is an unrelated Malayo-Polynesian language originally from Madagascar. Historically, Shimaore- and ShiBushi-speaking villages on Mayotte have been clearly identified, but Shimaore tends to be the de facto indigenous lingua franca in everyday life, because of the larger Shimaore-speaking population. Only Shimaore is represented on the local television news program by Mayotte La Première. The 2002 census references 80,140 speakers of Shimaore in Mayotte itself, to which one would have to add people living outside the island, mostly in metropolitan France. There are also 20,000 speakers of Comorian in Madagascar, of which 3,000 are Shimaore speakers.

The same 2002 census indicates that 37,840 persons responded as knowing how to read or write Shimaore. However this number has to be taken with caution, since it was a few years after this census was taken that a standard writing system was introduced.

From a sociolinguistic perspective, French tends to be regarded by many Shimaore speakers as the language of higher education and prestige, and there is a temptation by native Mahorans to provide an all-French education to their children. This puts a lot of pressure on Shimaore and the language may become endangered in the near future if nothing is done.

Although French remains the official language in Mayotte, Shimaore will probably be taught in Mahoran schools starting in the next few years, and a pilot project began in fall 2004. As in many parts of France where local languages are introduced in the school system, this has led to tensions between partisans of a French-centered education system and administrations, versus those promoting a more diversified approach. Shimaore's position in this regard is however different from other French regions (such as Brittany), since the language is locally spoken by a majority of the population. The project in Mayotte has been inspired by similar projects involving Swahili in eastern Africa countries.

Mayotte is a geographically small territory, but frequent exchanges between villages only began in the last quarter of the twentieth century. As of 2004, linguistic differences between the east and west part of the island, and between the main city of Mamoudzou and the remote villages, are still noticeable, especially when it comes to phonological differences. One typical example is the word u-la ('to eat'), notably pronounced this way in the city due to the influence of a brand of yogurt bearing the same name, but pronounced u-dja in other parts of the island.

== Phonology ==
=== Consonants ===
		Bilabial	Labio- dental	Dental	Alveolar	Retroflex	Palatal	Velar	Glottal
Nasal		m			n		ɲ		
Plosive	voiceless	p			t	ʈ		k	
Plosive	voiced	b			d	ɖ		ɡ	
Plosive	implosive	ɓ			ɗ				
Plosive	voiceless prenasalized	ᵐp							
Plosive	voiced prenasalized	ᵐb			ⁿd	ᶯɖ		ᵑɡ	
Affricate	voiceless				ts		tʃ		
Affricate	voiced				dz		dʒ		
Affricate	voiceless prenasalized				ⁿts				
Affricate	voiced prenasalized				ⁿdz		ᶮdʒ		
Fricative	voiceless		f	θ	s		ʃ		h
Fricative	voiced	β	v	ð	z		ʒ		
Rhotic					r				
Approximant					l		j	w	

This language features an unusual contrast between /w, β, v, b, ɓ/.

=== Vowels ===
	Front	Central	Back
High	i		u
Mid	e		o
Low		a	

This is a basic five-vowel system similar to that of languages such as Spanish.

== Orthography ==
Shimaore was traditionally written with an informal French-based Latin alphabet. On 22 February 2006, the Conseil de la Culture, de l'Éducation et de l'Environnement de Mayotte introduced an official alphabet developed by Association ShiMé that utilizes the basic Latin alphabet without c, q, and x and adds three letters: ɓ, ɗ, and v̄. On 3 March 2020, the Conseil départemental de Mayotte announced the adoption of official orthographies in both Latin and Arabic scripts for Shimaore.

=== Maore Latin Alphabet ===
Shimaore alphabet Alifuɓe ya Shimaore
Letter	A a	B b	Ɓ ɓ Implosive	D d	Ɗ ɗ Implosive	E e	F f	G g	H h	I i	J j	K k	L l	M m	N n	O o	P p	R r	S s	T t	U u	V v	V̄ v̄	W w	Y y	Z z
IPA Value	/a/	/b/	/ɓ/	/d/	/ɗ/	/e/	/f/	/ɡ/	/h/	/i/	/ʒ/	/k/	/l/	/m/	/n/	/o/	/p/	/r/	/s/	/t/	/u/	/v/	/β/	/w/	/j/	/z/

Digraphs/Trigraphs
Letter	Dh, dh	Dj, dj	Dr, dr	Dz, dz	Mb, mb	Mp, mp	Nd, nd	Ndj, ndj	Ndr, ndr	Ndz, ndz	Ng, ng	Nts, nts	Ny, ny	Sh, sh	Th, th	Tr, tr	Ts, ts	Tsh, tsh
IPA Value	/ð/	/d͡ʒ/	/ɖ/	/d͡z/	/ᵐb/	/ᵐp/	/ⁿd/	/ᶮd͡ʒ/	/ᶯɖ/	/ⁿd͡z/	/ᵑɡ/	/ⁿt͡s/	/ɲ/	/ʃ/	/θ/	/ʈ/	/t͡s/	/t͡ʃ/

=== Maore Arabic Alphabet ===
Maore Arabic Alphabet, officially recognized alongside Latin since 2020, consists of 35 letters, of which 27 are from the original Arabic script, and 9 are created for sounds not found in Arabic. However, many of the letters in Maore have a different pronunciation than their Arabic counterpart.

Whereas in Arabic there are 3 vowels, in Maore there are 5. While the common convention in Swahili Ajami orthography has been to use two new diacritics, which are modified varieties of two existing diacritics, in Maore Arabic alphabet, only the 3 original Arabic diacritics are used. Arabic vowels themselves represent vowels [a], [u], and [i].

The vowel [o] is created by adding a waw "و" and a zero-vowel diacritic (sukun) after the consonant.

The vowel [e] is created by adding a ya' "ي" and a zero-vowel diacritic (sukun) after the consonant.

In Maore Arabic Alphabet, (similar to Swahili Ajami Script) stressed syllables are marked, either with alif "ا" (if the vowel of the syllable is [a]), waw "و" (if the vowel of the syllable is [u]), or ya' "ي" (if the vowel of the syllable is [i]). These letters are written with no diacritic, not even zero-vowel diacritic (sukun). (the existence or lack thereof of the zero-vowel diacritic is what distinguishes between [e] and a stressed [i]). This does not apply to stressed syllables containing vowels [o] or [e].

In most cases, the stressed syllable happens to be the one before last.

Whereas in Arabic, the letter ʿayn is used as a pharyngeal consonant, in Maore it has a unique role of being the carrier for nasal vowels. Meaning that with the use of diacritics (and the letter waw "و" and ya' "ي" as needed), nasal vowels are written.

When non-nasal vowels are at the beginning of a word, alif-hamza "أ / إ" is used as a carrier of the appropriate diacritic (followed by the letter waw "و" and ya' "ي" as needed.)

Maore Arabic Alphabet Consonants
Letter	Latin Equivalent	IPA	Example	Latin spelling	Meaning
أ، إ	-	[ʔ]	سُألَ	suala	question
ب	Ɓ ɓ	[ɓ]	بَهَاتِ	ɓahati	chance
ٻ	‌B b	[b]	ٻِيْنْڠَانِ	bengani	eggplant
پ	‌P p	[p]	پَارِيْ	parè	route
ت	‌T t	[t]	تِبَاكُ	tiɓaku	tobacco
ث	‌Th th	[θ]	ثَوَابُ	thawaɓu	religious/spiritual reward
ج	‌Dj dj	[dʒ]	جَوَابُ	djawabu	response, answer
چ	‌J j	[ʒ]	چِيْچِيْ	jeje	"How is it going?"
خ	Kh kh	[χ]	خَلِيفَ	khalifa	successor/ruler
د	D d	[d]	دَامُ	damu	blood
ذ	Dh dh	[ð]	ذَهَابُ	dhahabu	gold
ډ	Ɗ ɗ	[ɗ]	ډُوْمُوْ	ɗomo	lip
ڍ	Dy dy	[ʄ]	أُڍَا	udya	to eat
ر	R r	[r]	رُوْهُوْ	roho	heart
ز	Z z	[z]	زُوزِ	zuzi	day before yesterday
س	S s	[s]	سِمْٻَ	simba	lion
ش	Sh sh	[ʃ]	شَمْٻَ	shamba	cultivated land
ص	Sw sw	[sw]	صَلَا	swala	salah/prayer
ض	Dw dw	[dw]	ضَرُورَ	dwarura	urgency/emergency
ط	Tw tw	[tw]	طَرِيكَ	twarika	religious brotherhood
ظ	Dhw dhw	[ðw]	ظَاهِرِ	dhwàhiri	visible
غ	Gh gh H h	[ɣ]	غَالِ	hali	expensive
ڠ	G g	[g]	ڠَارِ	gari	car
ف	F f	[f]	فِيجُو	fidjo	sound
ڤ	V v	[v]	ڤُوَ	vua	rain
ݡ	Bv bv V̄ v̄	[β]	ݡُوْلِيْݡُوْلِيْ	Bvolebvole	gently/softly
ك	K k	[k]	كَامْبَا	kamba	lobster
ل	L l	[l]	لِيْوُوْ	leo	today
م	M m	[m]	مَاتْرَا	matrà	oil
ن	N n	[n]	نَادْزِي	nadzì	coconut
ڼ	Ny ny	[ɲ]	ڼَامَ	nyama	meat
و	W w	[w]	وَاوِيْ	wawe	you
ه / هـ	H h	[h]	هَازِ	hazi	work/function
ي	Y y	[j]	يِيْزِ	yezi	power

Maore Arabic Digraphs/Trigraphs
Letter	Latin Equivalent	IPA	Example	Latin spelling	Meaning
تْر	Tr tr	[tr]	تْرَمْبُوْ	trambo	lie/deceit
تْس	Ts ts	[ts]	تْسِنْڠُوْ	tsingo	elbow
تْش	Tsh tsh	[tʃ]	تْشُوْرَ	tshora	spear
دْر	Dr dr	[dr]	دْرَادْرَاكَ	dradraka	crab
دْز	Dz dz	[dz]	دْزِنْدْزَانُوْ	dzindzano	yellow
مْٻ	Mb mb	[ᵐb]	مْٻِيَ	mbia	grain
مْپ	Mp mp	[ᵐp]	مْپِيَ	mpia	new
نْتْس	Nts nts	[ⁿts]	فَرَنْتْسَا	Farantsa	France
نْج	Ndj ndj	[ᶮd͡ʒ]	نْجِيْمَ	ndjema	good/nice
نْد	Nd nd	[ⁿd]	نْدُوْڤُ	ndovu	elephant
نْدْر	Ndr ndr	[ᶯɖ]	نْدْرَا	ndra	louse (lice)
نْدْز	Ndz ndz	[ⁿd͡z]	نْدْزَا	ndza	hunger
نْڠ	Ng ng	[ᵑɡ]	نْڠُوْمَ	ngoma	drum
نْي	Ny ny	[ɲ]	نْيَامَ	nyama	meat

Vowel as first sound of word
A	E	I	O	U
أَ	إِيْـ / إِيْ	إِ	أُوْ	أُ
‌أَدَابُ adabu politeness	‌إِيْوَا ewa yes	‌إِينَا ina henna	‌أُوْكْتُوْٻْرُ Oktobru; October	‌أُسُبُوتُ usuɓutu to defy

Simple Vowels
-a	-e	-i	-o	-u
◌َ	◌ِيْـ / ◌ِيْ	◌ِ	◌ُوْ	◌ُ

Simple Vowels in a stressed syllable
-a	-e	-i	-o	-u
◌َا	◌ِيْـ / ◌ِيْ	◌ِيـ / ◌ِي	◌ُوْ	◌ُو

Nasal Vowels
Ã -ã	Ẽ -ẽ	Ĩ -ĩ	Õ -õ	Ũ -ũ
عَـ / عَ	عِيْـ / عِيْ	عِـ / عِ	عُوْ	عُـ / عُ
أَنْـ / أَنْ ◌َانْـ / ◌َانْ	إِيْنْـ / إِيْنْ ◌ِيْنْـ / ◌ِيْنْ	إِنْـ / إِنْ ◌ِنْـ / ◌ِنْ	أُوْنْـ / أُوْنْ ◌ُوْنْـ / ◌ُوْنْ	أُنْـ / أُنْ ◌ُنْـ / ◌ُنْ

== Grammar ==
=== Noun classes ===
zi-mbuzi z-angu z-endr-e ɓazari
CL10.DEF-goat CL10-AGR-my CL10.SM-go-VH.RET market
'My goats went to the market.'

wa-ntru-washe wa-raru wa-ngu
CL2-person-female CL2.AGR-three CL2.AGR-my
'my three wives' (Rombi 1983: 123)

== See also ==
- Languages of Mayotte

== Bibliography ==
- Blanchy, Sophie (1987). L'interprète. Dictionnaire Mahorais - Français et Français - Mahorais. CMAC, Mayotte. L'Harmattan, Paris.
- Cornice, Abdillahi D. (1999). Manuel grammatical de shimaore. Mamoudzou, Mayotte: L'Association SHIME - Le SHImaorais MEthodique.
- Johansen Alnet, Aimee (2009). The clause structure of the Shimaore dialect of Comorian (Bantu). Ph.D thesis. University of Illinois at Urbana-Champaign, Urbana, Illinois.
- Kordji, Chamsidine, Martine Jaquin, et alia (1999). Narifundrihe shimaore - Apprenons le shimaore. Association SHIME, Mamoudzou.
- Maandhui, Ousseni (1996). Parlons Shimaore. Editions du Baobab, Mamoudzou.
- Rombi, Marie-Françoise (1983). Le Shimaore (Île de Mayotte, Comores): Première approche d'un parler de la langue comorienne. Paris: Société d'Etudes Linguistiques et Anthropologiques de France (SELAF).
