= Volontaire Civil à l'Aide Technique =

Volontaire Civil à lAide Technique (VCAT) is a voluntary service in the French overseas territories for citizens from France, citizens of other EU member states or citizens of countries belonging to the European Economic Area.
