= Departmental collectivity =

Departmental collectivity (French: collectivité départementale) was a legal designation used to describe the particular status of the French overseas collectivity of Mayotte between 2001 and 2011. The term is used to indicate that Mayotte at the time was similar to a French department but not yet an overseas department. The term was made official by Law No. 2001-616 on 11 July 2001. Mayotte became a department in 2011.
