= Swahili Ajami =

Arabic script for Swahili

Swahili Ajami herufi za Kiarabu حٖرُوفِ زَ كِعَرَبُ
- Script type: Abjad
- Period: c. 16 c. to the present
- Direction: Right-to-left
- Languages: Swahili

Related scripts
- Parent systems: Proto-Sinaitic: Phoenician; Aramaic; Nabataean; Arabic; Swahili Ajami

The Swahili Ajami script refers to the alphabet derived from the Arabic script that is used for the writing of the Swahili language.

Ajami is a name commonly given to alphabets derived from Arabic script for the use of various African languages, from Swahili to Hausa, Fula, and Wolof.

In the 2010s, there has been work on creating new Unicode characters, on keyboard mapping, and on coding script conversion programs, so that typing in Swahili Ajami Script can become as accessible as typing in Latin Script, so that texts from either script can easily and accurately be converted to the other, and to have a tool digitize and upload historic texts and manuscripts in Swahili for the sake of their preservation. Dr. Kevin Donnelly of SOAS has worked on that and on digitizing historic Swahili manuscripts.

== History ==
Up until the latter half of the 19th century, there was no specific "Swahili script". Instead, the Arabic script with no modification was used.

=== Adapting the Arabic script to Swahili phonology ===
Starting from the beginning of the Islamization of the Swahili coast, continuing into the 20th century, and going on in the 21st century, a process of "Swahilization" of the Arabic script has been under way by Swahili scribes and scholars. The first systematic attempt was done by Mwalimu Sikujua, a scholar and poet from Mombasa, who built upon the centuries of Arabic script use in the region. Below are Mwalimu Sikujua's innovations in the adaptation of Arabic script for Swahili phonology:

1. In his script, he distinguished alveolar [t] and [d] sounds from their dental counterparts which is the norm in Arabic phonology. He did so by adding 4 dots to the letters tāʼ (ت) and dāl (د), creating the letters ٿ and ڐ. This is the same as what was done in Urdu alphabet to denote retroflex consonants, where later, the 4 dots evolved into looking like the letter ṭāʾ (ط)
2. The introduction of new letters to represent the sounds [p] and [v] by adding three dots to letters bāʼ (ب) and fāʼ (ف), same as what has been done in Persian alphabet, creating the letters پ and ڤ.
3. For representing aspirated consonants, Mwalimu Sikujua wrote a tiny letter hāʾ (ھ) on top of the aspirated letter. For example, an aspirated alveolar [t] would be written with ه on top of the four dots of the letter ٿ, producing "ٿ(ه)".
4. For representing prenasalized consonants (sounds such as [ⁿd], [ᵑɡ], and [ᵐb]), Mwalimu Sikujua wrote a tiny letter mīm (م) or nūn (ن) on top or bottom of the letter. For example, the sound [ᵐb] would be written as "بۭ" and the sound [ⁿd] as "دۨ".
5. As explained, Arabic only has vowels for [a], [i], and [u], whereas Swahili has five vowels, the three aforementioned ones and [e] and [o]. For showing the vowel [e], Mwalimu Sikujua modified the existing Kasrah diacritic used for showing [i] (◌ِ), by changing its angle slightly and by adding markings to modify its shape slightly, thus producing a shape resembling "◌̼ ". As for [o], Mwalimu Sikujua inverted the orientation of the existing Ḍammah diacritic used for showing u (◌ؙ), thus representing it with a diacritic resembling "◌ٗ".

The poetry and texts written by Mwalimu Sikujua were published by W.E. Taylor, a Swahili literature scholar of British origin, in the late 19th century. This might mark the first instance of Swahili in Ajami script being printed and published as opposed to being handwritten. However, the spread of a standardized indigenous variation of Arabic script for Swahili was hampered by the colonial takeover of East Africa by the United Kingdom and Germany. The usage of Arabic script was suppressed in German East Africa and to a lesser extent in British East Africa. Nevertheless, well into the 1930s and 1940s, rural literacy rate in Arabic script as well as a local preference to write Swahili in this script was high. Literacy at the time was in unmodified Arabic script, and not the modified scripts that were thus far proposed by the likes of Mwalimu Sikujua.

In the mid 1940s, 3 prominent Swahili literature scholars of British origin noted on the writing of Swahili in the urban centre of Mombasa. They noted that at the time, a standardized reformed Arabic script had been adopted by writers of the city. While they only made use of the three original vowels, they had consistency in indicating the stressed syllable by writing Arabic long vowels using alif, wāw, and yāʼ (ا, و , ی). Colonial administrators as well as prominent Swahili scholars, despite recognizing the need for implementation of reform in the script, citing local opposition and conservativity, were anxious to do so and impose it on the populace in a top-down manner.

=== Competing standards of the Swahili language ===
The process of standardization of Swahili Ajami script continued into the 20th century. However, scholars did not always follow or propose the same standard. For example, Hajj Nur b. Muhammad Hajj Nur, being from Barawa in Somalia, worked based on the local Chimbalazi dialect of Swahili. In his proposal, he maintained the use of tiny letters for representing prenasalized consonants just as Mwalimu Sikujua had done. Whereas, Mu’allim Sheikh Yahya Ali Omar from Mombasa decided to do what is done in the Latin script, namely to just write the letters mīm (م) or nūn (ن) as part of the word. For example, the number two (mbili) will be written as مبِيلِ and بِۘيلِ respectively in either standard.

Furthermore, on top of orthographic variations, it is noteworthy to mention the dialectical variation within Swahili. Traditionally, dialects from Lamu (on the Kenyan Coast) have been the basis for Swahili literary heritage and dominate Swahili poetry. This dialect was the basis for the Swahili Ajami script. However, this came to be challenged by the Kiunguja dialect of Zanzibar City. This dialect was used by Christian missionaries and British colonial officials as the basis for the Latin Script.

In the most recent and most widely acknowledged orthographic standard, devised by Mu’allim Sheikh Yahya Ali Omar, the dialect of his hometown Mombasa has been chosen as the basis. This is, according to Yahya Ali Omar himself, because this dialect has historically been affected by all vernacular varieties of Swahili and it has formed the basis of literary Swahili. This dialect is in his opinion, best fitted for accurate Swahili prose.

== Alphabet and orthographic convention ==
=== Letters ===
Letters in Yahya Ali Omar's orthography are based on the dialect of Mombasa. There are several consonants that represent sounds present in Mombasan dialect but not necessarily elsewhere in the Swahili-speaking world. There are 48 consonants in Swahili Ajami. Digraphs are counted as separate letters.

Although the Roman orthography does not distinguish between syllabicity and prenasalized sounds, both Sheikh Yahya's manuscripts and Yahya Omar's convention make a distinction between a syllabic nasal followed by a voiced plosive (e.g. [m̩ɓ]) and a prenasalised voiced plosive (e.g. [ᵐb]). Both of these are written as mb in Roman orthography. The former is seen in Swahili noun class 1 (the M-wa class), and the first letter of the word is written as mīm (م), such as mbrazil مْبرَزِل (Brazilian person). The later is seen in Swahili noun class 9. For this class, in Roman script, either a prefix of m or n is used, reflecting pronunciation. In Ajami script, nūn (ن) is used all the time, reflecting grammatical consistency. An example being mbazi نْبَازِ (beans).

Aspirated as opposed to non-aspirated consonants are also marked in Swahili Ajami, with a "two-eyed" hāʾ (ھ) similar to what has been done in the Urdu alphabet. This is not indicated in Swahili Roman script.

Dental as opposed to alveolar [t] and [d] consonants, sounds unique to Mombasa Swahili, are also marked in Swahili Ajami. The dental forms are represented with Arabic letters tāʼ (ت) for [t̪] and dāl (د) for [d̪], whereas the alveolar ones are represented with unique letters, similar in shape to Urdu letters Ṭe (ٹ) for [t] and Ḍal (ڈ) for [d]. Dental versus alveolar [t] and [d] are not distinguished in Swahili Roman orthography, nor in unmodified Arabic script.

Unfortunately, online script conversion tools are unable to distinguish between the above nuances unique to Ajami script, and they render all text as they would correspond to Roman. Manual editing of text will be required.

Swahili Ajami Letters
Name	Forms				Sound represented	Roman equivalent	Example			Notes
Name	Isolated	Final	Medial	Initial	Sound represented	Roman equivalent	Ajami	Roman	Meaning	Notes
alifu أَلِيفُ	ا	ـا		ا	/a/	a	أَنَسٖيمَ سَاسَ ڤِازِ	anasema sasa viazi	he is speaking now potatoes	The alifu has two functions: first, to indicate the vowel [a] when stressed; second, to be the carrier of the hamzah as word initial and at vowel sequences.
bee بٖئٖ	ب	ـب	ـبـ	بـ	/ɓ/	b	بُويُ مْبرَزِل	buyu mbrazil	fruit Brazilian person	
mbee نْبٖئٖ	نْب	ـنْب	ـنْبـ	نْبـ	/ᵐb/	b	نْبٖيلٖ	mbele	in front	Not applicable to Swahili noun class 1 (the M-wa class) and other instances of syllabic "mb" consonant sequence. (meaning instances when "mb" is pronounced as [m̩ɓ] as opposed to [ᵐb])
pee پٖئٖ	پ	ـپ	ـپـ	پـ	/p/	p	ݒَنْدَ	panda	climb	
p'ee پھٖئٖ	پْھ	ـپْھ	ـپْھـ	پْھـ	/pʰ/	p	پْھَاكَ	paka	cat	Not distinguished from [p] in Roman orthography.
tee تٖئٖ	ت	ـت	ـتـ	تـ	/t̪/	t	هَتُؤَ	hatua	action	Dental [t].
t'ee تھٖئٖ	تْھ	ـتْھ	ـتْھـ	تْھـ	/t̪ʰ/	t	تْھُوپَ	tupa	bottle	Dental aspirated [t]. Not distinguished from [t̪], [t], or [tʰ] in Roman orthography.
tee ٹٖئٖ	ٹ	ـٹ	ـٹـ	ٹـ	/t/	t	ٹُونْڈُ	tundu	chicken coop	Alveolar [t], unique to Mombasa Dialect. Not distinguished from [t̪], [t̪ʰ], or [tʰ] in Roman orthography.
t'ee ٹھٖئٖ	ٹھ	ـٹھ	ـٹھـ	ٹھـ	/tʰ/	t	ٹھُونْدُ	tundu	a hole	Alveolar aspirated [t], unique to Mombasa Dialect. Not distinguished from [t̪], [t̪ʰ], or [t] in Roman orthography.
thee ثٖئٖ	ث	ـث	ـثـ	ثـ	/θ/	th	ثٖمَنِينِ	themanini	eighty	
jimu جِيمُ	ج	ـج	ـجـ	جـ	/ʄ/~/dʒ/	j	جَانَ	jana	yesterday	
njimu نْجِيمُ	نْج	ـنْج	ـنْجـ	نْجـ	/ⁿd̥ʒ̊/	nj	نْجٖيمَ	njema	good	
chimu چِيمُ	چ	ـچ	ـچـ	چـ	/tʃ/	ch	چُونْڠوَ	chungwa	orange	Historically, some manuscripts used kafu with two dots ػ as well.
ch'imu چھِيمُ	چھ	ـچھ	ـچھـ	چھـ	/tʃʰ/	ch	چھُونْڠوَ	ch'ungwa	medium-sized orange	Not distinguished from [tʃ] in Roman orthography.
hee حٖئٖ	ح	ـح	ـحـ	حـ	/h/	h	حَسَن وَسوَحِيلِ	hasan waswahili	Name "Hasan"; Swahili people	Only used in loanwords from Arabic. As the original Arabic pronunciation does not exist in Swahili phonology, Swahili speakers pronounce it as [h].
khee خٖئٖ	خ	ـخ	ـخـ	خـ	/χ/~/h/	h (kh)	خَبَارِ	habari	news	Only used in loanwords from Arabic. Most Swahili speakers pronounce it as [h].
dali دَالِ	د	ـد		د	/d̪/	d	دَنْڠَانْيَ	danganya	deceive	Dental [d].
ndali نْدَالِ	نْد	ـنْد		نْد	/ⁿd̪/	nd	مْوٖينْدٖ	mwenḏe	go	Prenasalized Dental [nd].
dali ڈَالِ	ڈ	ـڈ		ڈ	/d/	d	ڈُو	du	Large bucket	Alveolar [d], unique to Mombasa Dialect. Not distinguished from [d̪] in Roman orthography.
ndali نْڈَالِ	نْڈ	ـنْڈ		نْڈ	/d/	d	نْڈَانِ	ndani	Inside	Prenasalized Alveolar [d], unique to Mombasa Dialect. Not distinguished from [nd̪] in Roman orthography.
dhali ذَالِ	ذ	ـذ		ذ	/ð/	dh	ذَهَابُ	dhahabu	gold	
ree رٖئٖ	ر	ـر		ر	/ɾ/	r	رُنِنْڠَ	runinga	television	
zee زٖئٖ	ز	ـز		ز	/z/	z	زُنْڠُكَ	zunguka	to wander	
zhee ژٖئٖ	ژ	ـژ		ژ	/ʒ/	zh	ژِينَ	Zhina	Personal name "Zhina"	Nonexistent in most Swahili dialects and in most literature. Only seen in vernacular of Northern dialects.
sini سِينِ	س	ـس	ـسـ	سـ	/s/	s	كُسِكِئَ	kusikia	to hear	
shini شِينِ	ش	ـش	ـشـ	شـ	/ʃ/	sh	كُشِيكَ	kushika	to hold	
sadi صَادِ	ص	ـص	ـصـ	صـ	/s/	s	صَحِيبُ	sahibu	friend	Only used in loanwords from Arabic. Most Swahili speakers pronounce it as [s].
dhadi ضَادِ	ض	ـض	ـضـ	ضـ	/ð/	dh	ضِيكِ	dhiki	distress	Only used in loanwords from Arabic. Swahili speakers pronounce it as [dh].
tee طٖئٖ	ط	ـط	ـطـ	طـ	/t/	t	كُطَهِرِيشَ	kutahirisha	to purify	Only used in loanwords from Arabic. Swahili speakers pronounce it as [t].
dhee ظٖئٖ	ظ	ـظ	ـظـ	ظـ	/ð/	dh	أَظُهُورِ	adhuhuri	noon	Only used in loanwords from Arabic. Swahili speakers pronounce it as [dh].
aini عَئِينِ	ع	ـع	ـعـ	عـ	/-/ (/ʕ/)	-	مَعَانَ	maana	meaning	Only used in loanwords from Arabic. Not pronounced in Swahili. Vowel sequences in Roman orthography can correspond to this letter.
ghaini غَئِينِ	غ	ـغ	ـغـ	غـ	/ɣ/	gh	غَفلَ	ghafla	suddenly	
gaini ڠَئِينِ	ڠ	ـڠ	ـڠـ	ڠـ	/ɠ/~/ɡ/	g	ڠُنِئَ	gunia	sack	
ngaini نْڠَئِينِ	نْڠ	ـنْڠ	ـنْڠـ	نْڠـ	/ᵑɡ/	ng	مْچَانْڠَ	mchanga	sand	
ng'aini نݝَئِينِ	نݝ	ـنݝ	ـنݝـ	نݝـ	/ŋ/	ng'	نݝٗومْبٖ	ng'ombe	cattle	
fee فٖئٖ	ف	ـف	ـفـ	فـ	/f/	f	فِيڠٗ	figo	kidney	
vee ڤٖئٖ	ڤ	ـڤ	ـڤـ	ڤـ	/v/	v	ڤُنْبِ	vumbi	dust	
qafu قَافُ	ق	ـق	ـقـ	قـ	/q/	q	وَقفُ	waqfu	endowment	Only used in loanwords from Arabic. Swahili speakers pronounce it as [k].
kafu كَافُ	ك	ـك	ـكـ	كـ	/k/	k	كُوكُ	kuku	large hen	
k'afu كھَافُ	كھ	ـكھ	ـكھـ	كھـ	/kʰ/	k	كھُوكُ	k'uku	medium-sized hen	Not distinguished from [k] in Roman orthography.
lamu لَامُ	ل	ـل	ـلـ	لـ	/l/	l	لَݒَ	lapa	slippers	
mimu مِيمُ	م	ـم	ـمـ	مـ	/m/	m	مِيمِ	mimi	I (first person singular pronoun)	
nuni نُونِ	ن	ـن	ـنـ	نـ	/n/	n	نَانِ	nani	who?	
waw وَو	و	ـو		و	/ʋ/~/w/ /ɔ/ /u/	w o u	كُوَ مْكٗونْڠَ كُسُڠُؤَ	kuwa mkonga kusugua	to be elephant trunk to rub	The waw has three functions: first, to be a consonant, represented in Roman orthography as [w]. Second is to indicate the vowels [o] or [u] when stressed; third, to be the carrier of the hamzah at vowel sequences.
hee هٖئٖ	ه	ـه	ـهـ	هـ	/h/	h	هَيُوپٗ	hayupo	he/she is not there	
hamza هَامزَ	ء	ـاء ـؤ ـئ	ـأ ـؤ ـئـ	أ إ	-	-	إٖنْدٖلٖئَ كُسُڠُؤَ مَفَاءَ	endelea kusugua mafaa	go on to rub usefulness	Hamza is used in conjunction with either alif, waw, or yee as its carrier as word initial and at vowel sequences.
yee يٖئٖ	ي	ـي	ـيـ	يـ	/j/ /ɛ/ /i/	y e i	يَاكٗ كٖلٖيلٖ	yako kelele	your scream	The yee has two functions: first, to be a consonant, represented in Roman orthography as [y]. Second is to indicate the vowels [e] or [i] when stressed. A dotless letter yee is used as the carrier of the hamzah at vowel sequences.
nyee نْيٖئٖ	نْي	ـنْي	ـنْيـ	نْيـ	/ɲ/	ny	نْيٗوكَ	nyoka	snake	

=== General conventions ===
Vowel diacritics in Swahili Ajami
-a	-e	-i	-o	-u
◌َ	◌ٖ	◌ِ	◌ٗ	◌ُ
fataha فَتَاحَ	kasiri ya kusimama كَسِيرِ يَ كُسِمَامَ	kasiri كَسِيرِ	dhuma ya kupindua ضُومَ يَ كُپِنْدُؤَ	dhuma ضُومَ

However, these diacritics cannot be written on their own and independent of a letter. When a word begins with a vowel, a letter alifu is used as the carrier, with a hamza on the top (for [a], [u], [o]) or on the bottom (for [e], [i]). The writing of Hamza in handwriting is optional.

Vowel as first sound of word
A	E	I	O	U
أَ	إٖ	إِ	أٗ	أُ

In Swahili Ajami, vowels in the middle of the word are shown differently depending on whether the syllable is stressed or unstressed. In Swahili, stress patterns are predictable, as almost always they fall on the second-to-last syllable of a word. The exceptions to this rule are extremely rare, and are usually found in words borrowed from other languages, mostly Arabic (for example, maalum).

Vowels in unstressed syllables
-a	-e	-i	-o	-u
◌َ	◌ٖ	◌ِ	◌ٗ	◌ُ

Vowels in stressed (second-to-last) syllable of the word are marked with diacritic as well as a carrier letter, namely alifu (ا) for vowel [a], yee (ي) for vowels [e] and [i], and waw (و) for vowels [o] and [u]. The diacritic for the vowels [a], [i], or [u] can be omitted, but this is not recommended. This practice of indicating the stressed syllable also helps to delimit individual words in the Ajami script.

Vowels in stressed (second-to-last) syllable
-a	-e	-i	-o	-u
◌َا	◌ٖي	◌ِي	◌ٗو	◌ُو

Below are some sample words where the above principles can be observed.

Ajami	Latin	Meaning
أَنَسٖيمَ	anasema	he is speaking
أٗكتٗوبَ	oktoba	October
أُڠَالِ	ugali	porridge
إٖلٖكٖيڤُ	elekevu	reasonable
كِسوَحِيلِ	kiswahili	Swahili language

=== Vowel sequences ===
In Swahili Ajami script, to denote vowel sequences, hamza and either alifu (ا), yee (ي), or waw (و) are used. There are different conventions depending on whether the vowel sequence occurs in the middle of the word or at the end of the word.

If the vowel sequence occurs in the middle of the word:

- if the second vowel of the sequence is [a]
  - if the first vowel of the sequence is also [a], an alifu-hamza letter (أ) is used and the [a] diacritic (◌َ) is placed on it.
  - if the first vowel of the sequence is [e] or [i], a yee-hamza letter (ئ) is used and the [a] diacritic (◌َ) is placed on it.
  - if the first vowel of the sequence is [o] or [u], a waw-hamza letter (ؤ) is used and the [a] diacritic (◌َ) is placed on it.
- if the second vowel of the sequence is [e] or [i], a yee-hamza letter (ئ) is used and the [e] or [i] dacritic, (◌ٖ) or (◌ِ), is placed on it.
- if the second vowel of the sequence is [o] or [u], a waw-hamza letter (ؤ) is used and the [o] or [u] dacritic, (◌ٗ) or (◌ُ), is placed on it.

And in addition to above conventions, if the second syllable in the vowel sequence is the stressed (second-to-last) syllable of the word, alifu (ا), yee (ي), or waw (و) are also written in correspondence with the vowel of the syllable.

Below are some sample words where the above principles can be observed.

Ajami	Latin	Meaning
مَأَنْدِيشِ	maandishi	manuscripts
ڤِئَازِ	viazi	potatoes
كُؤَنْدِيكَ	kuandika	to write
شَئِيرِ	shairi	poetry
كِئِينِ	kiini	pith
كُئِيتَ	kuita	to call
شَؤُورِ	shauri	advice
مٖؤُوپٖ	meupe	White (class 6)
كُؤٗونَ	kuona	to see

If the vowel sequence occurs at the end of the word, meaning that the first syllable in the sequence is the stressed syllable of the word:

- if the first vowel of the sequence is [a], an alifu letter marking the stressed syllable followed by a hamza (اء) is used and the hamza is marked with one of the five diacritics.
- if the first vowel of the sequence is [e] or [i], a yee-hamza letter (ئ) is used and is marked with one of the five diacritics. There no longer is a need to add a yee letter (ي) to mark the stressed syllable; an example being كُپٗكٖئَ (kupokea, to receive).
- if the first vowel of the sequence is [o] or [u], a waw-hamza letter (ؤ) is used and is marked with one of the five diacritics. There no longer is a need to add a waw letter (و) to mark the stressed syllable; an example being كُپٗؤَ (kupoa, to cool).

Below are some sample words where the above principles can be observed.

Ajami	Latin	Meaning
مَفَاءَ	mafaa	usefulness
تَاءِ	tai	vulture
بَاءٗ	bao	board
كُپٗكٖئَ	kupokea	to receive
كُتِئَ	kutia	to place
كُپٗؤَ	kupoa	to call
كُسُڠُؤَ	kusugua	to rub

== Text samples ==
Article 1 of the Universal Declaration of Human Rights:

Translation	Latin Script	Swahili Ajami Script
All human beings are born free, (sic) there are equal status and rights. They are endowed with reason and conscience and should act towards one another in a spirit of brotherhood.	Watu wote wamezaliwa huru, hadhi na haki zao ni sawa. Wote wamejaliwa akili na dhamiri, hivyo yapasa watendeane kindugu.	وَاتُ وٗوتٖ وَمٖزَلِيوَ حُورُ، هَاذِ نَ حَقِ زَاءٗ نِ سَاوَ. وٗوتٖ وَمٖجَلِيوَ عَقِيلِ نَ ضَمِيرِ، هِيڤْيٗ يَپَاسَ وَتٖنْدٖئَانٖ كِنْدُوڠُ.

A prose by Yahya Ali Omar

Translation	Latin Script	Swahili Ajami Script
... All of a sudden we saw a very high mountain which blocked the road. So we climbed the mountain: its sand was like gold, and its stones were like rubies and seed-pearls. Well then, as we continued on our way, we came across a tree the like of which I had never before seen. Beneath it was a youth tending goats. The horns of those goats were green like emeralds, and their silken fleeces were of divers colours, while their milk which dripped down was as white as the milk of the rivers of Paradise.	... Mara tukaona mlima unkingama ndiyani, mrefu sana. Tukapanda; mtanga wake ni wa dhahabu na mawe yake ni yakuti na marjani. Basi tukatika kwenda, mara tukaona mti, sijaona mfano wake. T'ini yake kuna barobaro mmoja atunga mbuzi, na hao mbuzi p'embe zao ni za zumurudi ya kijani kibiti; na manyowa yao ni hariri ya rangi kulla namna; maziwa yawatumzika, meupe kama maziwa ya mito ya P'eponi.	... مَارَ ٹُكَؤٗونَ مْلِيمَ أُنْكِنْڠَامَ نْدِيَانِ، مْرٖيفُ سَانَ. ٹُكَپَانْدَ، مْتَانْڠَ وَاكٖ نِ وَ ذَهَابُ نَ مَاوٖ يَاكٖ نِ يَكُوتِ نَ مَرجَانِ. بَاسِ ٹُكَٹِيكَ كْوٖينْدَ، مَارَ ٹُكَؤٗونَ مْٹِ، سِجَؤٗونَ مْفَانٗ وَاكٖ. تْھِينِ يَاكٖ كُونَ بَرٗبَارٗ مْمٗوجَ أَتُونْڠَ نْبُوزِ، نَ هَاءٗ نْبُوزِ پْھٖيمْبٖ زَاءٗ نِ زَ زُمُرُودِ يَ كِجَانِ كِبِيتِ، نَ مَنْيٗوَ يَاءٗ نِ حَرِيرِ يَ رَانْڠِ كُلَّ نَامْنَ، مَزِيوَ يَوَتُرُزِيكَ، مٖؤُوپٖ كَمَا مَزِيوَ يَ مِيٹٗ يَ پْھٖپٗونِ.
