= Île de l'Est =

One of the Crozet Islands

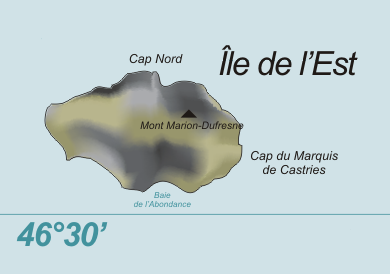
- Map of the island
- Interactive map of Île de l'Est

Geography
- Coordinates: 46°25′48″S 52°12′27″E
- Archipelago: Crozet Islands
- Area: 130 km^{2} (50 sq mi)
- Length: 18 km (11.2 mi)
- Width: 8 km (5 mi)
- Highest elevation: 1,050 m (3440 ft)
- Highest point: Mont Marion-Dufresne

Administration
- France

Demographics
- Population: 0

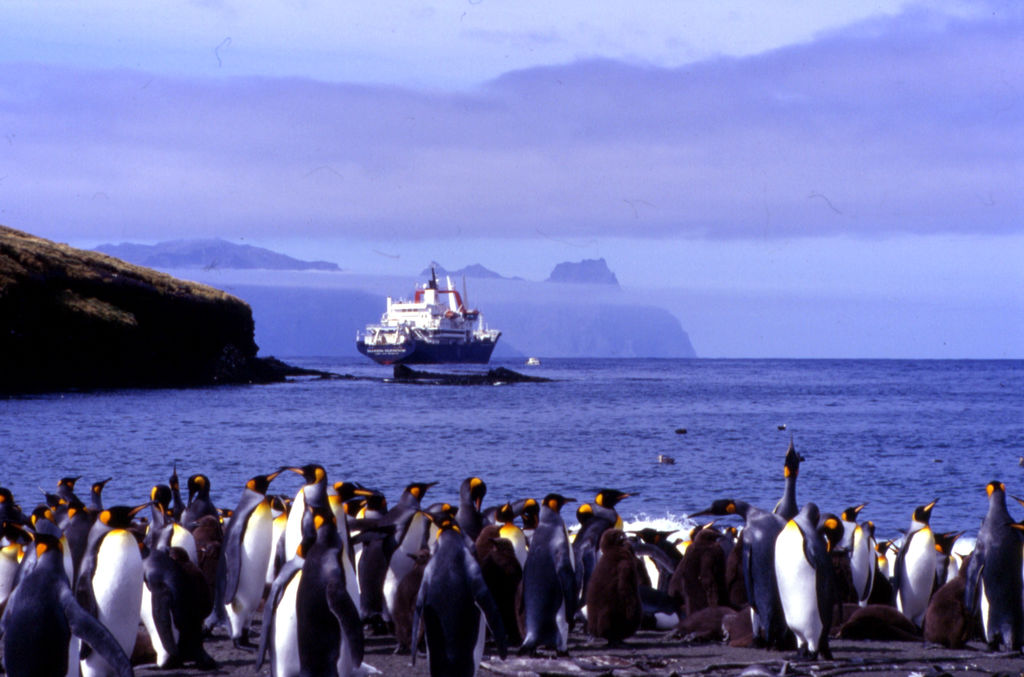
View of East Island (background) from king penguin colony on Possession Island, with the ship Marion Dufresne

Île de l'Est (French pronunciation: [il də lɛst]), or East Island, is a part of the subantarctic archipelago of the Crozet Islands. With an area of 130 km^{2} (50 sq mi) it is the second largest island of the group. It is part of the French Southern and Antarctic Lands.

== Description ==
The island is the easternmost of the archipelago, lying about 20 kilometres (12 mi) east of Île de la Possession (Possession Island). The landscape is mainly bare rock; it is the most mountainous in the archipelago, with a high point of 1,050 metres (3,440 ft), and a rugged coastline of high cliffs. It is dissected by several steep-sided valleys of glacial origin. The only introduced animals are rabbits. There is no human infrastructure; it is only occasionally visited by researchers.

== History ==
East Island was discovered on January 24, 1772, by the French expedition led by Marc-Joseph Marion Dufresne, who named it île Aride (Arid Island).

The island was visited from the early 19th century by seal hunters, primarily from Great Britain and New England (USA). A carved stone bearing the name Henry Kennedy and the date December 21, 1806, was found there.

The most famous castaway is Guillaume Lesquin, a native of Roscoff, Brittany, France, who, at the age of 22, shipwrecked on July 29, 1825, with a crew reduced to six others from the ship L'Aventure (the rest of the crew, nine sailors, were landed on Pig Island and rescued later). They wrecked on the aptly named Shipwreck Beach on the island’s northern coast, which Lesquin named Chabrol Island. Rescued on January 6, 1827, by the British ship Cape Packet, Guillaume Lesquin returned to France on May 7, 1827. In July, he shared his ordeal with the readers of Lycée Armoricain.

East Island is uninhabited and designated as part of the French Southern and Antarctic Lands (TAAF) Natural Park.

== Important Bird Area ==
The island has been identified as an Important Bird Area (IBA) by BirdLife International as a breeding site for seabirds. Key species include king, gentoo, macaroni and northern rockhopper penguins, wandering, grey-headed, light-mantled, sooty and black-browed albatrosses, both northern and southern giant petrels, medium-billed and fairy prions, great-winged, soft-plumaged, white-chinned, grey, blue and Kerguelen petrels, Wilson's, grey-backed and black-bellied storm petrels, common and South Georgia diving petrels, Crozet blue-eyed shags, brown skuas and Kerguelen terns. Eaton's pintails are present. The island is also the site of the largest breeding population of southern elephant seals in the archipelago.

== See also ==
- List of Antarctic islands north of 60° S
