= Mascarin =

Mascarin may refer to:

- Conservatoire botanique national de Mascarin, a national conservatory and botanical garden
- Mascarene parrot (Mascarinus mascarin), of Réunion in the Indian Ocean
- Mascarin Peak, the highest mountain on Marion Island
- Pic du Mascarin, a mountain in the Crozet Islands
- Susan Mascarin (born 1964), American tennis player
