= Pic du Mascarin =

Mountain in France

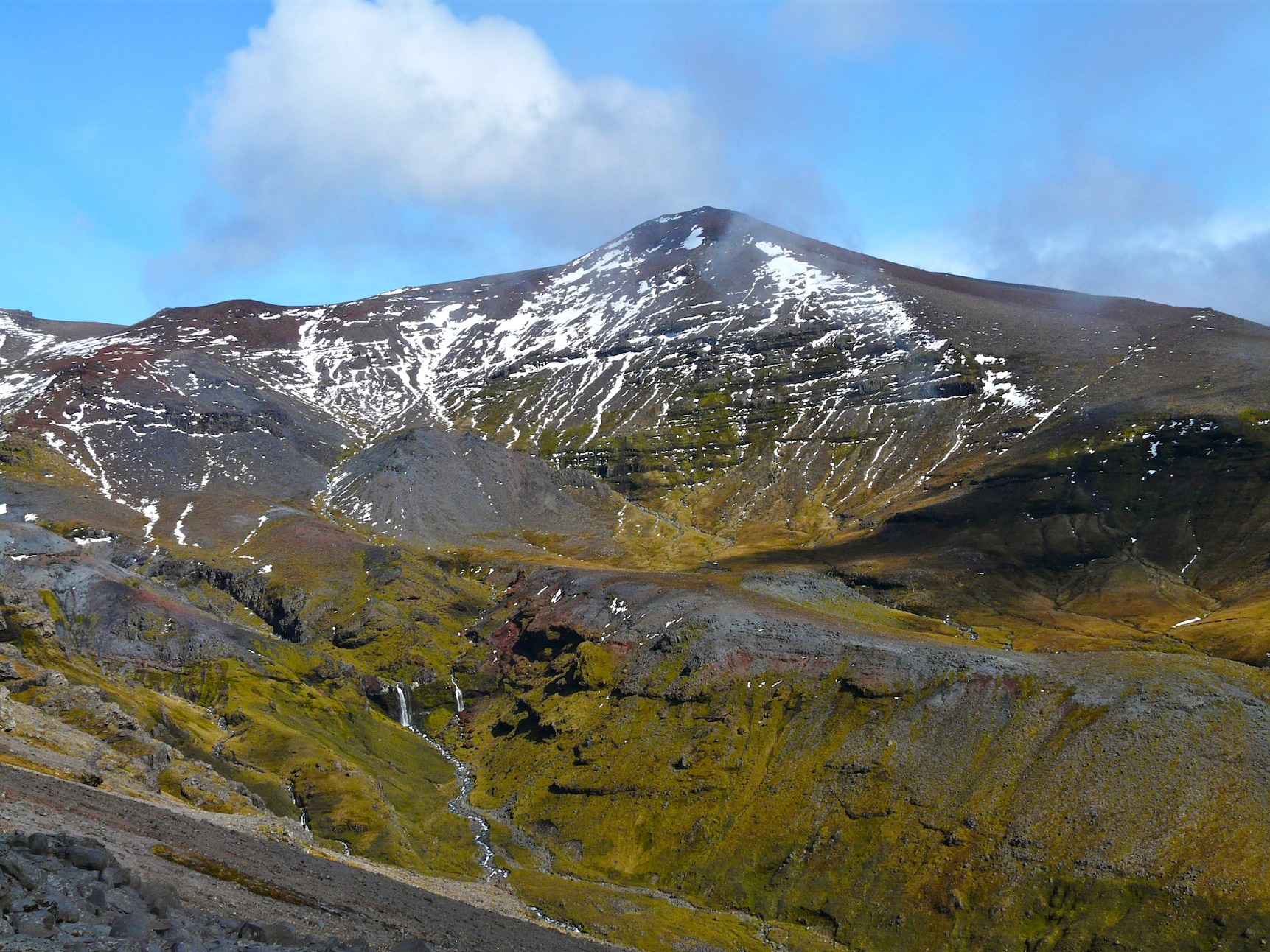
- View of the mountain from the northeast.

Highest point
- Elevation: 934 m (3,064 ft)
- Prominence: 934 m (3,064 ft)
- Isolation: 29.78 km (18.50 mi)
- Coordinates: 46°26′16″S 51°44′44″E

Geography
- Location within Indian Ocean
- Location: Île de la Possession, Crozet Islands, French Southern and Antarctic Lands

Geology
- Mountain type: Stratovolcano

Climbing
- First ascent: unknown

Pic du Mascarin is the highest mountain in the Île de la Possession, Crozet Islands, French Southern and Antarctic Lands, Indian Ocean.

== Geography ==
This 934 m (3,064 ft) high peak rises above the Lac Perdu and the L'au-delà Plateau in the southern sector of Île de la Possession, the largest island of the Crozet group.

The mountain was named after the Mascarin, the ship on which French explorers Marc-Joseph Marion du Fresne and his second-in-command Julien Crozet were the first to explore the Crozet Islands in 1772.

== See also ==
- List of islands by highest point
- Mont Marion-Dufresne, the highest mountain in the Crozet group.
