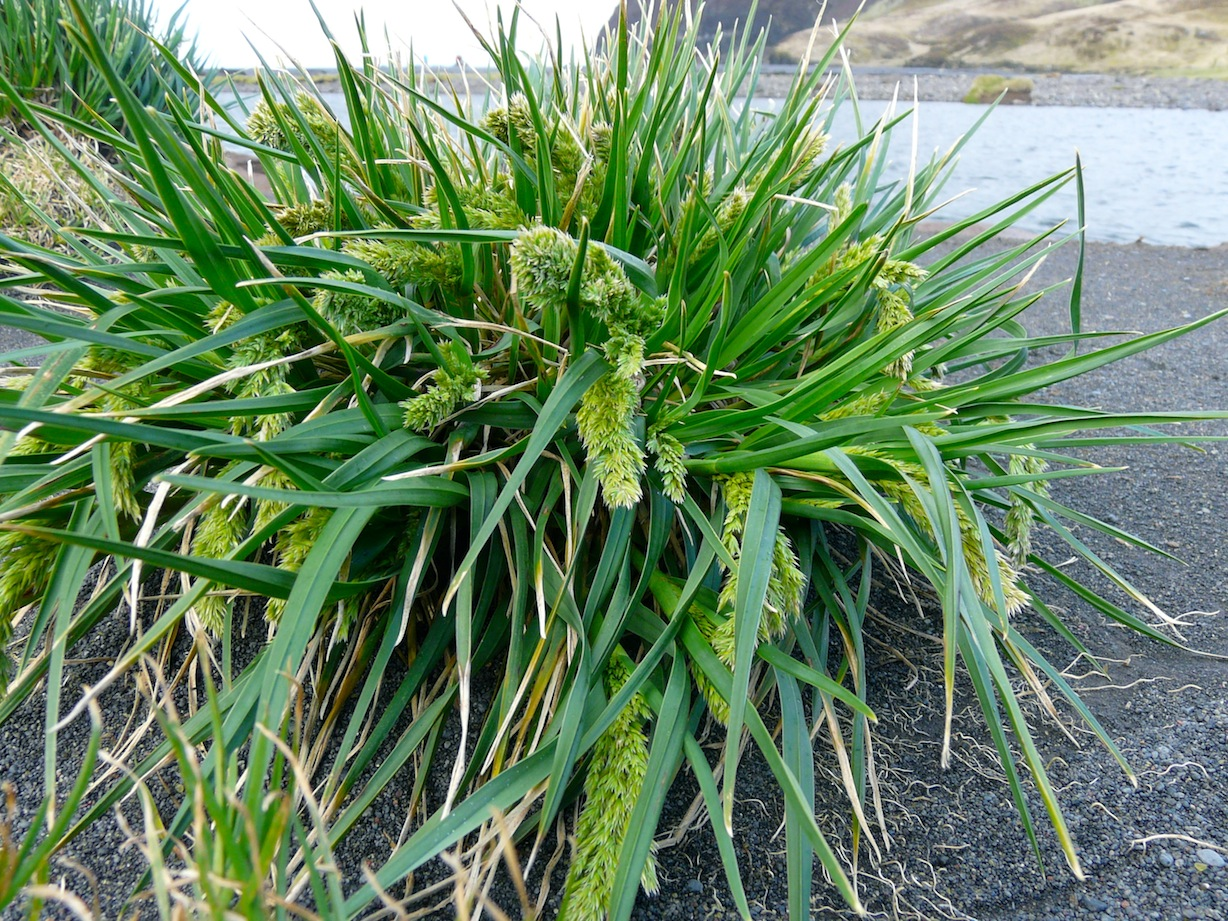

Scientific classification
- Kingdom: Plantae
- Clade: Tracheophytes
- Clade: Angiosperms
- Clade: Monocots
- Clade: Commelinids
- Order: Poales
- Family: Poaceae
- Subfamily: Pooideae
- Genus: Poa
- Species: P. cookii

Binomial name
- Poa cookii (Hook.f.) Hook.f.

Synonyms
- Festuca cookii Hook.f.; Poa hamiltonii Kirk

= Poa cookii =

Species of grass

Poa cookii, sometimes called Cook's tussock-grass or bluegrass, is a species of tussock grass native to various subantarctic islands. The specific epithet honours British explorer James Cook who visited the Kerguelen Islands in 1776.

== Description ==
Poa cookii is a deep green, perennial, gynomonoecious grass growing as densely clumped tussocks up to 800 mm in height, with the fibres from older leaf-sheaths forming a tangled mass at the base of the plant. It is a smaller plant than Poa foliosa with which it may grow. The grass flowers from November to February.

== Distribution and habitat ==
The grass is found on the Prince Edward, Crozet, Heard and Kerguelen Islands of the southern Indian Ocean, as well as on Australia's Macquarie Island. On Heard it occupies moist and sandy areas along the shore and on peat flats with the cushion plant Azorella selago. On Macquarie it grows on rocky areas along the coast up to 200 m above sea level, on flats and slopes on wet peat and along the edges of creeks, often flourishing in the nutrient-rich soil near penguin colonies where it has a competitive advantage over the dominant Poa foliosa. On the Prince Edward Islands Poa cookii is eaten by caterpillars of the native moth Embryonopsis halticella. On Macquarie it has been severely affected by rabbit grazing.
