= List of volcanoes in French Southern and Antarctic Lands =

This is a list of active and dormant volcanoes.

Name	Elevation		Location	Last eruption
Name	meters	feet	Coordinates	Last eruption
Amsterdam Island	881	2890	37.83°S 77.52°E	Holocene
Boomerang Seamount	−650	−2133	37.721°S 77.825°E	1995
Ile aux Cochons	775	2543	46.10°S 50.23°E	Holocene
Ile de l'Est	1090	3576	46.43°S 52.20°E	Holocene
Ile de la Possession	934	3064	46.42°S 51.75°E	Holocene
Kerguelen Islands	1840	6037	49.58°S 69.50°E	Holocene
Île Saint-Paul	268	879	38.72°S 77.53°E	1793
