= Île de la Possession =

Largest and only inhabited Crozet Island

Nickname: Possession Island
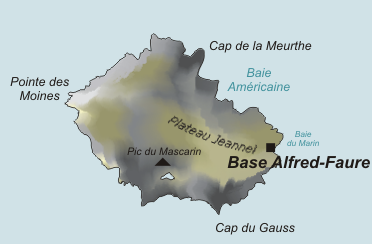
- Interactive map of Île de la Possession

Geography
- Location: Indian Ocean
- Coordinates: 46°24′27″S 51°45′27″E
- Archipelago: Crozet Islands
- Area: 150 km^{2} (58 sq mi)
- Length: 18 km (11.2 mi)
- Width: 13 km (8.1 mi)
- Highest elevation: 934 m (3064 ft)
- Highest point: Pic du Mascarin

Administration
- France

Demographics
- Population: No permanent inhabitants; temporary research station staff only

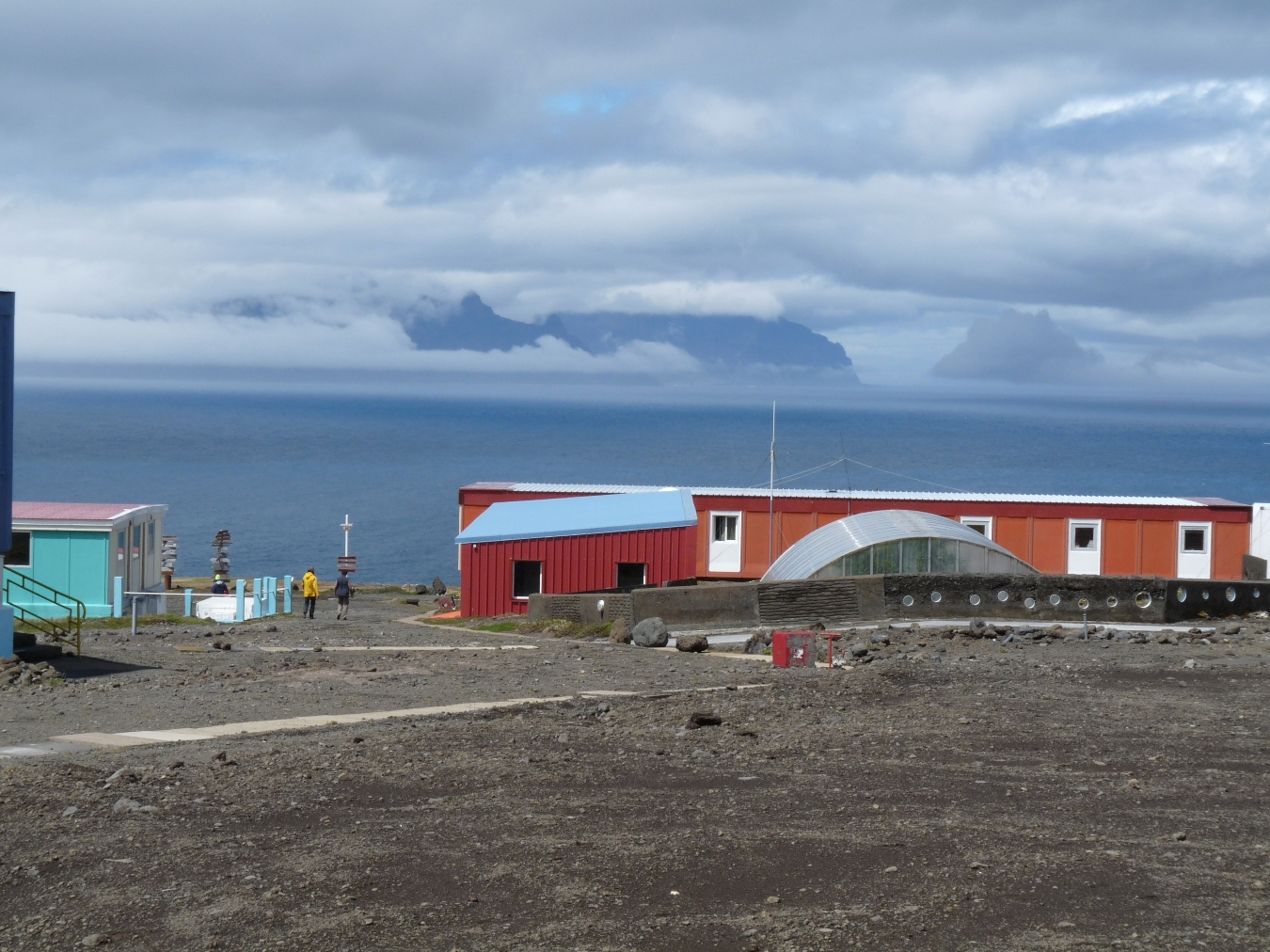
Alfred Faure research station

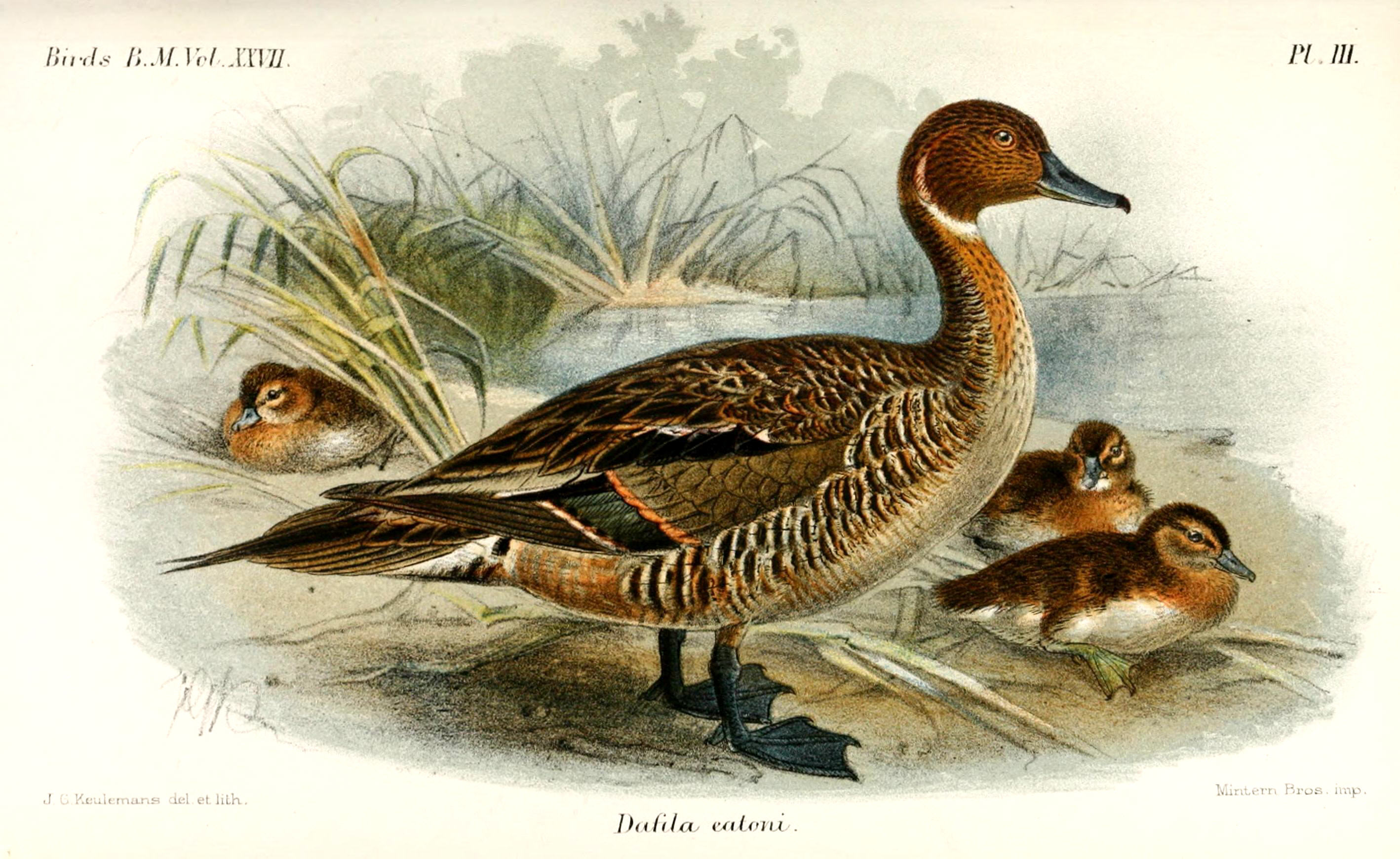
Eaton's Pintails inhabit the island

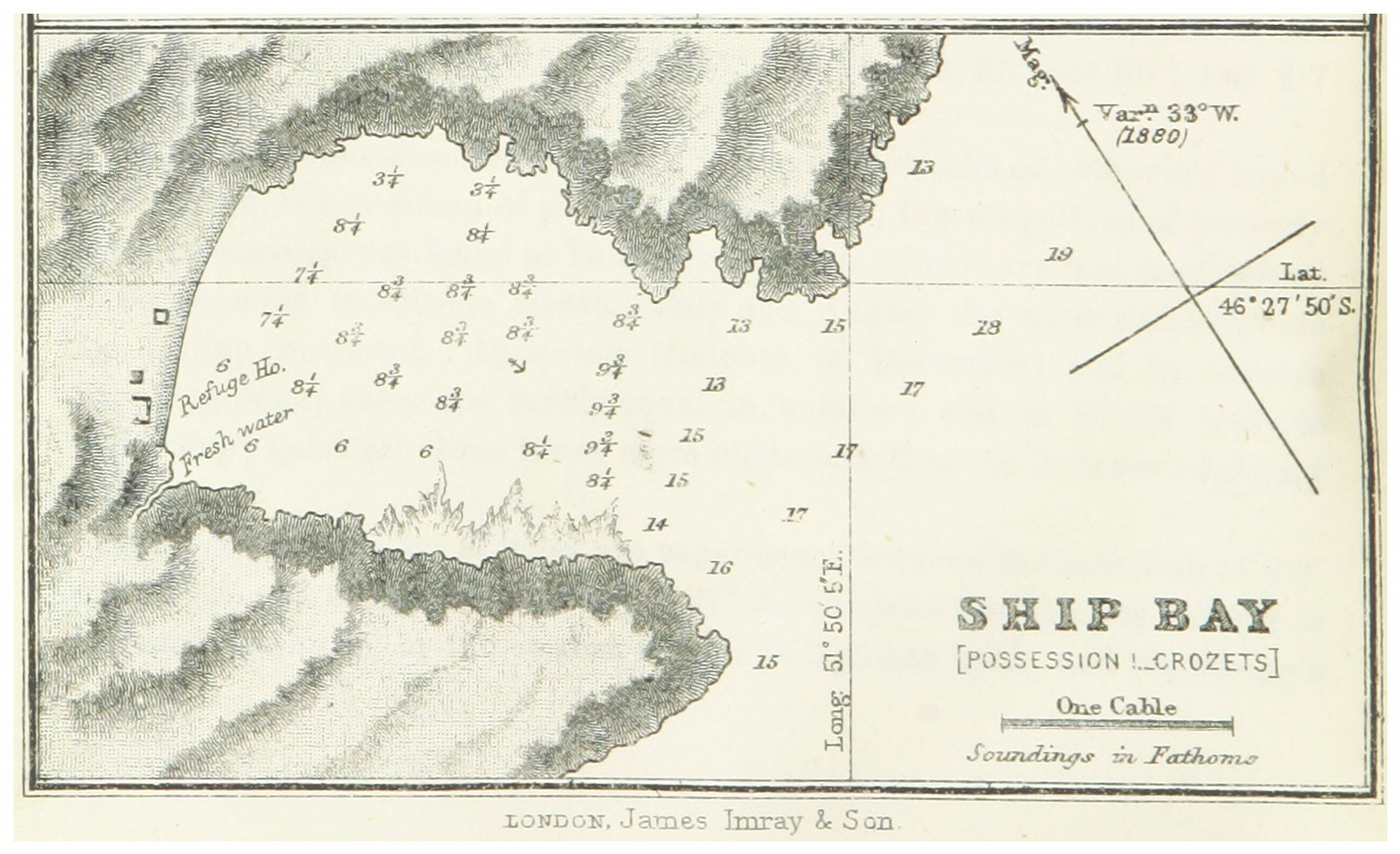
Observation results at Ship Bay, Île de la Possession, published 1893

Île de la Possession (French pronunciation: [il də la pɔsɛsjɔ̃]), or Possession Island, formerly Île de la Prise de Possession, is part of the Subantarctic Crozet Archipelago. Administratively, it is part of the French Southern and Antarctic Lands. It is in the eastern group of the archipelago, about 17 kilometres (11 mi) west of Île de l'Est (East Island). The highest point is at Pic du Mascarin in the southern central part of the island at 828 metres (2,717 ft), rising above Lac Perdu.

Île de la Possession is an important nesting site for seabirds. In January 1841 the Ross expedition anchored near the island. The island contains the Alfred Faure research station.

== Geography ==
Île de la Possession lies in the eastern group of the archipelago, about 17 kilometres (11 mi) west of Île de l'Est (East Island). With an area of 150 km^{2} (58 sq mi) it is the largest island of the group and the only inhabited one. It has a rugged landscape of mountains cut by deep glaciated valleys.

Pic du Mascarin is the highest point of the island with an elevation of 828 metres (2,717 ft), rising above Lac Perdu in the southern, central part of the island. Mont des Cratères has an elevation of 679 metres (2,228 ft), and Cirque aux Mille Couleurs has an elevation of 366 metres (1,201 ft).

The coastal areas and valleys are covered with herbaceous subantarctic vegetation. It is uninhabited except for the staff of a research station.

== Alfred Faure research station ==
The Alfred Faure research station (Base Alfred-Faure) is located at the eastern end of Île de la Possession, at an elevation of 143 m above Baie Marin (Port Alfred). It comprises about 12 main buildings and supports up to about 45 visiting personnel. It is named after a leader of the base in the 1960s. A 1.6 km road and aerial cableway connect the base to the sea, where supplies are brought by the vessel Marion Dufresne. The daily temperature at the site varies annually from an average high of 7.9°C to an average low of 2.7°C.

== Wildlife ==
=== Birds ===
The island has been identified as an Important Bird Area (IBA) by BirdLife International as a breeding site for seabirds, of which there are at least 26 breeding species. Birds nesting in relatively large numbers include king, northern rockhopper and macaroni penguins, wandering, sooty and light-mantled albatrosses, northern giant petrels, medium-billed prions, Kerguelen and soft-plumaged petrels, and South Georgia diving petrels. Other island breeders in smaller numbers are southern giant petrels, grey-headed albatrosses and Kerguelen terns. Crozet blue-eyed shags, black-faced sheathbills and Eaton's pintails are resident. The smaller birds nest only at higher altitudes because of their vulnerability to rat predation at lower levels.

=== Other wildlife ===
The goats that were introduced have been eradicated, though black rats remain and are a threat to the birdlife. Both Antarctic and subantarctic fur seals, as well as southern elephant seals, breed on the island. A pod of about 80 killer whales inhabits the surrounding waters. Two plants and 59 arthropod species endemic to the archipelago are present.

== See also ==
- List of Antarctic islands north of 60° S
