= Embryonopsis halticella =

Scientific classification
- Kingdom: Animalia
- Phylum: Arthropoda
- Clade: Pancrustacea
- Class: Insecta
- Order: Lepidoptera
- Family: Plutellidae
- Genus: Embryonopsis
- Species: E. halticella

Binomial name
- Embryonopsis halticella Eaton, 1875

Synonyms
- Embryonopsis heardensis Brown, 1964

Species of insect

Embryonopsis halticella is a species of flightless moth found on islands of the sub-Antarctic Indian Ocean (Crozet archipelago, Heard Island, Kerguelen Islands and Prince Edward Islands).

== Taxonomy ==
Embryonopsis halticella was described by A. E. Eaton in 1876 from specimens collected on Kerguelen Islands.

== Description ==
The moth is 5–5.5 mm (0.20–0.22 in), brown and brachypterous. Mature caterpillars are 8–10 mm (0.31–0.39 in) long. As a caterpillar this species is not freeze-tolerant, but they do not freeze until they have reached −17 to −20 °C (1 to −4 °F).

== Hosts and behaviour ==
The adult moths do not feed. Caterpillars eat tussock grass Poa cookii. The whole life of a caterpillar is spent inside the inner fronds of tussock tillers. All life stages can be found throughout the year but on Kerguelen, adults peak during December. Caterpillars of Embryonopsis halticella cause extensive damage to tussock grass.

== Distribution ==
Despite reduced wings of the adult moth this species is found in four island groups in the Sub-Antarctic: Prince Edward Islands, Heard Island, Kerguelen Islands, and the Crozet archipelago. The distribution of the moth matches that of its food plant the tussock grass Poa cookii.
