= Alfred Faure =

French research station on Possession Island in the Crozet group

- Antarctic base
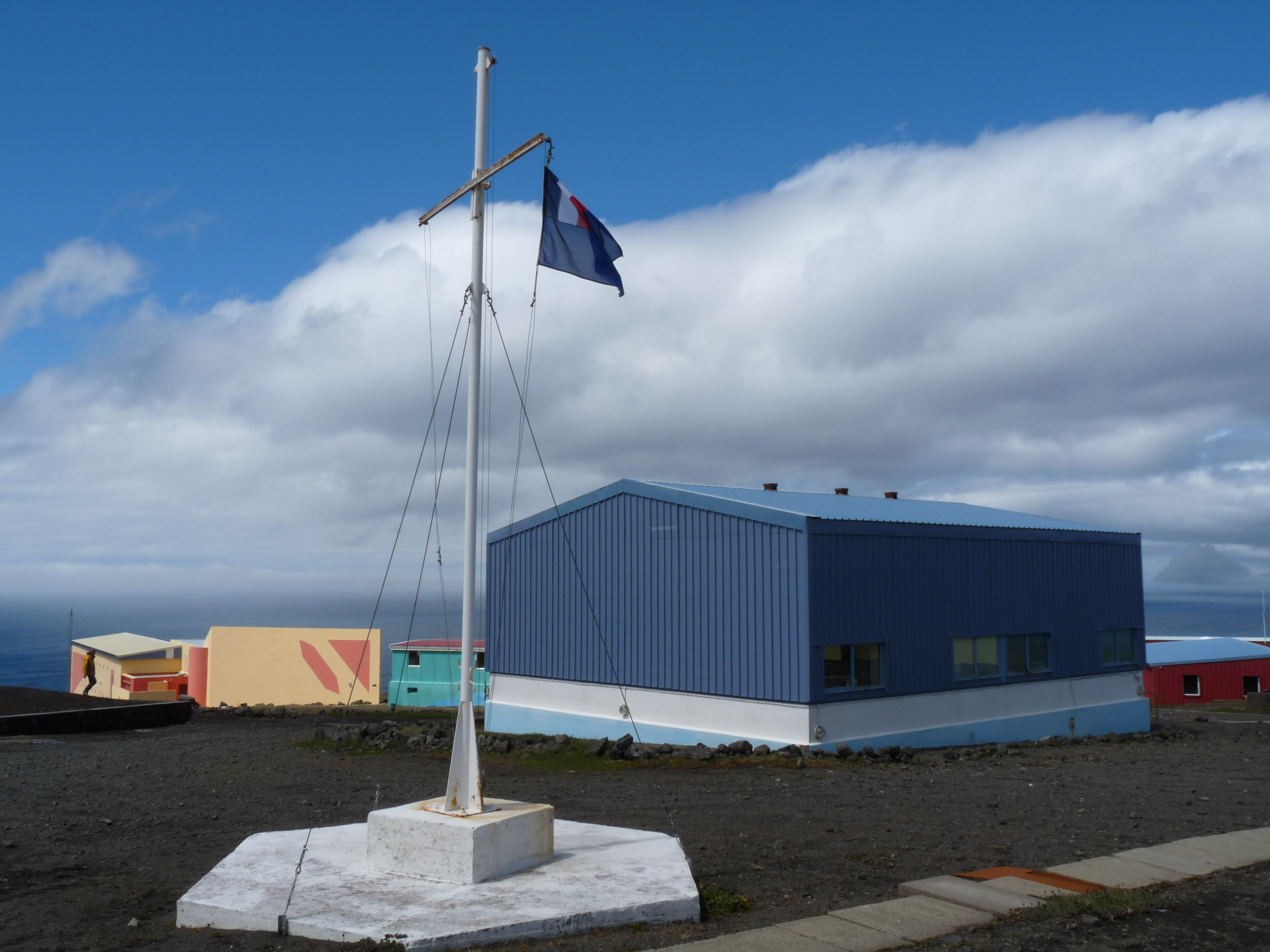
- Alfred Faure station

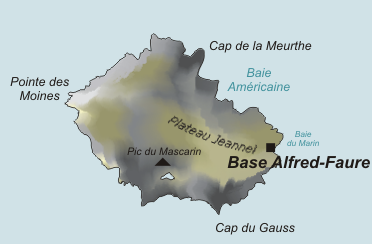
- Location on Possession Island

- Location in the Indian Ocean
- Coordinates: 46°25′57″S 51°51′28″E
- Country: France
- Territory: TAAF
- Archipelago: Crozet Islands
- Island: Île de la Possession
- Operator: French Polar Institute
- Established: 1963
- Elevation: 143 m (469 ft)

Population (2021)
  - Summer: 35
  - Winter: 24
- Time zone: UTC+4
- UN/LOCODE: TF
- Active times: All year-round
- Status: Operational
- Activities: List: Meteorology; Seismology; Biology
- Facilities: List: Basic lab equipment; Surgery room
- Website: institut-polaire.fr

Alfred-Faure or Port Alfred is a permanent French scientific station on Île de la Possession (Possession Island) of the subantarctic Crozet Archipelago of the French Southern and Antarctic Lands in the South Indian Ocean.

== Research station ==
The station is located at the eastern end of the island on a plateau 143 m (460 ft) above sea level. Depending on the season, there are 15 to 60 personnel living and working at the base. Their scientific work includes meteorological, seismic, biological and geological research. It was first established during the austral summer of 1963–1964, replacing a temporary scientific base built in 1961. The new station was named after Alfred Faure, the site's leader in the early 1960s. Alfred-Faure is visited a few times a year by the Marion Dufresne, an oceanographic research vessel which delivers supplies and rotating crews of scientists. There is a 1.6 km road that connects the research station to the coast.

== Climate ==
Alfred Faure Station has a very mild tundra climate (Koppen ET) with cool to cold summers and cold (but still averaging above freezing) winters. Due to its oceanic location near the subpolar low, it has a very cloudy and rainy climate with just 600 hours of bright sunshine per year (one of the lowest in the world) and over 70 inches (1750 mm) of rain a year. Similar to other subpolar oceanic islands in the southern hemisphere it is also very windy (especially because of the ocean being effectively flat terrain).

Climate data for Alfred Faure (1981–2010)
Month	Jan	Feb	Mar	Apr	May	Jun	Jul	Aug	Sep	Oct	Nov	Dec	Year
Record high °C (°F)	22.4 (72.3)	21.7 (71.1)	21.2 (70.2)	19.7 (67.5)	16.5 (61.7)	16.0 (60.8)	14.9 (58.8)	16.4 (61.5)	15.4 (59.7)	17.5 (63.5)	19.7 (67.5)	20.7 (69.3)	22.4 (72.3)
Mean daily maximum °C (°F)	10.4 (50.7)	11.0 (51.8)	10.1 (50.2)	9.1 (48.4)	7.2 (45.0)	6.1 (43.0)	6.0 (42.8)	5.4 (41.7)	5.8 (42.4)	6.8 (44.2)	7.8 (46.0)	9.2 (48.6)	7.9 (46.2)
Daily mean °C (°F)	7.5 (45.5)	8.1 (46.6)	7.4 (45.3)	6.5 (43.7)	4.9 (40.8)	3.8 (38.8)	3.7 (38.7)	3.2 (37.8)	3.3 (37.9)	4.1 (39.4)	5.0 (41.0)	6.3 (43.3)	5.3 (41.5)
Mean daily minimum °C (°F)	4.5 (40.1)	5.2 (41.4)	4.8 (40.6)	3.9 (39.0)	2.5 (36.5)	1.5 (34.7)	1.4 (34.5)	0.9 (33.6)	0.8 (33.4)	1.3 (34.3)	2.3 (36.1)	3.3 (37.9)	2.7 (36.9)
Record low °C (°F)	0.0 (32.0)	0.7 (33.3)	−0.4 (31.3)	−1.7 (28.9)	−2.5 (27.5)	−3.7 (25.3)	−5.0 (23.0)	−4.7 (23.5)	−6.6 (20.1)	−3.9 (25.0)	−2.8 (27.0)	−1.9 (28.6)	−6.6 (20.1)
Average precipitation mm (inches)	127.8 (5.03)	129.1 (5.08)	146.2 (5.76)	160.2 (6.31)	186.2 (7.33)	131.7 (5.19)	139.2 (5.48)	157.3 (6.19)	163.6 (6.44)	156.2 (6.15)	147.9 (5.82)	142.0 (5.59)	1,782.5 (70.18)
Average precipitation days (≥ 1.0 mm)	12.97	11.64	13.37	15.89	16.54	14.85	15.81	16.04	14.75	13.86	12.92	14.88	172.91
Mean monthly sunshine hours	96.6	74.7	65.4	10.9	17.1	14.8	30.8	41.9	46.1	62.1	80.1	63.2	600.4
Source: Meteo climat
