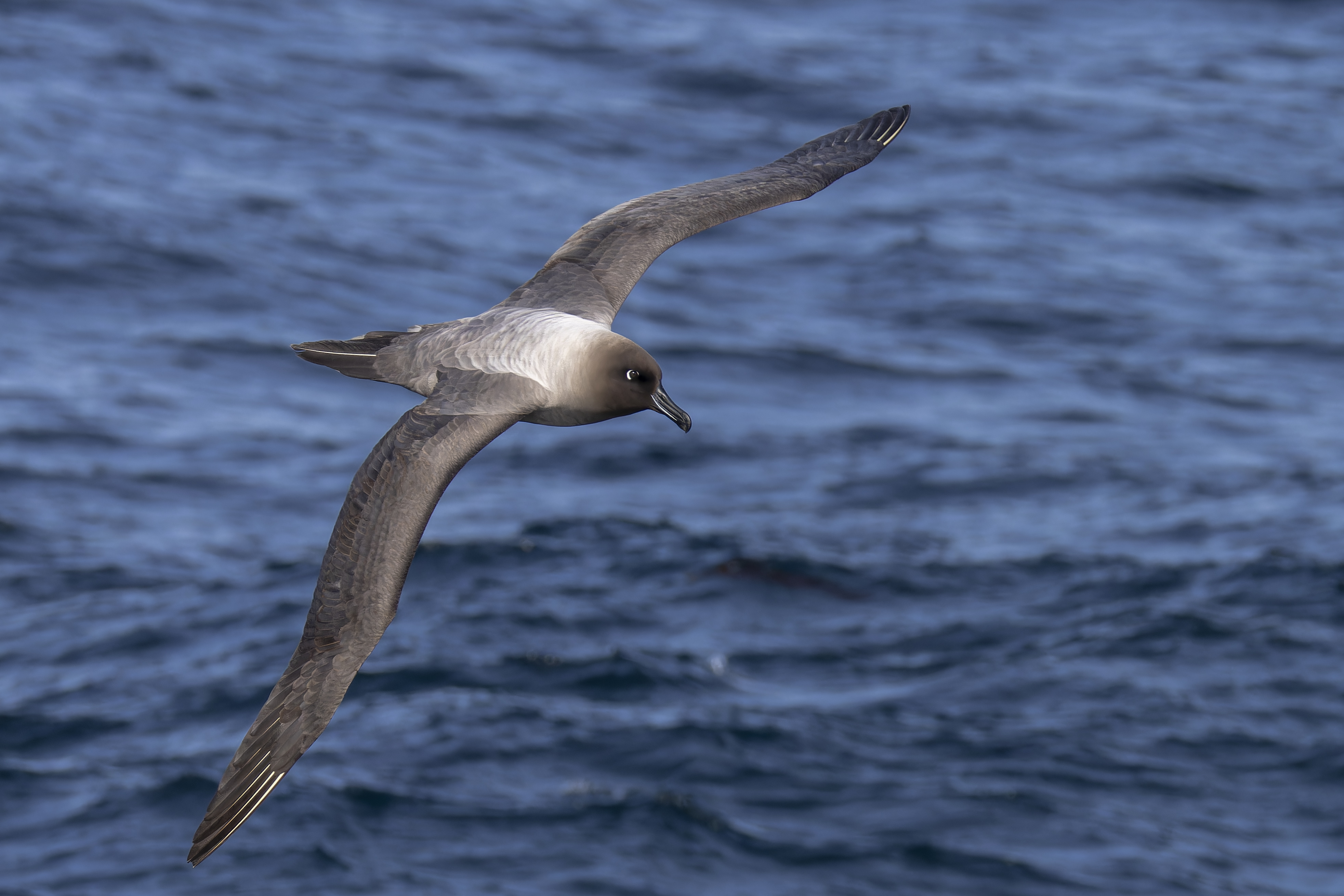
- Adult in flight off Auckland Island

Conservation status
- Near Threatened (IUCN 3.1)

Scientific classification
- Kingdom: Animalia
- Phylum: Chordata
- Class: Aves
- Order: Procellariiformes
- Family: Diomedeidae
- Genus: Phoebetria
- Species: P. palpebrata

Binomial name
- Phoebetria palpebrata (Forster, 1785)

Synonyms
- Diomedea palpebrata

= Light-mantled albatross =

Species of marine bird

The light-mantled albatross (Phoebetria palpebrata), also known as the grey-mantled albatross or the light-mantled sooty albatross, is a small albatross in the genus Phoebetria, which it shares with the sooty albatross. The light-mantled albatross was first described as Phoebetria palpebrata by Johann Reinhold Forster, in 1785, based on a specimen from south of the Cape of Good Hope.

== Physiology ==
Light-mantled albatrosses share some identifying features with other Procellariiformes. They have nasal tubes on the upper bill called naricorns, though with albatrosses these are on the sides of the upper mandible rather than the top. They also have a salt gland above the nasal passage which excretes a concentrated saline solution to maintain osmotic balance, due to the amount of seawater imbibed. The bills of the Procellariiformes are unique in that they are covered with from seven to nine horny plates. These birds produce a stomach oil made up of wax esters and triglycerides that is stored in the proventriculus. This can be sprayed out of their mouths as a defence against predators as well as an energy rich food source for chicks and for the adults during their long flights.

== Description ==
The light-mantled albatross is largely sooty-brown or blackish, darker on the head, with paler upperparts from the nape to the upper tail-coverts which are grey to light grey, the palest on the mantle and back. The plumage has been described as being similar in appearance to the colouring of a Siamese cat. The eyes are partly encircled with thin post-orbital crescents of very short grey feathers. The bill is black with a blue sulcus and a greyish-yellow line along the lower mandible, and is about 105 mm (4.1 in). Measurements show that males and females are similar in size, with average length of 79 to 89 cm (31–35 in), wing-span of 183 to 232 cm (6.00–7.61 ft), and weight of 2.5 to 3.7 kg (5.5–8.2 lb).

== Distribution and habitat ==
The light-mantled albatross has a circumpolar pelagic distribution in the Southern Ocean. It ranges in latitude from the pack-ice around Antarctica, with the southernmost record from 78°S in the Ross Sea, to about 35°S, with occasional sightings further north along the Humboldt Current. It breeds on several subantarctic islands including the Prince Edward Island, Marion Island, Crozet Islands, Amsterdam Island, St. Paul Island, Kerguelen Islands, Heard Island, Macquarie Island, Campbell Island, Auckland Islands, Antipodes Islands and South Georgia and at least on one island in the maritime Antarctic at 62°S on King George Island. Except when breeding, its habitat is entirely marine, and it will forage from the edges of the Antarctic pack-ice to about 40°S. When foraging during the breeding season, the birds will remain closer to their nest sites.

== Behaviour ==
They have a loud shrill voice that is trumpet-like, and when threatened will snap their bills or utilize a throaty "gaaaa". When courting, they will utilize aerial displays and formation flying. They will also use mutual calling with deviations in tone brought occurring by head positioning, and finally, they use their tail in displays more than other albatrosses.

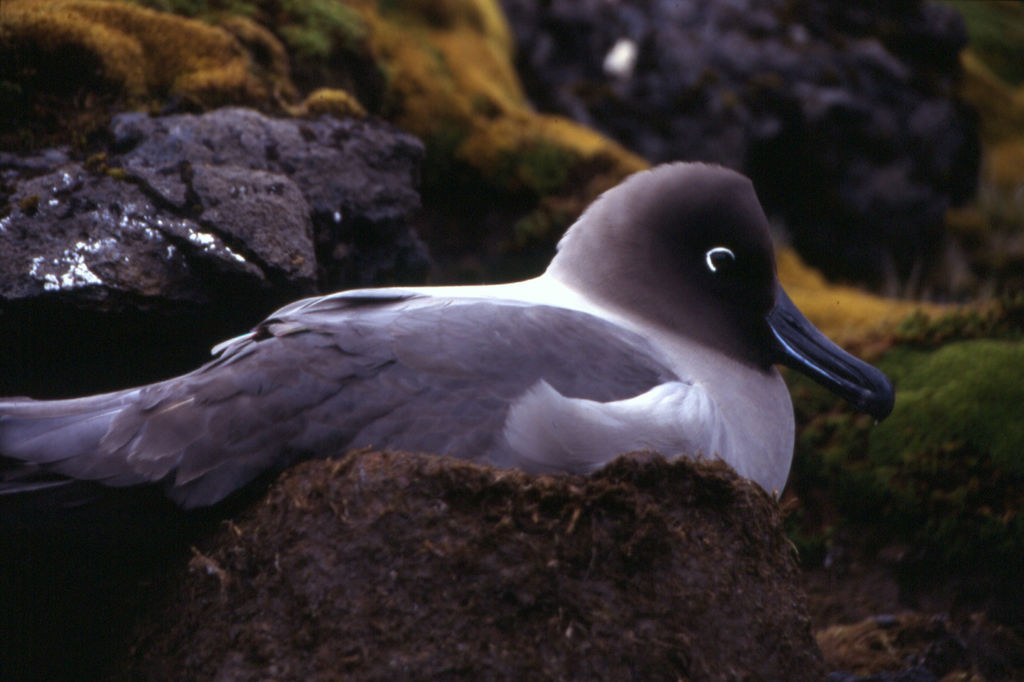
Light-mantled albatross sitting on nest

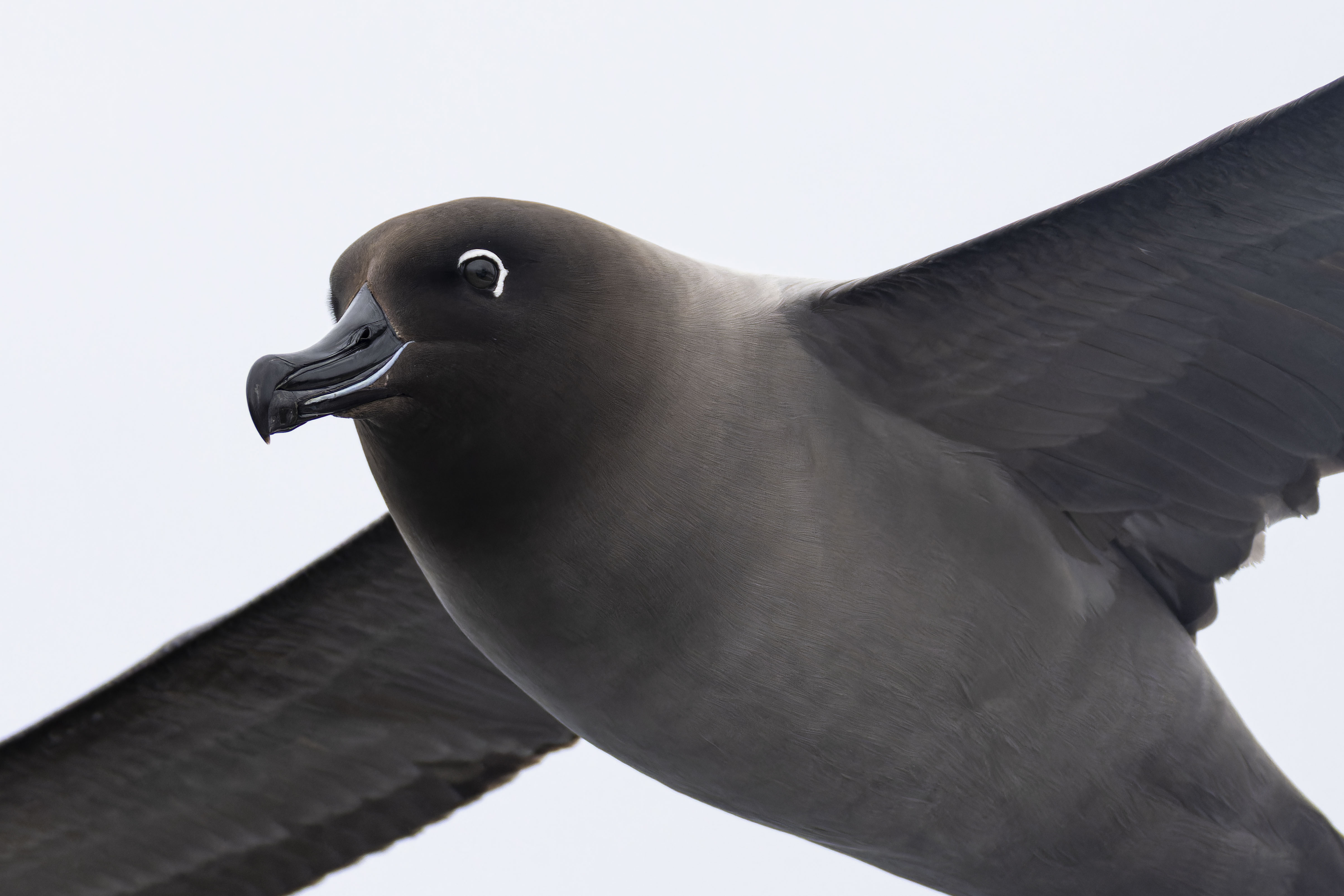
Light-mantled albatross, head detail

=== Reproduction ===
The species breeds in loose colonies or small groups, and sometimes is a solitary breeder. The nest is built on a vegetated cliff ledge, or a steep slope, sheltered from the prevailing westerly winds. Structurally it is a low mound of peat and mud, 15 to 30 cm (5.9–11.8 in) high and 45 to 55 cm (18–22 in) wide at the base, with a cupped hollow at the top. It incorporates some plant material and a grass lining. Around October or November, a single egg is laid, which is not replaced if lost. Both sexes incubate alternately in shifts that vary from a day or two up to nearly a month in length. This egg measures 9.8–10.7 cm (3.9–4.2 in) in length and 6.3–7 cm (2.5–2.8 in) in width, with a mass of 210–280 g (7.4–9.9 oz). The incubation period is 65 to 72 days. After hatching in December or January, which takes 3 to 5 days, the chicks are brooded in shifts for about 20 days, following which they are left alone in the nests while the adults forage, returning to feed the chicks by regurgitation every 2 to 3 days. The entire nestling period from hatching to fledging, which occurs in May or June, lasts 140 to 170 days. Pairs form committed pair-bonds which may last for decades, being renewed through complex courtship displays at the breeding site. On average, birds begin breeding when they are 8 to 15 years old, after which they breed biennially, fledging a chick every five years or so. They are capable of breeding until at least 32 years old and living to 40 or longer.

Breeding population and trends
Breeding location	Breeding pairs	Trend
Possession Island	996	-13% over 15 years
Rest of Crozet Islands	1,404	Unknown
South Georgia	5,000 to 7,500	Unknown
Kerguelen Islands	3,000 to 5,000	Unknown
Auckland Islands	5,000	Unknown
Macquarie Island	2,000	Unknown
Campbell Island	1,600	Unknown
Antipodes Island	170	Unknown
Heard Island	200 to 500	Unknown
Marion Island	179	Stable
Prince Edward Island	150	Unknown
King George Island	5	Unknown
Total	58,000	-20% to -29% over 100 years

=== Feeding ===
The principal diet of light-mantled albatrosses consists of squid and krill, though other crustaceans and fish are taken as well as seal, penguin and petrel carrion. They sometimes feed in association with pilot whales and southern right whale dolphins, and occasionally follow ships. Food is usually taken on or close to the surface of the ocean, within a depth of 5 m (16 ft), though there is a record of a 12 m (39 ft) dive.

== Conservation ==
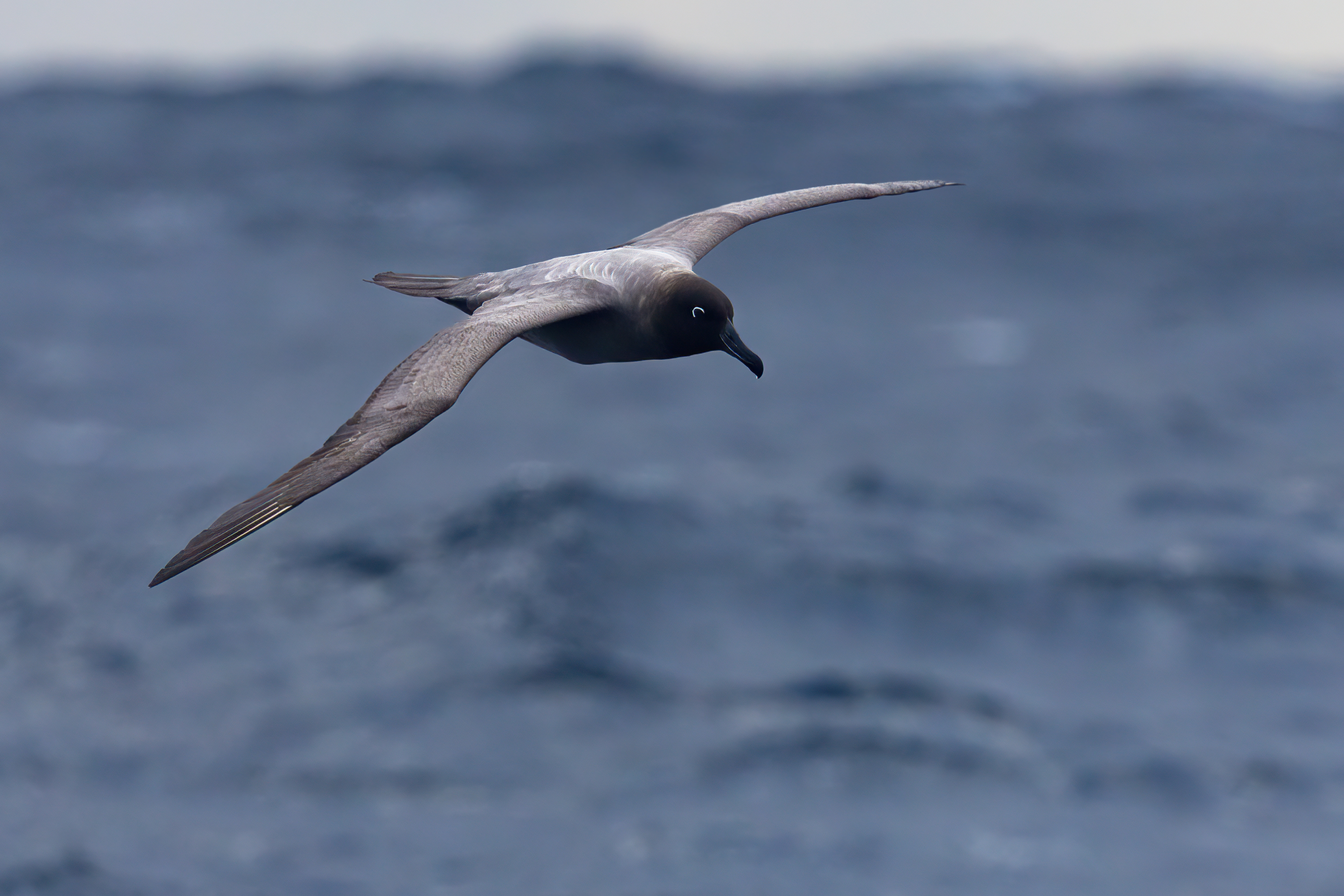
Light-mantled sooty albatross

The light-mantled albatross population is estimated at 58,000, from a 1998 estimate, and is declining. Threats and population status are poorly quantified and the species is classified as near threatened, with an occurrence range of 44,300,000 km^{2} (17,100,000 sq mi).

Potential predators on some breeding islands are giant petrels, feral cats and rodents. At sea they are threatened by bycatch in the longline fishery and through starvation by eating plastic marine debris.
