= Mont Marion-Dufresne =

Mountain in France

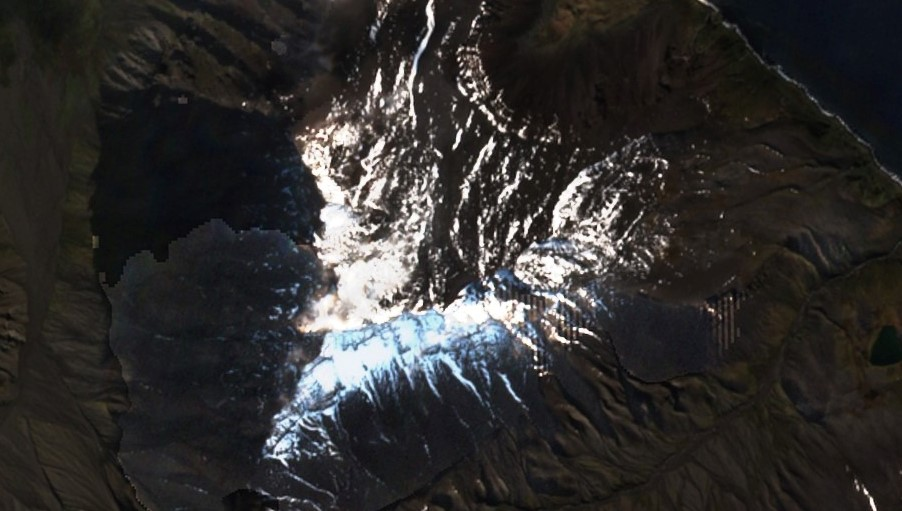
- Mont Marion-Dufresne Sentinel-2 image.

Highest point
- Elevation: 1,050 m (3,440 ft)
- Prominence: 1,050 m (3,440 ft)
- Isolation: 1,107.81 km (688.36 mi)
- Coordinates: 46°24′48″S 52°15′04″E

Geography
- Location within Indian Ocean
- Location: Île de l'Est, Crozet Islands, French Southern and Antarctic Lands

Geology
- Mountain type: Stratovolcano

Climbing
- First ascent: unknown

Mont Marion-Dufresne is the highest mountain in the Crozet Islands, French Southern and Antarctic Lands, Indian Ocean.

== Geography ==
This 1,050 m (3,440 ft) high peak rises in the northeastern sector of Île de l'Est, the easternmost island of the Crozet group. The summit is seasonally covered with snow.

The mountain was named after French privateer and explorer Marc-Joseph Marion du Fresne (1724–1772), who was the first to put the Crozet Islands on the map.

== See also ==
- List of islands by highest point
- Topographic isolation
