= Marion Dufresne (1994) =

1994 French research and supply vessel

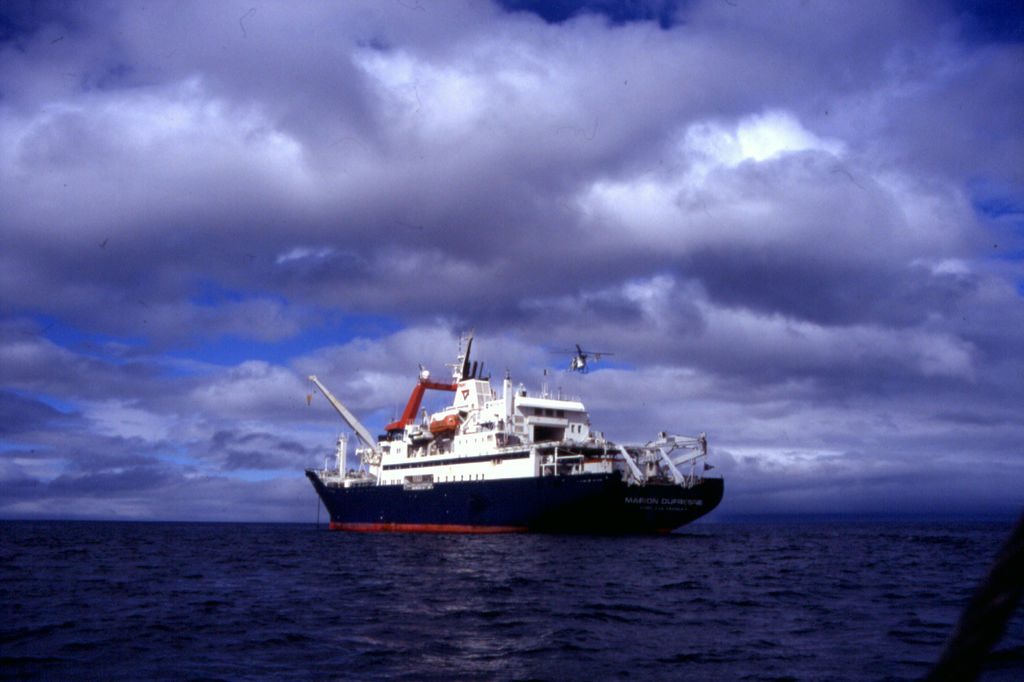

History
- Name: Marion Dufresne
- Namesake: Marc-Joseph Marion du Fresne
- Owner: CMA CGM The French Line
- Operator: Institut polaire français Paul-Émile Victor (IPEV) for oceanography; Territory of the French Southern and Antarctic Lands (TAAF) for logistics
- Port of registry: Le Havre (France)
- Builder: Ateliers et chantiers du Havre
- Launched: 23 June 1994
- Commissioned: 12 May 1995
- Identification: IMO number: 9050814; MMSI number: 227235000; Callsign: FNIN
- Nickname(s): Le Marduf
- Status: in active service

General characteristics
- Displacement: 4,900 tonnes (empty) 10,380 tonnes full load
- Length: 120.50 m (395 ft 4 in)
- Beam: 20.60 m (67 ft 7 in)
- Draught: 6.95 m (22 ft 10 in)
- Propulsion: Diesel electric; Two electric propulsion motors: 2,650 kW ea on two shafts; 750 kW (1,010 hp) bow thruster; Propulsion electric power: two 8-cylinder and one 6-cylinder diesel engines
- Speed: 17 knots (31 km/h; 20 mph) (max)
- Endurance: 2 months
- Capacity: 110 passengers capacity in 59 cabins; 2,500 t (2,800 short tons), 5,600 m^{3} (200,000 cu ft) or 1,106.1 m (3,629 ft) standard containers of cargo; 1,170 m^{3} (41,000 cu ft) of fuel
- Complement: 6 officers; 22 sailors
- Aircraft carried: Helicopter pad for one Eurocopter Dauphin, Eurocopter Écureuil, Aérospatiale Alouette II or Aérospatiale Alouette III

Marion Dufresne is a research and supply vessel named in honour of the 18th-century French explorer Marc-Joseph Marion du Fresne launched in 1995 and having two main missions: logistic support for the French Austral Islands and oceanographic research.

The Marion Dufresne (IMO 9050814) is chartered by the French TAAF on an annual basis from the French shipping line CMA CGM (The French Line) and is maintained by the IPEV (Institut polaire français – Paul-Émile Victor). The current Marion Dufresne is the replacement for the slightly smaller Marion Dufresne that served the TAAF from 1973 to 1995.

The ship was constructed by Ateliers et Chantiers du Havre of Normandy, France and delivered on 12 May 1995; it is registered in Marseille but its base of operations is the island of La Réunion.

The Marion Dufresne was designed for the very severe weather conditions of the Southern Ocean. She possesses exceptional seakeeping behavior – allowing full performance in the very rough seas found there.

== Mission ==
The Marion Dufresne is used to service the districts of the Crozet and Kerguelen Islands, and the smaller islands of Amsterdam and St-Paul, delivering supplies, fuel, and personnel to the three permanently staffed bases there: Alfred Faure (Port Alfred), Port-aux-Français, and Martin-de-Viviès.

With the additional capacity as a logistics vessel, the Marion Dufresne, as a research vessel, is among the largest of the world fleet. Her accommodation options, freight handling, and endurance allow cruises and research campaigns of the most demanding sort.

Due to an increasing scientific demand, in 1999 the French Ministry of Research reduced the ship time devoted to logistical operations to 120 days per year and allowed the IPEV to conduct research world-wide for the remaining 245 days a year. Therefore, the ship is no longer confined to the Indian Ocean and conducts research in all oceans. This has allowed for the development of integrated, multidisciplinary programs, for instance, spending several months in 1999 coring for paleo-climatic purposes in the North Atlantic.

== Ship facilities ==
With a capacity for 110 passengers in 59 cabins, the Marion Dufresne allows large scientific parties to embark on multidisciplinary programs. There is a hospital with operating theatre, pharmacy, video/conference center, library, gym and a ship's store.

=== Propulsion ===
Diesel-electric propulsion is provided by three Cegelec electric motors – one 750 kW bow thruster and two AC synchronous electric propulsion motors: 2,650 kW each manufactured by GEC Alsthom Moteurs driving two propeller shafts. Electric power to run the motors is generated by two 8-cylinder (8R32D) and one 6-cylinder (6R32D) diesel engines, manufactured by the Finnish company Wärtsilä.

=== Boats ===
The ship carries a complement of several smaller working boats on board. The largest is the container barge Gros Ventre ("Fat Belly"), named in honour of the fluyt Gros Ventre of the First voyage of Kerguelen; others include a small utility boat, a semi-rigid rubber raft, and a Zodiac. Naturally the vessel also carries the required types of lifeboats.

=== Aircraft ===
The Marion Dufresne possesses a helicopter platform and may carry one of a series of helicopters to ferry provisions and personnel from ship to shore. These may include the Eurocopter AS365 Dauphin, Eurocopter AS 350 Écureuil, and Aérospatiale Alouette II or III. These aircraft are leased from HeliLagon on Réunion.

=== Heavy lifting ===
The vessel possesses two fast 23-tonne (25-short-ton) cranes (41 tonnes or 45 short tons when coupled), one logistic/ oceanographic 16-tonne (18-short-ton) crane, and one 2.7-tonne (3-short-ton) service crane.

=== Navigation ===
The ship's complement of navigation equipment includes:

- Three GPS navigation systems and SkyFix differential correction
- Doppler speed log
- Gyro compass
- Time server
- Attitude control and navigation system
- Ultra-Short Baseline (USBL) underwater acoustic positioning system
- Dynamic positioning system (DPS)

=== Environment ===
The ship's systems include:

- Central weather station and acoustic anemometer
- Two distribution circuits of "clean" sea water to the laboratories

=== Information technology & communication ===
The vessel has a broad array of communication and computing technologies including:

- Computer workstations: Sun, HP, IBM
- Desktop computers: DOS/Windows & Mac
- Printers and plotters
- Software: MATLAB, Generic Mapping Tools (GMT), Ifremer CARAIBES RT-PP sea floor mapping software
- 200 port gigabit Ethernet network/intranet and work area WiFi
- Server: VMWare server virtualization, renewed 2018 and 2019.
- Data acquisition and archiving, 50TB capacity.
- Batched email and data transmission: Inmarsat systems.
- Phone: Iridium
- Marine VHF transceiver

== Science ==
Featuring modern facilities, it is operational in all fields of oceanography: marine geosciences, marine biology, oceanography, and the physics and chemistry of the oceans.

=== Facilities ===
There are 31 laboratories with 650 square metres (7,000 sq ft) total surface area, plus the possibility of additional lab containers on the bridges and helicopter platform.

=== Geophysics ===
The vessel possesses a full suite of geophysical equipment including multi-beam bathymetry and imagery and includes:

- Three bathymetric sounders:

- Dual-frequency (3.5 and/or 12 kHz) sea bottom profiler coupled with multibeam echosounder (MBES)
- Analog echo sounder (3.5, 12 and 18 kHz)
- Monobeam echo sounder (3.5, 12, 18 and 34 kHz)

- Marine proton magnetometer
- Gravimeter
- Two continuous thermosalinographs (TSGs)
- Two acoustic doppler current profiler (ADCP)
- Conductivity, temperature, depth (CTD) rosette/ carousel (24 bottles)
- Two seismic compressors

=== Coring ===
The Marion Dufresne with its giant corer Calypso, is one of the few ships to collect sediment cores up to 60 metres (200 ft) in length. Calypso is a Kullenberg type round piston corer adjustable 2 to 12 tonnes (2.2 to 13.2 short tons) and 70 metres (230 ft) long. Also on board is a CASQ square gravity corer (0.25 by 0.25 by 12 metres (9.8 in × 9.8 in × 39 ft 4.4 in) long). Since 1995, a program involving 26 nations aims to collect and interpret paleoclimatic data from cores taken in all the world's oceans.

=== Integrated rear heavy sampling (SIAM) ===
Over the stern sampling equipment includes:

- 33-tonne (36-short-ton) capstan, compatible cable aramid (50 tonnes or 55 short tons)
- Three 7,500-metre (24,600 ft) reels of cable, large diameter (up to 30 millimetres or 1.2 inches)
- Two gantries 10/30 t long travel (back and side)
- Three handling winches, cranes of 18 t 2 and t 3, winches, telescopic booms
- Mobile platform equipped with 6.1-metre (20 ft) trawl winches and large diameter reels
- Various samplers and dredges

== Eco-tourism ==
In addition to the usual complement of scientists, researchers, technicians and construction workers, in recent years the Marion Dufresne has also played host to an increasing number of tourists (up to 14 per trip) who book passage for a period lasting about 28 days. A 9,000-kilometre (5,600 mi) passage includes guided tours of Crozet, Kerguelen, and Amsterdam Islands – with opportunities to view the local wildlife. The ship's cabin appointments are simple but comfortable, and several forms of entertainment and exercise are available on board. Meals served on board are considered to be of excellent quality; the dining room can seat up to 58 at a time in two seatings. The ship stopped taking tourists in 2024.

== Notable events ==
On 15 December 2008, the ship was involved in the rescue of Bernard Stamm, whose IMOCA Open 60 racing yacht Cheminées Poujoulat ran aground and sustained significant hull damage near the Kerguelen Islands during the 2008–2009 edition of the Vendée Globe round the world, single-handed yacht race.

On 14 November 2012, Marion Dufresne ran aground as she reached the Crozet Islands as part of its third resupply campaign of the year. The incident resulted in a 25-metre (82 ft) breach in the hull, flooding of two watertight compartments, and disabling of the bow thruster. The crew managed to control the damage and safely returned the vessel out to water. The 110 passengers were evacuated by the on-board helicopter to the small station located on the island. After being assessed for seaworthiness, repairs were effected at the Elgin Brown & Hamer shipyard in Durban, South Africa. A similar accident occurred in 2005.

On 7 December 2016, the ship and its crew rescued Kito de Pavant, a solo French sailor taking part in the 2016–2017 edition of the Vendée Globe. His IMOCA 60 yacht had suffered significant damage to the keel after a collision with a sperm whale approximately 110 nautical miles (200 km; 130 mi) to the north of the Crozet Islands.

In 2019 the ship surveyed the ocean floor near the island of Mayotte, and the results showed the creation of a new 800-metre-high (2,600 ft) underwater seamount that had not existed on maps created three years prior to the new survey.
