= Marc-Joseph Marion du Fresne =

French explorer and cartographer (1724–1772)

Marc-Joseph Marion du Fresne aka Marion Dufresne
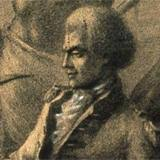
- Du Fresne, as imagined by Charles Meryon
- Born: 22 May 1724; Saint Malo, France
- Died: 12 June 1772 (aged 48); Assassination Cove, Bay of Islands, New Zealand
- Cause of death: Murder
- Occupations: Explorer, navigator, cartographer
- Title: Capitaine de frégate
- Spouse: Julie Bernardine Guilmaut de Beaulieu

Marc-Joseph Marion "Macé" du Fresne (22 May 1724 – 12 June 1772) was a French privateer, East India captain, and explorer. The expedition he led to find the hypothetical Terra Australis in 1771 made important geographic discoveries in the south Indian Ocean and anthropological discoveries in Tasmania and New Zealand. In New Zealand, they spent longer living on shore than any previous European expedition. Half way through the expedition's stay, Marion was killed during a military assault by Ngare Raumati: one of the oldest Māori tribes from the Whangārei region.

He is commemorated with the toponyms Marion Island, South Africa and Marion Bay, Tasmania, as well in the name of two successive French oceanic research and supply vessel the Marion Dufresne (1972) and the Marion Dufresne II, which service the French Southern Territories of Amsterdam Island, the Crozet Islands, the Kerguelen Islands, and Saint Paul Island.

== Early career ==
Marion was born in Saint Malo in 1724 the son of shipowner Julien Marion Dufresne (1681-1739) and his wife Marie Seraphique Le Fer de la Lande. The family was non-noble but wealthy shipowners and merchants. He eventually inherited a farm 'Le Fresne' near the village of Saint-Jean-sur-Vilaine and styled himself Marion Dufresne (or in some instances Dufresne-Marion). He signed as Marc and was also referred to "Macé", probably because of his maternal grandfather Macé Le Fer sieur de la Lande (1640-1710). He was never known as (or signed himself) 'Du Fresne', but this has become a familiar appellation in New Zealand and Tasmania. He first went to sea in 1741 on a voyage to Cadiz aboard the 22-gun Saint-Ésprit.

During the War of the Austrian Succession, Marion commanded several ships as a privateer, including the Prince de Conty where he transported Charles Edward Stuart from Scotland to France. In the Seven Years' War, he was engaged in various naval operations including taking the astronomer Alexandre Guy Pingré to observe the 1761 transit of Venus in the Indian Ocean.

In January 1762, Marion received a grant of 625 argents of land at Quartier Militaire in Mauritius. Although he returned to France in 1764 and 1767, he made the island home in 1768.

== Terra Australis expedition ==
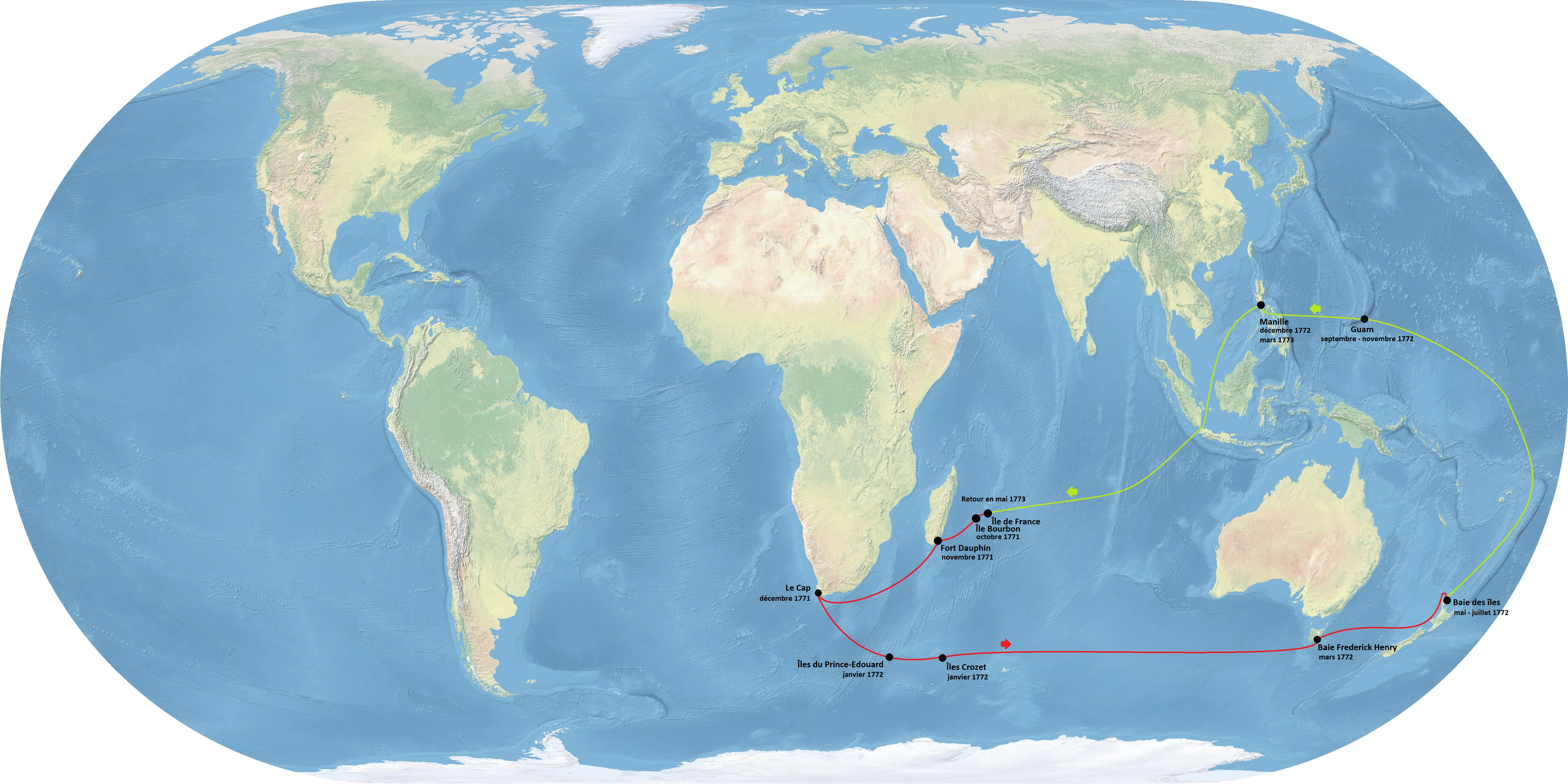
Map showing Marion du Fresne’s final voyage: the expedition’s outward journey to New Zealand and its return after his death.

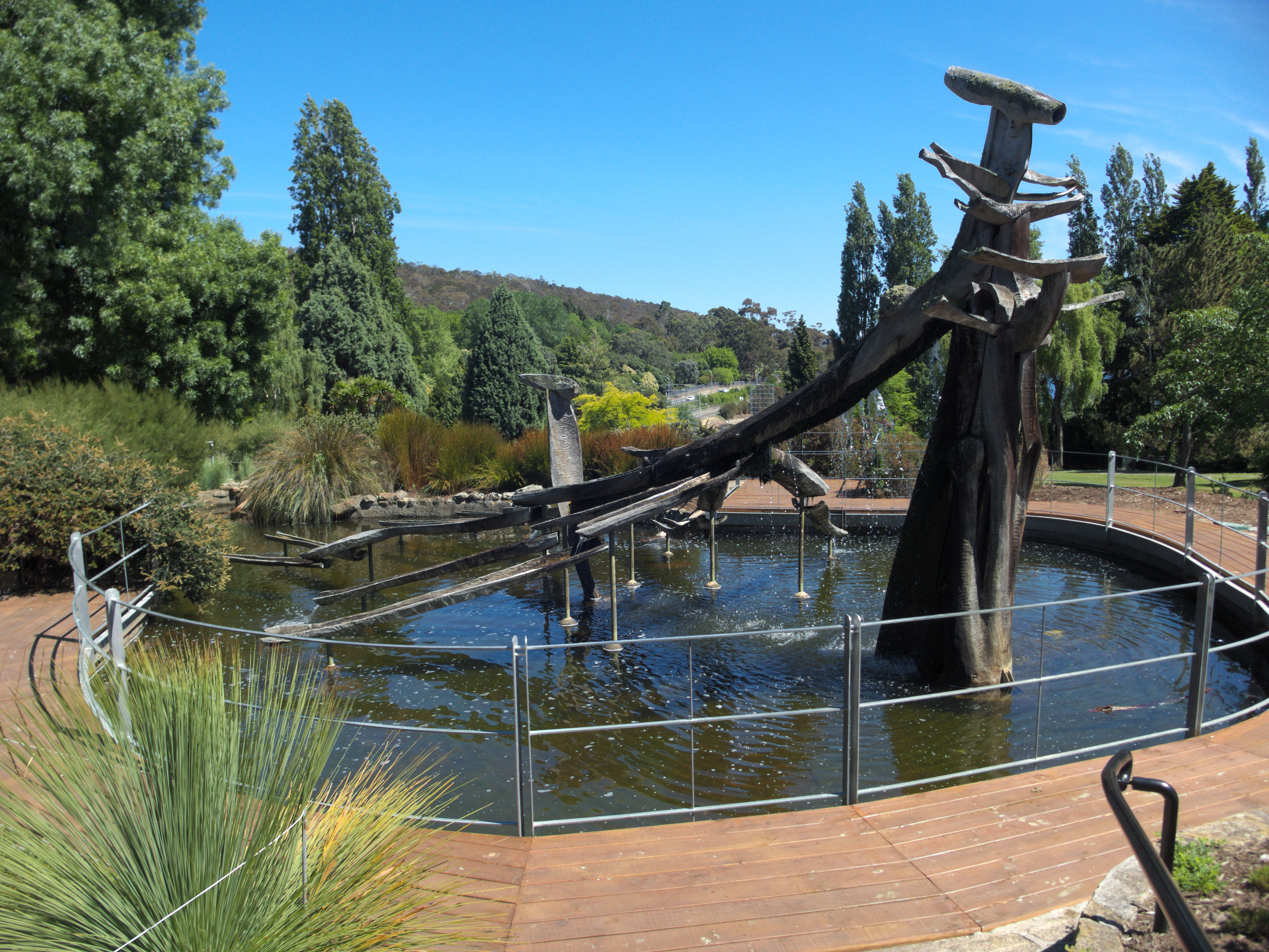
Memorial fountain in Hobart for the bicentenary of the 1772 sighting of Tasmania.

In October 1770, Marion convinced Pierre Poivre, the civil administrator in Port Louis, to equip him with two ships and send him on a twofold mission to the Pacific. Marion's fellow explorer Louis Antoine de Bougainville had recently returned from the Pacific with a Tahitian native, Ahutoru. Marion was tasked with returning Ahutoru to his homeland, and then to explore the south Pacific for the hypothetical Terra Australis Incognita. For these purposes Marion was given two ships, the Mascarin and the Marquis de Castries and departed on 18 October 1771.

Marion spent most of his personal fortune on outfitting the expedition with supplies and a crew. He hoped to make a significant profit on the journey by trading with the reportedly wealthy islands of the South Pacific. No part of Marion's mission could be achieved; Ahutoru died of smallpox shortly after embarkation, and the expedition did not locate Terra Australis nor make a profit from trade. Instead, Marion discovered first the Prince Edward Islands and then the Crozet Islands before sailing towards New Zealand and Australia. His ships spent several days in Tasmania, where Marion Bay in the south-east is named after him. He was the first European to encounter the Aboriginal Tasmanians.

=== Arrival in New Zealand ===
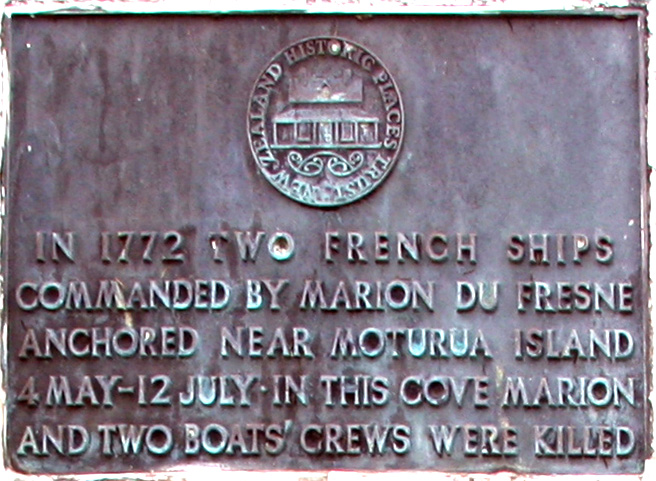
Monument to the memory of Marc-Joseph Marion du Fresne and his party at Te Hue Bay, "Assassination cove".

Marion sighted New Zealand's Mount Taranaki on 25 March 1772, and named the mountain Pic Mascarin without knowing that James Cook had named it "Mount Egmont" three years earlier.

Over the next month, the explorers repaired their two ships and treated their scurvy, first anchoring at Spirits Bay, and later in the Bay of Islands.

According to Du Clesmeur's Journal, their relations with Māori were peaceful at first; they communicated through the Tahitian vocabulary learned from Ahu-tor, and they befriended many Māori including Te Kauri (Te Kuri) of Ngāpuhi iwi (tribe). Nearby natives supplied the French sailors, who had developed scurvy and were on shore in a tent hospital, with daily fish. The sailors were also invited to visit local Māori at their pā – a very rare event – and had slept there overnight. Māori had shown the sailors where a grove of trees were for masts after one had been damaged. Some trees were over 90 feet in height without branches or knots. This masting-camp provided a boost to the sailors who had been disheartened by winter and heavywork. Māori were equally happy to exchange fish and game with the camp.

Du Clesmeur made a detailed study of the habits and customs of Māori during this time. His notes include observations on matters such as diet, utensils, government, religion, marriage, weapons, crop cultivation, navigation, music, and language.

However, there were several alarming incidents between the sailors and Māori. The mast-yard was raided by the natives during the night on 6 June 1772. The natives managed to take a single musket and some clothes before a sentinel fired at the group scaring them off. The next morning, an officer of the Mascarin set fire to a village and charged the chief with the robbery of a 300-pound (140 kg) anchor, a musket, and a greatcoat. The chief, tied to a stake by the officer, refused to admit guilt so Marion ordered the chief to be to be set free and that "in the future a better watch be kept". Du Clesmeur, alarmed by these encounters, discussed the incidents with Marion later on, who brushed the concern off as "he believed them [the natives] incapable of hatching any evil enterprise against us" as Marion had been welcomed into a village only a few days prior where the stolen musket, from the masting-camp, had been returned.

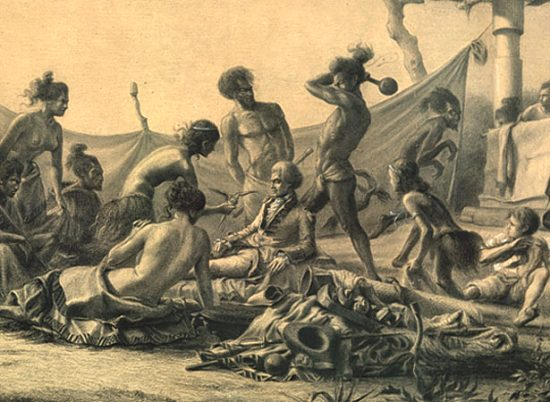
Romantic imagining of the killing of Marc-Joseph Marion du Fresne.

=== Death and reprisals ===
No French witnesses to Marion's death survived and it was some time before his crew were aware of his fate. Two contemporary accounts were written by French officers, Saint Jean Roux and Ambroise du Clesmeur.

During the night of 9 June 1772, French sentries at the hospital camp noticed several natives prowling, along with more around the French masting-camp upon daybreak. A small retinue of Māori arrived with some fish that morning, and Roux noted that the natives were astonished at the blunderbusses he had mounted outside his tent. He noticed a visiting chief taking a close look at the weapons and how they worked, as well as the defences of the camp, and became suspicious of his motives. The chief asked for the guns to be demonstrated, and Roux promptly shot a dog.

On the afternoon of 12 June 1772, Marion and 15 armed sailors went to Te Kauri's village and then went in the captain's gig to go fishing in his favourite fishing area. Marion and 26 men of his crew were subsequently killed. Those killed included de Vaudricourt and Pierre Lehoux (a volunteer), Thomas Ballu of Vannes, Pierre Mauclair (the second pilot) from St Malo, Louis Ménager (the steersman) from Lorient, Vincent Kerneur of Port-Louis, Marc Le Garff from Lorient, Marc Le Corre of Auray, Jean Mestique of Pluvigner, Pierre Cailloche of Languidic, and Mathurin Daumalin of Hillion.

According to Du Clesmeur, the account of Marion's death was from a sole survivor sent by Du Clesmeur to retrieve firewood. This survivor recounted that when the sailors went to work in the morning at the masting-camp, they were attacked by more than 300 natives, murdered before any had time to recover themselves. The sole survivor had only just finished recounting this tale, when Du Clesmeur saw five to six hundred natives on their way to attack the hospital camp nearby. Some of his men were dispatched immediately which scared the attackers off. Marion's cutter was discovered dragged up under a tree nearby.

Roux, meanwhile, held his fire and realised that they had narrowly escaped being killed in their sleep. One chief told Roux that Te Kauri had killed Marion. At this point, longboats full of armed French sailors had arrived with the news that Marion and the sailors had been killed.

In the following days, the French came under relentless attack. The hospital camp was abandoned, and any tools and supplies stolen. Māori villages were burnt down with four principal chiefs killed along with more than five hundred men. More evidence of Marion's death was found as the natives were seen wearing the clothes of Marion and his fellow dead sailors. They were eaten (please check French version of this article for reference).

The French, meanwhile, refocused their efforts on repairing and rebuilding the masts. Roux, Croizet, and Du Clesmeur took joint command undertaking reprisals against Māori over a one-month period as the ships were prepared for departure. A brief reprieve was disturbed with an attack by around fifty Māori who eventually fled after a narrow skirmish having suffered their own losses.

On the 7th of July, Du Clesmeur ordered Te Kauri's village burned. Roux and Du Clesmeur searched the village finding more evidence of Marion and his crew's deaths: human bones charred from a fire, intestines concealed under rubbish, and a coat belonging to one of the men with spear holes. The village had been entirely deserted apart from a single old man who was shot by one of the sailors in retaliation. The pair also traveled to the place where the massacre had taken place but could not find anything apart from ruins of their boats.

The expedition finally left on 12 July 1772. The French buried a bottle at Waipoa on Moturua, containing the arms of France and a formal statement taking possession of the whole country, with the name of France Australe.

Both published and unpublished accounts of Marion's death circulated widely, giving New Zealand a bad reputation as a dangerous land unsuitable for colonisation, and challenged the stereotypes of Pacific Islanders as noble savages which were prevalent in Europe at that time.

=== Possible motives for military assault ===
There are several possible motives for the Māori assault on the landing site: Te Kauri (Te Kuri) considered that Marion was a threat to his authority, Te Kauri became concerned at the economic effect of supplying food for the two crews, Marion's crew, possibly unwittingly, broke several tapu laws related to their lack of required rituals before the cutting down of kauri trees, or the breaking of tapu by fishing in Manawaora Bay.

An account told by a Ngāpuhi elder to John White (ethnographer 1826–1891), but not published until 1965, describes Te Kauri and Tohitapu as leading the military resolution to the landing. Tapu had been placed on Manawaora Bay after members of the local tribe drowned here some time earlier, and their bodies had been washed up at Te Kauri's (Tacoury's sic) Cove. Since the interlopers did not leave, a military resolution was required.

== See also ==
- List of massacres in New Zealand
- Mont Marion-Dufresne

== Bibliography ==
- Beaglehole, J.C., ed. (1968). The Journals of Captain James Cook on His Voyages of Discovery, vol. I: The Voyage of the Endeavour 1768–1771. Cambridge University Press. OCLC 223185477.
- Edward Duyker (ed.) The Discovery of Tasmania: Journal Extracts from the Expeditions of Abel Janszoon Tasman and Marc-Joseph Marion Dufresne 1642 & 1772, St David's Park Publishing/Tasmanian Government Printing Office, Hobart, 1992, pp. 106, ISBN 0-7246-2241-1.
- Edward Duyker, An Officer of the Blue: Marc-Joseph Marion Dufresne 1724–1772, South Sea Explorer, Melbourne University Press, Melbourne, 1994, pp. 229, ISBN 0-522-84565-7.
- Edward Duyker, Marc-Joseph Marion Dufresne, un marin malouin à la découvertes des mers australes, traduction française de Maryse Duyker (avec l'assistance de Maurice Recq et l'auteur), Les Portes du Large, Rennes, 2010, pp. 352, ISBN 978-2-914612-14-2.
- Edward Duyker, 'Marion Dufresne, Marc-Joseph (1724–1772)' , Australian Dictionary of Biography, Supplementary Volume, Melbourne University Press, 2005, pp 258–259.
- Kelly, Leslie G. (1951). Marion Dufresne at the Bay of Islands. Wellington: Reed.
- Salmond, Anne (1991). Two worlds : first meetings between Māori and Europeans, 1642–1772. Auckland, N.Z.: Viking. ISBN 0-670-83298-7. OCLC 26545658.
