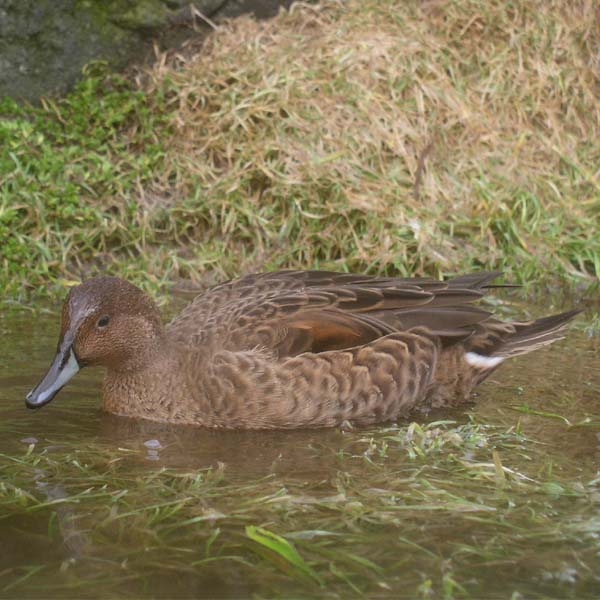

Conservation status
- Least Concern (IUCN 3.1)

Scientific classification
- Kingdom: Animalia
- Phylum: Chordata
- Class: Aves
- Order: Anseriformes
- Family: Anatidae
- Genus: Anas
- Species: A. eatoni

Binomial name
- Anas eatoni (Sharpe, 1875)

Subspecies
- A. e. eatoni (Sharpe, 1875) (Kerguelen pintail); A. e. drygalskii (Reichenow, 1875) (Crozet pintail)

Synonyms
- Dafila eatoni

= Eaton's pintail =

Species of bird

Eaton's pintail (Anas eatoni) is a dabbling duck of the genus Anas. It is also known as the southern pintail. The species is restricted to the island groups of Kerguelen and Crozet in the southern Indian Ocean. It resembles a small female northern pintail. It was named after the English explorer and naturalist Alfred Edwin Eaton. It is threatened by introduced species, particularly feral cats, which prey on it, particularly during the post-breeding molt, when it is unable to fly.

== Taxonomy ==
While previously considered a subspecies of northern pintail, the Eaton's pintail is much smaller (one female Eaton's pintail weighed 450 g, while the mean mass of female northern pintails is 871 g) and the male Eaton's pintail is female-like in patterning, unlike the sexually dimorphic northern pintail.

The species was described by Richard Bowdler Sharpe based on specimens collected by Alfred Edwin Eaton. In addition to Eaton's specimens, Sharpe also noted that earlier specimens were collected during the Ross expedition.

There are two subspecies: A. eatoni eatoni (Kerguelen pintail) and A. eatoni drygalskii (Crozet pintail).

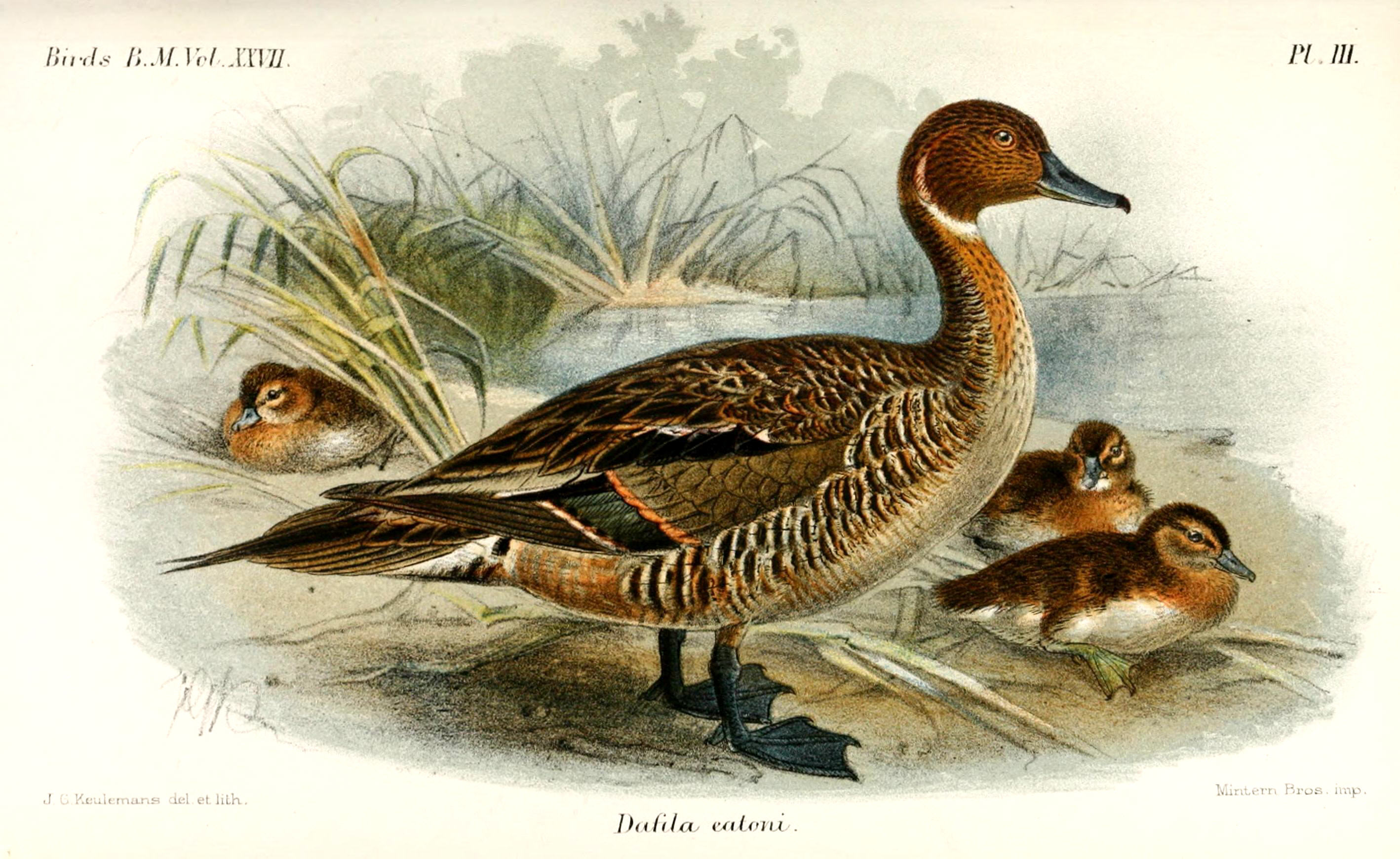
With ducklings, illustration by Keulemans, 1895

== Description ==
The Eaton's pintail is a small duck, 35-45 cm in length, with a 65-70 cm wingspan and weighing 430-502 g in males and 400-500 g in females. Its adult male and female plumage is similarly brownish overall with cinnamon underparts, though the two sexes can be separated by the color of the speculum (green in males and brown in females) and the longer central rectrices in males. Juveniles are similar to adults in plumage, but more streaked below.

== Distribution and habitat ==
The Eaton's pintail is found exclusively on Kerguelen and Crozet Islands, though it has appeared as a vagrant on the nearby Prince Edward Islands. It summers on small lakes, pools, marshes, and other freshwater wetlands, then migrates down to coastal bays in the winter when most freshwater bodies freeze over.

== Behavior ==
The Eaton's pintail's diet mostly consists of small crustaceans and other invertebrates, but will also forage on seeds. It occasionally visits southern elephant seal wallows to feed.

It breeds from November to March. Its nest is built in tussock or grass, and lined with moss and down.

This pintail's vocalization is similar to the northern pintail's: a soft proop-proop whistle in males and a quack in females, but higher-pitched and quieter.

The brown skua is a primary predator of the Eaton's pintail, especially during its post-breeding molt when it is flightless. During this period, Eaton's pintails will often shelter themselves in dense vegetation or caves.

== Status ==
Listed as Least Concern by the IUCN. While the population is decreasing, there have been no precipitous drops due to predation from invasive species (e.g., cats and rats) as was once assumed. An introduction attempt on Île Amsterdam was unsuccessful, with no sightings since 1970.
