= Crozet Islands =

Archipelago in the subantarctic French territories

Crozet Islands Îles Crozet (French)
- Flag of the French Southern and Antarctic Lands Coat of arms
- Motto: "Liberté, égalité, fraternité" (French) (English: "Liberty, equality, fraternity")
- Anthem: La Marseillaise ("The Marseillaise")
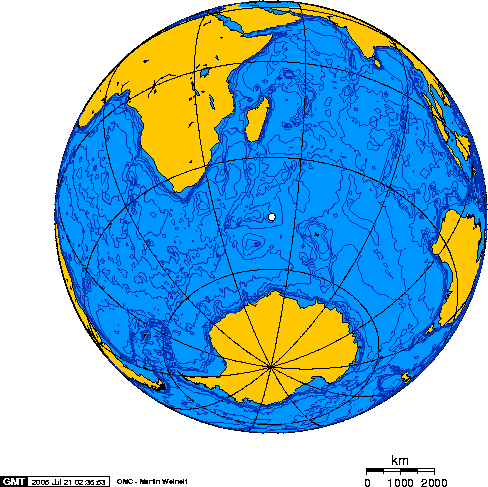
- Orthographic projection centred over the Îles Crozet.
- Status: District of French Southern and Antarctic Lands

Crozet Islands
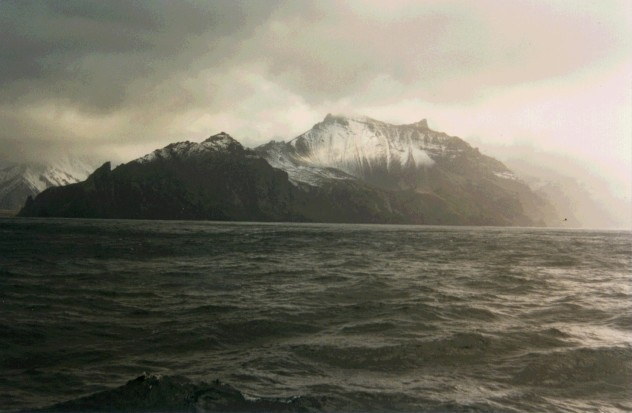
- One of the Crozet Islands

- Location within Indian Ocean

Geography
- Location: Indian Ocean
- Coordinates: 46°22′48″S 51°40′12″E
- Archipelago: Crozet Islands
- Total islands: 6
- Major islands: 3
- Area: 352 km^{2} (136 sq mi)
- Highest elevation: 1,090 m (3580 ft)
- Highest point: Mont Marion-Dufresne

Administration
- France
- Overseas Territory: French Southern and Antarctic Lands
- District: Crozet Islands

Demographics
- Population: 18 (winter); 30 (summer)

UNESCO World Heritage Site
- Part of: French Austral Lands and Seas
- Criteria: Natural: vii, ix, x
- Reference: 1603bis-001
- Inscription: 2019 (43rd Session)

The Crozet Islands (French: Îles Crozet French pronunciation: [il kʁozɛ]; or, officially, Archipel Crozet [aʁʃipɛl -]) are a sub-Antarctic archipelago of small islands in the southern Indian Ocean. They form one of the five administrative districts of the French Southern and Antarctic Lands.

== History ==
=== Discovery and early history ===
The Crozet Islands were discovered on 24 January 1772, by the expedition of French explorer Marc-Joseph Marion du Fresne, aboard Le Mascarin. His second-in-command, Julien-Marie Crozet, landed on Île de la Possession, claiming the archipelago for France. In 1776, Crozet met James Cook at Cape Town, at the start of Cook's third voyage. Crozet shared the charts of his ill-fated expedition, and as Cook sailed eastward, he stopped at the islands, naming the western group Marion and the eastern group Crozet. In the following years, sealers visiting the islands referred to both the eastern and western groups as the Crozet Islands, and Marion Island became the name of the larger of the two Prince Edward Islands, which had been discovered by Captain Marion on the same expedition.

In the early 19th century, the islands were often visited by sealers, and the seals had been nearly exterminated by 1835. Between 1804 and 1911, 153 vessels visited the island for seals, seven of which wrecked on the coast. Subsequently, whaling was the main activity around the islands, especially by the whalers from Massachusetts. In 1841, there were a dozen whaleships around the islands. Within a couple of years, this had increased to twenty from the United States alone. Such exploitation was short-lived, and the islands were rarely visited for the rest of the century. The islands were uninhabited during the late 19th century.

There were many shipwrecks on the Crozet Islands. The British sealer, Princess of Wales, sank in 1821, and the survivors spent two years on the islands. A castaway wrote 'The land affords no shelter whatever, there being neither tree nor shrub, and the weather is at most times extremely wet, and snow frequently on the ground'. In 1825 the Aventure was wrecked and 7 men survived. The Strathmore was wrecked in 1875 and 44 people survived on a small island for 7 months. In 1887, the French Tamaris was wrecked and her crew stranded on Île des Cochons. They tied a note to the leg of an albatross, which was found seven months later in Fremantle, Western Australia, but the crew was never recovered. For some time, the Royal Navy dispatched a ship every few years to look for stranded survivors. The steamship Australasian also checked for survivors en route to Australia.

=== Recent history ===
Between 1924 and 1955, France administered the islands as a dependency of Madagascar. In 1938, the Crozet Islands were declared a nature reserve. The Crozet Islands became part of the French Southern Territories in 1955. In 1961, the first research station was set up, but it was not until 1963 that the permanent station Alfred Faure opened at Port Alfred on Île de la Possession (both named after the first leader of the station). The station is staffed by 18 to 30 people (varying by season). They perform meteorological, biological, and geological research, and maintain a seismograph and a geomagnetic observatory (IAGA code: CZT). The Comprehensive Nuclear Test Ban Treaty Organization has listening equipment on the island and it was disclosed that two of its stations, the other being on Ascension Island, detected what is believed to be an underwater, non-nuclear explosion off the coast of Argentina and believed to be the fatal accident of the ARA San Juan submarine in 2017.

== Geology ==
The islands lie on the Antarctic Plate, roughly between the Kerguelen hotspot and Madagascar and southern Africa. The oldest island, Île de l'Est, formed roughly 9 million years ago from a hotspot, which has continued forming islands to the west until, ostensibly, the present. Despite this apparently young age, no volcanic activity has been observed to date on any of the islands.

== Geography ==
Not including minor islets or rock reefs etc., the Crozet group consists of six islands. From west to east:

| No. | Island or Group (English) | Area | Highest Peak | Location |
|---|---|---|---|---|
L'Occidental (Western Group)
| 1 | Île aux Cochons (Pig Island) | 67 km^{2} (26 sq mi) | Mont Richard-Foy, 853 m (2,799 ft) | 46°06′09″S 50°13′54″E |
| 2 | Île des Pingouins (Penguin Island, literally Auk Island) | 3 km^{2} (1.2 sq mi) | Mont des Manchots 340 m (1,115 ft) | 46°25′01″S 50°24′10″E |
| 3 | Îlots des Apôtres (Apostle Islets)^{(1)} | 2 km^{2} (0.8 sq mi) | Mont Pierre, 289 m (948 ft) | 45°57′18″S 50°25′30″E |
L'Oriental (Eastern Group)
| 4 | Île de la Possession (Possession Island) | 150 km^{2} (58 sq mi) | Pic du Mascarin, 934 m (3,064 ft) | 46°24′27″S 51°45′27″E |
| 5 | Île de l'Est (East Island) | 130 km^{2} (50 sq mi) | Mont Marion-Dufresne, 1,090 m (3,576 ft) | 46°25′48″S 52°12′27″E |
| | Îles Crozet (Crozet Islands) | 352 km^{2} (136 sq mi) | Mont Marion-Dufresne, 1,090 m (3,576 ft) | 45°57' to 46°29'S; 50°10' to 52°19'E |

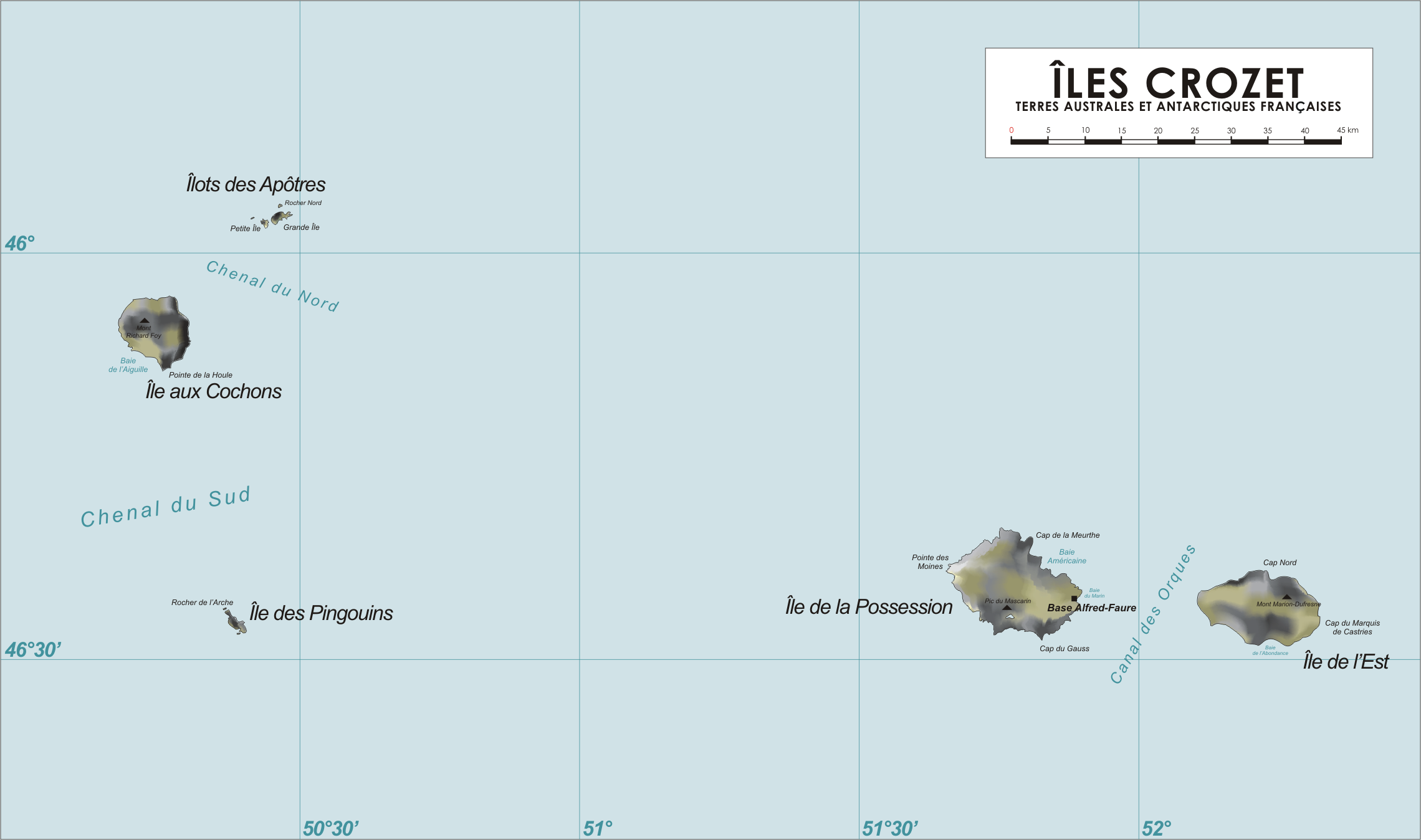
Map of the Crozet Islands

^{(1)} Group of two major islands (Grande Île—Big Island, and Petite Île—Little Island) and about 20 pinnacle rocks.

The Eastern and Western Groups are 94.5 km (51 nmi) apart (from Île des Pingouins to Île de la Possession).

The Crozet Islands are uninhabited except for the research station Alfred Faure (Port Alfred) on the east side of Île de la Possession, which has been continuously staffed since 1963. Previous scientific stations included La Grande Manchotière and La Petite Manchotière.

=== Climate ===
The Crozet Islands have a maritime-influenced tundra climate (Köppen climate classification, ET). Monthly temperatures average around 2.9 °C (37 °F) and 7.9 °C (46 °F) in winter and summer, respectively. Precipitation is high, with over 2,000 mm (78.7 in) per year. It rains on average 300 days a year, and winds exceeding 100 km/h (62 mph) occur on 100 days a year. The temperatures may rise to 18 °C (64.4 °F) in summer and rarely go below −5 °C (23 °F), even in winter.

Climate data for Alfred Faure (1981–2010)
| Month | Jan | Feb | Mar | Apr | May | Jun | Jul | Aug | Sep | Oct | Nov | Dec | Year |
|---|---|---|---|---|---|---|---|---|---|---|---|---|---|
| Record high °C (°F) | 22.4 (72.3) | 21.7 (71.1) | 21.2 (70.2) | 19.7 (67.5) | 16.5 (61.7) | 16.0 (60.8) | 14.9 (58.8) | 16.4 (61.5) | 15.4 (59.7) | 17.5 (63.5) | 19.7 (67.5) | 20.7 (69.3) | 22.4 (72.3) |
| Mean daily maximum °C (°F) | 10.4 (50.7) | 11.0 (51.8) | 10.1 (50.2) | 9.1 (48.4) | 7.2 (45.0) | 6.1 (43.0) | 6.0 (42.8) | 5.4 (41.7) | 5.8 (42.4) | 6.8 (44.2) | 7.8 (46.0) | 9.2 (48.6) | 7.9 (46.2) |
| Daily mean °C (°F) | 7.5 (45.5) | 8.1 (46.6) | 7.4 (45.3) | 6.5 (43.7) | 4.9 (40.8) | 3.8 (38.8) | 3.7 (38.7) | 3.2 (37.8) | 3.3 (37.9) | 4.1 (39.4) | 5.0 (41.0) | 6.3 (43.3) | 5.3 (41.5) |
| Mean daily minimum °C (°F) | 4.5 (40.1) | 5.2 (41.4) | 4.8 (40.6) | 3.9 (39.0) | 2.5 (36.5) | 1.5 (34.7) | 1.4 (34.5) | 0.9 (33.6) | 0.8 (33.4) | 1.3 (34.3) | 2.3 (36.1) | 3.3 (37.9) | 2.7 (36.9) |
| Record low °C (°F) | 0.0 (32.0) | 0.7 (33.3) | −0.4 (31.3) | −1.7 (28.9) | −2.5 (27.5) | −3.7 (25.3) | −5.0 (23.0) | −4.7 (23.5) | −6.6 (20.1) | −3.9 (25.0) | −2.8 (27.0) | −1.9 (28.6) | −6.6 (20.1) |
| Average precipitation mm (inches) | 127.8 (5.03) | 129.1 (5.08) | 146.2 (5.76) | 160.2 (6.31) | 186.2 (7.33) | 131.7 (5.19) | 139.2 (5.48) | 157.3 (6.19) | 163.6 (6.44) | 156.2 (6.15) | 147.9 (5.82) | 142.0 (5.59) | 1,782.5 (70.18) |
| Average precipitation days (≥ 1.0 mm) | 12.97 | 11.64 | 13.37 | 15.89 | 16.54 | 14.85 | 15.81 | 16.04 | 14.75 | 13.86 | 12.92 | 14.88 | 172.91 |
| Mean monthly sunshine hours | 96.6 | 74.7 | 65.4 | 10.9 | 17.1 | 14.8 | 30.8 | 41.9 | 46.1 | 62.1 | 80.1 | 63.2 | 600.4 |
Source: Meteo climat

=== Flora and fauna ===
The islands are part of the Southern Indian Ocean Islands tundra ecoregion that includes several subantarctic islands. In this cold climate, plant life is mainly limited to grasses, mosses and lichens, while the main animals are insects along with large populations of seabirds, seals and penguins.

The Crozet Islands are home to four species of penguins. Most abundant are the macaroni penguin, of which some 2 million pairs breed on the islands, and the king penguin, home to 700,000 breeding pairs; half the world's population. The eastern rockhopper penguin also can be found, and there is a small colony of gentoo penguins. There is also an endemic subspecies of the duck Eaton's pintail. Other birds include black-faced sheathbills, petrels, and albatross, including the wandering albatross.

Mammals living on the Crozet Islands include fur seals and southern elephant seals. Killer whales have been observed preying upon the seals. The transient killer whales of the Crozet Islands are famous for intentionally beaching (and later un-stranding) themselves while actively hunting the islands' breeding seal population. This is a very rare behaviour, most often seen in the Patagonia region of Argentina, and is thought to be a learned skill passed down through generations of individual orca families. These killer whales also seem to stay around the Crozet Islands year-round, feeding on mostly seals during the summer, and then feeding on penguins for the winter.

The Crozet Islands have been a nature reserve since 1938. Introduction of foreign species (mice, rats, and subsequently cats for pest control) has caused severe damage to the original ecosystem. The pigs that had been introduced on Île des Cochons and the goats brought to Île de la Possession—both as a food resource—have been exterminated.

Another on-going concern is overfishing of the Patagonian toothfish, as well as the albatross population, which is being monitored. The waters of the Crozet Islands are patrolled by the French government.

== In popular culture ==
A 2012 French film, Les Saveurs du Palais, begins and ends with scenes in the Crozet Islands. The film's protagonist, a grandmotherly chef from the Périgord region of France who signed on as cook for the research station, had once been the personal chef to President François Mitterrand.

In the 1978 novel Desolation Island, the fifth book in Patrick O'Brian's Aubrey–Maturin series, the fictional naval vessel HMS Leopard is severely damaged by a collision with an iceberg in the southwestern Indian Ocean. The crew attempts to make landfall for repairs on one of the Crozet Islands, but they miss the island and continue to drift towards the east, unable to reverse direction.

In Herman Melville's Moby-Dick, the Pequod sails near the ‘distant Crozetts’, ’a good cruising ground for Right Whalemen’ in Chapter 52, ‘The Albatross’. See also chapter 58, ’Brit’.

Biggles Cuts it Fine by Captain W. E. Johns is set mainly in the Crozet Islands, where a fictional Russian base is discovered on, what is called in the book, “Hog Island”.

== Gallery ==
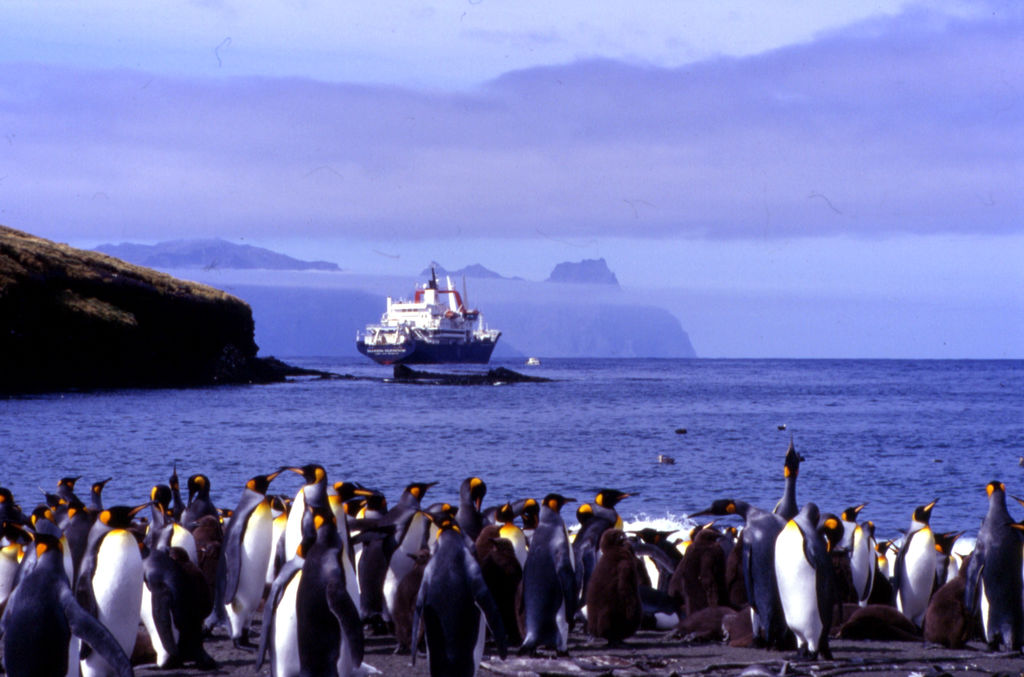
The Marion Dufresne off the "port" of Crozet. East Island in the background.

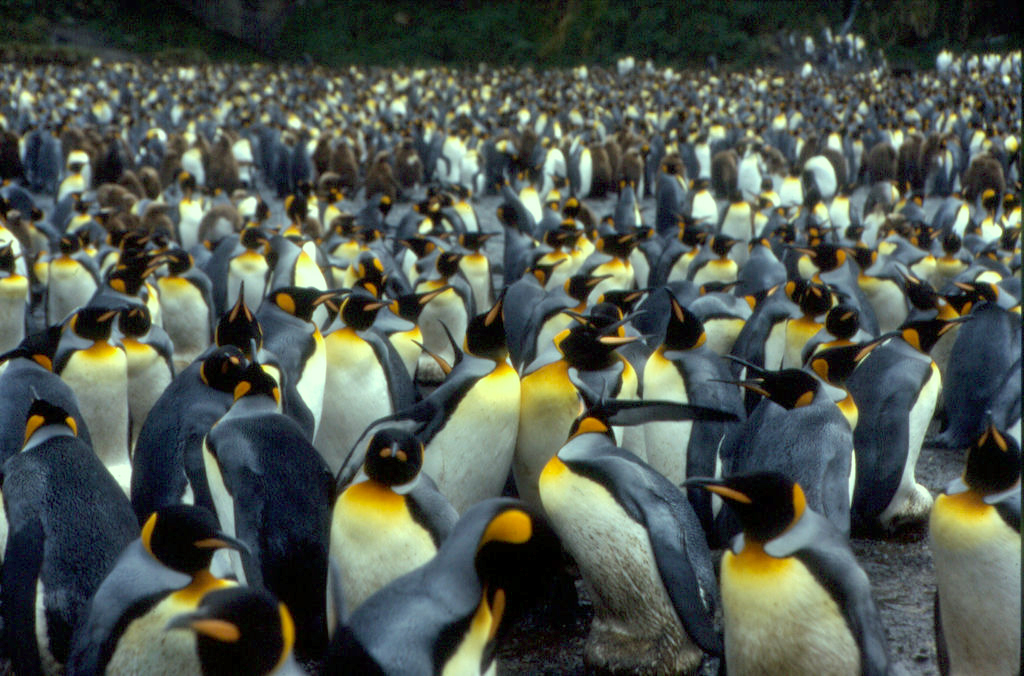
One of the penguin colonies of the islands

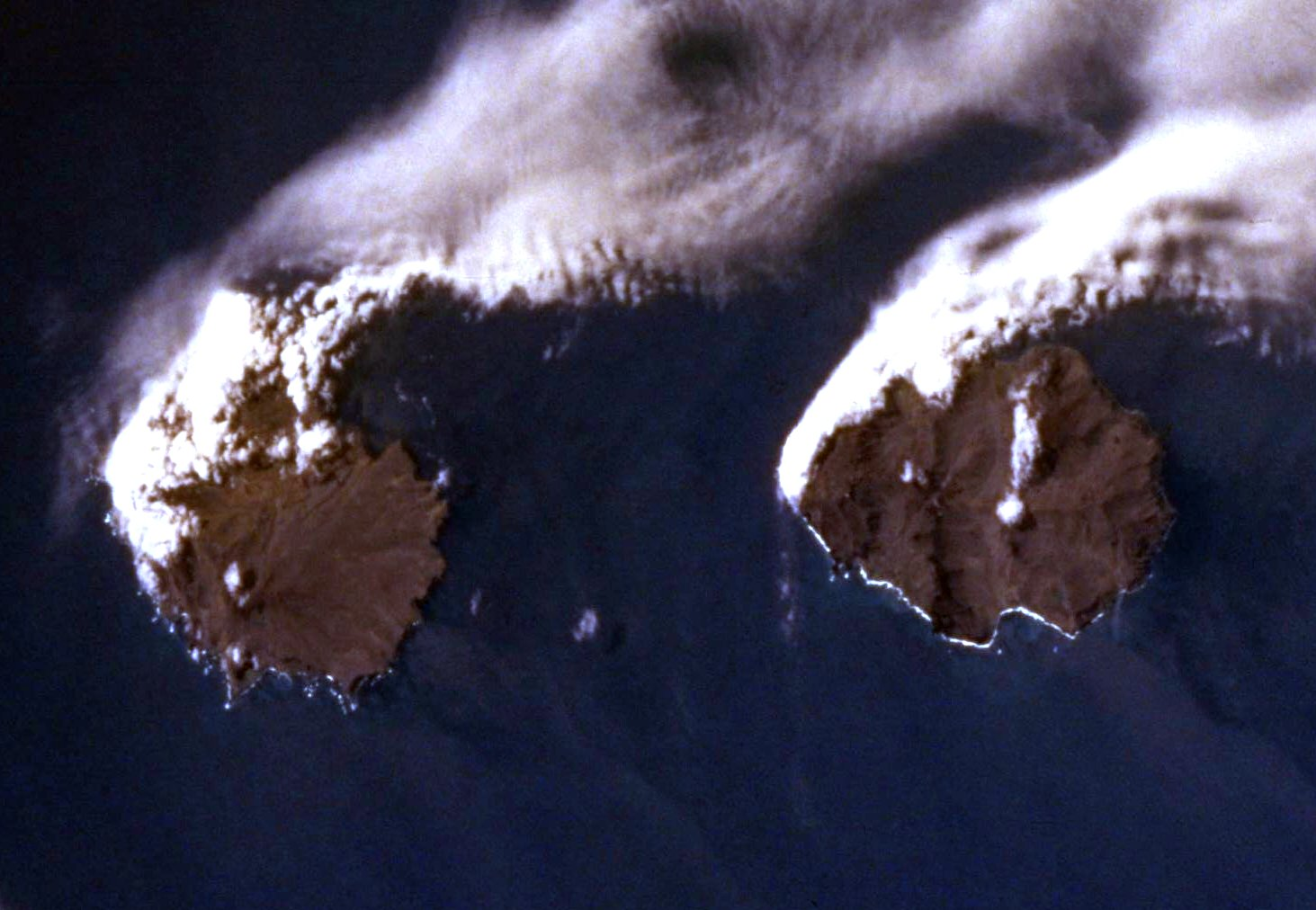
The Eastern Group as seen from outer space in December 1998.

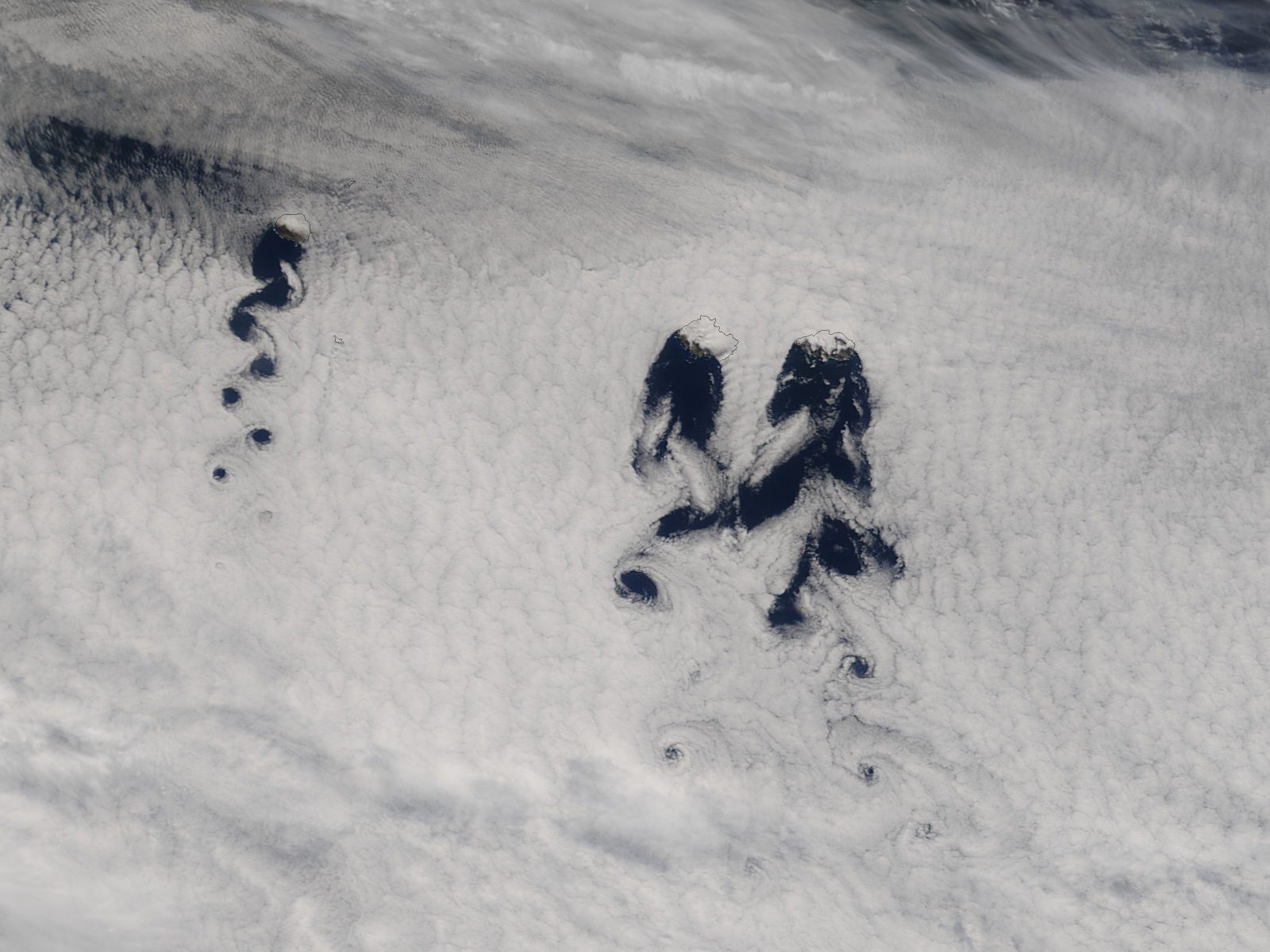
Crozet Islands causing a von Kármán vortex street to form under low clouds.

== See also ==
- Administrative divisions of France
- Kerguelen Islands
- List of Antarctic and subantarctic islands
- List of French overseas islands
- List of volcanoes in French Southern and Antarctic Lands
- Overseas France
- Prince Edward Islands
