= David Lewis Gifford =

American soldier and whaler, recipient of the Medal of Honor (1844–1904)

David L. Gifford
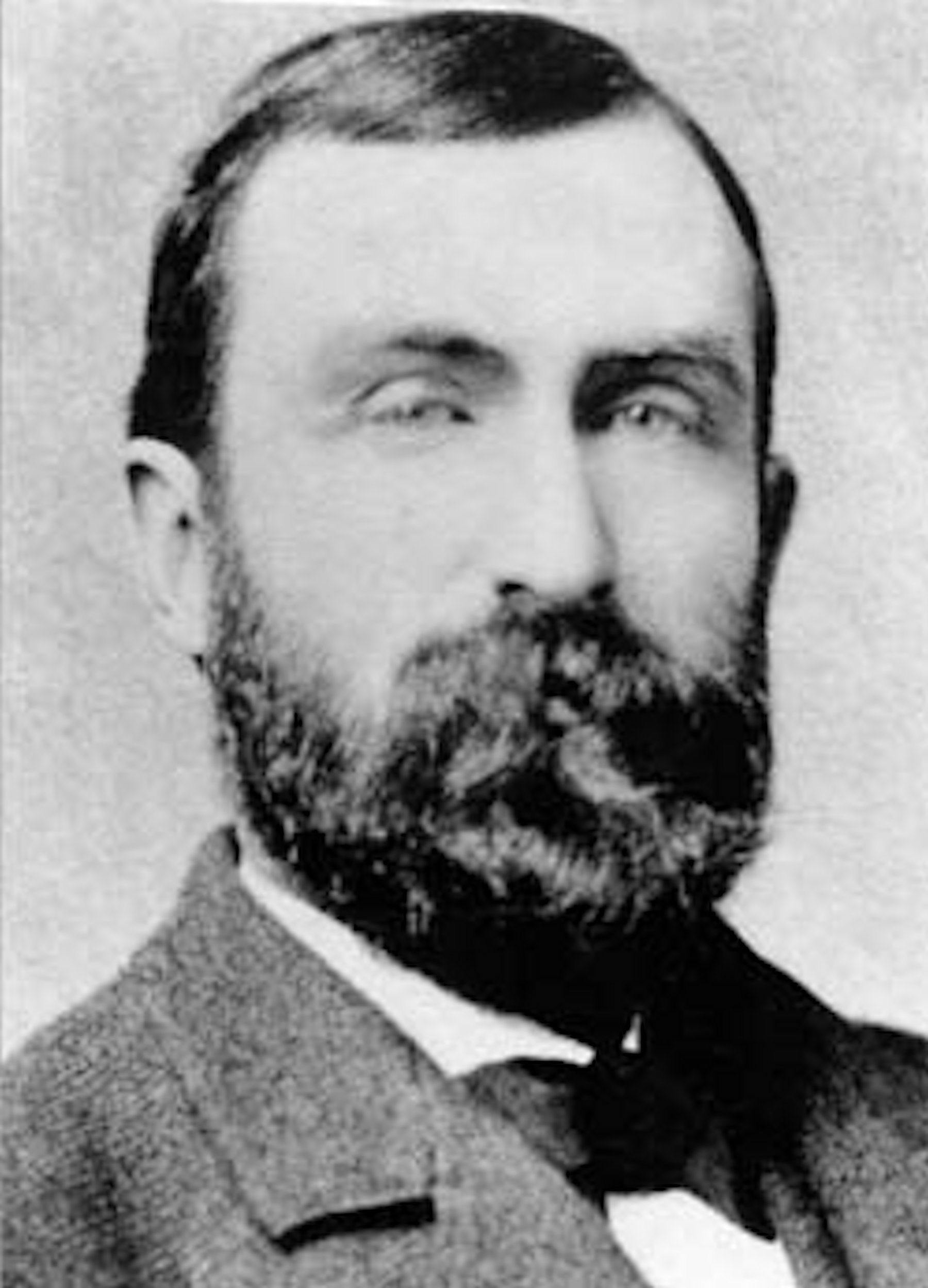
- Medal of Honor winner David Lewis Gifford
- Born: September 18, 1844; Dartmouth, Massachusetts
- Died: January 13, 1904 (aged 59); Dartmouth, Massachusetts
- Burial place: South Dartmouth Cemetery, Dartmouth, Massachusetts
- Military career
- Allegiance: United States of America
- Branch: United States Army; Union Army; United States Navy; Union Navy
- Service years: 1863 – 1864 (Army); 1864 – 1865 (Navy)
- Rank: Private (Army); Ordinary seaman (Navy)
- Units: Company B, 4th Massachusetts Volunteer Cavalry
- Conflicts: American Civil War
- Awards: Medal of Honor

David Lewis Gifford (September 18, 1844 – January 13, 1904) was a Union Army soldier in the American Civil War who received the U.S. military's highest decoration, the Medal of Honor. He was awarded the Medal of Honor, for extraordinary heroism shown on May 24, 1864, while serving as a Private with Company B, 4th Massachusetts Volunteer Cavalry, at Ashepoo River, South Carolina. His Medal of Honor was issued on January 21, 1897. He received his Medal of Honor following the steamer the USS Boston running aground on an Oyster bed, leaving 400 individuals within range of Confederate artillery. Gifford and four other men - led by George W. Brush - manned a small boat and ferried stranded soldiers to a safe area.

== Life ==
=== Early life ===
Gifford was born in Dartmouth, Massachusetts on September 18, 1844, and joined the Army in December 1863. He was transferred to the Navy in June 1864, and was discharged with the rank of ordinary seaman in August 1865.

David Lewis Gifford was born to Mercy Kendrick and David Gifford in a farmhouse at the head of the Apponagansett River. He lost two of his siblings within a few weeks, however his sister Amy survived to adulthood. When Gifford was 16 he took out his protection papers, indicating he was about to go to sea. This may have been influenced by the fact that his neighbors - the Wings - were well known in the whaling industry.

=== Civil war service ===
Three years after taking out his protection papers, at the age of nineteen, Gifford enlisted with the Four Regiment Massachusetts Volunteer Cavalry, Company B. Under Major David B. Keith. The company was newly raised and composed mostly of New Bedford area men. Giffords father, who was often on the Dartmouth militia rolls, died of heart disease a month after Gifford enlisted. Gifford signed his enlistment paper on November 3, 1863. On March 20, 1864, his unit sailed out of Boston aboard the steamer Western Metropolis. The steamer arrived at Hilton Head, South Carolina on April 1, 1864, where they were assigned to the department of the South headquartered there. In Giffords company was also John H. Ricketson, a clerk from Dartmouth who had transferred from Company F 3rd MV Infantry. Giffords company was organized and sent to the front following President Lincoln's calls for 200,000 men on February 1 and March 14, 1864, along with the 5th cavalry regiment and 3 light battalions, 5 regiments, and 9 infantry companies - all from Massachusetts.

On 24 May 1864, the United States paddle-wheel steamer USS Boston left Hilton Head, South Carolina. The ship carried 300 men, and 80 horses and was part of a larger plan to cut off Confederate railroads connecting Savannah, Georgia to Charleston, South Carolina. Under orders to follow a smaller ship down the Ashepoo River, the ship missed its turn off of the Ashepoo and became stuck on a sandbar. By one in the morning the Confederate Military in the area had congregated at Chapmans Fort with heavy artillery. The Boston was trapped directly in front of the Confederate fort and was practically indefensible. two rebel 6-pounder guns hit the Boston with over one hundred shots. U.S. Army 1st Lt. George Washington Brush boarded a gunboat with 25 armed men from the 4th Massachusetts Cavalry Regiment to assist the Boston as sharpshooters. However, once they boarded the boat the Confederate artillery resumed fire and the gunboats captain refused to go any further. Brush took the only small boat available from the Boston and asked for four volunteers to help rescue the soldiers on board the ship. Gifford immediately volunteered, along with his two closest friends in the military, William Downey, and John Duffey, as well as Patrick Scanlan. All from the New Bedford area. Under heavy Confederate sharpshooter and artillery fire the five men ferried the men on board the Boston - mostly from the 34th United States Colored Infantry Regiment - to safety. Each of the men took a pair of oars and made their way to the sunken ship. Soldiers on the Boston were leaping off of the ship to escape rebel fire. Once they boarded the rescue craft the Confederates switched to that ship as their principal target. The boat, which could only carry thirty men per load, was peppered with fire. They lost several soldiers onboard and came close to floundering several times. After getting all the soldiers safely from the Boston to the south side of the river they set fire and burned the steamer to the ground. All five men involved in the rescue received Medals of Honor.

Following his heroics at the Ashepoo River, Gifford transferred from the cavalry to the Navy on June 8, 1864. He would serve aboard the USS Braziliera until May 1, 1865. While serving on the vessel he participated in expeditions into Simon's Sound, Georgia. The ship penetrated around 40 miles inland and destroyed salt works, liberated slaves, and burned 1,300 pounds of sea-island cotton. In April 1865 the Braziliera was sent north, Gifford left the ships crew and from May 2 to June 17, 1865, he served on the Princeton, from June 18 to August 14, 1865, he served aboard the 1,150 ton steamship South Carolina.

=== Postwar voyages and adventures ===
Gifford was the captain of the China from June 1872 until April 1874.

On July 1, 1875, Gifford was the captain on a whaling ship, the Young Phoenix, that saved the lives of several passengers on the Strathmore, which had run aground near Madagascar on the Crozet Islands in the Indian Ocean. The Strathmore was travelling from London to New Zealand when it ran aground on a volcanic island. 45 of the 89 passengers and crew had died before Gifford arrived. He had noticed the ship's passengers' signal and ferried the stranded passengers to the ship over the course of two days. The first day, he ordered that the only woman who survived the shipwreck be brought aboard the Young Phoenix- Fanny Wordsworth, who met with Gifford's wife, Eleanor J. Gifford, who had accompanied him on the voyage. According to Wordsworth, the previous night she had had a premonition and had seen Eleanor Gifford's face in a dream. The ship was too crowded, however, and Gifford transferred twenty of the Strathmore's passengers to the Sierra Morena. Earlier in the voyage, Gifford had picked up 30 passengers from a derelict ship,.

He was later honored by the people of Mauritius with the Mauritius Medal for the rescue. He was also honored by the Massachusetts Humane Society with a silver medal. He was also awarded a silver cup. He was partially reimbursed by the Parliament of the United Kingdom with a plate worth £21, led by Charles Adderley. Additionally, the New Zealand government awarded him a gold watch.

In mid July 1881 Gifford was shipwrecked on the Daniel Webster five miles south of Point Barrow, Alaska. The ship was crushed by ice and sank. After the Daniel Webster sank, Gifford talked with an Inuk who informed him that another ship, the Jeanette, had also sunk nearby. Gifford then travelled south to Point Belcher, where he transferred to the Coral. He changed ship again, to the schooner R. B. Handy of San Francisco. On that ship he went south to Saint Lawrence Bay, Chukotka, where the Russian ship Strelock had arrived 48 hours earlier. Gifford conveyed the information he had learned about the Jeanette to the Russian ship, before returning home to the New Bedford area.

In 1884, Gifford reenlisted in the navy and participated in the rescue of the Lady Franklin Bay Polar Expedition as an ice master on HMS Alert. In his report on the rescue, Rear Admiral Winfield Scott Schley called out Gifford as giving him assistance during the expedition. However, differing opinions on ship discipline required Schley to discharge Gifford after returning to the United States.

Gifford died at the age of 59, on January 13, 1904.

== Legacy ==
Gifford was buried at the South Dartmouth Cemetery in Dartmouth, Massachusetts. Where he was honored with a marker. He was additionally honored with a statue outside the Dartmouth Middle School, a project spearheaded by Dartmouth natives Doris Copley, and Beverly Morrison Glennon. His heroics were also the subject of a local television film in Dartmouth.

== Medal of Honor citation ==
The President of the United States of America, in the name of Congress, takes pleasure in presenting the Medal of Honor to Private David L. Gifford, United States Army, for extraordinary heroism on 24 May 1864, while serving with Company B, 4th Massachusetts Cavalry, in action at Ashepoo River, South Carolina. Private Gifford volunteered as a member of a boat crew which went to the rescue of a large number of Union soldiers on board the stranded steamer Boston and with great gallantry assisted in conveying them to shore, being exposed during the entire time to a heavy fire from a Confederate battery.

== See also ==
• List of American Civil War Medal of Honor recipients: G–L
