= Paddy Scanlan =

Paddy Scanlan may refer to:

- Paddy Scanlan (footballer) (1896–1977), Australian rules footballer
- Paddy Scanlan (hurler) (1905–1977), Irish hurler

== See also ==
- Pat Scanlan (1878–1938), Australian rules footballer
- Patrick Scanlan (c. 1838–1903), Union Army soldier and Medal of Honor recipient
- Pat Scanlon (disambiguation)
