= George Gewinner =

German-born American composer and bandmaster (1914–1894)

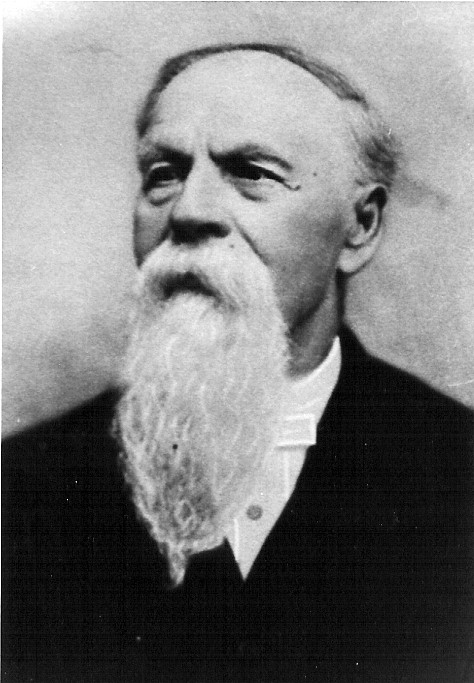
- Gewinner c. 1890
- Born: May 27, 1814; Bayreuth, Germany
- Died: January 18, 1894 (aged 79); Omaha, Nebraska
- Occupations: Musician; Bandmaster
- Spouse: Victoria Schneider

George Gewinner (May 27, 1814 – January 18, 1894) was a German-born American composer and military bandmaster during the American Civil War. Gewinner was born, raised and educated in Bayreuth, Bavaria, emigrating to the United States in 1848 where he volunteered in the Union Army three different times during the Civil War, serving as chief musician and band leader for the 99th New York Infantry Regiment, the 4th Massachusetts Cavalry and the 6th Infantry Regiment. It was Gewinner's 4th Massachusetts Cavalry band that played the surrender of Robert E. Lee to Ulysses S. Grant at Appomattox Courthouse on April 9, 1865, ending the Civil War.

== Life ==
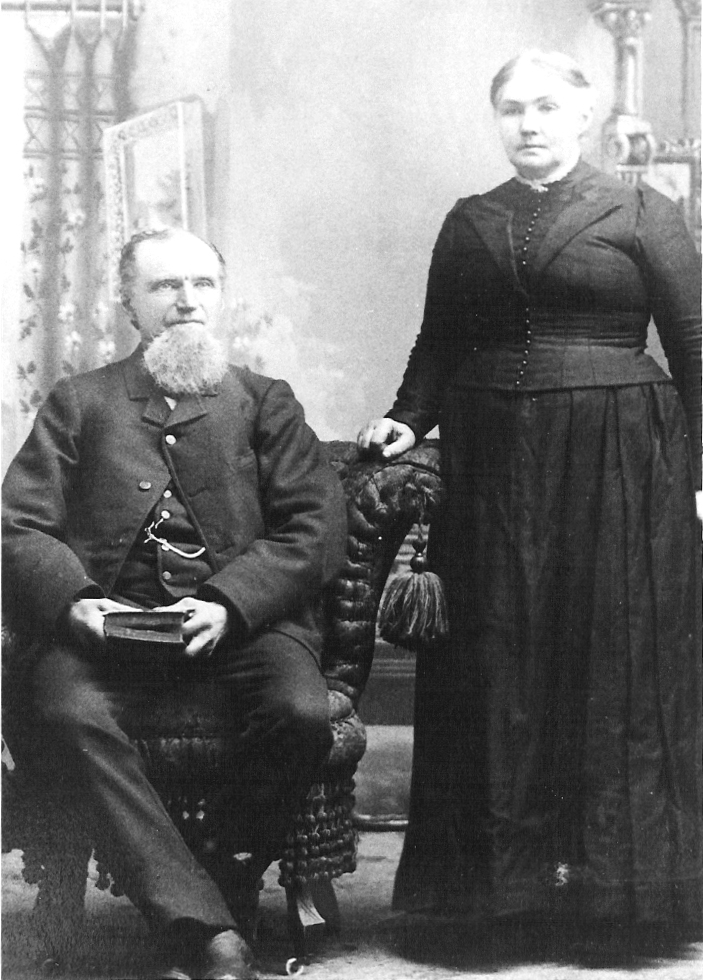
Gewinner and Victoria Schneider c. 1885

Gewinner was born on May 27, 1814, in Bayreuth, Bavaria to Johann Heinrich Gewinner and Anna Margaretha (née Schrödel). After completing his basic education in Bayreuth, Gewinner set out in 1832 for Munich and completed an eight-year degree program in music. In 1847, Gewinner married Victoria Schneider in Landau-in-der-Pfalz, Germany, after which, in 1848, they emigrated to the United States.

Gewinner began his new life in America working multiple jobs, in this case as a clock maker and as a performing musician. From 1848 to 1858, the Gewinner family lived in New York City, Providence Rhode Island and Boston Massachusetts, where in Boston in the late 1850s, Gewinner was conductor of the 'New Bedford Brass Band'. Gewinner met Patrick Gilmore in Boston and joined his new Gilmore Band. Gewinner and Gilmore lived just 6 miles apart, Gewinner in Malden Mass and Patrick in Boston. They had both immigrated to the US in 1848, both were active musicians in the Boston area in the late 1850s, and they reportedly became fast friends, a friendship that endured many decades.

== Military ==
With the onset of the American Civil War in April 1861, Gewinner was drawn to service. His close friend Patrick Gilmore was tasked by John Albion Andrew of Massachusetts to reorganize "military music-making" and named 'Bandmaster-general' by General Nathaniel P. Banks. On 3 October 1861, Patrick Gilmore enlisted full-time as Band Leader of the 24th Infantry regiment, and likely due to the strong friendship between the two men, Gewinner enlisted exactly one week later on 10 Oct 1861 as 'Bandmaster and Chief Musician' with the 99th Infantry regiment.

The 99th, known as the "Union Coast Guard", or "Bartlett's Naval Brigade", was initially organized by Colonel William A. Bartlett in New York City, though it included many men from Massachusetts. Gewinner served one year and mustered out of the 99th Infantry in August 1862, volunteering again with the 4th Massachusetts Cavalry, where he served as band leader through 1865. Campaigns engaged by this unit during Gewinner's time include; Appomattox Campaign, 3rd Battle of Petersburg, Battle of High Bridge, and the Battle of Appomattox Courthouse. It was reported that Gewinner's band played at the surrender of Robert E. Lee to Ulysses S. Grant at the McLean House near Appomattox Courthouse on April 9, 1865. A few months after the surrender, Gewinner mustered out of service again in Boston, Massachusetts Sep 1865.

After the Civil War ended, Gewinner returned to 'private practice', but in March 1870 at the age of 55 he volunteered once more to serve the Army, this time enlisting in the 6th Infantry Regiment along with two of his sons, Oscar and Otto Gewinner. Gewinner was again named 'Bandmaster' and 'Chief Musician'. During the 1870s the 6th Infantry Regiment was deployed as a protective force to Ft. Buford where they saw action during the Indian Wars in the Dakota and Montana Territories.

== Trial ==
In August 1873, Gewinner was charged with "disobedience to orders in violation of the 9th article of war", and a courts martial was convened at Fort Buford in the Dakota Territory. According to the original courts martial transcript, Gewinner had been ordered by Lt. Col D. Huston Jr to turn his band music over to principal musician Henry Hellmich, but refused to do so on the grounds the music was his own personal property.

Below is the argument Gewinner made to assert his personal property rights, in his own words:

"31 July 1873. I have respectfully to state to the members of the Court that the music I was called upon by Colonel Huston my then commanding officer to give up was my own property composed long before I ever served in the 6th Infantry. It was my property as much so as the money in my purse. I was not called upon to loan it but to surrender it. This music is of my own selection, arrangement and composition, written upon my own paper and arranged in books all my own, and believing that from my then disability I would eventually be discharged, I considered it an aid or means to future support. Therefore, I especially felt opposed to letting it go from my custody so that it might be, as it certainly would have been, copied. The Court is therefore, called upon to decide whether I can be protected in my private and personal rights and property as against the assumed authority of my Commanding Officer to deprive me of both; an authority which I then believed and still hold to be unlawful and oppressive. Gewinner, Chief Musician, Band of the 6th Infantry"

When the courts martial proceedings were over, Gewinner was found 'not guilty' by commanding Brigadier General Alfred Terry for the reason that he could not be ordered to surrender his personal property to the US Government. Gewinner went on to serve 2 more years, mustering out of military service for the last time in June 1875 for disability.

== Later years and death ==
After his military service, Gewinner focused on teaching a new generation of music students in Omaha, Nebraska, until his death on January 18, 1894. He was buried 23 January 1894 in Mount Hope Cemetery, Omaha, Nebraska.
