= George W. Brush =

American politician

George Washington Brush
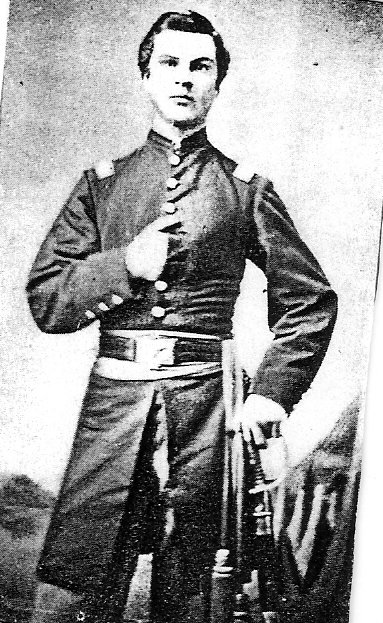
- Brush in 1863

Member of the New York State Assembly
- In office 1895

Member of the New York State Senate
- In office 1896–1898

Chairman of the New York State Senate Committee on Public Health
- In office 1896–1898

Personal details
- Born: October 4, 1842 West Hills, Huntington, New York, U.S.
- Died: November 18, 1927 (aged 85)
- Resting place: Huntington Rural Cemetery Long Island, New York
- Awards: Medal of Honor

Military service
- Allegiance: United States (Union)
- Branch/service: United States Army (Union Army)
- Years of service: 1861–1865
- Rank: Captain
- Unit: 34th Regiment United States Colored Troops
- Battles/wars: American Civil War

George Washington Brush (October 4, 1842 – November 18, 1927) was an American soldier, dentist, physician and politician. He served as a captain of a black company in the 34th Infantry Regiment U.S. Colored Troops in the Union Army during the American Civil War and received the Medal of Honor. After the war he became first a dentist and then a physician. He was elected to the New York State Assembly and then the State Senate. As chairman of the Senate Health Committee he helped establish the State Tuberculosis Sanatorium at Saranac Lake.

== Early life and education ==
Brush was born in West Hills, Huntington, New York in 1842. He was born in the family farmhouse that is still standing and occupied today. He left to live in Brooklyn at the age of 17. He worked in a dry goods store for $2.00 per week. Two years later when the Civil War began he was among the first to volunteer.

== Career ==
=== Civil War ===
On August 13, 1861, George joined the 48th New York Regiment as a private and fought at the capture of Fort Walker and Fort Beauregard. On June 6, 1863, he was promoted to 2nd Lieutenant and volunteered to serve with the newly formed 34th USCT Infantry Regiment made up of black slaves from South Carolina. He was among the first group of white officers to command a unit of all black troops. By 1865 he was a captain commanding a full company of the 34th Regiment.

After the war, Brush became a Companion of the Massachusetts Commandery of the Military Order of the Loyal Legion of the United States. He was also a Compatriot of the Empire State Society of the Sons of the American Revolution.

==== Medal of Honor ====
The 34th Infantry Regiment was ordered on May 24, 1864, on an expedition to Asheepo River, South Carolina to burn a railroad trestle across a marsh at that point. About 400 members of the black regiment were loaded onto the troop steamer Boston, including 1st Lieutenant George W. Brush and the men of his company. The men had been ferried out to the Boston by small boats and one was fastened to the ships stern. Sailing down the Asheepo River in fog and darkness the ship became stranded upon an oyster bed. The Confederates planted a battery of guns on the river bank and began shelling the Boston. Lieutenant Brush quickly assembled four volunteers - David Lewis Gifford, William Downey, Patrick Scanlan, and John Duffey - and began transporting men from the Boston to shore with the one small boat available. His Medal of Honor citation reads as follows "voluntarily commanded a boat crew, which went to the rescue of a large number of Union soldiers on board the stranded steamer Boston, and with great gallantry succeeded in conveying them to shore, being exposed during the entire time to heavy fire from a Confederate battery". Instrumental in attaining the Medal of Honor for Lieutenant Brush were the efforts of the unit's Chaplain Homer W. Moore.

=== Dentist and physician ===
After the war Brush returned to Brooklyn and became a dentist. After several years as a dentist he entered Long Island College Hospital Medical School from which he graduated in 1876. He had a long and successful medical practice in Brooklyn.

=== State legislator ===
Dr. Brush was very active in Brooklyn civic and political affairs. He was a member of the New York State Assembly (Kings Co., 7th D.) in 1895; and a member of the New York State Senate (4th D.) from 1896 to 1898, sitting in the 119th, 120th and 121st New York State Legislatures. He was chairman of the Senate Health Committee and helped to establish the N.Y. State Tuberculosis Sanitarium at Saranac Lake.

He was also a member of the Sons of the American Revolution and the Military Order of the Loyal Legion of the United States.

== Personal life ==
Brush had married Alice Bowers in Huntington in 1865 while home on leave. Alice sailed from New York to Florida to join Brush seven weeks after the wedding. The steamship was caught in a storm off Cape Hatteras and sank with all on board being lost. In 1868 Brush married Marie Bowers, Alice's younger sister. They were married for fifty-eight years and had one child, a son named Herbert.

== Death ==
Dr. Brush died on November 16, 1927, and is buried in the Huntington Rural Cemetery in Suffolk County in Long Island, New York.

== See also ==
- List of Medal of Honor recipients

== Notes ==
New York State Assembly
Preceded by Stillman F. Kneeland	New York State Assembly; Kings County, 7th District; 1895	Succeeded by Frederick A. Newman
New York State Senate
Preceded by George A. Owens	New York State Senate; 4th District; 1896–1898	Succeeded by David Floyd Davis
