= 49th parallel =

49th parallel may refer to:

- 49th parallel north, a circle of latitude in the Northern Hemisphere
- 49th parallel south, a circle of latitude in the Southern Hemisphere
- 49th Parallel (film), a 1941 Canadian and British film

== See also ==
- Canada–United States border
