= 46th parallel =

46th parallel may refer to:

- 46th parallel north, a circle of latitude in the Northern Hemisphere
- 46th parallel south, a circle of latitude in the Southern Hemisphere
