= 48th parallel =

48th parallel may refer to:

- 48th parallel north, a circle of latitude in the Northern Hemisphere
- 48th parallel south, a circle of latitude in the Southern Hemisphere
