= William Apthorp =

William Apthorp may refer to:

- William Lee Apthorp (1837–1879), American military leader and surveyor
- William Foster Apthorp (1848–1913), American writer, drama and music critic, editor and musician
