= 47th parallel =

47th parallel may refer to:

- 47th parallel north, a circle of latitude in the Northern Hemisphere
- 47th parallel south, a circle of latitude in the Southern Hemisphere
