= Pat Scanlon =

Pat Scanlon may refer to:

- Pat Scanlon (outfielder) (1861–1913), American baseball outfielder
- Pat Scanlon (third baseman) (born 1952), American baseball third baseman

== See also ==
- Pat Scanlan, Australian rules footballer
- Patrick Scanlan, soldier in the United States Union Army
