= William Downey =

William Downey may refer to:

- William Downey (1829–1915), Victorian studio photographer, see W. & D. Downey
- William Downey (Medal of Honor) (1832–1909), Irish soldier who fought in the American Civil War
