= Mont Richard-Foy =

Mountain in France

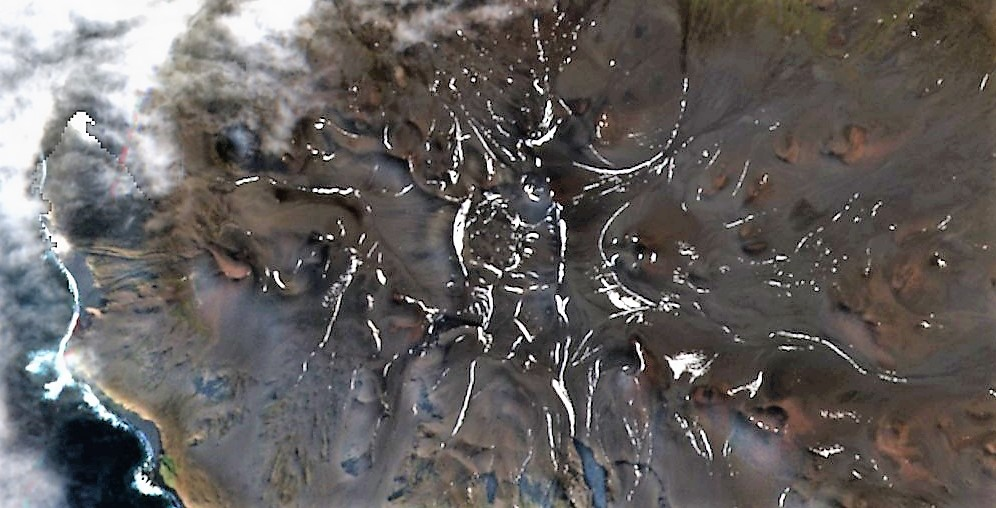
- Mont Richard-Foy Sentinel-2 image.

Highest point
- Elevation: 853 m (2,799 ft)
- Prominence: 853 m (2,799 ft)
- Isolation: 118.9 km (73.9 mi)
- Coordinates: 46°05′53″S 50°12′35″E

Geography
- Location within Indian Ocean
- Location: Île aux Cochons, Crozet Islands, French Southern and Antarctic Lands

Geology
- Mountain type: Stratovolcano

Climbing
- First ascent: unknown

Mont Richard-Foy is the highest mountain in the Île aux Cochons, Crozet Islands, French Southern and Antarctic Lands, Indian Ocean.

== Geography ==
This 934 m (3,064 ft) high peak rises in the middle of the western sector of Île aux Cochons, the largest island of the western group of the Crozet archipelago. Some sources give an elevation of 770 m (2,530 ft). The summit is seasonally covered with snow.

The mountain was named after French Navy officer Frédéric Richard-Foy (1849—1918). He was the commander of La Meurthe, the ship sent in 1887 to search for the survivors of the Tamaris.

== See also ==
- List of islands by highest point
- Mont Marion-Dufresne, the highest mountain in the Crozet group.
