= Îlots des Apôtres =

Islets in the Crozet Islands

Nickname: Apostle Islets
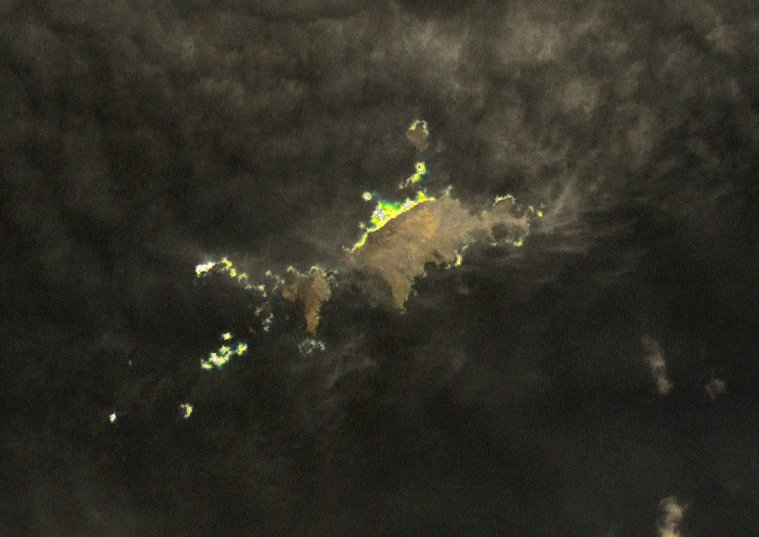
- Satellite Image of Îlots des Apôtres (NASA - Landsat)
- Interactive map of Îlots des Apôtres

Geography
- Coordinates: 45°57′18″S 50°25′30″E
- Area: 2.011 km^{2} (0.776 sq mi)
- Highest elevation: 289 m (948 ft)
- Highest point: Mont Pierre

Administration
- France

Demographics
- Population: Uninhabited

The Îlots des Apôtres (French pronunciation: [ilo dez‿apotʁ]) or Îles des Apôtres (English: Apostle Islets or Islands) are a group of small and uninhabited rocky islands in the north-western part of the Crozet Archipelago in the southern Indian Ocean, 10 km (6.2 mi) north of Île aux Cochons. Their total area is about 2 km^{2} (0.77 sq mi).

== Description ==
There are two larger islands (Île Grande - Big Island, and Île Petite - Little Island), together occupying almost 90 percent of the area. The highest peak is Mont Pierre (289 m or 948 ft on Île Grande. In addition, there are about 20 rocks, with elevations between 15 and 122 m (49 and 400 ft). The islands are very steep. Despite their small size, Île Grande reaches a height of 289 m (948 ft), and Île Petite 246 m (807 ft).

== History ==
On the night of 1 July 1875, the Strathmore, a three-masted ship sailing between the United Kingdom and New Zealand, was wrecked in the vicinity after striking a reef. Of the 89 passengers on board, 44 survived on Île Grande until 21 January 1876, when they were rescued by another ship.

== Important Bird Area ==
The islets have been identified as an Important Bird Area (IBA) by BirdLife International as a breeding site for seabirds, with at least 25 species nesting there. The birds include wandering, grey-headed, light-mantled, sooty, black-browed and Indian yellow-nosed albatrosses, great-winged, soft-plumaged, white-chinned and blue petrels, medium-billed prions, northern giant petrels, common diving petrels, Crozet blue-eyed shags and Kerguelen terns.

== The islets ==
Island or rock	English name	Area (ha)
Îlots des Apôtres	Apostle Islets	201.1
Rocher Nord	Northern Rock	6.0
L’Enclume	The Anvil	1.5
Grande Île	Big Island	150.0
Le Clown	The Clown	0.4
La Sentinelle perdue	The Lost Sentinel	0.2
Les Jumeaux	The Twins	0.5
Rocher Fendu	Split Rock	3.0
Petite Île	Little Island	30.0
Les Sentinelles du Diable	The Devil's Sentinels	1.0
La Grande Aiguille	Big Needle	1.0
La Petite Aiguille	Little Needle	0.2
Le Hangar	The Hangar	1.5
Le Donjon	The Keep	2.5
Rocher Sud	Southern Rock	1.5
Le Torpilleur	The Destroyer	0.1
Le Caillou	The Stone	0.4
L'Obélisque	The Obelisk	0.3
Rocher Percé	Bored Rock	1.0

== See also ==
- Administrative divisions of France
- French overseas departments and territories
- Islands controlled by France in the Indian and Pacific oceans
- List of Antarctic and sub-Antarctic islands
