= Île aux Cochons =

Third largest of the Crozet Islands

Nickname: Pig Island
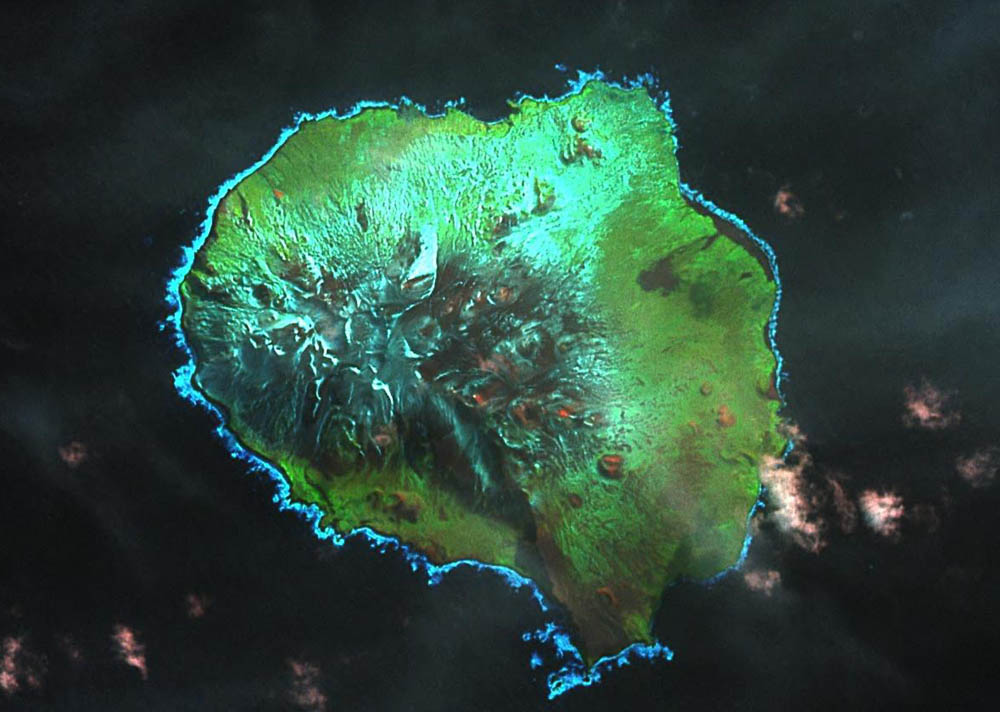
- Satellite image of the island
- Interactive map of Île aux Cochons

Geography
- Location: South Indian Ocean
- Coordinates: 46°06′09″S 50°13′54″E
- Archipelago: Crozet Islands
- Area: 67 km^{2} (26 sq mi)
- Length: 10 km (6 mi)
- Width: 9 km (5.6 mi)
- Highest elevation: 853 m (2799 ft)
- Highest point: Mont Richard-Foy

Administration
- France

Demographics
- Population: 0

Île aux Cochons (French pronunciation: [il o kɔʃɔ̃]), or Pig Island, is an uninhabited island in the subantarctic Crozet Archipelago. With an area of 67 km^{2} (26 sq mi) it is the third largest island of the group. Administratively, it is part of the French Southern and Antarctic Lands.

== Description ==
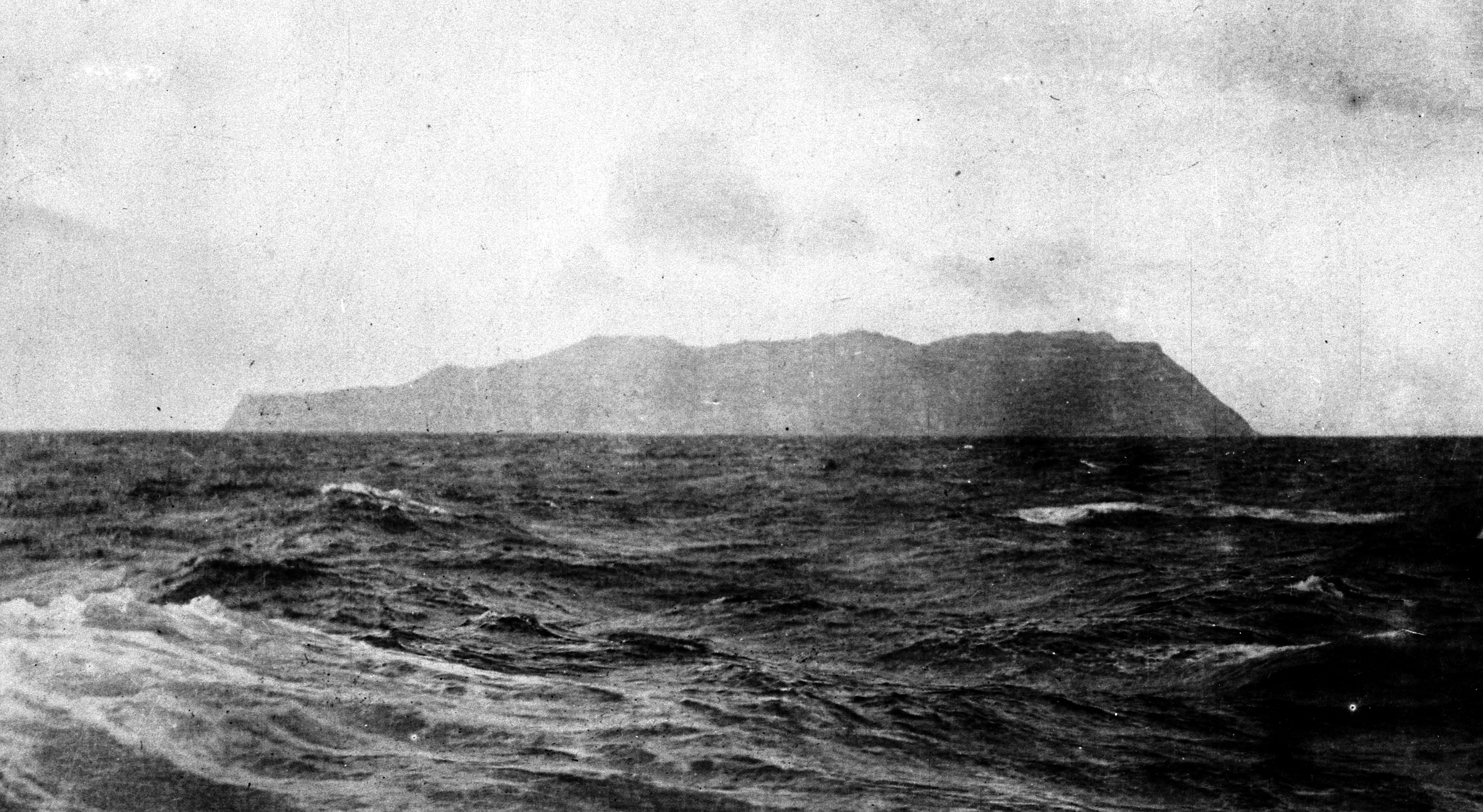
Île aux Cochons photographed from on Loch Etive in between 1885 and 1911.

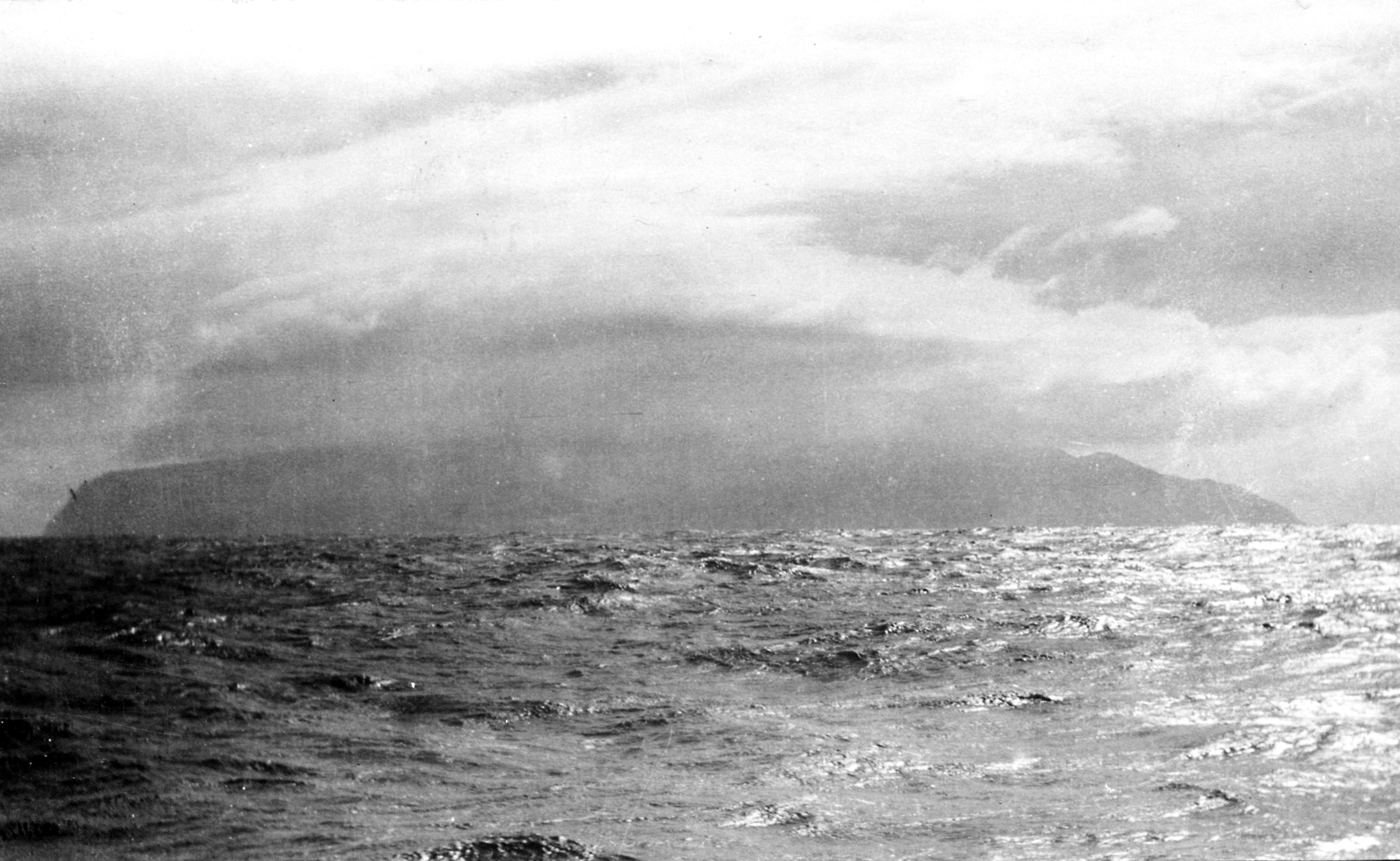
Île aux Cochons photographed from on Loch Etive in between 1885 and 1911.

Île aux Cochons is the westernmost island of the archipelago, lying some 30 km north-west of Île des Pingouins and 15 km south-west of the Îlots des Apôtres. It is an eroded volcanic dome, scattered with inactive craters, and a coastline consisting partly of low cliffs. Introduced species include cats, rabbits and mice. The introduced pigs that gave the island its name have been eradicated. There is no human infrastructure and visits by researchers are rare.

== Important Bird Area ==
The island has been identified as an Important Bird Area (IBA) by BirdLife International as a breeding site for seabirds, and notably for its large penguin populations. It held the world's largest king penguin colony, with about half a million breeding pairs in the 1980s, but by 2018 this had fallen to 60,000 pairs, for as yet unexplained reasons.

There are also substantial numbers of gentoo, macaroni and northern rockhopper penguins. It also has the largest colony of wandering albatrosses in the Indian Ocean, with some 1200 pairs, as well as four million pairs of medium-billed prions and a million pairs of South Georgia diving petrels. Eaton's pintails are present. There are large populations of southern elephant seals, Antarctic fur seals and subantarctic fur seals.

== Penguin population decline ==
In a 2018 report in Antarctic Science, researchers estimated that the population of King penguins on the island had dwindled from 500,000 breeding pairs to just 60,000. With the last count of penguin population in 1982, the most recent demonstrates an 88% decrease in colony population. Researchers are still uncertain of the cause but have suggested climate change, disease, or resource scarcity. A research expedition to the island was planned for late fall of 2019.

== See also ==
- List of Antarctic islands north of 60° S
