= Western Metropolis (1863 ship) =

Steamship

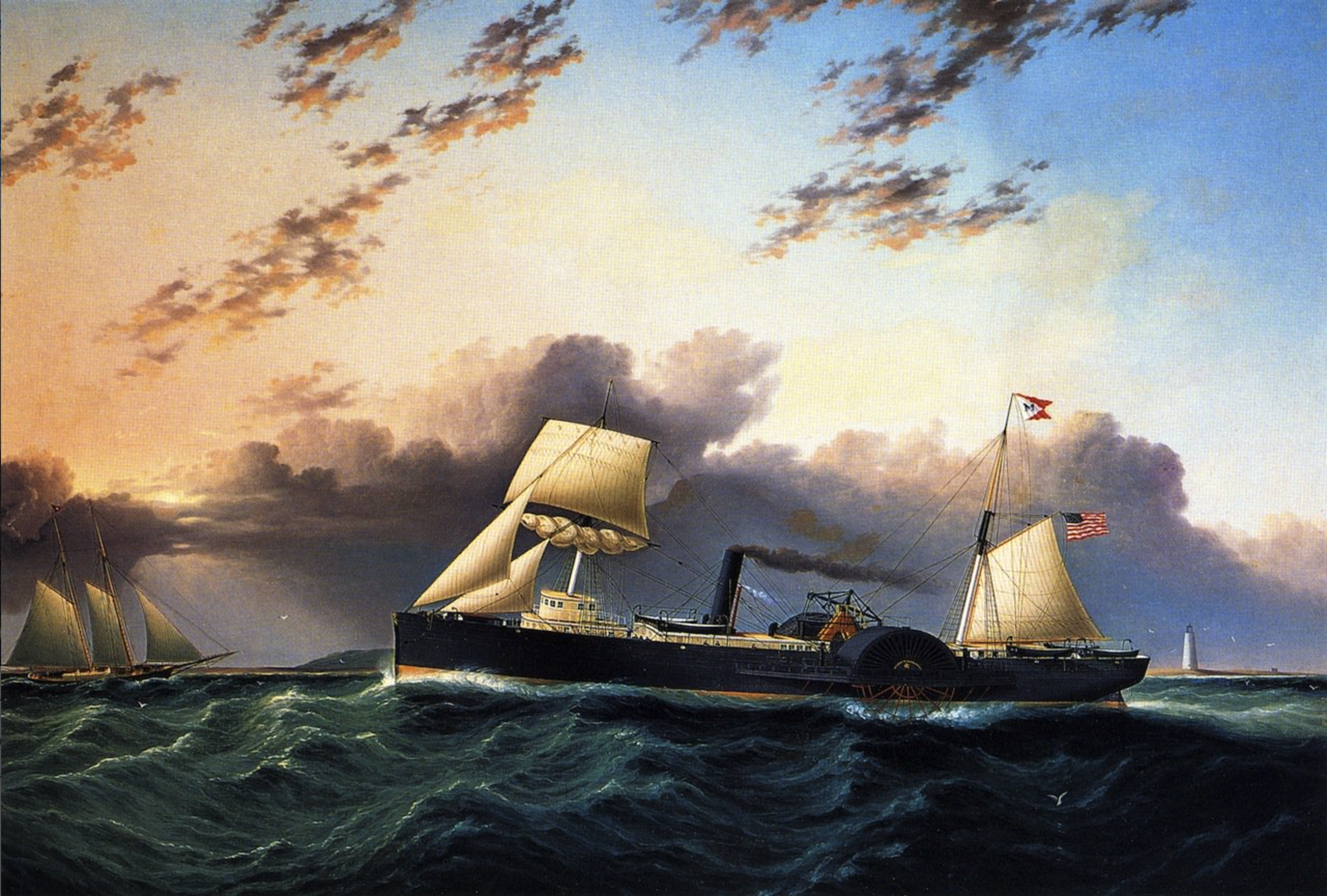
- Western Metropolis. Notice she is flying the Merchants' Line flag indicating that this was her appearance sometime between 1869 and 1875.

United States
- Name: Western Metropolis
- Builder: Atlantic Marine Railway Company
- Launched: July 25, 1863
- Identification: Official Number 26531; Signal letters H.S.Q.J.

General characteristics during the Civil War
- Displacement: 2,250 tons
- Length: 290 ft (88 m)
- Beam: 40 ft (12 m)
- Draft: 18 ft 4 in (5.59 m)
- Depth of hold: 23 ft (7.0 m)
- Propulsion: sail and steam engine; side wheel-propelled

Western Metropolis was a wooden side-wheel steamship built in 1863. She was chartered by the quartermaster corps of the Union Army during the American Civil War to provide logistical support. As a transport ship, she was unarmed, but nonetheless captured a Confederate blockade runner. After the war, she was in commercial service for another ten years. Notably, she made five trans-Atlantic voyages and brought several thousand immigrants to the United States from Northern Europe. She was idled in 1875, and had her engine removed in 1878. Her ultimate fate is unknown.

== Construction and characteristics ==
Western Metropolis was commissioned by the Benner and Brown Company, whose principal owners were N. George Griswold, Hiram Benner, and William H. Wall. She was to supply the Union Army's need for additional seaborne shipping to support military forces along the Confederate coast. She was built at the Atlantic Marine Railway Company shipyard in Red Hook, Brooklyn, New York under the supervision of Captain F. Z. Tucker. She was launched on July 25, 1863.

Her frame was and hull planking were constructed entirely of oak. She was 290 feet (88 m) long, with a beam of 40 feet (12 m), and a depth of hold of 23 feet (7.0 m). Her loaded draft was 18.25 feet (5.56 m). She displaced 2,250 tons.

The ship was propelled by side-mounted paddlewheels. They were powered by a walking beam steam engine. Its one cylinder had a diameter of 76 inches (1.9 m) and a stroke of 12 feet (3.7 m). This engine had been used by two previous ships. It had been built in 1848 by Merrick and Towne of Philadelphia for Empire State. It was moved to a previous Western Metropolis in 1856. Both of these ships were steamers on the Great Lakes.

The ship's namesake was the earlier 1856 Western Metropolis, the lake steamer from which the ship's engine was obtained.

== Civil War service (1863–1865) ==
Western Metropolis was chartered by the Quartermaster Corps of the Union Army for $850 a day on December 23, 1863. This contract expired on January 24, 1865. She was put to work immediately. On December 27, 1863, Western Metropolis sailed from New York to Newport, Rhode Island. She arrived the next day to embark the 1st battalion of the 3d Rhode Island Cavalry Regiment which had been ordered to New Orleans. The ship was simply not ready. She took aboard 350 horses but there were no accommodations for the troops or for cooking their meals. It took several days to ready the ship for her first passengers. She reached Fortress Monroe on January 2, 1864 and put in for additional repairs. Three days later she sailed for New Orleans again. She arrived in New Orleans on January 13, 1864 and disembarked her cavalry troops.

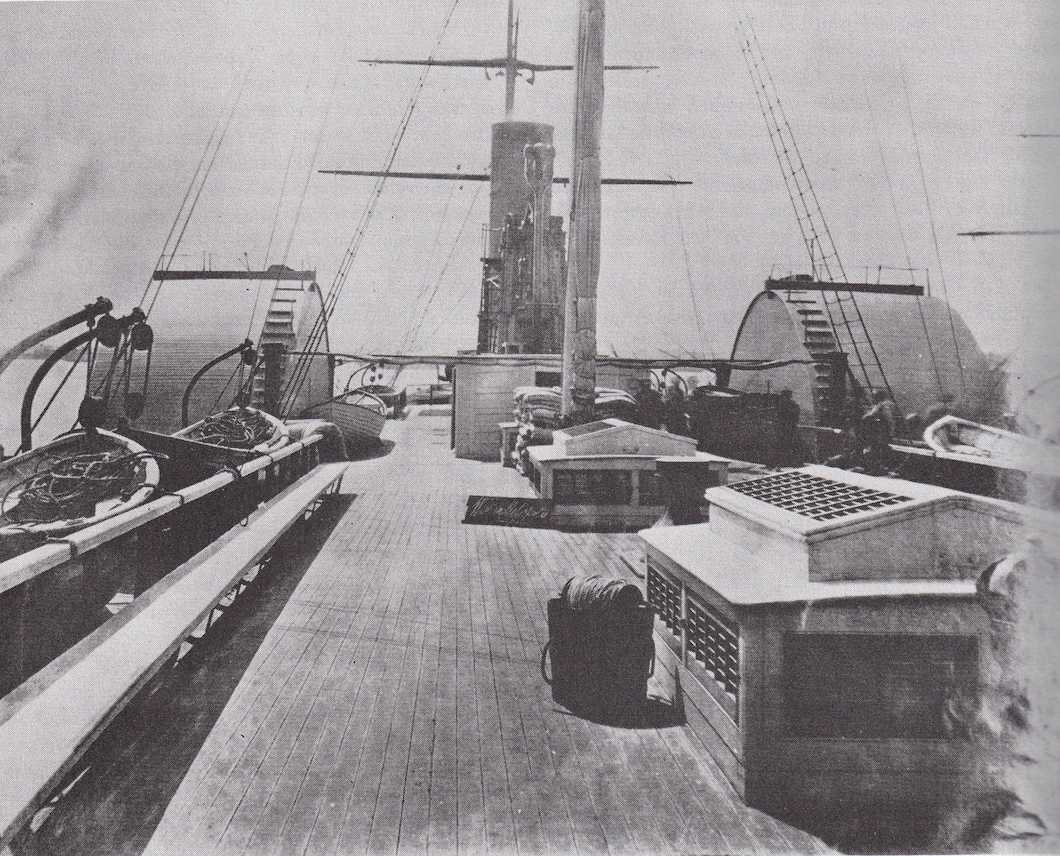
Deck view of Western Metropolis from the stern looking forward. This photograph, taken in June 1864, was during the period she was employed as a hospital ship by the Union Army.

As an Army transport, Western Metropolis was not an armed vessel. She had no guns mounted. Nonetheless, while returning from New Orleans to New York, she managed to capture a British-flagged blockade runner, Rosita. On January 28, 1864 she observed the ship near Key West and chased her down in three hours. Despite having only three muskets and no ammunition, Captain William B. Hilton organized a boarding party of passengers and crew that seized the ship. Upon taking control, her captors found that Rosita was in the process of being scuttled. Her seacocks were open and the ship was flooding. Further, a safety valve on the steam engine was closed, creating the likelihood of a boiler explosion. Quick work resolved both threats and Rosita was towed to Key West as a prize of war. After her adventurous trip, the ship arrived in New York on February 3, 1864.

Western Metropolis made two trips between Boston and Hilton Head, South Carolina to move units of the 4th Massachusetts Cavalry Regiment. The 2nd battalion left Boston on March 20, 1864 and arrived on April 1. The 3rd battalion and 150 men from the 1st battalion sailed on April 23, 1864 and arrived on April 27. During the first trip, at 4 am on March 24, 1864, Western Metropolis collided with the fishing schooner Triumph near Nantucket, Massachusetts. The schooner sank immediately taking two of her crew with her. Her remaining three crewman were rescued. In subsequent litigation Western Metropolis was held at fault for the collision for lack of an adequate lookout.

In mid-1864 Western Metropolis was fitted out and staffed as a hospital transport. She was equipped with lifts to lower non-ambulatory patients to the wards. Five doctors and at least 60 nurses were put aboard. Her first trip as a hospital ship sailed to Newport, Rhode Island where she arrived on June 6, 1864 with 588 wounded soldiers from the Army of the Potomac. She transported another 600 wounded from Alexandria, Virginia to New York, arriving June 14, 1864. Two trips in July 1864 brought another 1,010 sick and wounded to New York. Two more trips transporting wounded soldiers to northern hospitals followed in August 1864. Accounts of one of these trips shows that she served both white and black soldiers. On August 17, 1864 Western Metropolis arrived in New York with 218 white and 239 "colored" soldiers to be distributed to local hospitals. Her hospital trips to New York continued through November 1864, averaging two trips and 1,000 soldiers per month.

Western Metropolis participated in the first assault on Fort Fisher, joining the Federal fleet no later than December 17, 1864. Her role was to transport a portion of General Butler's troops to the battle. After the battle, a portion of the 112th New York Infantry Regiment was embarked on the steamer Charles Thomas. After leaving the Cape Fear River, the fleet anchored off Beaufort, South Carolina. A storm came up and Charles Thomas' anchors drug. The ship blew down on the steamer Baltic, also at anchor. The collision did no damage to Charles Thomas' hull, but her rudder was jammed and Baltic's anchor chain was wrapped around her propeller rendering the ship immobile. Western Metropolis took Charles Thomas in tow on January 1, 1865 and brought her to Fortress Monroe where they arrived on January 3, 1865.

The use of Western Metropolis by General Butler to support operations against Fort Fisher came to the attention of General Ulysses S. Grant. In a grumpy January 1, 1865 telegram, Grant asked that the ship be returned to her hospital duties and sent to Savannah, Georgia to evacuate the sick and wounded from General Sherman's army. Unsurprisingly, she was again transporting invalids north to New York later in the month.

== Benner & Brown Company (1865) ==
In February 1865, Western Metropolis was chartered to Marshall O. Roberts for his Nicaragua Transit Company. She was a temporary replacement for his ship Golden Rule. She was to sail from New York to San Juan de Nicaragua. From here, passengers would be transported up the San Juan River, across Lake Nicaragua, and a 15-mile carriage road to reach the Pacific Coast. Roberts had connecting steamers which would take passengers on to San Francisco. Western Metropolis cleared from New York on February 20, 1865 and arrived in Nicaragua on March 3. She took on 704 passengers returning from California and sailed for New York on March 6, 1865. She was short of water for her boilers and so stopped in Havana. While she was there, a Confederate blockade runner came into port with 700 bales of cotton from Galveston. With the Civil War still raging, confederate sympathizers threatened to burn Western Metropolis. Captain Hilton, with the aid of the American Counsel in Havana, managed to prevent such an event, and she sailed on to New York, reaching port on March 18, 1865.

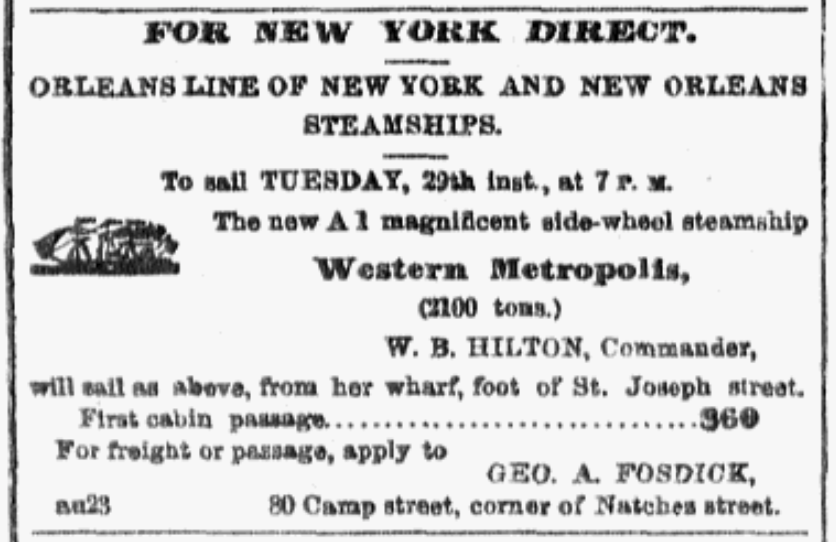
1865 advertisement for New Orleans to New York passage aboard Western Metropolis.

The ship's next charter was to H. B. Cromwell and Company which sent her to New Orleans. She left New York on April 15, 1865 and arrived in Louisiana on April 24. She arrived back in New York on May 7, 1865 with a rich agricultural cargo. She carried 315 bales of cotton, 2022 sacks of corn, 78 bales of hemp, 355 bales of tow, 2003 barrels of flour, 41 hogsheads of tobacco, and 50 kegs of butter. She returned to New Orleans with various manufactured goods, including supplies for building and repairing ships, including 174 spools of manila rope, 200 bales of oakum to caulk hull planking, 50 kegs of nails, and 1000 pounds of white lead for paint.

On May 22, 1865, Western Metropolis was chartered by the government once again, this time for $650 a day. Major General Weitzel was dispatched on the "Texas expedition" to eject the French who had occupied portions of Mexico. Western Metropolis was used as a troop transport. She flew the headquarters flag of the 1st division of the 25th Corps, having on board General Giles A Smith, his staff and two regiments of infantry. There were 1,500 troops aboard for the trip from Fortress Monroe to Brazos Santiago. She arrived back in New York on July 15, 1865 where her Army charter expired on July 21.

Her next charter was to W. H. Robson and Company which sent her back to New Orleans on August 10, 1865 with 2,500 tons of cargo. She returned to New York on September 7, 1865 with her capacious hold full of a record cargo of 3,413 bales of cotton.

Western Metropolis' final trip while owned by Benner and Brown was her only trip sailed for her owners, rather than under charter. She cleared New York on September 30, 1865 bound for Apalachicola, Florida. She arrived back in New York with another 3,000 bales cotton on November 15, 1865.

== North American Lloyd Steamship Company (1866–1867) ==
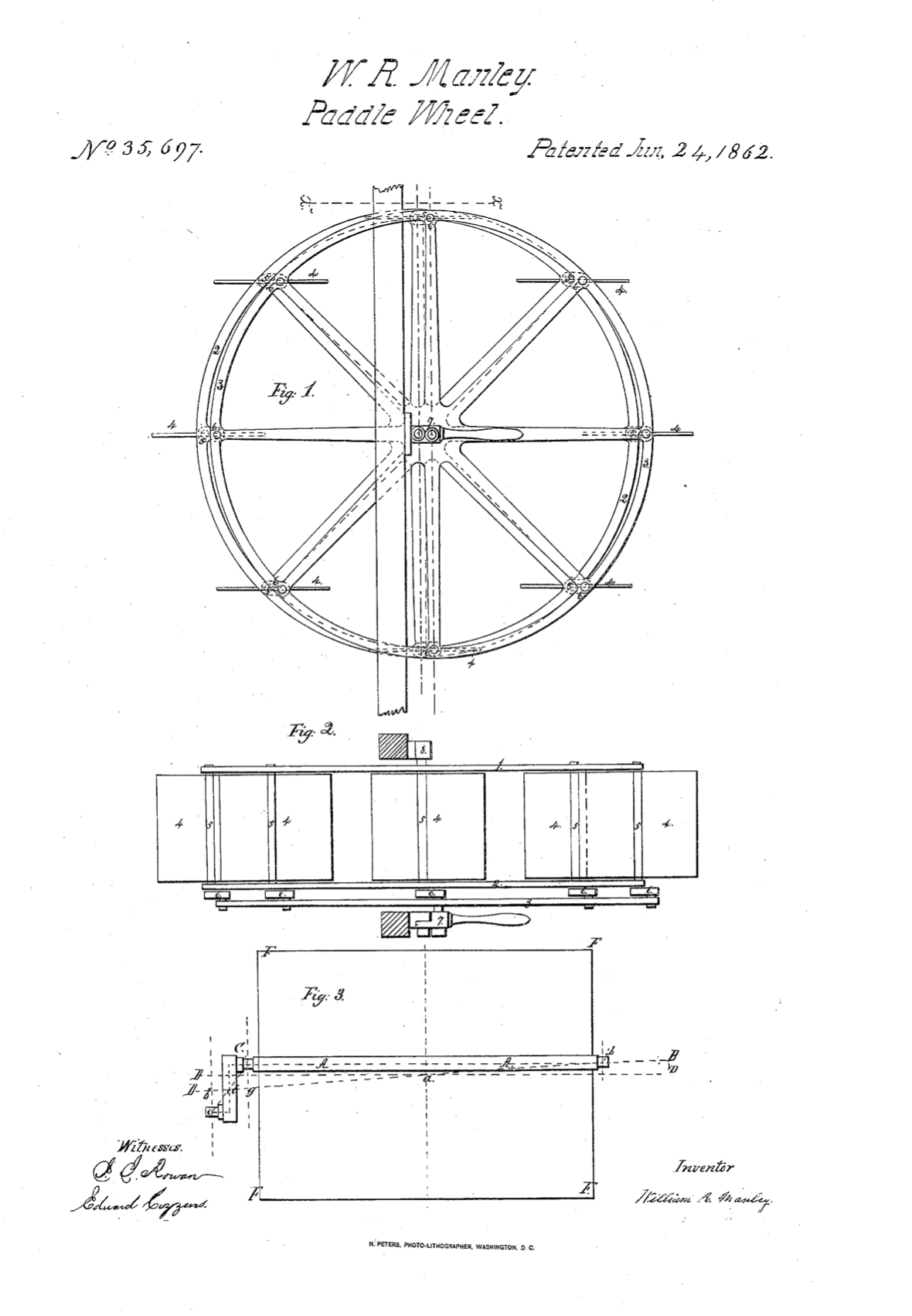
The patent diagram of the type of feathering paddlewheel that was installed on Western Metropolis.

At the end of 1865 Benner and Brown sold Western Metropolis to the Ruger Brothers for their new North American Lloyd Line. Advertising began immediately for a March 17, 1866 departure to Bremen, Germany with a stop at Cowes, England. The Rugers sent their new acquisition to the shipyard for a refit. New boilers were installed as well as a new set of side wheels. These were 32 feet (9.8 m) in diameter. Each of the twelve paddles per wheel was 12 feet (3.7 m) long and 3 feet (0.91 m) wide. Unlike conventional paddles which were fixed along the radius of the wheel, these feathering paddles rotated as the wheel turned. While there were several designs for improved paddlewheels at the time, those used on Western Metropolis were invented and built by W. R. Manley in New York. In theory, they would improve fuel efficiency. On her trial trip with her new paddles she burned 2,240 pounds of coal per hour.

The new paddlewheels turned out to be a costly mistake. Not only was the ship not ready for her advertised March sailing, but she did not even have her trial run with her new equipment until June 1866. When she finally did leave New York bound for Bremen, so many of her paddles broke off the wheels that she was forced to return to Boston where she arrived July 6, 1866. Temporary repairs were made and Western Metropolis sailed back to New York on July 13, 1866 for more work on her paddlewheels.

In part due to the failure of Western Metropolis to generate any revenue, and the disruption caused by the Austro-Prussian War, the Ruger Brothers were unable to pay the mortgages on their ships. Western Metropolis was seized by the sheriff and set for auction on October 31, 1866. The auction never took place, as a related set of New York steamship entrepreneurs, backed by the Pacific Mail Steamship Company, funded a new corporation to pay off the mortgages and purchase the Rugers' ships. In a complex set of transactions which caused losses among the shareholders and creditors of the North American Lloyd Steamship Company, Western Metropolis was sold to the New York and Bremen Steamship Company.

== New York and Bremen Steamship Company (1867–1868) ==
After Western Metropolis' failed trans-Atlantic trip, the first order of business for her new owners was to fix her paddlewheels. According to press reports, the paddles were "doubly strengthened". She went to sea with a collection of prominent engineers on February 13, 1867 for a trial of her new equipment and her captain was told to not come back until they had experienced heavy weather in order to thoroughly test the repairs. The trial was successful, and the ship sailed from New York for Cowes and Bremen on March 7, 1867. She arrived back in New York on April 24, 1867 with 710 passengers, many of them immigrants.

Western Metropolis made two more uneventful roundtrips to Bremen, but on her fourth trip she limped into Southampton on September 8, 1867 with a broken shaft. Her machinery was repaired and the trip continued to Bremen. She arrived back in New York on November 7, 1867 with 921 passengers, many of them immigrants. This was her last trip for her line. Stiff competition in the trans-Atlantic trade from foreign-flagged vessels had the New York and Bremen Line idling ships as early March 1868. All of the line's ships, including Western Metropolis, were listed for auction on May 25, 1868. She was sold for $57,000. Her new owner never sailed the ship, but sold her on to the Merchants' Steamship Company in November 1869.

== Merchants' Steamship Company (1869–1875) ==
Merchants' Line ships, including Western Metropolis, sailed between New York and New Orleans. This became the ship's steady work, with a few exceptions, over the last five years of her working life. Her first sailing for her new owners cleared New York on March 12, 1870. She returned to New York from her final trip to New Orleans on March 9, 1875. Just days after her return, The Merchants' Line ceased operations. The ship never made another commercial voyage. Her wooden hull, side-wheel propulsion, and nearly 30 year-old engine were obsolete technologies that left her unable to compete with more modern ships.

Her five years with the Merchants' Line did offer a few exceptions to her New Orleans round-trips. In 1870, her former owners, the Ruger Brothers, chartered her for another trans-Atlantic trip. She cleared New York on May 18, 1870 for a sweep of Northern European ports including Le Havre, Bremen, Copenhagen, Swinemunde, Kiel, and Kristiansand. The Rugers' poor luck with Western Metropolis seemed to hold on this trip. In a dense fog on June 9, 1870 the ship ran aground near Kullen on the Swedish coast. Captain H. S. Quick was able to refloat the vessel, but lost an anchor and its chain in doing so. Notwithstanding this misadventure, the ship was able to complete her voyage, and she arrived back in New York on July 7, 1870 with a full load of 954 immigrants. After this, her last trans-Atlantic voyage, she resumed her sailings to New Orleans.

Another eventful trip began in New York on October 7, 1871. As she headed for New Orleans, the shaft driving her port paddlewheel cracked. She proceeded on just the starboard wheel, arriving in New Orleans on October 16, 1871. The return voyage did not go as well. The crack in the shaft grew to the point where Western Metropolis could no longer use her engine. She was towed into Key West by the steamer Sherman on October 29, 1871. A new shaft was produced in New York and sent with an installation crew to Key West. The repair was made in January 1872 and the ship returned to her New York to New Orleans sailings.

After her service with the Merchants' Line she sat idle at her dock in Brooklyn for her last few years. It appears that ownership of Western Metropolis changed several times during this period. She was owned by W. F. Weld and Company in 1878 when she was sold to Charles Delameter of the Delameter Iron Works for $15,000. Her engine was removed and she disappears from Federal registration. Her ultimate fate is unknown.
