= 34th United States Colored Infantry Regiment =

The 34th United States Colored Infantry was a U.S.C.T. infantry regiment in the Union Army during the American Civil War. It was re-organized from the 2nd South Carolina Infantry (African Descent) in February 1864. It was assigned to various posts in Florida and South Carolina, and took part in the Battle of Honey Hill in November 1864. It was mustered out on February 28, 1866.

One officer, George W. Brush, was awarded the Medal of Honor for leading a rescue operation on the Ashepoo River.

== Commanding Officers ==
- Col. William Warren Marple
- L. Col. William Lee Apthorp

== See also ==
- List of United States Colored Troops Civil War units

== Sources ==
- South Carolina Civil War soldiers
