= Battle of High Bridge =

Battle of the American Civil War

Coordinates: 37.3122°N 78.3177°W

- Part of the American Civil War
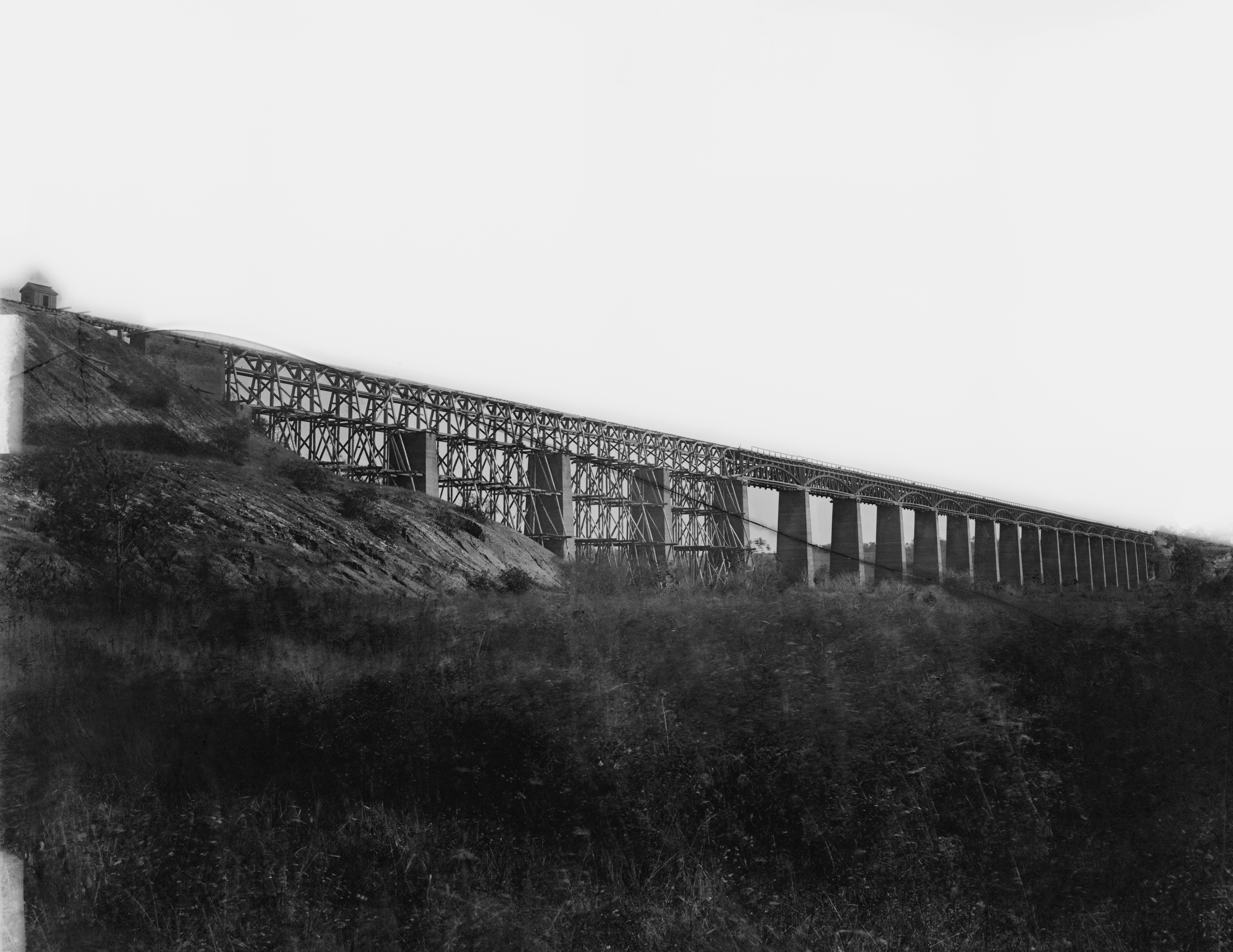
- High Bridge over the Appomattox River near Farmville, Virginia. Photographed in 1865 by Timothy H. O'Sullivan during repairs following its burning during the war. The trestles on the left were burned by retreating Confederate troops.
Date	April 6, 1865 – April 7, 1865
Location	Prince Edward & Cumberland County, Virginia
Result	Inconclusive

Belligerents
United States (Union)	(Confederate States of America) Confederate States (Confederacy)

Commanders and leaders
April 6: Theodore Read; April 7: Andrew A. Humphreys	April 6: Thomas L. Rosser; April 7: William Mahone

Strength
880	1,200

Casualties and losses
847 total ~800 captured	~100

The Battle of High Bridge refers to two engagements fought on April 6 and 7, 1865, near the end of the Appomattox Campaign of the American Civil War about 4 miles (6.4 km) northeast of Farmville, Virginia. The first battle is often the one identified as the Battle of High Bridge.

On April 6, 1865, Confederate cavalry under Major General Thomas L. Rosser fought stubbornly to secure the South Side Railroad's High Bridge and lower wagon bridge over the Appomattox River near Farmville, Virginia. A large Union Army raiding party intended to destroy the bridges to prevent the Confederate Army from crossing back to the north side of the river. Both sides had several officers killed and wounded. The Union force suffered 42 killed and wounded. The entire surviving Union force of about 800 men was captured. The Confederates suffered about 100 casualties. Union Colonel (Brevet Brigadier General) Theodore Read and Confederate Colonel Reuben B. Boston were killed. Union Colonel Francis Washburn and Confederate Colonel James Dearing (often identified as a brigadier general but his appointment was never confirmed) were mortally wounded in the engagement.

On April 7, 1865, Confederate Lieutenant General James Longstreet's rear guard attempted to burn the bridges that the Confederates had saved the day before in order to prevent Union forces from following them across. Troops of the Union II Corps fought the Confederates assigned to burn the bridges in an effort to drive off the Confederates and save the bridges. Part of the railroad bridge burned and was rendered unusable but Union forces were able to save the wagon bridge over which the II Corps crossed in pursuit of General Robert E. Lee's Army of Northern Virginia. Failure to destroy this bridge enabled Union forces to catch up with the Confederates north of the Appomattox River at Cumberland Church 3 miles (4.8 km) north of Farmville.

== Background ==
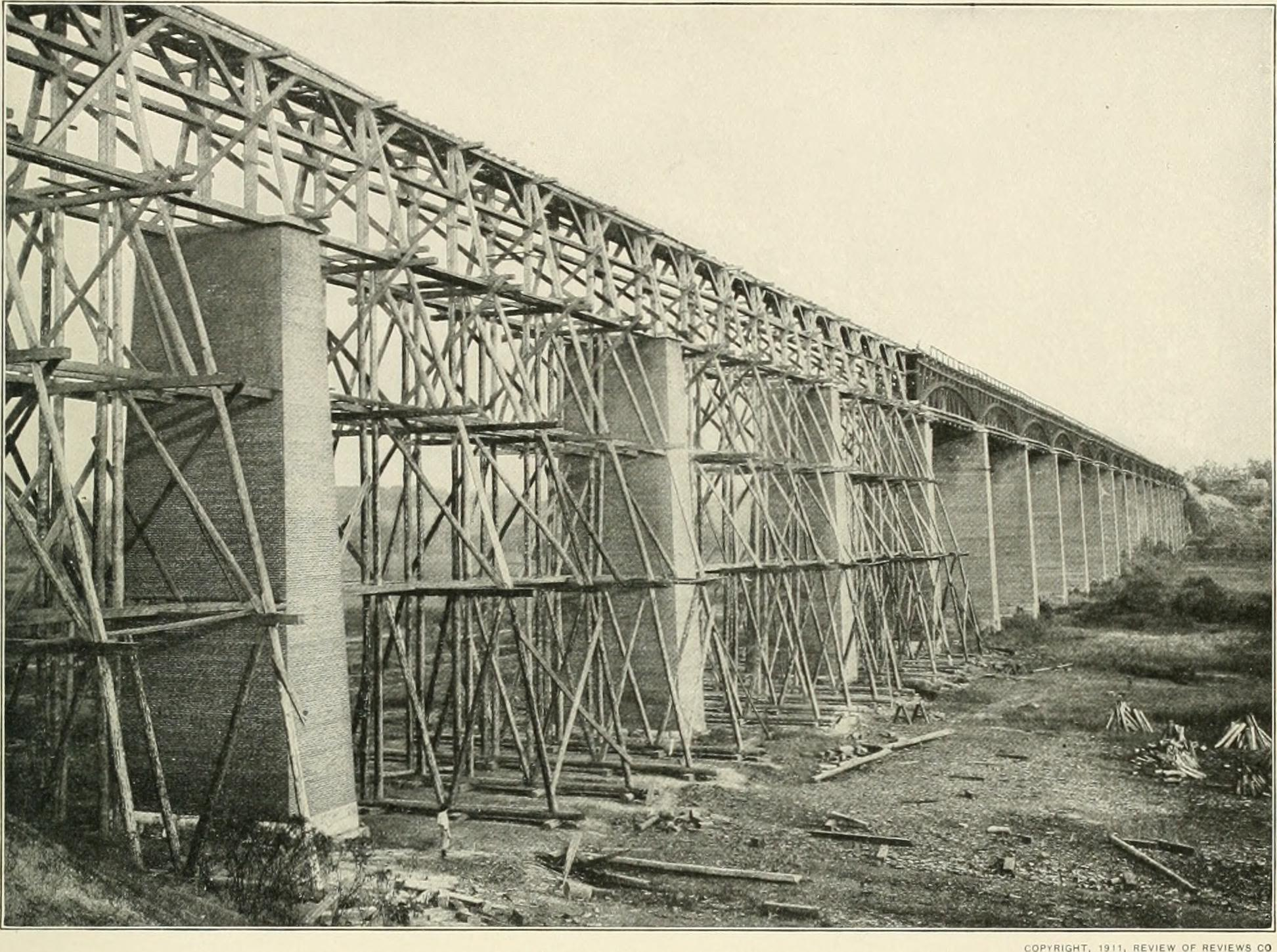
Another view of the High Bridge

High Bridge, 2,500 feet (760 m) long and 126 feet (38 m) high, was the crossing of the South Side Railroad over the Appomattox River and its flood plain, 4 miles (6.4 km) northeast of Farmville, Virginia. A wooden bridge for wagons was located below the railroad bridge. During the retreat of Confederate General Robert E. Lee's Army of Northern Virginia during the Appomattox Campaign, the Confederates had moved north of the river, except for a rear guard provided by Longstreet's First Corps at Rice's Station on the southern bank. The bridges had to be protected on April 6 and then destroyed on April 7 to delay the pursuit of the Confederates by the Union Army (Army of the Potomac, Army of the James and Army of the Shenandoah) under Lieutenant General Ulysses S. Grant.

On April 6, Longstreet dispatched 1,200 Confederate cavalry under Major General Thomas L. Rosser to protect the bridges from Union raiders. Union Major General Edward Ord, commanding the Army of the James, sent about 900 men under Colonel (Brevet Brigadier General) Theodore Read (Ord's chief of staff) to burn the bridge. This force consisted of the 123rd Ohio Infantry and the 54th Pennsylvania Infantry, commanded by Lieutenant Colonel Horace Kellogg of the 123rd Ohio, and three companies (80 troopers) of the 4th Massachusetts Cavalry under Colonel Francis Washburn. The cavalry reached the bridge before the main Confederate force, chased away some poorly armed home guards, and secured the south end of the bridge.

== Battles ==
While Washburn prepared to set fire to the bridge, three brigades of Confederate cavalrymen arrived and conducted a dismounted attack against the Union infantry, which was waiting near the Watson farmhouse, about half mile to the south. Hearing sounds of battle, Washburn and his men rejoined the infantry, and unaware that he was facing two divisions of cavalry, Read ordered a mounted charge by the 4th Massachusetts. The ferocious charge forced through the Confederate line of Colonel Thomas T. Munford and dissolved into hand-to-hand combat. Read exchanged gunfire with Confederate James Dearing during the fighting and was killed. Dearing was mortally wounded and died on April 22. Washburn was also mortally wounded and died 22 April 1865. The Confederates counterattacked and separated the cavalry from their supporting infantry. After another attack, the Union troopers were surrounded, and all were killed, wounded, or captured. Colonel Reuben B. Boston of the 5th Virginia Cavalry was killed in the attack. Both Read and Washburn received ranks of Brevet Brigadier General.

The survivors of the Confederate Second Corps, under Major General John B. Gordon, escaped from their defeat at the Battle of Sailor's Creek and crossed the High Bridge to the north side of the river while Major General William Mahone's division secured the bridge. The rest of Lee's army moved on to Farmville and a rendezvous with trains of rations.

Early on April 7, while Mahone's men were attempting to set fire to the High Bridge and wagon bridge, the Union II Corps commanded by Major General Andrew A. Humphreys arrived on the scene. Humphreys's second division under Brigadier General Francis C. Barlow, including the 19th Maine Volunteer Infantry Regiment, charged the burning structure and saved a large section of the railroad bridge, preventing major damage. They crossed the lower wagon bridge to move on Lee's flank and forced the hungry Confederates to resume their retreat before re-provisioning themselves.

== Aftermath ==
With 47 Union casualties (plus 800 captured) versus only about 100 Confederate casualties, the first battle on the bridge seemed to favor the Confederates. However, the second battle, in which Union troops successfully extinguished the fire, crossed the bridge, and forced the Confederates to flee along a specific path, proved to be a decisive tactical victory, and may have shortened the war by several days.

As a result, Lee was forced to continue his march to the west under pressure, depriving some of his men the opportunity to receive rations from Farmville that they desperately needed. On the night of April 7, Lee received from Grant a letter proposing that the Army of Northern Virginia should surrender. Lee demurred, retaining one last hope that his army could get to Appomattox Station before he was trapped. He returned a noncommittal letter asking about the surrender terms "Unconditional Surrender" Grant might propose.

The next morning, Lee's troops moved toward Appomattox Station, 25 miles (40 km) west, where a ration train was expected to be waiting. Union forces were, however, already moving to capture the supply train.

== Battlefield preservation ==
The Civil War Trust (a division of the American Battlefield Trust) and its partners have acquired and preserved 176 acres (0.71 km^{2}) of the battlefield. The acreage is part of the High Bridge Trail State Park, which includes a 31-mile trail and the majestic High Bridge, which is more than 2,500 feet long and sits 130 feet above the Appomattox River. The piers of the original Civil War-era bridge still stand.
