= Strathmore (ship) =

British ship

History

United Kingdom
- Name: Strathmore
- Out of service: 1 July 1875
- Fate: wrecked in the Crozet Islands

Strathmore was a British ship in the 1870s.

On 1 July 1875, while on a voyage from Dundee in the United Kingdom to Otago, New Zealand, the ship was wrecked off the Crozet Islands. The passengers and crew were considered dead after the ship did not arrive at its final destination. However, 44 crew and passengers managed to survive on a small island by eating eggs and geese, albatrosses, and other seabirds. They also ate root vegetables and fish. Five people died because of the low temperature at the island.

After seven months, they were rescued on 22 January 1876 by the American whaler Young Phoenix, captained by David Lewis Gifford.
