= Francis Washburn =

Officer in the Union Army (1838–1865)

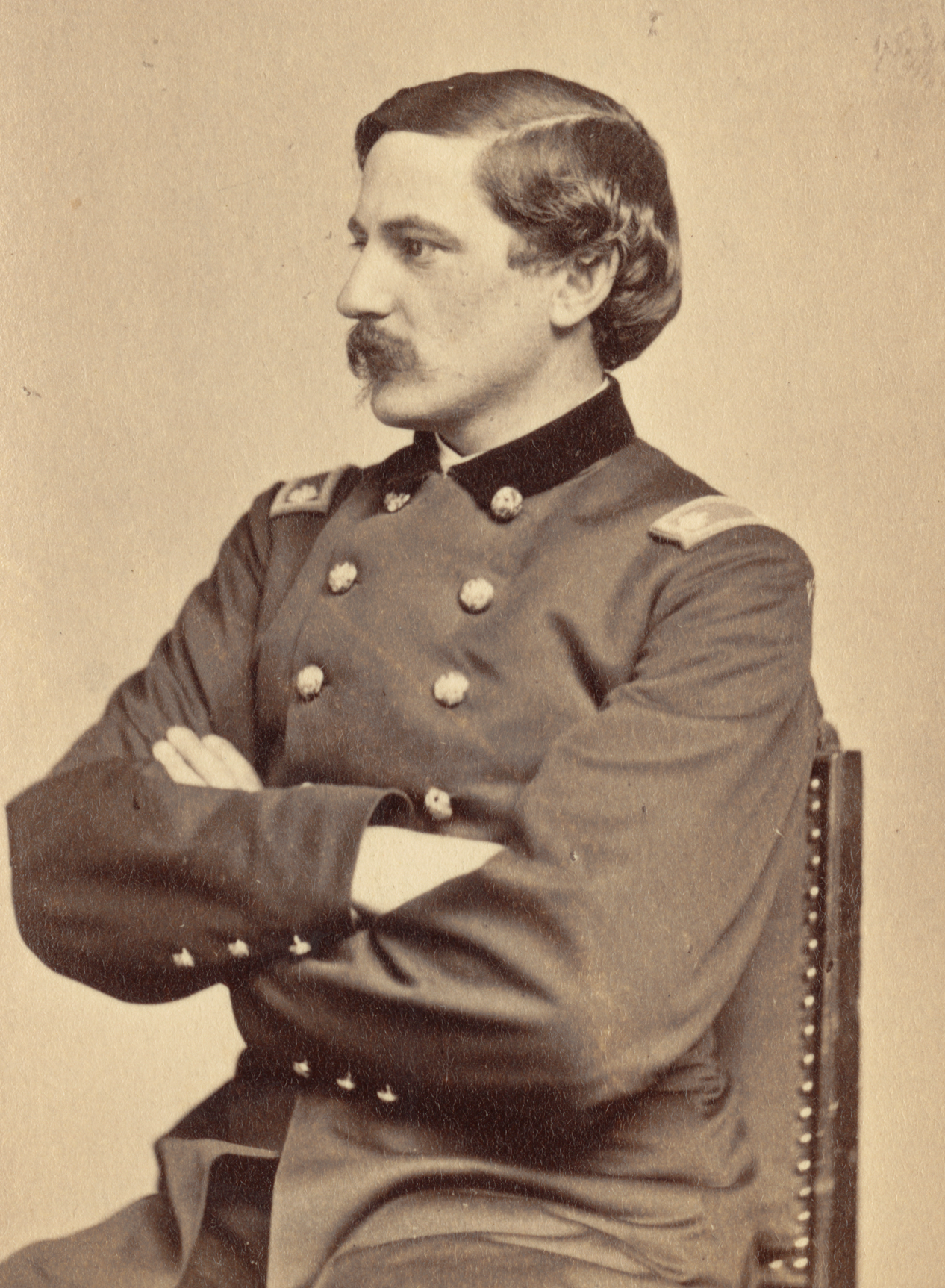
- Col. Francis Washburn (c. 1865)
- Born: July 6, 1838; Lancaster, Massachusetts, US
- Died: April 22, 1865; Worcester County, Massachusetts, US
- Military career
- Allegiance: Union
- Branch: Union Army
- Rank: Colonel; Bvt. Brigadier general
- Battles: American Civil War; Appomattox Campaign; Battle of High Bridge (DOW)

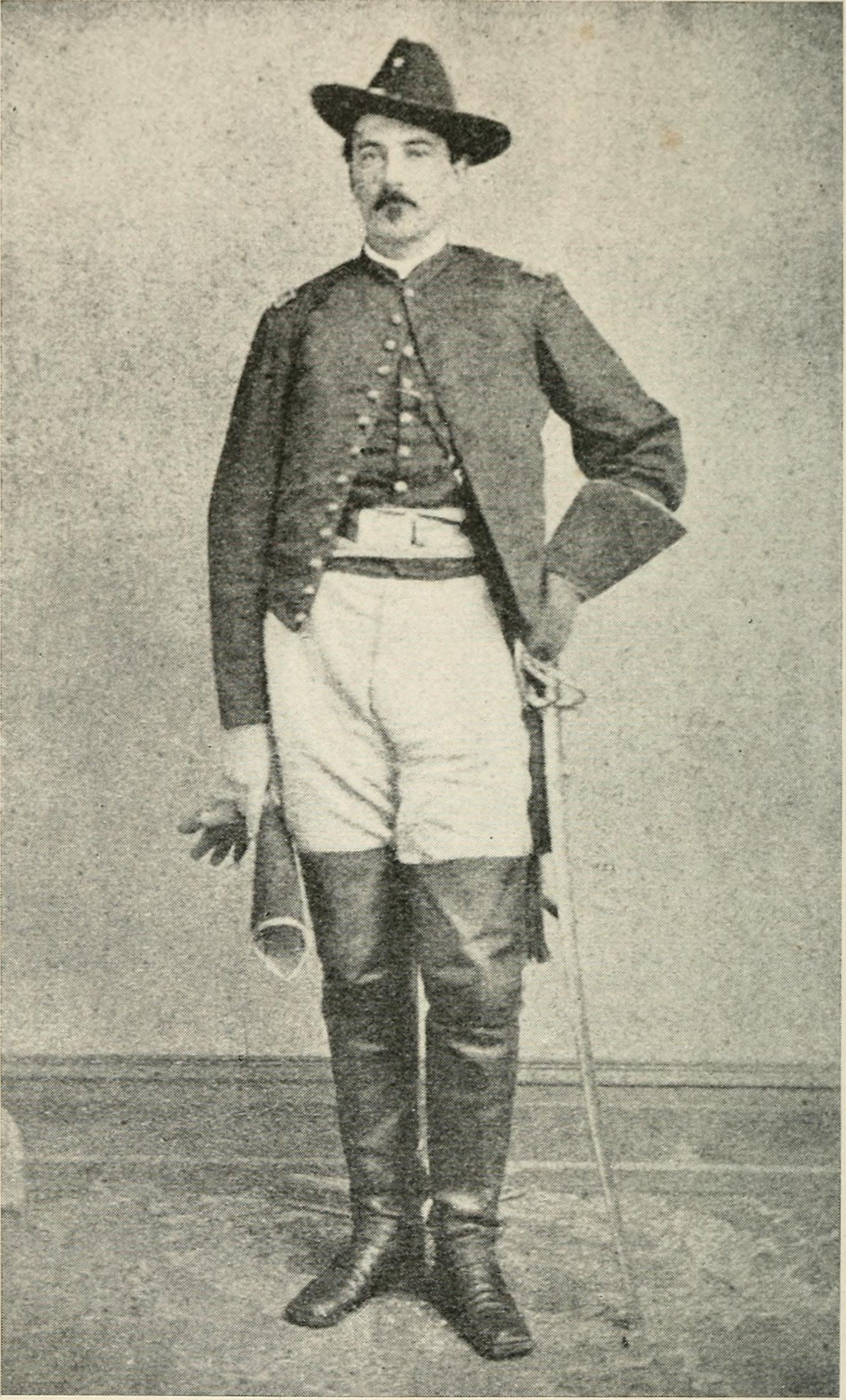
Capt. Francis Washburn (c. 1863)

Francis Washburn (July 6, 1838 – April 22, 1865) was an officer in the Union Army during the American Civil War.

== Life ==
Francis Washburn was born in Lancaster, Massachusetts on July 6, 1838. He was commissioned a second lieutenant in the 1st Massachusetts Cavalry on December 26, 1861; first lieutenant on March 7, 1862; captain of the 2nd Massachusetts Cavalry on January 26, 1863; lieutenant colonel of the 4th Massachusetts Cavalry on February 4, 1864; colonel on February 25, 1865; and finally, brevet brigadier general of volunteers on April 6, 1865, for gallantry and meritorious service at the Battle of High Bridge, Virginia, where he was wounded, and of which he died on April 22, 1865. (Note: wounded April 6, 1865, died April 22, 1865.) He was 26.

== Ranks ==
- Colonel, USV
- Brigadier general, USV (April 6, 1865)
