= William Lee Apthorp =

American surveyor, military leader (1837–1879)

- Born: August 31, 1837; Lee County, Georgia, U.S.
- Died: January 24, 1879 (aged 41); Springfield, New Jersey, U.S.
- Burial place: Saint Stephens Episcopal Cemetery, Millburn, New Jersey, U.S.
- Other names: Wm. Lee Apthorp
- Education: Dartmouth College
- Occupation(s): Military leader, state surveyor, musician, teacher, dairy farmer
- Known for: Florida's first state surveyor, Lt. Colonel of the 34th United States Colored Infantry Regiment
- Spouse: Charlotte Child (m. 1863–1879; his death)
- Children: 5

William Lee Apthorp (August 31, 1837 – January 24, 1879) was an American military leader, and Florida's first state surveyor. He also worked as a music teacher, and dairy farmer. During the American Civil War, he served as a Lt. Colonel in the Union Army and led a regiment of African American soldiers. He remained in Florida after the war and served as a surveyor, before moving to New Jersey and operating a dairy farm until his death.

== Early life and education ==
He was born on August 31, 1837, in Lee County, Georgia. Some record have him born near Fort Madison, Iowa. His parents were Mary Green (née Thurston) and William Perkins Apthorp. He moved with his family to Iowa as a child.

Apthorp attended Denmark Academy (in Iowa), and the preparatory school at Iowa College in Davenport. He graduated from Dartmouth College in 1859.

== Military service and career ==
In the Union Army, he served as a captain of Company B, Second South Carolina Loyal Volunteers commanding African American soldiers. He was promoted to Lt. Colonel of what became the 34th United States Colored Infantry Regiment in 1863.

In 1863, Apthorp and Charlotte Child's married, and they had five children. His father-in law was John Child, from Eton, England.

In August 1867, he was appointed chief clerk at the United States Surveyor General's office in Tallahassee, Florida. He remained in that role until October 1875. This was followed by a role as a clerk at the State Land Office in Florida from 1876–1878, where he published the noted 1877 map of Florida, which was regarded as one of the best-made maps of the state at the time.

Ossian B. Hart (the future governor of Florida), chose Apthorp to be his private secretary.

Apthorp wrote the manuscript Montgomery’s Raids in Florida, Georgia, and South Carolina about the men serving under James Montgomery and Thomas W. Higginson from personal experience. Higginson commanded a "colored" regiment and wrote about his war experiences.

== Death and legacy ==
Apthorp died of pneumonia on January 24, 1879, in Springfield, New Jersey. He is buried at Saint Stephens Episcopal Cemetery in Millburn, New Jersey.

Montgomery’s Raids in Florida, Georgia, and South Carolina was donated to the Historical Museum of Southern Florida as part of the Apthorp Family Papers, 1741–1964.
