= Pat Scanlan =

Australian rules footballer

Personal information
- Full name: Patrick James Scanlan
- Born: 7 July 1878; Cobden, Victoria
- Died: 16 July 1938 (aged 60); Elingamite, near Cobden, Victoria
- Original team: Cobden

Playing career^{1}
Years	Club	Games (Goals)
1898–99	Melbourne	6 (2)
- ^{1} Playing statistics correct to the end of 1899.

Patrick James Scanlan (7 July 1878 – 16 July 1938) was an Australian rules footballer who played with Melbourne in the Victorian Football League (VFL).

== Family ==
The son of Michael Scanlan (1836-1922), and Mary Ann Scanlan (1849-1930), née Spall, Patrick James Scanlan was born at Cobden, Victoria on 7 July 1878.

He married Margaret Agnes Hogan (1876–1964) in 1902. They had nine children; one of which, a son, died in his infancy.

== Football ==
He made his debut (kicking two of the team's five goals) for Melbourne, against St Kilda, at the MCG, on 25 June 1898. He played in another four senior matches in 1898, and one in 1899.

== Death ==
He died at Elingamite, near Cobden, Victoria on 16 July 1938.
