= 4th Massachusetts Cavalry Regiment =

4th Massachusetts Cavalry Regiment, U.S. Volunteers
- Active: December 26, 1863 - November 26, 1865
- Country: United States
- Allegiance: Union
- Branch: Cavalry
- Engagements: Battle of Olustee; Siege of Petersburg; First Battle of Deep Bottom (Companies F & G); Battle of Honey Hill; Battle of Gainesville (2 companies, 2nd battalion); Appomattox Campaign; Third Battle of Petersburg; Battle of High Bridge; Battle of Appomattox Court House; Battle of Dingle's Mill

The 4th Massachusetts Volunteer Cavalry Regiment was a cavalry regiment that served in the Union Army during the American Civil War.

== Service ==
The 4th Massachusetts Cavalry was organized in Readville, Massachusetts beginning December 26, 1863 and mustered in under the command of Colonel Francis Washburn.

The regiment was attached to Light Brigade, District of Florida, X Corps, Department of the South, to April 1864. Unattached, Department of Virginia and North Carolina, X Corps, XVIII Corps, XXIV Corps, and XXV Corps, Department of Virginia and North Carolina, to August 1865. Department of Virginia to November 1865.

The 4th Massachusetts Cavalry mustered out of service on November 14, 1865 and was discharged at Boston, Massachusetts on November 26, 1865.

== Detailed service ==
First Battalion (Companies I, K, L, and M) was initially formed as Independent Battalion, Massachusetts Cavalry (formerly the 3rd Battalion, 1st Massachusetts Volunteer Cavalry). It was assigned to the regiment on February 12, 1864. Expedition from Jacksonville, Fla., to Lake City, Fla., February 7–22, 1864. Battle of Olustee, Fla., February 20. McGrath's Creek, Cedar Run, March 1. Cedar Run April 2. Ordered to Bermuda Hundred, Va., arriving there May 8. Operations against Fort Darling April 12–16. Bermuda Hundred May 20–30. Jordan's Crossing and Petersburg June 9. Siege operations against Petersburg and Richmond June 16, 1864 to April 2, 1865. At Headquarters, Department of Virginia and North Carolina, June 21 to August 15, 1864. At Headquarters, X Corps, until December 1864. Demonstration on the north side of the James River August 13–20. Strawberry Plains August 14–18. Flusser's Mills August 18–19. (Company M detached at Harrison's Landing on outpost duty August 23, 1864 to March 1865.) Before Petersburg August 24 to September 28. Chaffin's Farm, New Market Heights, September 28–30. Harrison's Landing October 13 (Company M). Fair Oaks October 27–28. Expedition into Charles City and Henrico Counties November 1–5. Duty before Richmond until March 1865. At Headquarters, Department of Virginia and North Carolina, December 1864 to April 1865 (Companies I, L, and M). At Headquarters, XXIV Corps, December 1864 to April 1865 (Company K). Appomattox Campaign March 28-April 9, 1865. Fall of Petersburg April 2. High Bridge, Farmville, April 6–7. Appomattox Court House April 9, Surrender of Lee and his army. Duty at Richmond until November.

Second Battalion (Companies A, B, C, and D) sailed from Boston for Hilton Head, S.C. on the steamer Western Metropolis March 20, 1864, arriving April 1. Picket and outpost duty at Hilton Head until June. Expedition to Ashepoo River May 22–26 (2 companies). Two Companies moved to Jacksonville, Fla., June 6–8, and served duty there until January 1865, participating in a skirmish at Front Creek July 15, 1864. Raid from Jacksonville upon Baldwin July 23–28. Skirmish at South Fork, Black Creek, July 24. St. Mary's Trestle July 26. Raid on Florida Railroad August 15–19. Gainesville August 17. Magnolia October 24. Gum Swamp October 24. 2 Companies on duty at Hilton Head, S.C., June to November 1864. Expedition to John's Island, S.C., July 2–10. Operations against Battery Pringle July 4–9. Expedition to Boyd's Neck November 29–30. Battle of Honey Hill November 30. Expedition to Deveaux's Neck December 1–6. March to Charleston January 15-February 23, 1865. Potter's Expedition to Camden, S.C. April 5–25. Statesburg April 15. Occupation of Camden April 17. Boykin's Mills April 18. Denkin's Mills April 19. Beech Creek, near Statesburg, April 19. Duty in the Department of the South until muster out.

Third Battalion (Companies E, F, G, and H) sailed from Boston for Hilton Head, S.C., on the steamer Western Metropolis April 23, 1864, arriving April 27. Moved to Newport News, Va., May 1–3, then to City Point May 23, and duty there scouting, picketing, and on the fortifications until June 16. Duty at Bermuda Hundred until August 23. Companies E and H at Headquarters of XVIII Corps June 16-December 4, and at Headquarters of XXV Corps December 1864 to April 1865. Company F at Headquarters of XXIV Corps December 1864 to April 1865. Company G detached at Yorktown and Williamsburg, Va., August 23, 1864 to April 1865. Occupation of Richmond April 3, 1865 (Companies E and H). Company F on Appomattox Campaign March 28-April 9. High Bridge, Farmville, April 6–7. Appomattox Court House April 9. Surrender of Lee and his army.

== Casualties ==
The regiment lost a total of 162 men during service; 4 officers and 28 enlisted men killed or mortally wounded, 2 officers and 128 enlisted men died of disease.

== Commanders ==
- Colonel Francis Washburn - mortally wounded at the Battle of High Bridge
- Lieutenant Colonel Horatio Jenkins, Jr.
- Major Atherton A. Stevens, Jr. - commander of First Battalion
- Major David B. Keith - commander of Second Battalion
- Major Louis Cabot - commander of Third Battalion

== Notable members ==
- Private David L. Gifford, Company B - Medal of Honor recipient for action at Ashepoo River, South Carolina

== See also ==
- List of Massachusetts Civil War Units
- Massachusetts in the American Civil War
