= William Downey (Medal of Honor) =

Irish soldier in American Civil War

- Born: c. 1832; Limerick, Ireland
- Died: June 30, 1909 (aged 76–77); New Bedford, Massachusetts, US
- Burial place: Saint Mary's Cemetery, New Bedford, Massachusetts, US
- Military career
- Allegiance: United States of America
- Branch: United States Army
- Service years: 1863 - 1865
- Rank: Private
- Unit: 4th Massachusetts Volunteer Cavalry Regiment - Company B
- Awards: Medal of Honor

William Downey (c. 1832 – June 30, 1909) was an Irish soldier who fought in the American Civil War. Downey received the United States' highest award for bravery during combat, the Medal of Honor, for his action at Ashepoo River, South Carolina, on May 24, 1864. He was honored with the award on January 21, 1897.

== Biography ==
Downey was born in Limerick, Ireland, in 1832, and joined the US Army from Fall River, Massachusetts in September 1863. He was captured at the Battle of Gainesville, and paroled in April 1865. He was mustered out in June 1865.

Downey died in New Bedford, Massachusetts on June 30, 1909, and his remains are interred there at Saint Mary's Cemetery.

== Medal of Honor citation ==
Volunteered as a member of a boatcrew which went to the rescue of a large number of Union soldiers on board the stranded steamer Boston, and with great gallantry assisted in conveying them to shore, being exposed during the entire time to a heavy fire from a Confederate batter.

== See also ==
- List of American Civil War Medal of Honor recipients: A–F
