= Circles of latitude between the 45th parallel south and the 50th parallel south =

Circles of latitude

Following are circles of latitude between the 45th parallel south and the 50th parallel south:

== 46th parallel south ==
46th parallel south (interactive map)

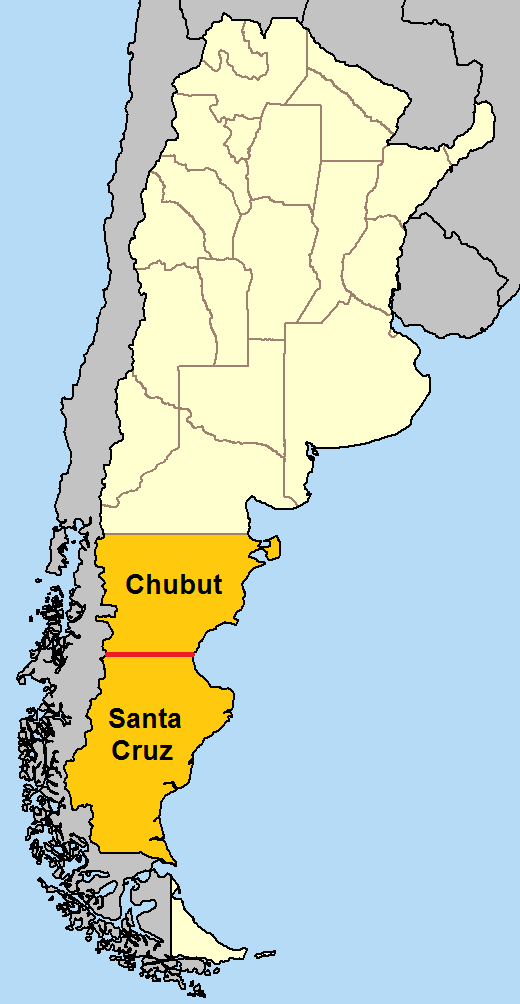
In Argentina, the 46th parallel south defines the border between Chubut Province and Santa Cruz Province.

The 46th parallel south is a circle of latitude that is 46 degrees south of the Earth's equatorial plane. It crosses the Atlantic Ocean, the Indian Ocean, Australasia, the Pacific Ocean and South America.

At this latitude the sun is visible for 15 hours, 45 minutes during the December solstice and 8 hours, 38 minutes during the June solstice. This holds true regardless of longitude.

The largest city south of the 46th parallel is Punta Arenas.

=== Around the world ===
Starting at the Prime Meridian and heading eastwards, the parallel 46° south passes through:

Coordinates	Country, territory or ocean	Notes
46°0′S 0°0′E	Atlantic Ocean	
46°0′S 20°0′E	Indian Ocean	Passing between Île aux Cochons and Îlots des Apôtres in the Crozet Islands, French Southern and Antarctic Lands
46°0′S 147°0′E	Pacific Ocean	Tasman Sea
46°0′S 166°26′E	New Zealand	Fiordland, passing through Lake Hauroko and Chalky Sound; Southland Region, close to the townships of Nightcaps and Mandeville; Otago Region, passing south of the city of Dunedin, close to the townships of Waitahuna and Henley
46°0′S 170°15′E	Pacific Ocean	
46°0′S 75°2′W	Chile	Taitao Peninsula, Moraleda Channel, also passes near Balmaceda, Aysén Region
46°0′S 71°38′W	Argentina	Border between Chubut Province and Santa Cruz Province; Passes near Comodoro Rivadavia, Chubut Province
46°0′S 67°35′W	Atlantic Ocean	

== 47th parallel south ==
47th parallel south (interactive map)

The 47th parallel south is a circle of latitude that is 47 degrees south of the Earth's equatorial plane. It crosses the Atlantic Ocean, the Indian Ocean, Australasia, the Pacific Ocean and South America.

At this latitude, the sun is visible for 15 hours and 54 minutes during the December solstice and 8 hours and 30 minutes during the June solstice. This holds true regardless of longitude.

=== Around the world ===
Starting at the Prime Meridian and heading eastwards, the parallel 47° south passes through:

Coordinates	Country, territory or ocean	Notes
47°0′S 0°0′E	Atlantic Ocean	
47°0′S 20°0′E	Indian Ocean	Passing just south of the Prince Edward Islands, South Africa
47°0′S 147°0′E	Pacific Ocean	Tasman Sea
47°0′S 167°42′E	New Zealand	Stewart Island
47°0′S 168°13′E	Pacific Ocean	
47°0′S 74°3′W	Chile	Gulf of San Esteban and Northern Patagonian Ice Field, Aysén Region
47°0′S 71°52′W	Argentina	Santa Cruz Province
47°0′S 66°48′W	Atlantic Ocean	

== 48th parallel south ==
48th parallel south (interactive map)

The 48th parallel south is a circle of latitude that is 48 degrees south of the Earth's equatorial plane. It crosses the Atlantic Ocean, the Indian Ocean, the Pacific Ocean and South America.

At this latitude the sun is visible for 16 hours, 3 minutes during the December solstice and 8 hours, 22 minutes during the June solstice. If the latitude in the southern hemisphere is 48º50' or smaller, it is possible to view both astronomical dawn and dusk every day of the month of January. At the latitude of 48°33′38.58804” South, which is about 62.3 km (38.7 mi) south of this parallel, is the parallel where twilight/nighttime boundary on the December Solstice.

=== Around the world ===
Starting at the Prime Meridian and heading eastwards, the parallel 48° south passes through:

Coordinates	Country, territory or ocean	Notes
48°0′S 0°0′E	Atlantic Ocean	
48°0′S 20°0′E	Indian Ocean	
48°0′S 147°0′E	Pacific Ocean	
48°0′S 75°18′W	Chile	Aysén Region
48°0′S 72°25′W	Argentina	Santa Cruz Province
48°0′S 65°55′W	Atlantic Ocean	

== 49th parallel south ==
49th parallel south (interactive map)

The 49th parallel south is a circle of latitude that is 49 degrees south of the Earth's equatorial plane. It crosses the Atlantic Ocean, the Indian Ocean, the Pacific Ocean and South America.

At this latitude the sun is visible for 16 hours, 13 minutes during the December solstice and 8 hours, 14 minutes during the June solstice.

This latitude also roughly corresponds to the minimum latitude in which astronomical twilight can last all night near the summer solstice. All-night astronomical twilight lasts about from December 11 to January 1 of the following year. At midnight on the summer solstice, the altitude of the sun is about −17.56°.

=== Around the world ===
Starting at the Prime Meridian and heading eastwards, the parallel 49° south passes through:

Coordinates	Country, territory or ocean	Notes
49°0′S 0°0′E	Atlantic Ocean	
49°0′S 20°0′E	Indian Ocean	
49°0′S 68°48′E	French Southern and Antarctic Lands	Kerguelen Islands
49°0′S 69°36′E	Indian Ocean	
49°0′S 147°0′E	Pacific Ocean	Passing north of the Antipodes Islands, New Zealand
49°0′S 75°35′W	Chile	Wellington Island, the English Narrows and mainland, Magallanes Region
49°0′S 72°59′W	Argentina	Santa Cruz Province
49°0′S 67°31′W	Atlantic Ocean	

== 50th parallel south ==
50th parallel south (interactive map)

The 50th parallel south is a circle of latitude that is 50 degrees south of the Earth's equatorial plane. It crosses the Atlantic Ocean, the Indian Ocean, the Pacific Ocean and South America.

At this latitude the sun is visible for 16 hours, 23 minutes during the December solstice and 8 hours, 4 minutes during the June solstice. On December 21, the sun is at 63.44 degrees in the sky and on June 21, the sun is at 16.56 degrees in the sky. During the summer solstice, nighttime does not get beyond astronomical twilight, a condition which lasts throughout the month of December. It is possible to view both astronomical dawn and dusk every day of the month of November.

The maximum altitude of the Sun is > 25.00º in April and > 18.00º in May.

The 50th parallel is the northerly boundary of the Dependencies of the Falkland Islands, the southerly boundary being the 60th parallel south.

=== Around the world ===
Starting at the Prime Meridian and heading eastwards, the parallel 50° south passes through:

Coordinates	Country, territory or ocean	Notes
50°0′S 0°0′E	Atlantic Ocean	
50°0′S 20°0′E	Indian Ocean	Passing just south of the Kerguelen Islands, French Southern and Antarctic Lands
50°0′S 147°0′E	Pacific Ocean	Passing just south of the Antipodes Islands, New Zealand
50°0′S 74°53′W	Chile	Patagonic Archipelago and mainland, Magallanes Region
50°0′S 73°26′W	Argentina	Santa Cruz Province
50°0′S 67°54′W	Atlantic Ocean	

== See also ==
- Circles of latitude between the 40th parallel south and the 45th parallel south
- Circles of latitude between the 50th parallel south and the 55th parallel south
