= Patrick Scanlan =

Soldier and veteran of the American Civil War

- Born: c. 1838; Ireland
- Died: September 5, 1903; Farmington, Connecticut
- Burial place: Saint Mary's Cemetery, Avon, Connecticut
- Military career
- Allegiance: United States of America
- Branch: United States Army; Union Army
- Rank: Private
- Units: Company A, 4th Massachusetts Volunteer Cavalry Regiment
- Conflicts: Ashepoo River, South Carolina
- Awards: Medal of Honor

Patrick Scanlan (c. 1838 – September 5, 1903) was an Irish-born soldier who fought for the Union Army during the American Civil War. He received the Medal of Honor for valor.

== Biography ==
Scanlan received the Medal of Honor on January 21, 1897, for his actions at Ashepoo River, South Carolina on May 24, 1864, while with Company A of the 4th Massachusetts Volunteer Cavalry Regiment.

== Medal of Honor citation ==
Citation:

The President of the United States of America, in the name of Congress, takes pleasure in presenting the Medal of Honor to Private Patrick Scanlan, United States Army, for extraordinary heroism on 24 May 1864, while serving with Company A, 4th Massachusetts Cavalry, in action at Ashepoo River, South Carolina. Private Scanlan volunteered as a member of a boat crew which went to the rescue of a large number of Union soldiers on board the stranded steamer Boston, and with great gallantry assisted in conveying them to shore, being exposed during the entire time to a heavy fire from a Confederate battery."

== See also ==
- List of American Civil War Medal of Honor recipients: Q–S
