= Forests of Mayotte National Nature Reserve =

Protected area on Mayotte

- réserve naturelle nationale des forêts de Mayotte
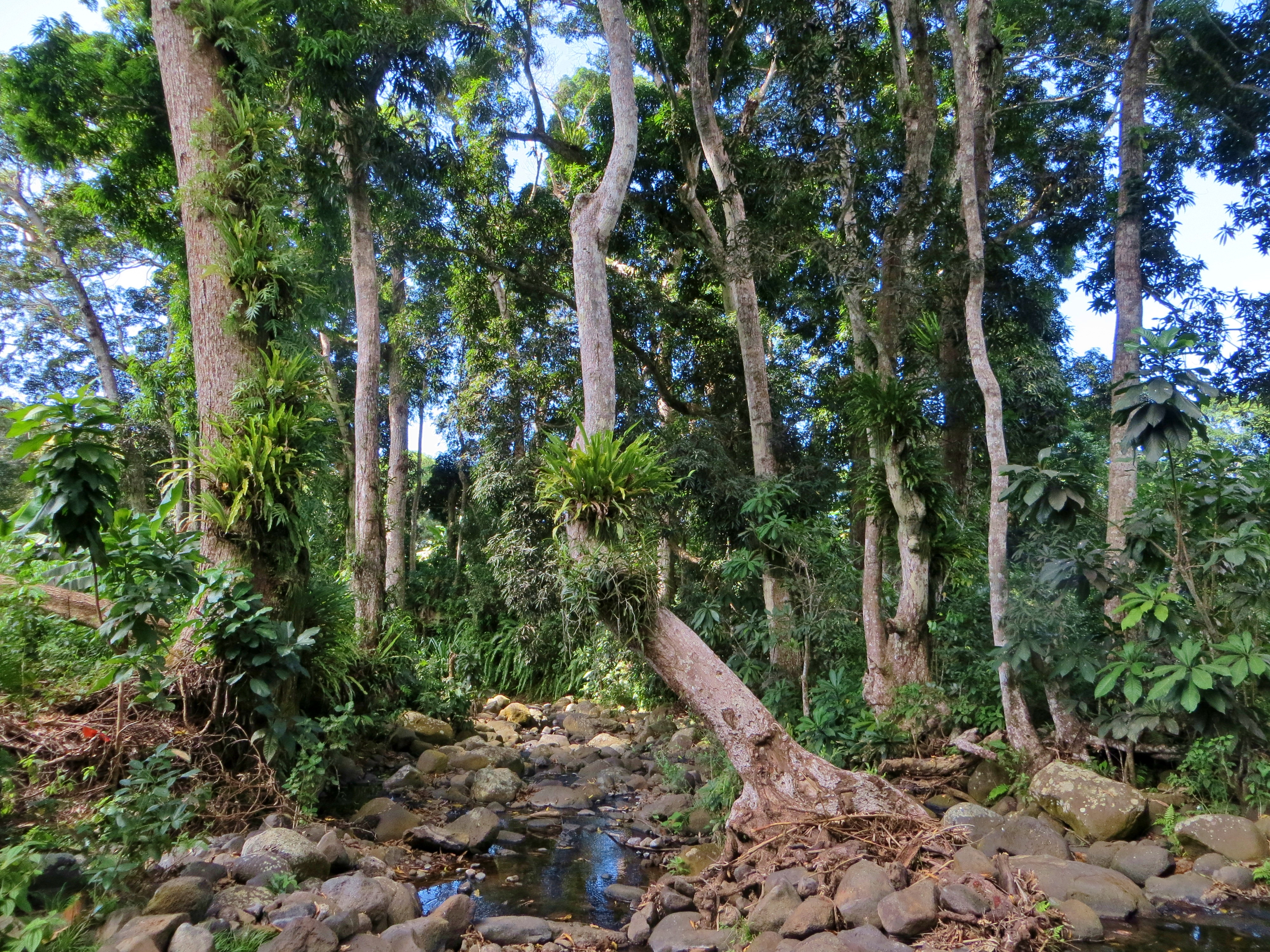
- Riparian forest near Passamaïnty, Mayotte

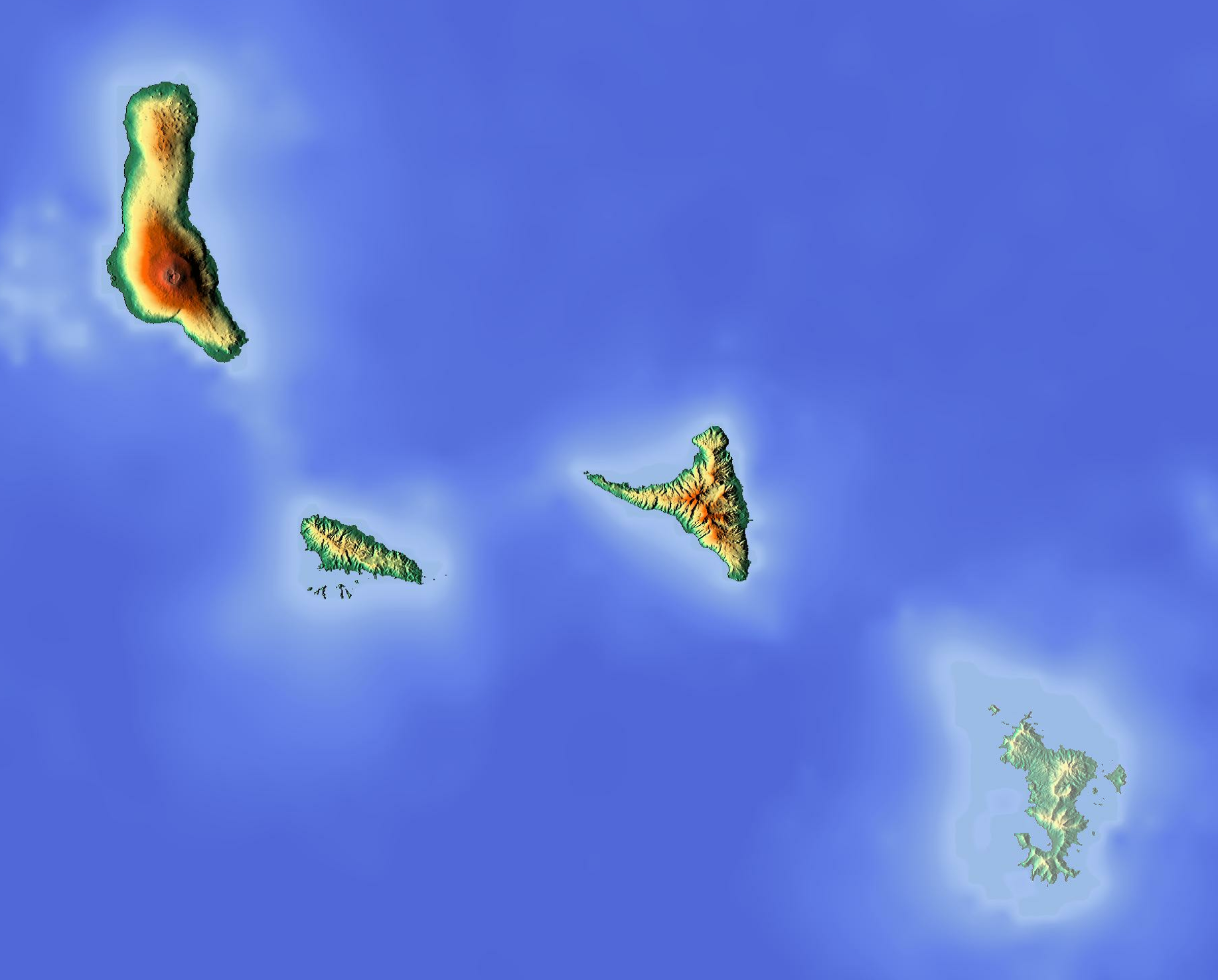
- Location within Comoros
- Coordinates: 12°45′49″S 45°10′22″E
- Area: 2,801 ha (10.81 sq mi)
- Designation: national nature reserve
- Established: 3 May 2021

The Forests of Mayotte National Nature Reserve (réserve naturelle nationale des forêts de Mayotte) is a protected area on Mayotte, an island overseas department of France in the Indian Ocean.

The reserve was created in 2021 to protect Mayotte's remnant primary forests, restore the island's secondary forests, and protect the island's native flora and fauna.

== Geography ==
The reserve consists of 2,801 hectares in 6 mountain forests on Grande-Terre, Mayotte's main island. The nature reserve includes 51% of Mayotte's reserve forest area and 7.5% of Mayotte's total land area. The protected areas include the island's highest peaks, which are both home to the island's most intact forests and the sources of most of the island's rivers and streams. The six forest areas are:

- Dziani Bolé and Hachiroungou on the island's northwest;
- Mount Mtsapéré (572 m), which is home to Mayotte's largest remaining forest;
- Mount Combani (481 m)
- Mount Bénara (660 m), Mayotte's highest peak;
- Sohoa forest on the island's western coast; and
- Mount Choungui (594 m) in the southern part of the island.

== Flora and fauna ==
Mayotte is part of the Comoros forests ecoregion. The predominant natural vegetation is humid tropical forest, although the islands's forests have been much reduced by human activity. The islands are home to many plant species, including many endemic species, and several endemic and limited-range species of birds, bats, reptiles, and insects.

The reserve contains small areas of primary forest, which are more or less intact, and larger areas of secondary forest, forests that have regrown after logging or clearing. Introduced species have proliferated on the island. Mayotte lost 1500 hectares of forest between 2011 and 2016, and 45% of Mayotte's native plant species are now threatened by habitat loss or competition with exotic species.

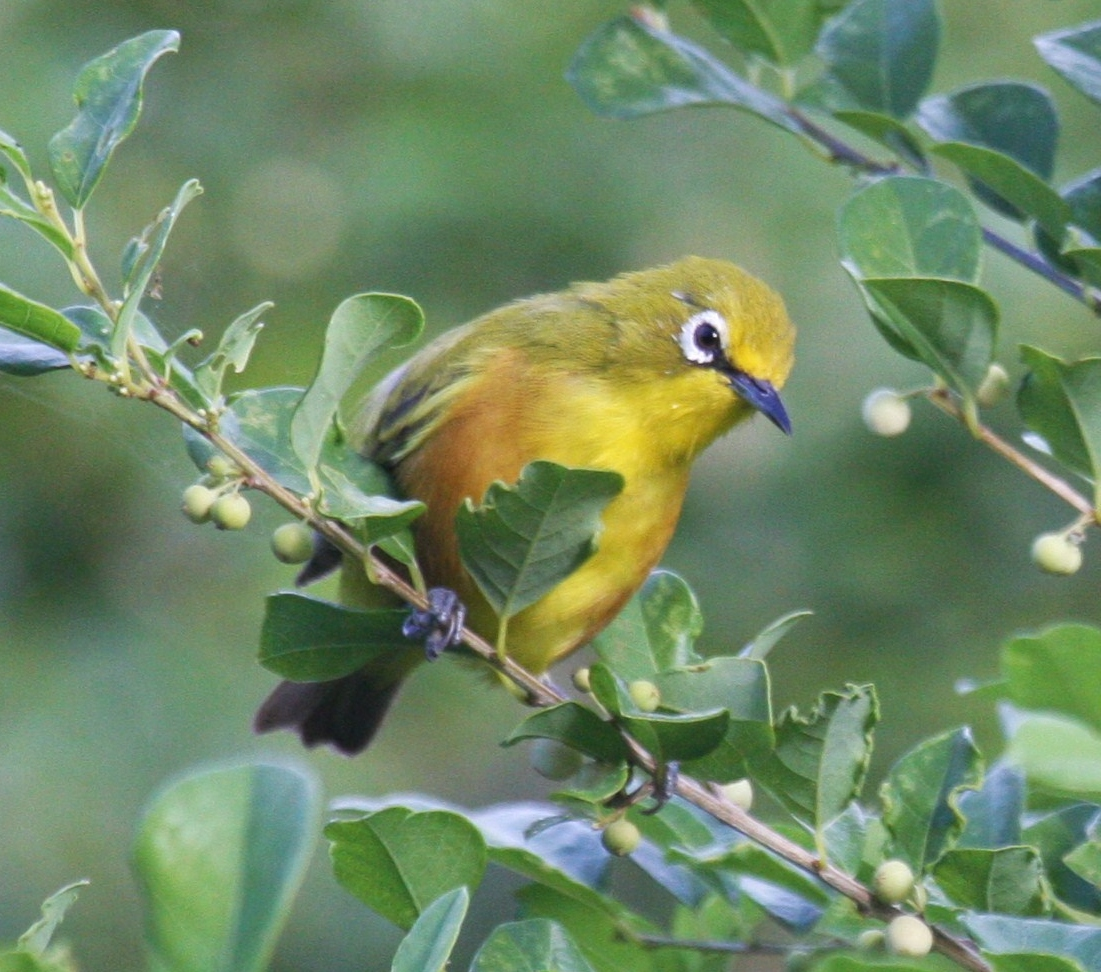
The Mayotte white-eye (Zosterops mayottensis)

Native birds include the Mayotte drongo (Dicrurus waldenii), Mayotte white-eye (Zosterops mayottensis), Mayotte scops owl (Otus mayottensis), and Mayotte sunbird (Cinnyris coquerellii), which are endemic to Mayotte, and the Comoro olive-pigeon (Columba pollenii), a Comoro endemic, and the Comoro blue pigeon (Alectroenas sganzini), endemic to the Comoros and Seychelles.

The reserve includes portions of four important bird areas on Mayotte – Crêtes du Nord (Dziani Bolé and Hachiroungou), Crêtes du Sud (Mount Choungui), Mlima Combani and Mlima Mtsapéré, and Mount Bénara.

== Conservation ==
The reserve was created on 3 May 2021 by the French government. Prior to creation of the reserve, the land was part of several forest reserves.

Logging (except for exotic tree removal as part of restoration projects), mining, grazing livestock, hunting and fishing, camping, use of non-emergency motor vehicles, and construction of buildings and roads are prohibited within the reserve.
