= Comoros forests =

Ecoregion in the Comoros islands

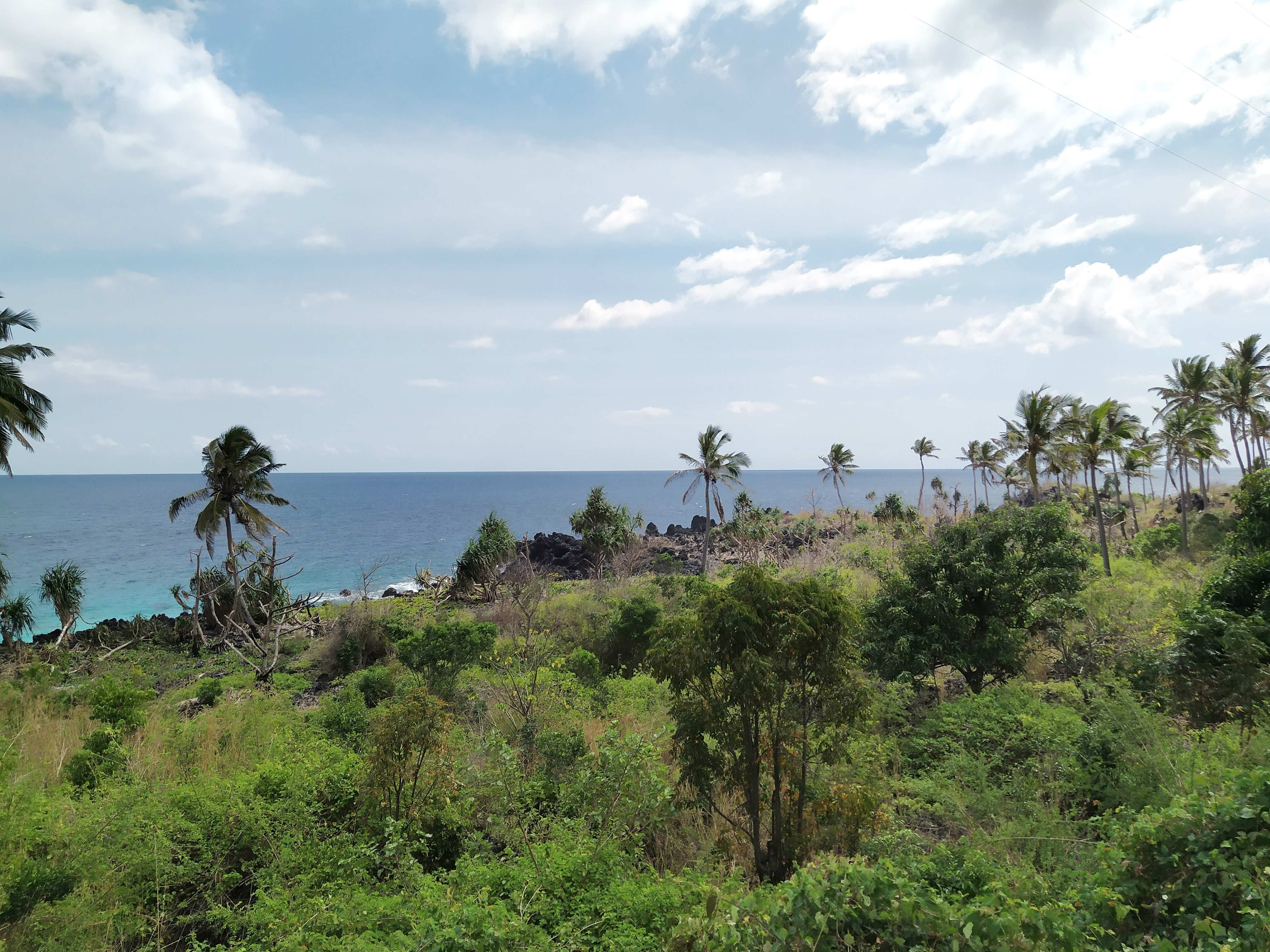
- Forest on Grande Comore

- Location of the Comoros Islands

Ecology
- Realm: Afrotropical
- Biome: Tropical and subtropical moist broadleaf forests

Geography
- Area: 2,100 km^{2} (810 sq mi)
- Countries: Comoros; Mayotte (an overseas region of France)
- Coordinates: 11.75°S 43.4°E

Conservation
- Conservation status: Critical/endangered
- Protected: 29.4%

The Comoros forests is a terrestrial ecoregion which covers the Comoro Islands, which lie in the Mozambique Channel between Madagascar and East Africa. These include four main islands: Grande Comore, Anjouan and Mohéli, of the Union of the Comoros, and Mayotte, a department and region of France.

These volcanic islands are rich in wildlife with endemic species including four endangered bird species living on Mount Karthala, the large active volcano on Grande Comore.

== Geography ==
The Comoros Islands are volcanic in origin. Mayotte is the easternmost and oldest of the islands, more than 8 million years old. It has one central island, known as Grande-Terre or Maore (368 km^{2}), and several smaller islets. The highest point on Mayotte is Mount Benara at 660 meters elevation. Grande Terre has a deeply indented coast with many bays, peninsulas, and rocky headlands, and is home to most of the Comoro Islands' mangroves. Mayotte is surrounded by a large lagoon, which is enclosed by an extensive barrier reef.

Anjouan (Ndzuani) is mountainous, with deeply incised valleys and sharp ridges. It has an area of 424 km^{2}, and its highest peaks are Mount Ntringui (1,595 meters) and Mount Trindrini (1,474 meters). It is a densely populated island, with most people living on the narrow coastal plain or in the interior valleys.

Mohéli (Mwali) has rugged terrain, with an east–west ridge running the length of the island and many small stream valleys. At 211 km^{2} it is the smallest of the major islands. The highest peak is Mount Mlédjélé (790 m) in the western part of the island. The island has an extensive fringing reef along the south shore, and eight small islets rise steeply from the lagoon.

Grande Comore (Ngazidja) is the largest (1,025 km^{2}) and westernmost island, with the most recent volcanic activity. There are two volcanic peaks on the island. Mount Karthala (2,361 m) is the highest peak in the archipelago. La Grille, at the northern end of the island, reaches 1,087 meters. The young volcanic soils on Grande Comore are very porous, and rain percolates rapidly into the ground instead of creating permanent rivers and streams.

== Climate ==
The islands have a wet tropical climate, with a hot rainy season, called Kashkazi, between October and April. The cool dry season, called Kuzi, extends through the rest of the year.

== Flora ==
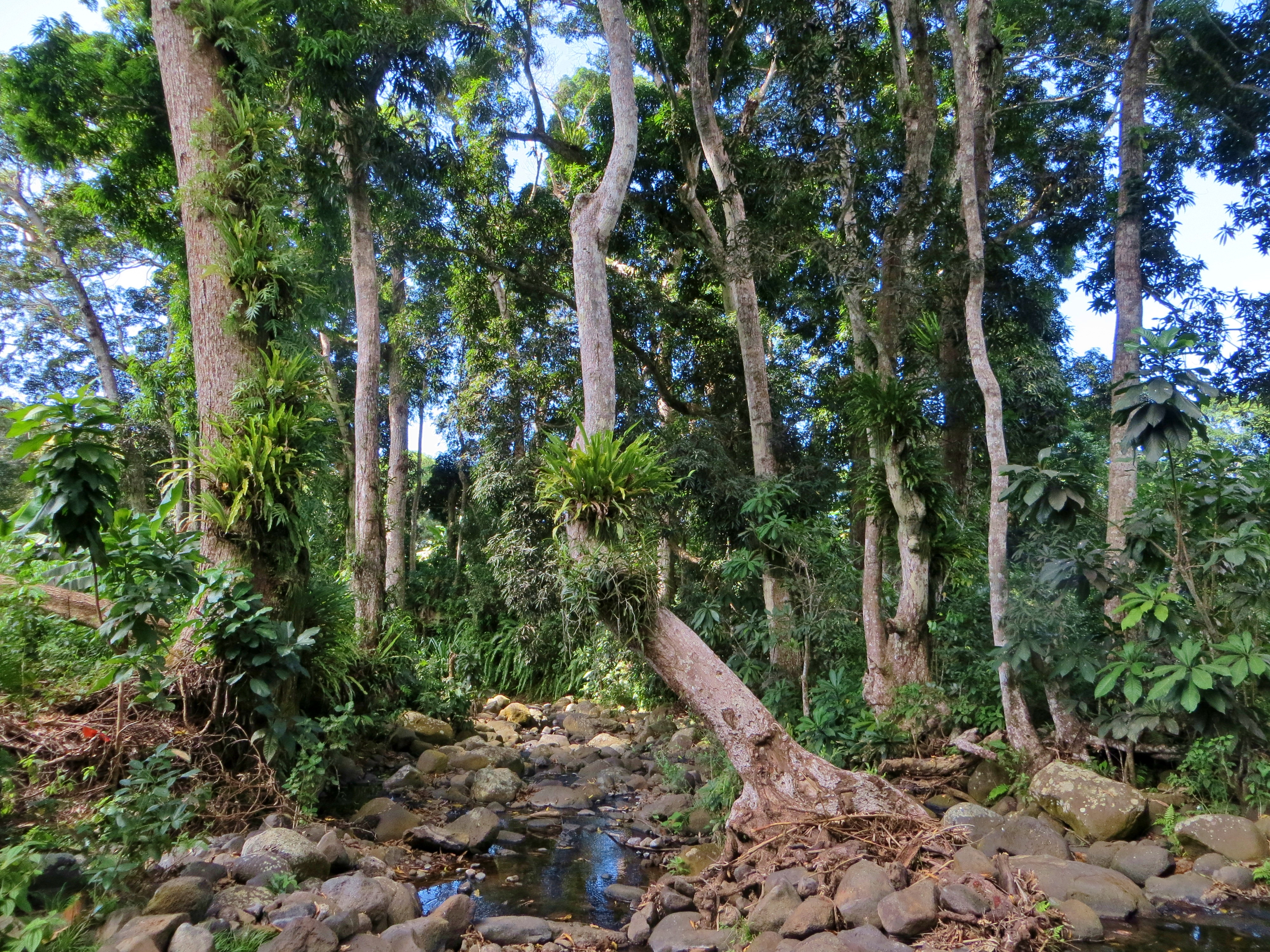
riparian forest near Passamaïnty, Mayotte

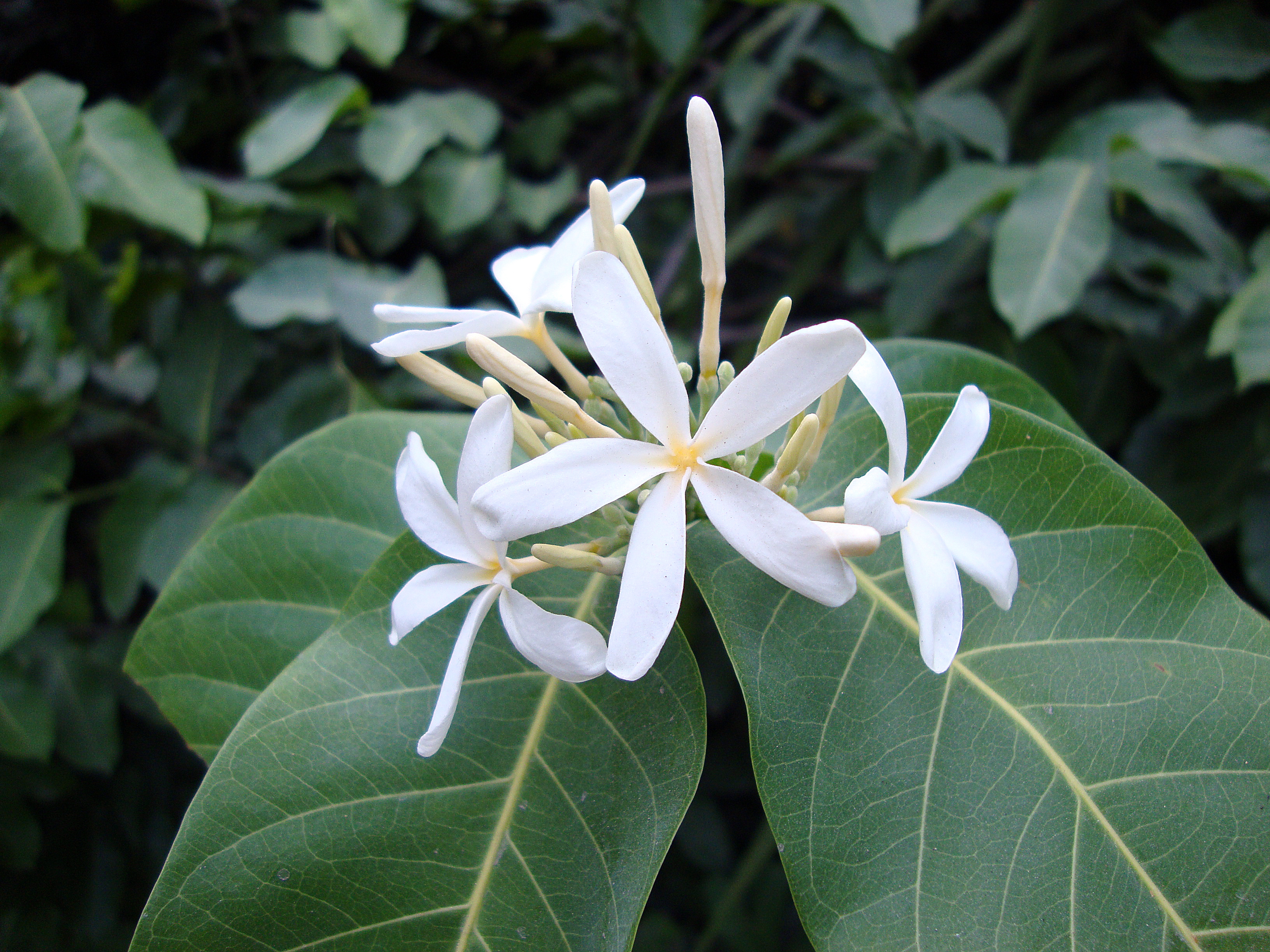
Saba comorensis

Formerly the natural vegetation on the islands was evergreen tropical moist forests, which extended from sea level to 1800 meters elevation. The lowland forests to 500 meters elevation and higher have mostly been cleared, but areas of relatively intact montane forest still exist on Grande Comore, Anjouan, and Mohéli, and second-growth montane forests are found on all four islands. Notable remnant forests include the southern slope of Mount Karthala on Grande Comore, the Moya Forest on Anjouan, and Mount Mlédjélé on Mohéli.

Canopy trees in the lower montane forests grow up to 20 or 30 meters high. Characteristic trees include Ocotea comorensis, Khaya madagascariensis, Olea capensis, Gambeya boiviniana, Prunus africana, and Filicium decipiens. Ephiphyes, including mosses, orchids, and lichens, are abundant. Tree ferns, including the endemic species Alsophila hildebrandtii and Alsophila kirkii, are common. In many forest areas cultivated food plants have replaced the native understory. On Anjouan the lower montane forests extend up to 1200 meters elevation.

Upper montane forests have a lower canopy, generally reaching less than 10 meters high on Anjouan. Tree ferns and lianas are common, and orchids, mosses, and lichens grow as epiphytes and in the understory. Upper montane forests extend to the highest peaks on Anjouan, and up to 1800 meters elevation on Grande Comore.

Stunted trees and heathlands, dominated by the giant heath Erica comorensis, grow between 1800 and 2200 meters on Mount Karthala, Grande Comore's central volcanic peak. Dry grasslands, including species of Poa, Agrostis, and Festuca, replace the heathlands in areas cleared by recent fires. Dry alpine grasslands with sparse herbs and grasses are found on the rocky summit.

Mangroves are found along the coasts, chiefly on Mayotte and the south coast of Mohéli. Characteristic species are Rhizophora mucronata, Bruguiera gymnorhiza, Avicennia marina, and Sonneratia alba.

== Fauna ==
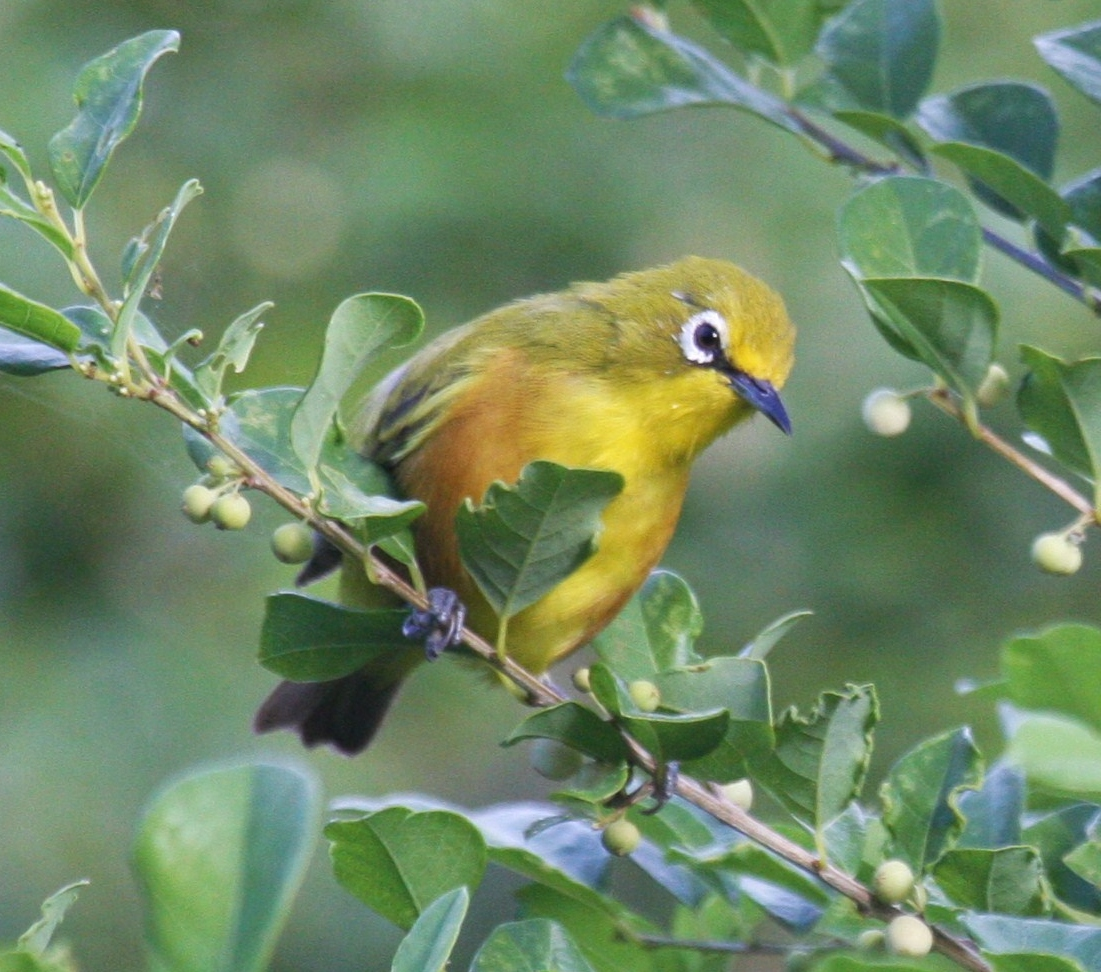
Mayotte white-eye (Zosterops mayottensis) on Mayotte

There are more birds, mammals, and reptiles than one would expect to find on an Indian Ocean island, including lemurs, as in nearby Madagascar. Endemic species include 21 species of birds and 9 species of reptiles. There are two endemic species of fruit bat – Livingstone's fruit bat (Pteropus livingstonii) and Comoro rousette (Rousettus obliviosus). Pteropus seychellensis comorensis is an endemic subspecies of the Seychelles fruit bat. Other mammals include the mongoose lemur (Eulemur mongoz), which was introduced to the islands from Madagascar by humans.

There are 21 endemic species of birds on the islands. Twelve endemic species are confined to just one island, while the others live on two or more islands. The Comoro olive pigeon (Columba pollenii) and Comoro blue pigeon (Alectroenas sganzini) are found on all the islands. The Anjouan scops owl (Otus capnodes), Anjouan sunbird (Nectarinia comorensis), and Anjouan brush-warbler (Nesillas longicaudata) are confined to Anjouan. The Mayotte drongo (Dicrurus waldenii) is endemic to Mayotte. The Mayotte white-eye (Zosterops mayottensis) was once native to the Seychelles as well as Mayotte, but is now extinct in the Seychelles and lives only on Mayotte. Mount Karthala on Grande Comore has four endemic birds – the Karthala scops owl (Otus pauliani), Grand Comoro flycatcher (Humblotia flavirostris), Grand Comoro drongo (Dicrurus fuscipennis), and Mount Karthala white-eye (Zosterops mouroniensis), found only in high-elevation heaths above 1700 meters. The ecoregion constitutes the Comoro Islands endemic bird area.

There are also a number of endemic butterflies including the swallowtail Papilio aristophontes.

== Threats and conservation ==
The population of the Comoros is currently over 700,000 and as it increases more and more forest is being cleared for farming, with volcanic eruptions and cyclones damaging the forest further, and threatening the fruit bat populations in particular.

24.9% of the ecoregion is in protected areas. Protected areas include Karthala National Park (262.14 km^{2}) on Grand Comore and Mount Ntringui National Park on Anjouan. Both national parks were established in 2010, and protect most of the islands' remaining forests. In 2015 Mohéli National Park was expanded to include about three-quarters of Mohéli's land area, including the remaining forested areas around Mount Mlédjélé. Lake Dziani Boudouni on Mohéli was designated a Ramsar site in 1995, and was later included in the national park. Portions of Karthala and Mount Ntringui national parks are also Ramsar sites.

By 2021 there were 30 protected areas on Mayotte, totaling 55 km^{2} or 13.94% of Mayotte's land area, and 100% of Mayotte's marine area. Protected areas on Mayotte include Pointes et plages de Saziley et Charifou and Ilôt Mbouzi National Nature Reserve.

On 3 May 2021 the French government created the Forests of Mayotte National Nature Reserve (Réserve Naturelle Nationale des Forêts de Mayotte). The reserve consists of 2,801 hectares in 6 mountain forests, covering 51% of Mayotte's reserve forests and 7.5% of Mayotte's total land area. Protected areas include Mount Mtsapéré, Mount Combani, Mount Benara, and Mount Choungui. The purpose of the reserve is to protect the relict primary forests of the island, restore the island's secondary forests, and protect the island's native flora and fauna.

== Visiting the ecoregion ==
Grande Comore, dominated by Mount Karthala, which can be climbed in one or two days, is the largest and most developed island and location of the international airport. Anjouan is reached by boat from Grande Comore, the two features here are Mount Ntringui and Lake Dzialandzé, both Ramsar List sites. Saziley Point is visited from the village of Dapani on Mayotte, there is a birding trail through the forest. Moheli is the smallest and quietest island and the Mohéli National Park, home to sea turtles, dolphins and whales, is located on five offshore islets.
