= Hachiroungou Important Bird Area =

Preserved area in Mayotte

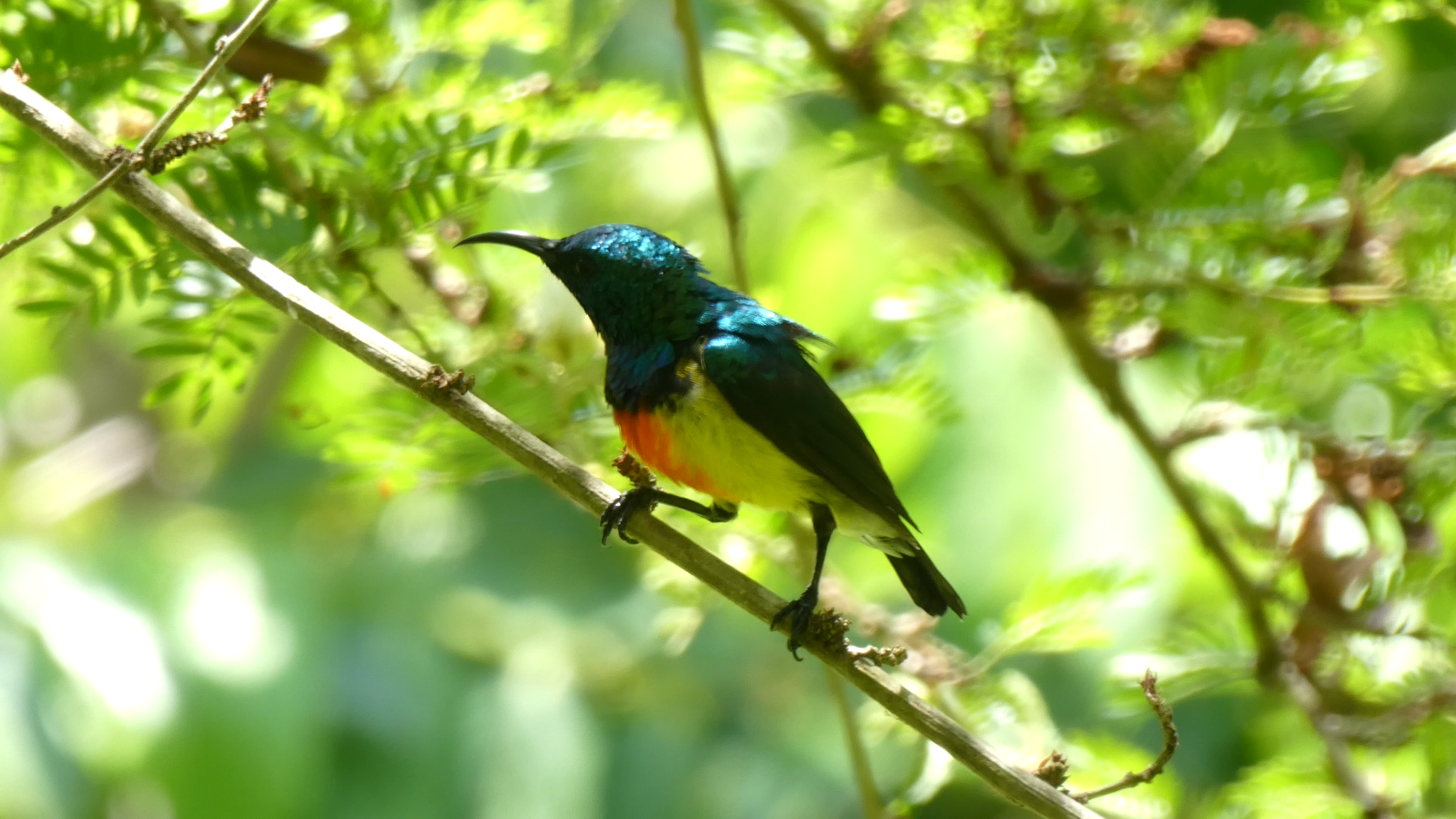
- A Mayotte sunbird, one of the protected species in this area
- Interactive map of Hachiroungou Important Bird Area
- Location: Mayotte
- Nearest city: Dzoumonyé, Mtsamboro and Acoua
- Coordinates: 12°43′00″S 45°04′00″E
- Area: 160 ha (400 acres)

The Hachiroungou Important Bird Area lies in the north-west of the French island territory of Mayotte in the Comoro Islands, lying at the northern end of the Mozambique Channel between the East African country of Mozambique and Madagascar. The nearest towns are Dzoumonyé to the east, and Mtsamboro and Acoua to the west.

== Description ==
The Important Bird Area (IBA) is a 160-hectare (400-acre) tract of land comprising much of the massif dominated by the 496-metre (1,627 ft) Mount Hachiroungou. The slopes of the mountain rise steeply to a triangular summit. From the peak, ridges extend to the north, east and south, forming the Dzoumonyé catchment's watershed. The IBA includes the upper slopes of Hachiroungou, which support mixed montane forest, the southern and eastern ridges, and the Mapouéra valley between them. The partly forested slopes of the valley are steep and dissected with streams. The northern ridge (towards the 472-metre [1,549 ft] peak of Mlima Dziani Bolé) is deforested and excluded from the IBA. The massif is surrounded by cultivation and padza (areas of heavily degraded, largely unvegetated and agriculturally useless laterite soils caused by former overuse of the land).

=== Fauna ===
The IBA was identified as such by BirdLife International because it supports populations of Comoro olive-pigeons, Comoro blue-pigeons, Mayotte drongos, Mayotte white-eyes and Mayotte sunbirds. It is also home to Robert Mertens's day geckos, island day geckos and Pasteur's day geckos.
