= Benara =

- Location within Mayotte

Highest point
- Elevation: 660 m (2,170 ft)
- Prominence: 660 m (2,170 ft)
- Coordinates: 12°52′46″S 45°09′47″E

Geography
- Location: Mayotte

Benara, or Mlima Bénara, is the highest peak of Grande-Terre, Mayotte, an overseas collectivity of France in the western Indian Ocean, with a height of 660 m (2,165 ft).

== Description ==
Benara forms part of the massif that dominates south-central Mayotte. The upper slopes of the mountain rise steeply to a triangular peak. Ridges extend 4 kilometres (2.5 mi) west to the subordinate peaks of Tchaourembo (581 metres [1,906 ft]), Ngouni Maboungani (510 metres [1,670 ft]), and 4 km east to Trambatsini (297 metres [974 ft]). The area down to an elevation of about 200 metres (660 ft), which is typically the upper limit of cultivation on the island, contains what is probably the second largest expanse of forest on Mayotte. It has been identified as an Important Bird Area (IBA) by BirdLife International because it supports populations of Comoro olive-pigeons, Comoro blue-pigeons, Mayotte drongos, Mayotte white-eyes and Mayotte sunbirds. It is also home to Robert Mertens's day geckos, island day geckos and Pasteur's day geckos.
