= Mlima Combani and Mlima Mtsapéré Important Bird Area =

Protected area in Mayotte

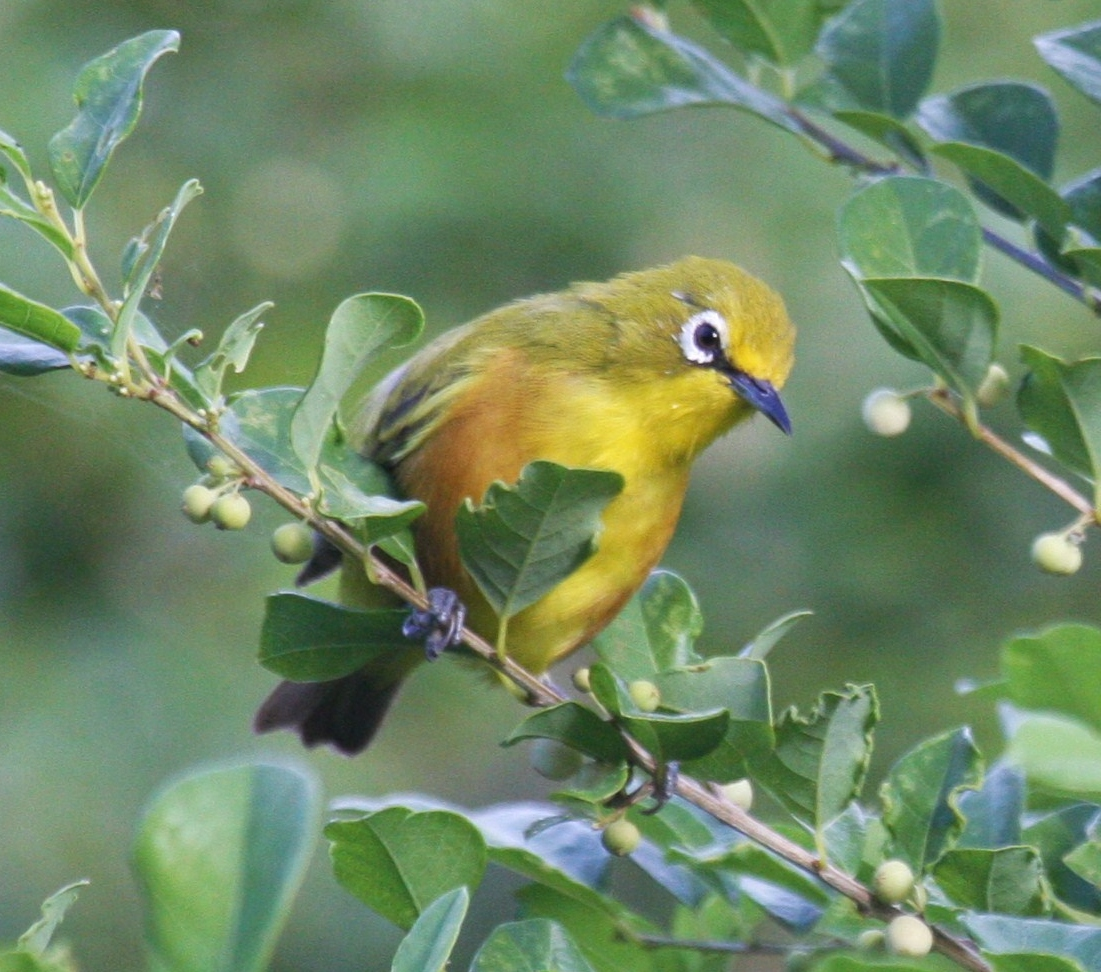
- A Mayotte white-eye, one of species protected
- Interactive map of Mlima Combani and Mlima Mtsapéré Important Bird Area
- Location: Mamoudzou Municipality, Mayotte
- Nearest city: Vahibe
- Coordinates: 12°47′00″S 45°10′00″E

The Mlima Combani and Mlima Mtsapéré Important Bird Area lies in the north-central part of the French island territory of Mayotte in the Comoro Islands, lying at the northern end of the Mozambique Channel between the East African country of Mozambique and Madagascar.

== Description ==
The Important Bird Area (IBA) consists of a forested mountain massif dominated by the peaks of Combani (477 metres [1,565 ft]) and Mtsapéré (572 metres [1,877 ft]). The peaks are connected by a ridge that does not drop below an elevation of 320477 metres [1,565 ft]. The terrain is undulating, with steep slopes around Mtsapéré. The IBA includes most land above 200 metres (660 ft), excluding cultivation around the towns of Combani and Vahibéni. The area contains the largest remaining tract of forest on Mayotte. It was identified as an IBA by BirdLife International because it supports populations of Comoro olive-pigeons, Comoro blue-pigeons, Mayotte white-eyes, Mayotte sunbirds and Mayotte drongos. It is home to Robert Mertens's day geckos, island day geckos and Pasteur's day geckos as well as the butterflies Charaxes saperanus, Culapa mayottensis and Neptis mayottensis.
