= Baie de Bouéni =

Bay in the south-west of the French island territory of Mayotte

- IUCN category IV (habitat/species management area)
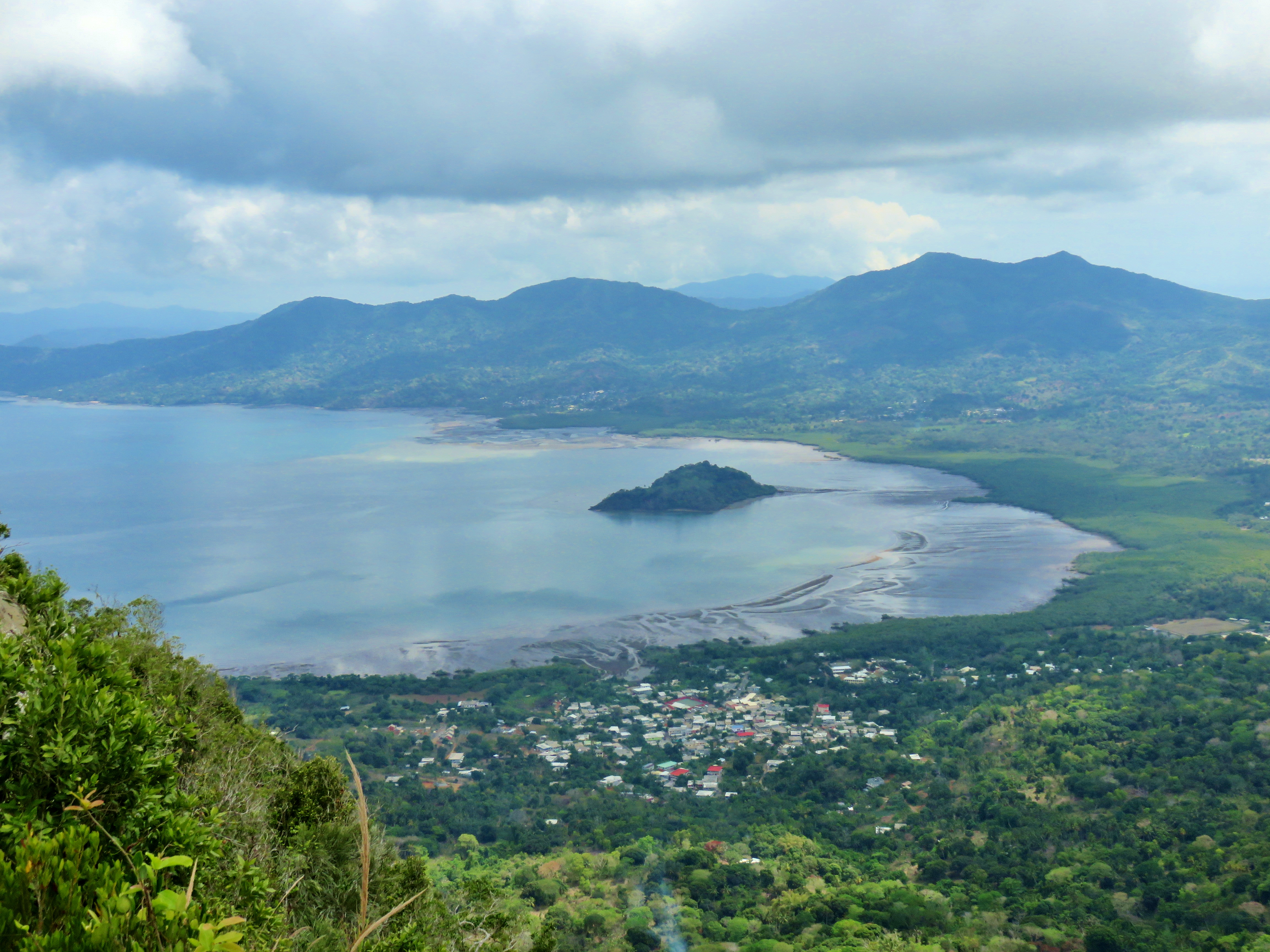
- view of the Baie de Bouéni from Mont Choungui.

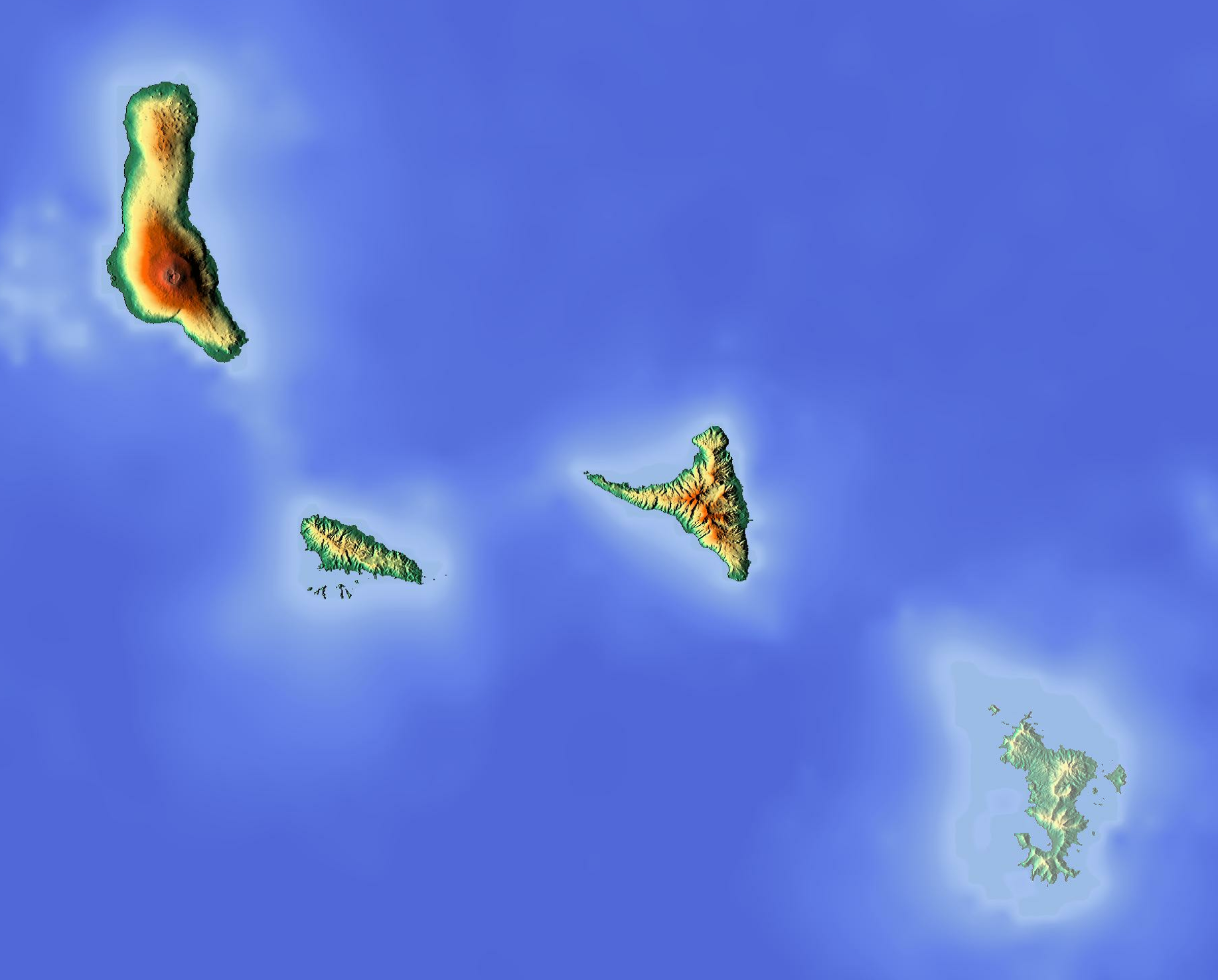
- Location within Comoros
- Location: Chirongui, Grande-Terre, Mayotte
- Coordinates: 12°54′00″S 45°07′00″E
- Area: 519 ha (1,280 acres)
- Designation: Land Acquired By Conservatoire Du Littoral (National Seaside And Lakeside Conservancy)
- Designated: 2007
- Owner: Conservatoire Du Littoral

Map of Mayotte

The Baie de Bouéni is a large bay in the south-west of the French island territory of Mayotte, in the Comoro Islands lying at the northern end of the Mozambique Channel between the East African country of Mozambique and Madagascar. It is about 5 kilometres (3.1 mi) wide at its mouth, and 10 kilometres (6.2 mi) in length. It was made a protected area in 2007.

== Important Bird Area ==
The coastal fringe of the bay holds the largest area of mangroves in the Comoro archipelago. It forms a strip about 13 kilometres (8.1 mi) long and up to 800 metres (2,600 ft) wide. It has been identified as an Important Bird Area (IBA) by BirdLife International because its mangroves and intertidal mudflats support populations of Malagasy pond herons, Mayotte drongos, Mayotte white-eyes, Mayotte sunbirds and red-headed fodies. It is also home to the endangered and endemic Robert Mertens's day gecko.
