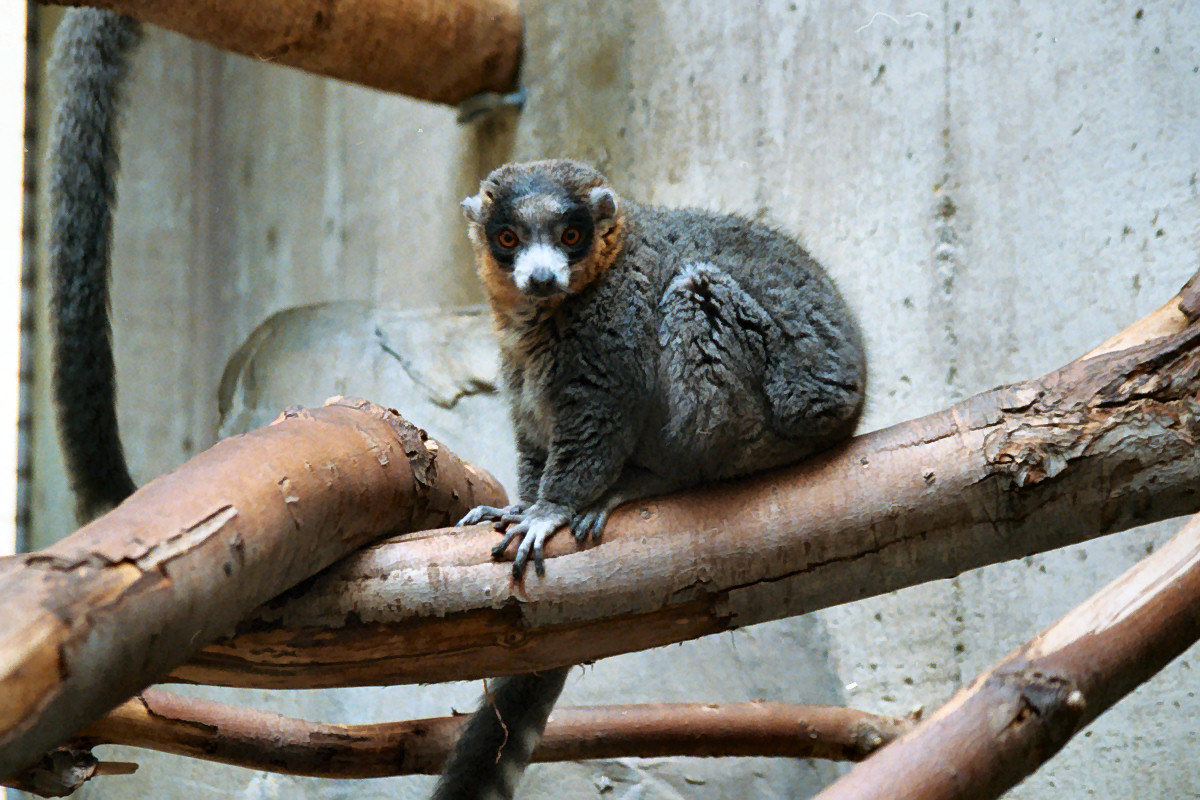
- Mongoose lemur at Cleveland Metroparks Zoo

Conservation status
- Critically Endangered (IUCN 3.1)
- CITES Appendix I

Scientific classification
- Kingdom: Animalia
- Phylum: Chordata
- Class: Mammalia
- Infraclass: Placentalia
- Order: Primates
- Suborder: Strepsirrhini
- Family: Lemuridae
- Genus: Eulemur
- Species: E. mongoz

Binomial name
- Eulemur mongoz (Linnaeus, 1766)
- Distribution of E. mongoz: red = native, green = introduced

Synonyms
- List: Lemur albimanus É. Geoffroy, 1812; Lemur anjuanensis É. Geoffroy, 1812; Lemur cuvieri Fitzinger, 1870; Lemur dubius F. Cuvier, 1834; Lemur johannae Trouessart, 1904; Lemur mongoz Linnaeus, 1758; Lemur nigrifrons É. Geoffroy, 1812; Lemur houssardii Boitard, 1842; Prosimia brissonii Lesson, 1840; Prosimia bugi Lesson, 1840; Prosimia macromongoz Lesson, 1840; Prosimia micromongoz Lesson, 1840; Prosimia ocularis Lesson, 1840

= Mongoose lemur =

Species of lemur

The mongoose lemur (Eulemur mongoz) is a small primate in the family Lemuridae, native to Madagascar and introduced to the Comoros Islands. These arboreal animals have pointed faces, long, bushy tails, dark-brown upper parts, pale bellies, and beards, which are reddish in males and white in females. They live in family groups and feed primarily on fruit, but also eat leaves, flowers, and nectar, with nectar from Ceiba pentandra trees making up a large part of their diet during the dry season. They have declined sharply in numbers because of habitat destruction and hunting, and the International Union for Conservation of Nature has rated their conservation status as "critically endangered".

== Description ==
The mongoose lemur ranges in size from 12 to 18 in (300 to 460 mm) long plus a tail of 16 to 25 in (410 to 640 mm). Both sexes are born with white beards, but become obviously dimorphic around six weeks of age when the males develop red beards and red cheeks. The males also have lighter faces than the females. Males may further distinguish themselves when scent-marking territory, as they occasionally develop a bald patch on top of their heads from rubbing.

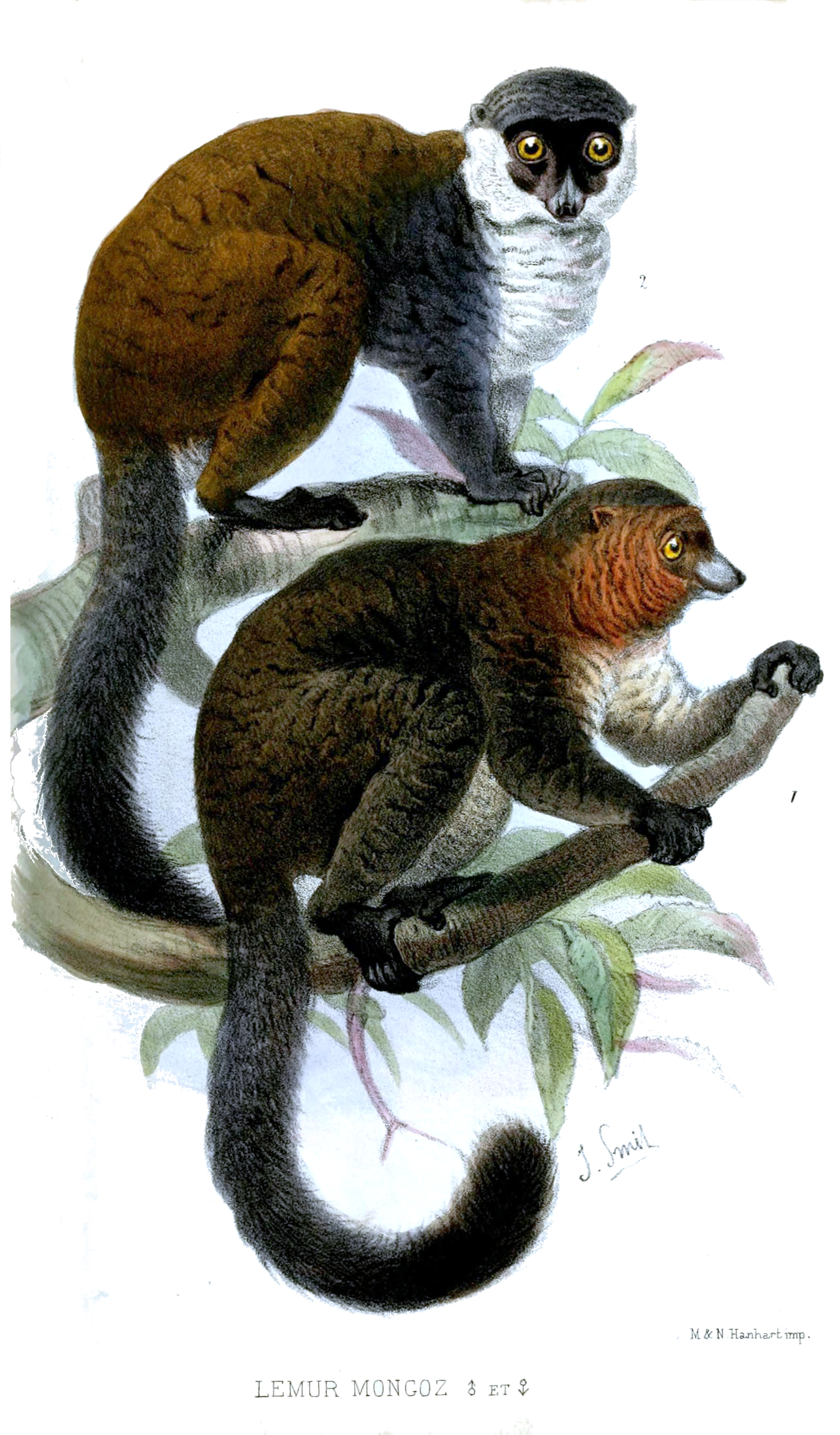
Male below, female above

== Distribution ==
The mongoose lemur lives in dry deciduous forests on the island of Madagascar and in the humid forests on the islands of the Comoros. This makes the mongoose lemur one of only two lemurs found outside of Madagascar, though it is an introduced species in the Comoros.

== Ecology ==
The mongoose lemur mostly eats fruit, though flowers, leaves, and nectar also make up part of its diet; (they may use the nectar of the non-native kapok tree, Ceiba pentandra (Note: C. pentandra, although not native to Madagascar have been used for reforestation on the island.) for nearly eighty percent of their diet during the dry season in some parts of their range). As such, mongoose lemurs act as both pollinators and seed dispersers. Feeding on grubs and beetles has also been observed. They are unusual among primates in that they are diurnal or nocturnal, depending on the season, being more active during the day in the wet season and changing activity to the night during the hotter dry season.

Mongoose lemurs are arboreal, with the ability to jump several meters from one tree to another. They live in small family groups, usually consisting of a bonded pair and one to three offspring. These groups rarely encounter one another, but when they do, they are aggressive. Young are born just prior to the rainy season, from August to October. Gestation lasts about four months and weaning takes place around five months after the young are born. The offspring then usually stay with their parents until three years of age, when they have reached full maturity.

Mongoose lemurs have seasonal habits. Their breeding, eating, and activity habits are largely shaped around the season. Seasonal fluctuations in food resource availability describe the behavior of mongoose lemurs such as female dominance and small group size. Mongoose lemurs usually conceive their offspring some time during October. They present as Nocturnal during the dry season and diurnal during the wet season.

== Status ==
Captive mongoose lemurs can live up to 26 years, while wild specimens live 18–20 years. Mongoose lemurs in the wild are threatened by the destruction and fragmentation of the forests in which they live, and also by hunting. Their numbers have dwindled by about 80% over a period of 25 years, and the International Union for Conservation of Nature has rated their conservation status as "critically endangered". Mongoose lemurs are more endangered in Madagascar, but there could be a way to conserve them in Comoros because of the increase of these species' population in the area.
