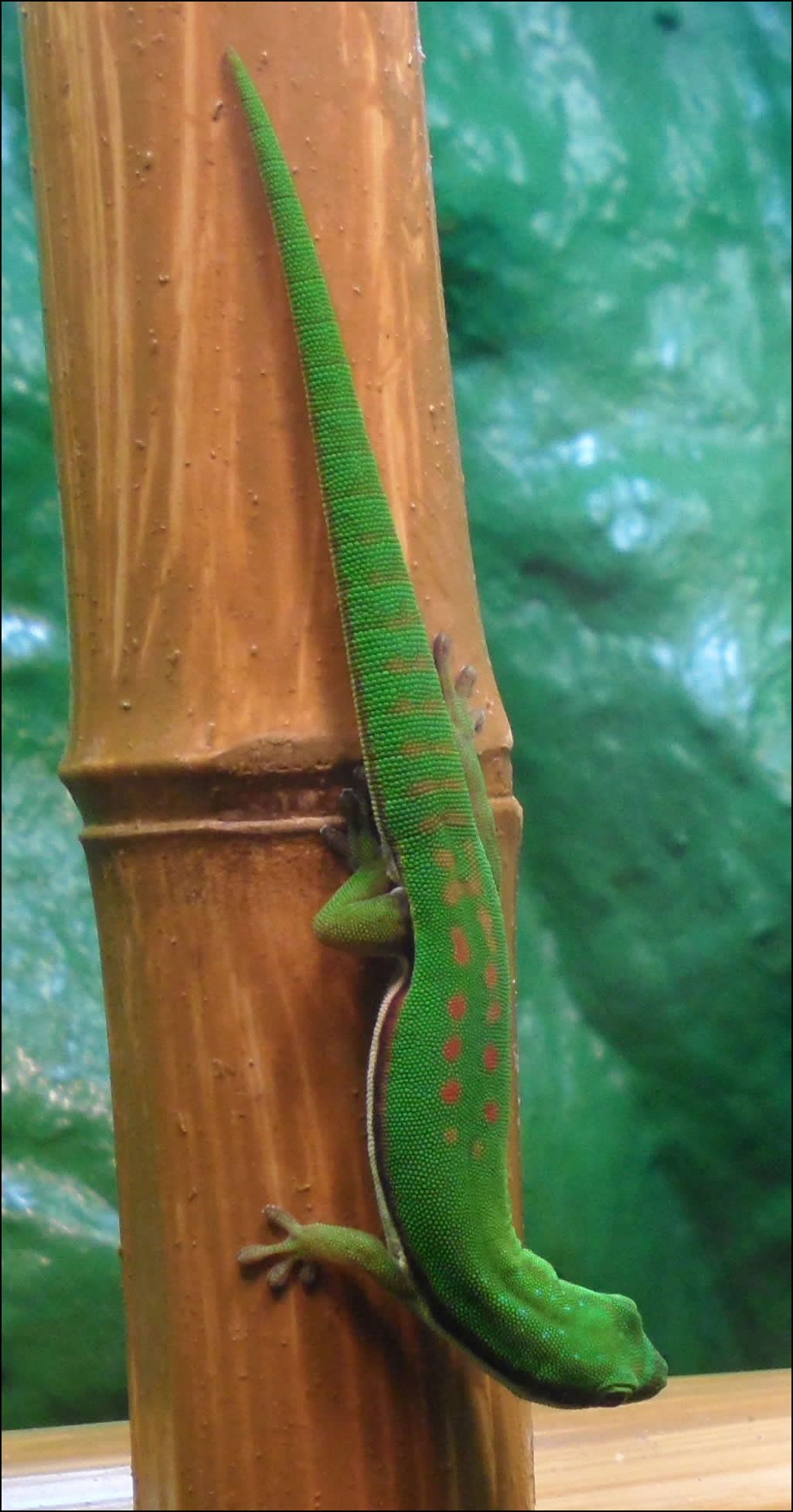

Conservation status
- Vulnerable (IUCN 3.1)

Scientific classification
- Kingdom: Animalia
- Phylum: Chordata
- Class: Reptilia
- Order: Squamata
- Suborder: Gekkota
- Family: Gekkonidae
- Genus: Phelsuma
- Species: P. nigristriata

Binomial name
- Phelsuma nigristriata Meier, 1984
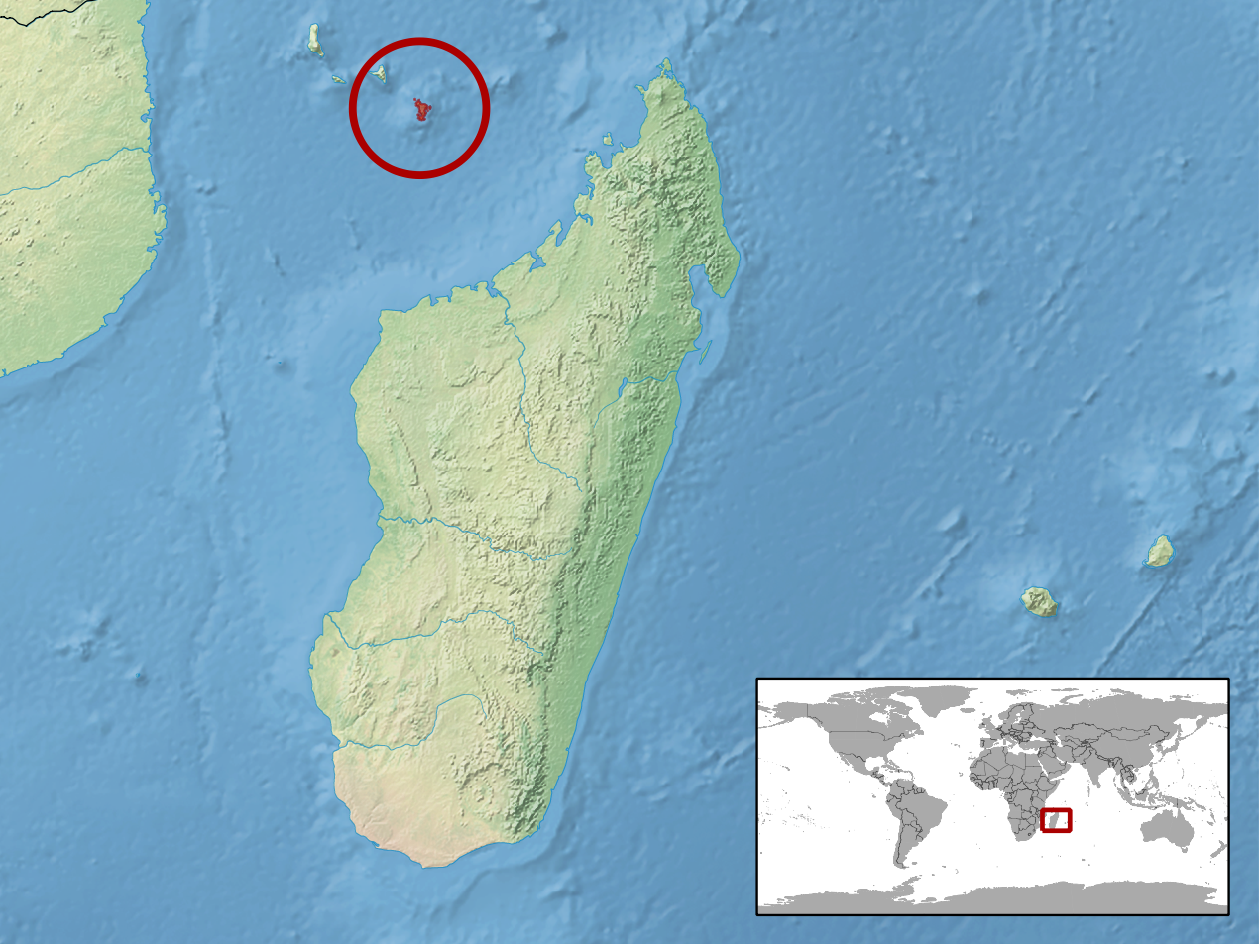

= Phelsuma nigristriata =

Species of lizard

The island day gecko (Phelsuma nigristriata) is a species of gecko.

== Distribution ==
Phelsuma nigristriata is endemic to Mayotte.

== Description ==
It is a diurnal and arboreal gecko that has an elongated appearance. The top is green from the tail to the head. The underside is white. On its mid side, a black line goes up to eye level.

== Etymology ==
The name of this species (nigristriata) means black stripes.

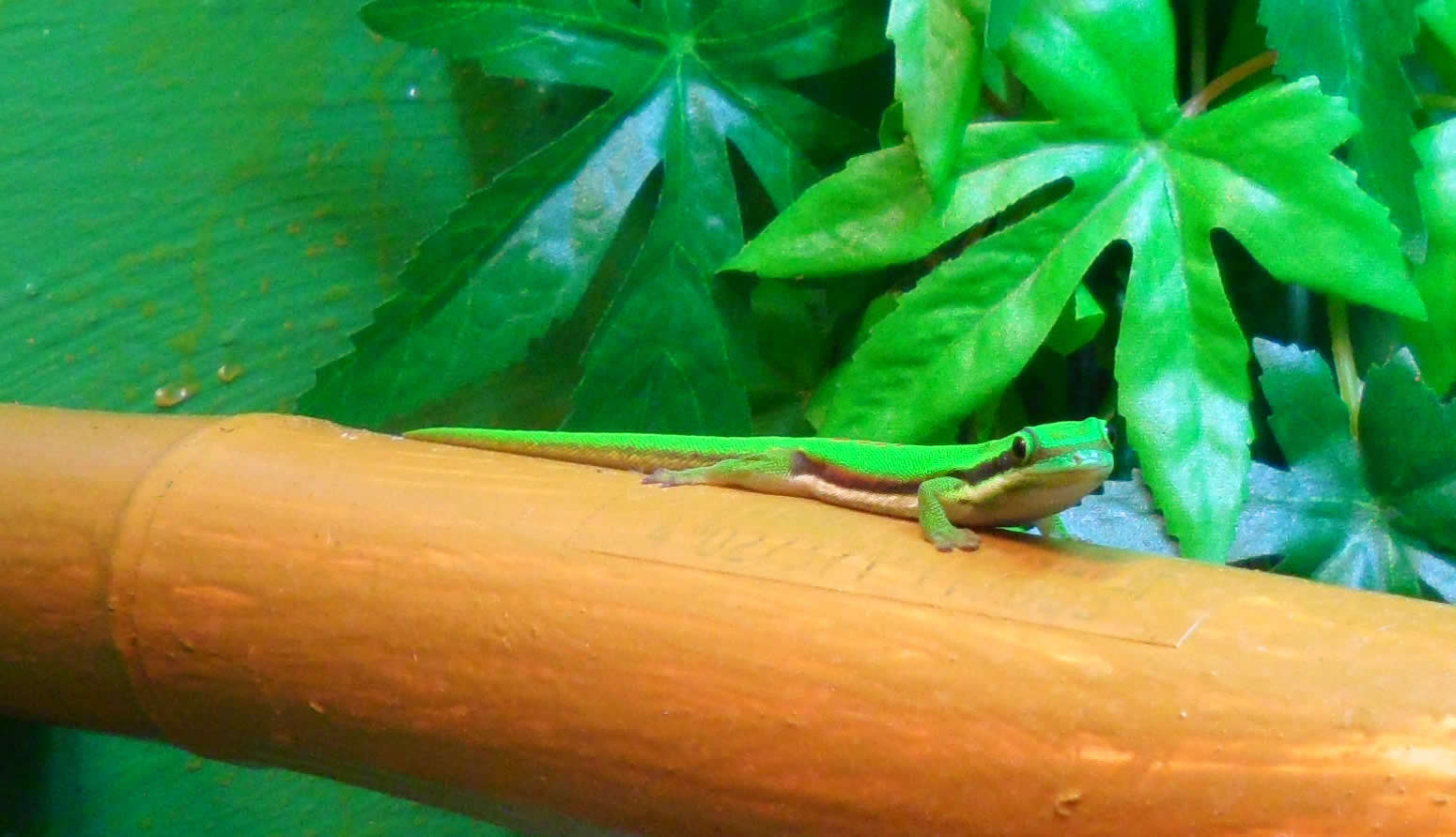
