= Grande-Terre, Mayotte =

Island in Mayotte

Grande-Terre
Native name: Maore, Mahori
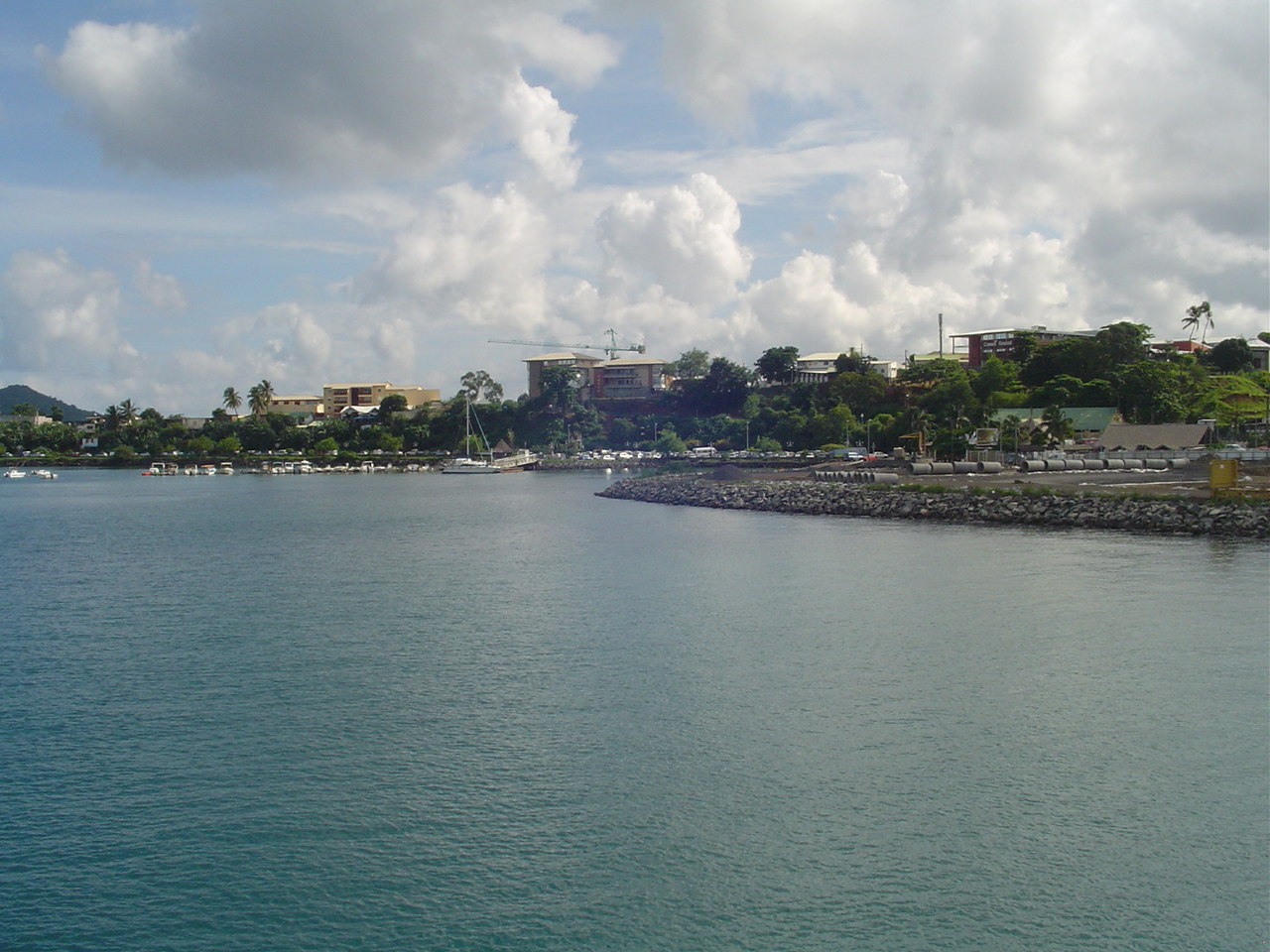
- Grande-Terre

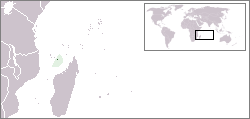

Geography
- Location: Indian Ocean and Mozambique Channel
- Coordinates: 12.831887°S 45.149474°E
- Area: 363 km^{2} (140 sq mi)
- Area rank: ~11th
- Highest elevation: 660 m (2170 ft)
- Highest point: Mount Benara

Administration
- France
- Largest settlement: Mamoudzou (pop. 53,022 (2009))

Demographics
- Population: 186,452 (2010)
- Pop. density: 499/km^{2} (1292/sq mi)
- Ethnic groups: Shimaore, Bushi, Arabs, Swahilis, French

Grande-Terre (French pronunciation: [ɡʁɑ̃d tɛʁ]; Maore or Nyambo Bole in Shimaore) is the main island of the French overseas region of Mayotte. The island is located in the northern Mozambique Channel in the Indian Ocean between northwestern Madagascar and northeastern Mozambique. Spread across an area of 363 km^{2} (140 sq mi), it is part of the Comoros archipelago.

== Geography ==
Grande‑Terre is the main island of the French overseas region of Mayotte. The island is part of the Comoros archipelago located in the northern Mozambique Channel in the Indian Ocean between northwestern Madagascar and northeastern Mozambique. It spans approximately 363 km^{2} (140 sq mi) and features a coastal reef barrier measuring 160 km (99 mi) in length.

The island is underlain by basalt shields formed during Miocene–Pliocene era, and was overlain by later basalt and phonolite domes. Deep valleys were carved by subsequent erosion. The coastline is predominantly steep and cliff-lined, broken by ravines and small bays. Mount Benara is the tallest feature on the island at 660 m (2,170 ft) while there are several other smaller volcanoes. There are several seasonal rivers and streams across the region. Tropical forests exist on mid‑elevation slopes, scrub and mangroves near coasts, and cultivated land along coastal plains.

== Climate ==
Grande‑Terre has a tropical marine climate with a rainy season (November–April) and dry season (May–October). Average temperatures hover around 24 to 30 °C (75 to 86 °F), and rainfall ranges from 1,000 to 2,000 mm (39 to 79 in)/year, increasing with elevation. The island is exposed to tropical cyclones during the November–May wet season, along with landslides, erosion, and occasional seismic activity and submarine volcanism.

== Demographics ==
As of 2010, the island had a population of 186,452 inhabitants.
