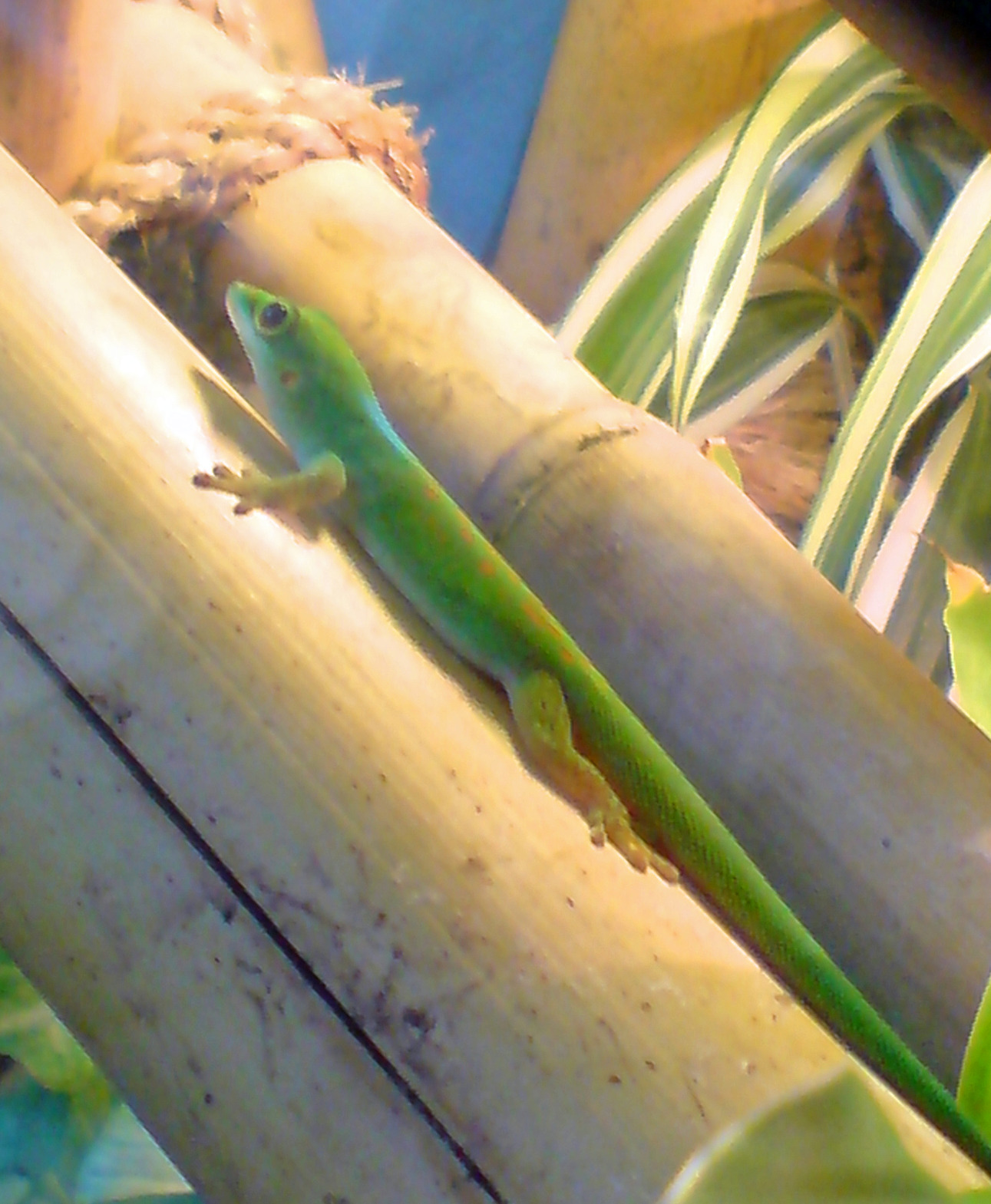

Scientific classification
- Kingdom: Animalia
- Phylum: Chordata
- Class: Reptilia
- Order: Squamata
- Suborder: Gekkota
- Family: Gekkonidae
- Genus: Phelsuma
- Species: P. v-nigra
- Subspecies: P. v. pasteuri

Trinomial name
- Phelsuma v-nigra pasteuri Meier, 1984
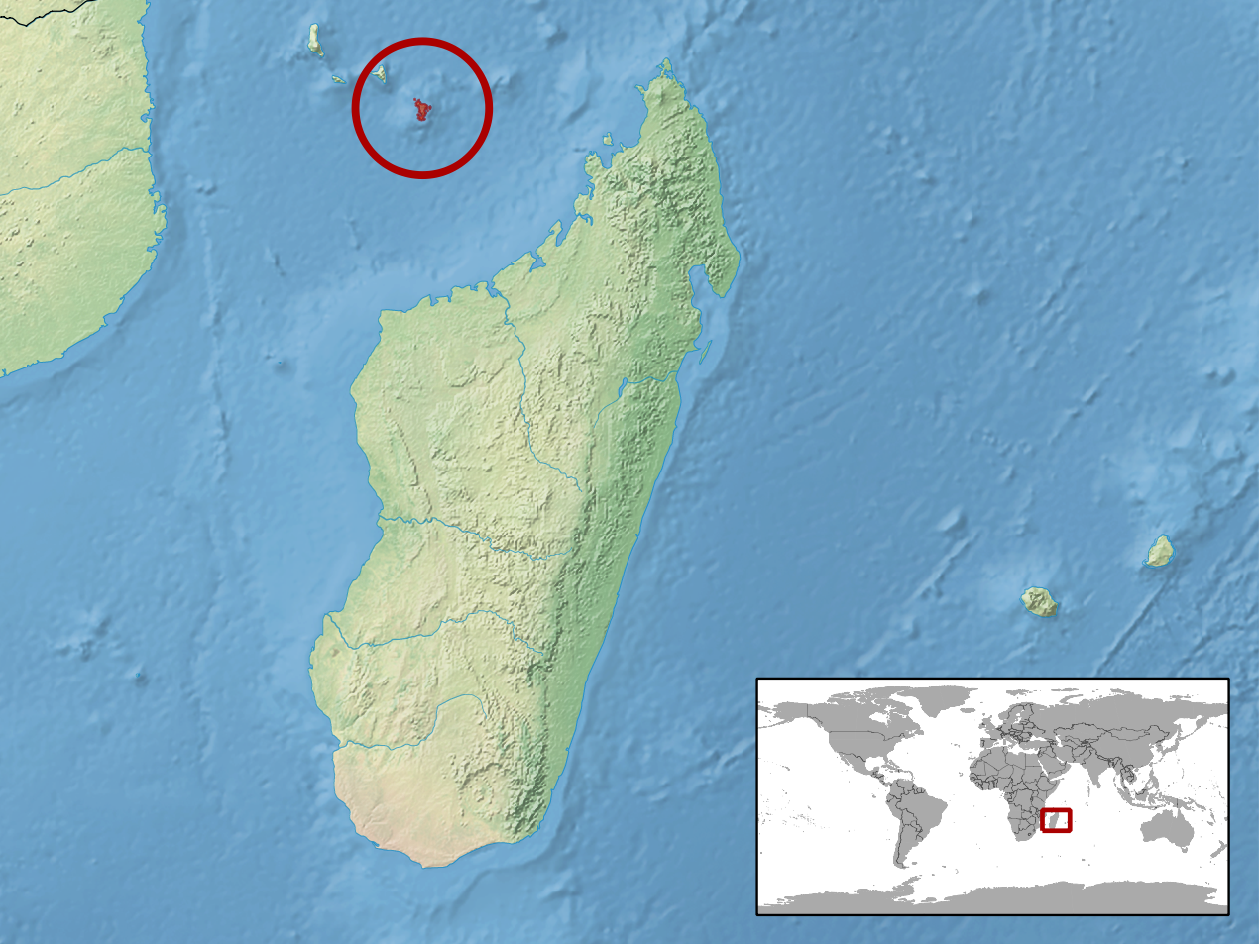
- Area of distribution

Synonyms
- Phelsuma v-nigra pasteuri Meier, 1984; Phelsuma pasteuri — Meirte, 1999; Phelsuma v-nigra pasteuri — Rösler, 2000; Phelsuma pasteuri — Hallmann et al., 2008

= Pasteur's day gecko =

Subspecies of lizard

Pasteur's day gecko (Phelsuma v-nigra pasteuri Meier, 1984; synonym, Phelsuma pasteuri) is a small diurnal subspecies or species of gecko, a lizard in the family Gekkonidae. Pasteur's day gecko lives in the Comoros, where it inhabits trees and bushes, and feeds on insects and nectar.

== Etymology ==
This subspecies (or species) is named pasteuri in honor of French herpetologist Georges Pasteur.

== Description ==
Pasteur's day gecko is one of the smallest day geckos. It can reach a maximum total length (tail included) of approximately 11 cm (4.3 in). The body colour is bright green. The tail may be bright blue. There is a red v-shaped stripe on the snout and a red bar between the eyes. On the back there often are a number of small red-brick coloured dots. Typical is the turquoise blue patch in the neck region, which may be segmented by a small red dorsal stripe. A yellow ring around the eye is present. This subspecies doesn't have the typical v-shaped marking on the throat. Ventrally, it is yellowish.

== Distribution ==
Pasteur's day gecko only inhabits the island Mayotte in the Comoros.

== Habitat ==
Phelsuma v-nigra pasteuri is found on bushes and trees along streams.

== Diet ==
Pasteur's day gecko feeds on various insects and other invertebrates. It also likes to lick soft, sweet fruit, pollen and nectar.

== Care and maintenance in captivity ==
Pasteur's day gecko should be housed in pairs and needs a medium-sized, well planted terrarium. The daytime temperature should be between 28 and 30 °C (82 and 86 °F), and 24 and 26 °C (75 and 79 °F) at night. The humidity should be not too high. A two-month winter cooldown should be included during which temperatures should be 25 °C (77 °F) during daytime and 20 °C (68 °F) at night. In captivity, it can be fed with crickets, wax moth larvae, fruit flies, mealworms and houseflies.
