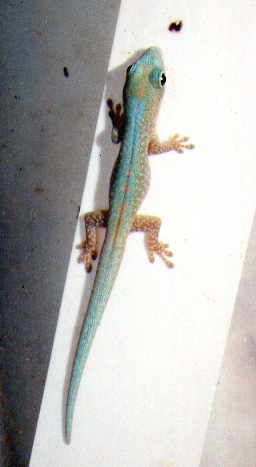
- A juvenile Phelsuma robertmertensi

Conservation status
- Near Threatened (IUCN 3.1)

Scientific classification
- Kingdom: Animalia
- Phylum: Chordata
- Class: Reptilia
- Order: Squamata
- Suborder: Gekkota
- Family: Gekkonidae
- Genus: Phelsuma
- Species: P. robertmertensi

Binomial name
- Phelsuma robertmertensi Meier, 1980
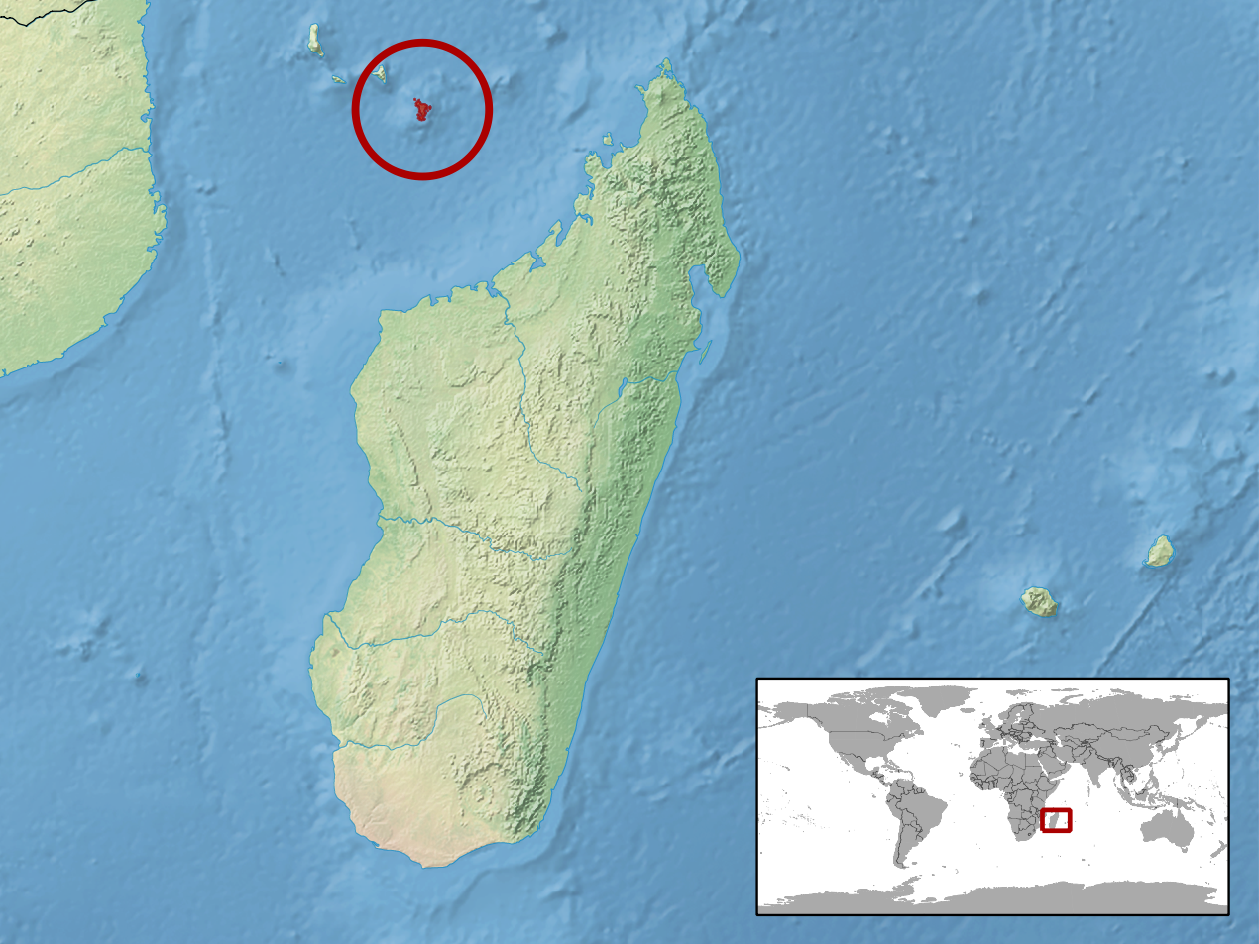

= Robert Mertens's day gecko =

Species of lizard

Robert Mertens's day gecko (Phelsuma robertmertensi) is diurnal species of lizard in the family Gekkonidae. The species is endemic to the Comoros.

== Etymology ==
The specific name, robertmertensi, is in honour of German herpetologist Robert Mertens.

== Description ==
One of the smallest species of its genus, Phelsuma robertmertensi can reach a total length (tail included) of about 11 centimetres (4.3 in). The body colour can be dark green or bluish green. An orange mid dorsal stripe extends from the head to the tail. The sides of the neck as well as the flanks are greyish brown.

== Geographic range ==
Phelsuma robertmertensi inhabits only a small area on the island of Mayotte in the Comoro Islands.

== Habitat ==
The preferred natural habitat of Phelsuma robertmertensi is forest, but it is also often found on banana trees and in abandoned vanilla orchid plantations.

== Diet ==
Phelsuma robertmertensi feeds on various insects and other invertebrates. It also licks soft, sweet fruit, pollen and nectar.

== Reproduction ==
Phelsuma robertmertensi is oviparous. At a temperature of 28 °C (82 °F), the young will hatch after approximately 49–53 days. The juveniles measure 19–22 millimetres (0.75–0.87 in).

== Care and maintenance in captivity ==
Phelsuma robertmertensi should be housed in pairs and needs a well planted terrarium. The temperature should be 25–28 °C (77–82 °F). The humidity should be 75–100%. In captivity, it can be fed crickets, wax moth larvae, fruit flies, mealworms and houseflies.
