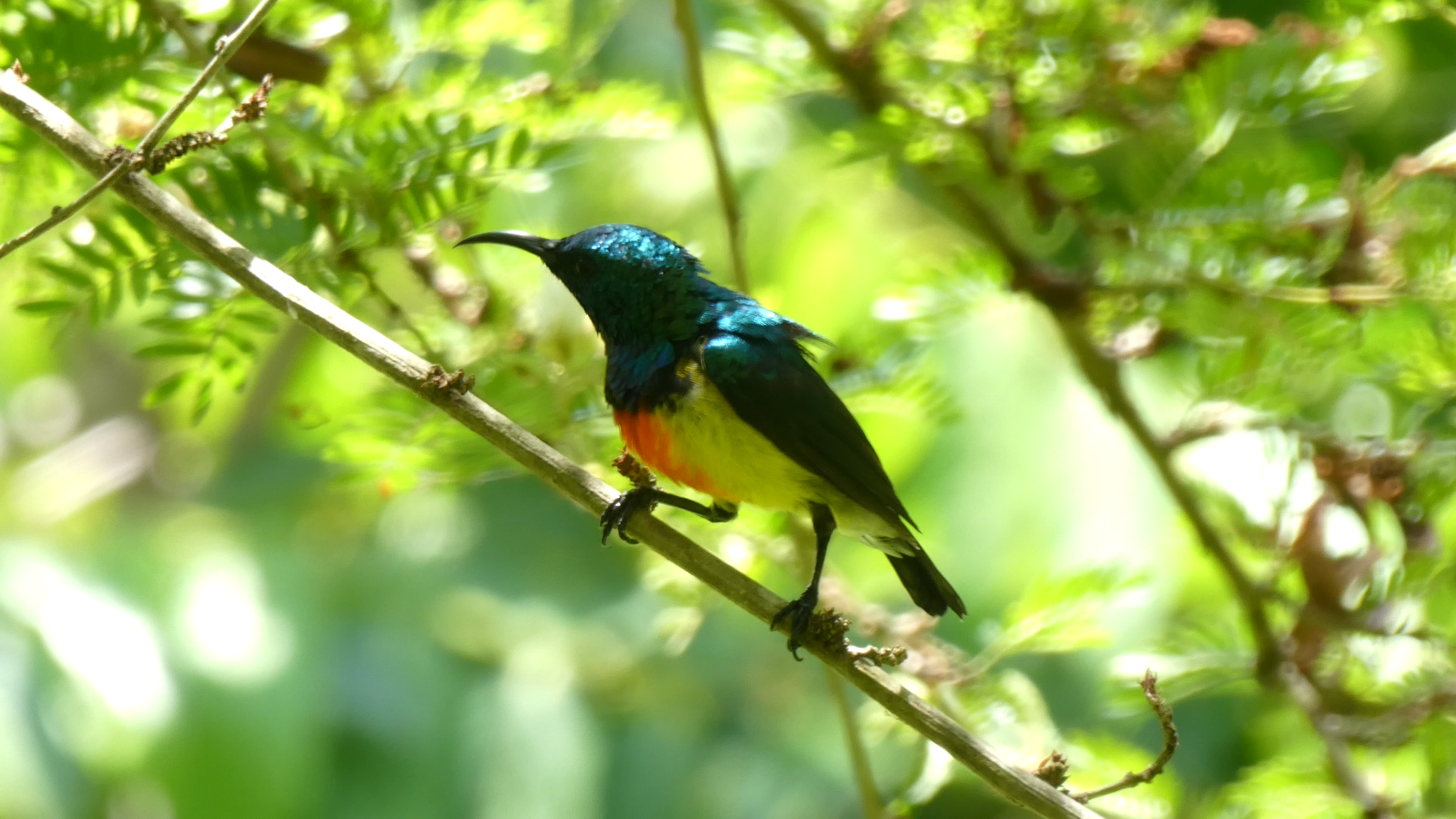

Conservation status
- Least Concern (IUCN 3.1)

Scientific classification
- Kingdom: Animalia
- Phylum: Chordata
- Class: Aves
- Order: Passeriformes
- Family: Nectariniidae
- Genus: Cinnyris
- Species: C. coquerellii

Binomial name
- Cinnyris coquerellii (Hartlaub, 1860)
- Approximate distribution map Year-round

= Mayotte sunbird =

Species of bird

The Mayotte sunbird (Cinnyris coquerellii) is a species of bird in the family Nectariniidae. It is endemic to Mayotte and surrounding islets in the southeastern Comoros. Its natural habitat is subtropical or tropical moist lowland forests.
