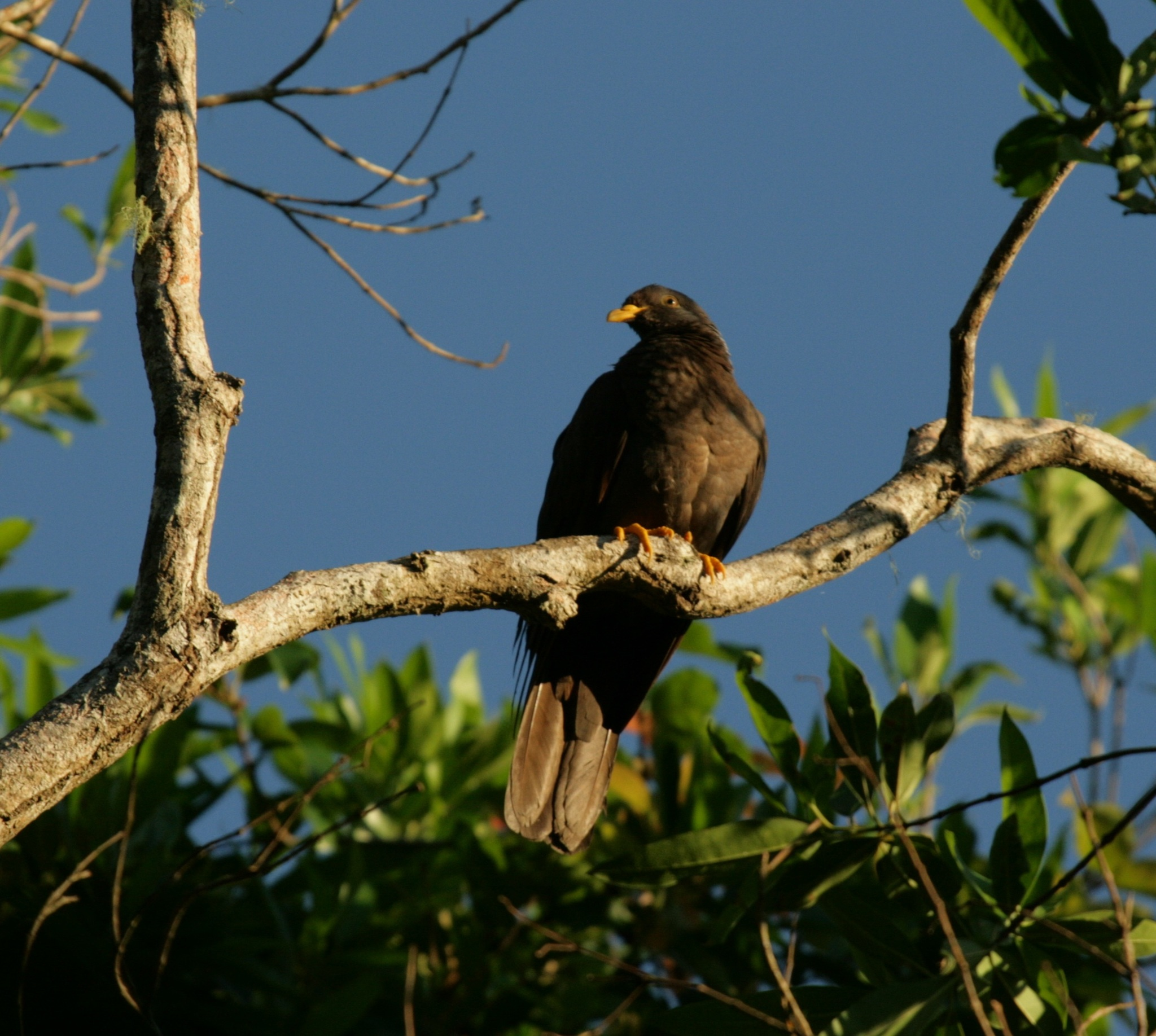

Conservation status
- Near Threatened (IUCN 3.1)

Scientific classification
- Kingdom: Animalia
- Phylum: Chordata
- Class: Aves
- Order: Columbiformes
- Family: Columbidae
- Genus: Columba
- Species: C. pollenii

Binomial name
- Columba pollenii Schlegel, 1865

= Comoro olive pigeon =

Comoros olive pigeon

Species of bird

The Comoro olive pigeon (Columba pollenii), also known as the Comoros Rameron pigeon or simply the Comoro pigeon, is a species of bird in the family Columbidae. It is found in Comoros and Mayotte. It is becoming rare due to habitat loss.

== Description ==
Easily distinguishable from other pigeon species, the Comoros olive pigeon is the largest bird in the Comoro Islands. It has a dark plumage. Adolescent pigeons have a bright yellow bill, whereas older ones have a dull green or brown bill. The Comoros olive pigeon makes a very deep coo of "guk-ohoooo hoo hooo".

== Habitat ==
Its natural habitat is subtropical or tropical moist montane forests and it can be found in Comoros (especially Mount Karthala) and Mayotte, with a higher-density population being observed in the latter.

== Status ==
Although described as locally common in parts of Grand Comoro, the Comoros olive pigeon is in general a fairly scarce bird with a small total population. The chief threat it faces is the clearance of the forest habitat in which it lives, but it is also hunted on each of the four islands on which it is found. The population trend is unknown, but the total population is probably fewer than 10,000 individuals, and the International Union for Conservation of Nature has assessed its conservation status as "near threatened".
