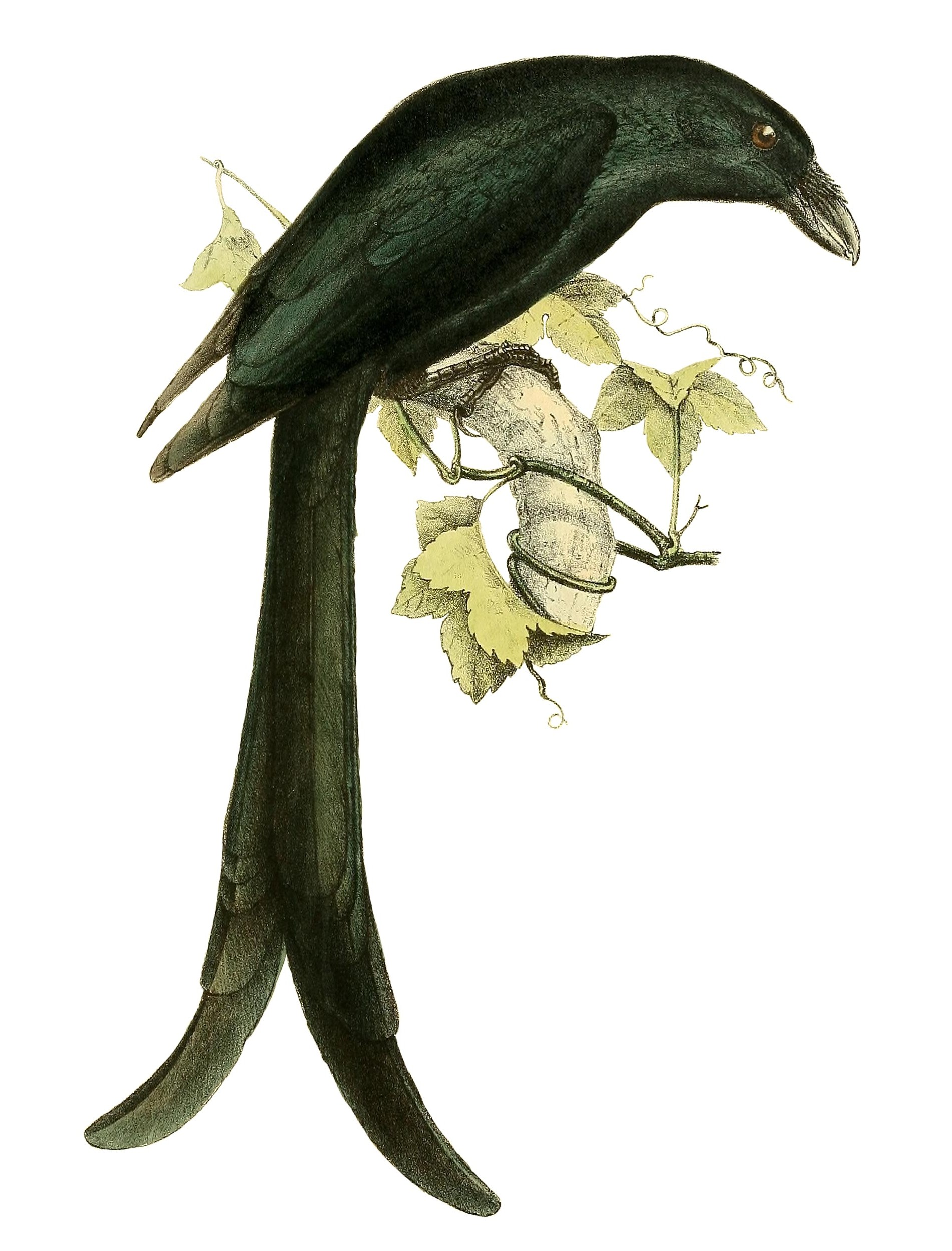

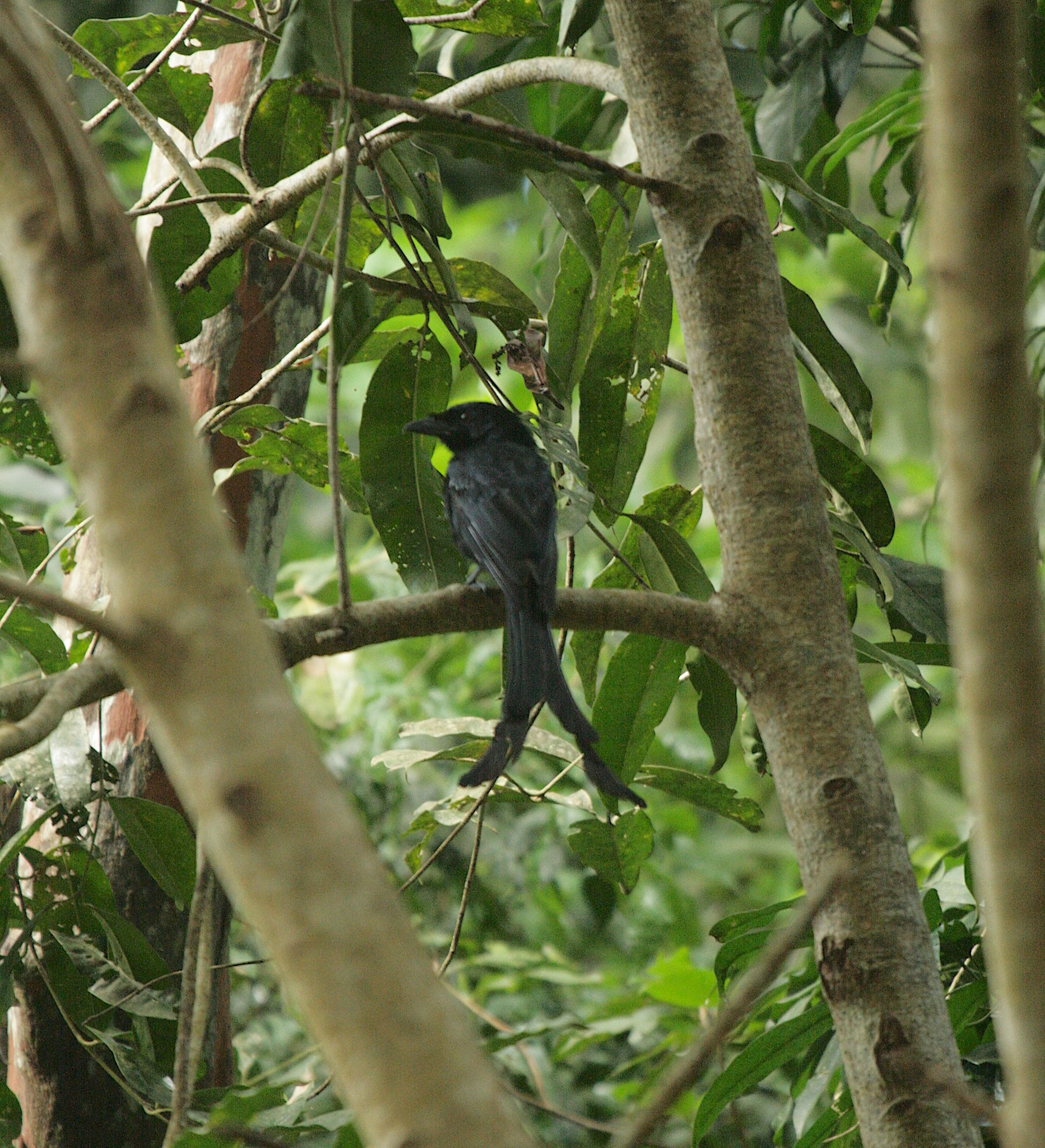

Conservation status
- Vulnerable (IUCN 3.1)

Scientific classification
- Kingdom: Animalia
- Phylum: Chordata
- Class: Aves
- Order: Passeriformes
- Family: Dicruridae
- Genus: Dicrurus
- Species: D. waldenii

Binomial name
- Dicrurus waldenii Schlegel, 1865
- Approximate distribution map Year-round

Synonyms
- Buchanga waldeni Schlegel, H

= Mayotte drongo =

Species of bird

The Mayotte drongo (Dicrurus waldenii) is a species of bird in the family Dicruridae. It is endemic to Mayotte.

The Mayotte drongo is a black bird with red eyes. It feeds on insects, and nests from September to February.

The species is threatened by habitat loss.

== Habitat ==
Its natural habitats are the margins of evergreen forests, secondary forests, thickets, and plantations. It is also present in coastal mangroves and woodlands. The species prefers high altitude habitats.

== Description ==
The Mayotte drongo is a glossy-black bird, with a long forked tail, and red eyes.

== Ecology ==
The drongo feeds on insects, including cicadas. It may also feed on small vertebrates.

== Behaviour ==
The Mayotte drongo perches in the open, and swoops to catch insects in flight. Its song, which is often a duet, is a sequence of whistles, creaks, and rasps.

The Mayotte drongo nests between September and February. It builds cup-shaped nests in a variety of tree species. The female lays one to three eggs, which hatch after nineteen to twenty-one days. Juveniles fledge after around three weeks, and are dependent for around a month after fledging.

== Conservation ==
The Mayotte drongo is threatened by habitat loss, caused by deforestation. The species may also be threatened by introduced predators. The population is estimated at around 5,000 individuals.
