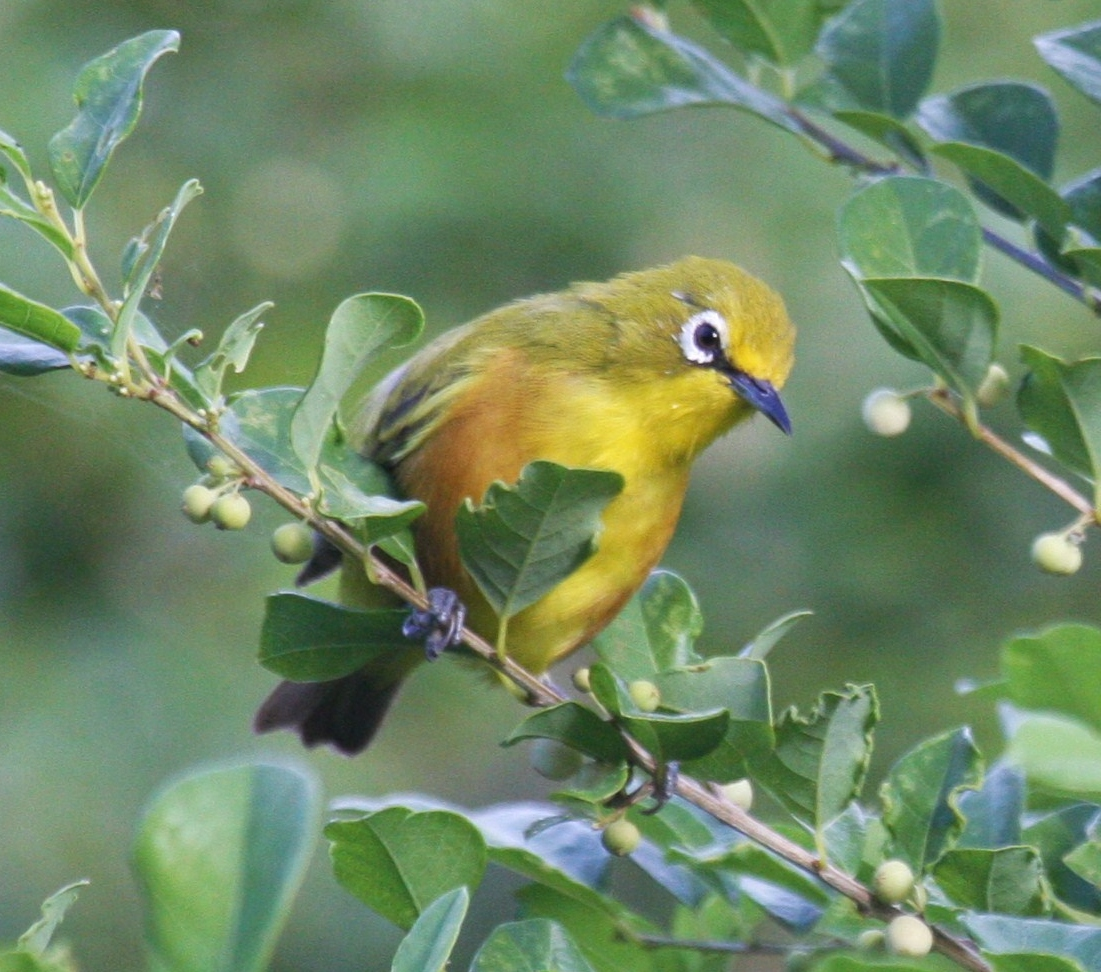

Conservation status
- Least Concern (IUCN 3.1)

Scientific classification
- Kingdom: Animalia
- Phylum: Chordata
- Class: Aves
- Order: Passeriformes
- Family: Zosteropidae
- Genus: Zosterops
- Species: Z. mayottensis

Binomial name
- Zosterops mayottensis Schlegel, 1867
- Approximate distribution map Year-round

= Mayotte white-eye =

Species of bird

The Mayotte white-eye or chestnut-sided white-eye (Zosterops mayottensis) is a species of bird in the family Zosteropidae. It is now found only on Mayotte in the Comoro Islands. Its natural habitats are subtropical or tropical dry forests, subtropical or tropical moist lowland forests, and subtropical or tropical mangrove forests.

The Marianne white-eye formerly considered as subspecies of Mayotte white-eye occurred on Marianne and perhaps other islands in the Seychelles but is now extinct.
