= Ishiobiukwu Gedegwum =

Residence of Orlu monarchs

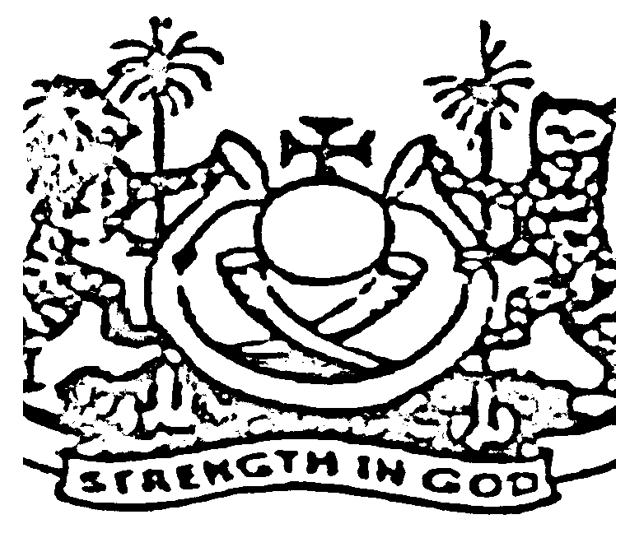
Royal Coat of Arms and Motto

Orlu Ishiobiukwu Gedegwum is the ancient palace and nerve centre of the Orlu people. It is the royal residence and socio-cultural foundation of the traditional monarchy of Orlu, known as the Igwe of Orlu in Nigeria. Located in Orlu town, Orlu LGA, Imo state, the palace is often at the centre of state occasions and royal hospitality. It has always been a focal point for traditional festivals, ceremonies and dispute resolution.

The original pre-colonial features, many of which are still intact, include the Ancient Obi-Hall, the remodelled Mansion of Duruojinnaka (and his forebears), the remodelled Cycene, the Antique Expedition Cannons, the Ekwe-ukwu, the symbolic Iroko trees and the Central Chrysophyllum africanum-tree in Ishiobiukwu of Orlu.

Eze Patrick I, Crown-Prince Pats-Acholonu, Dr. B.C. Douglas Acholonu, Igwe Patrick II, Chief Veronica Acholonu (Adaobi / Princess Royal) and other members of the Royal family oversaw the remodelling of the estate from the 1930s to the 2020s.

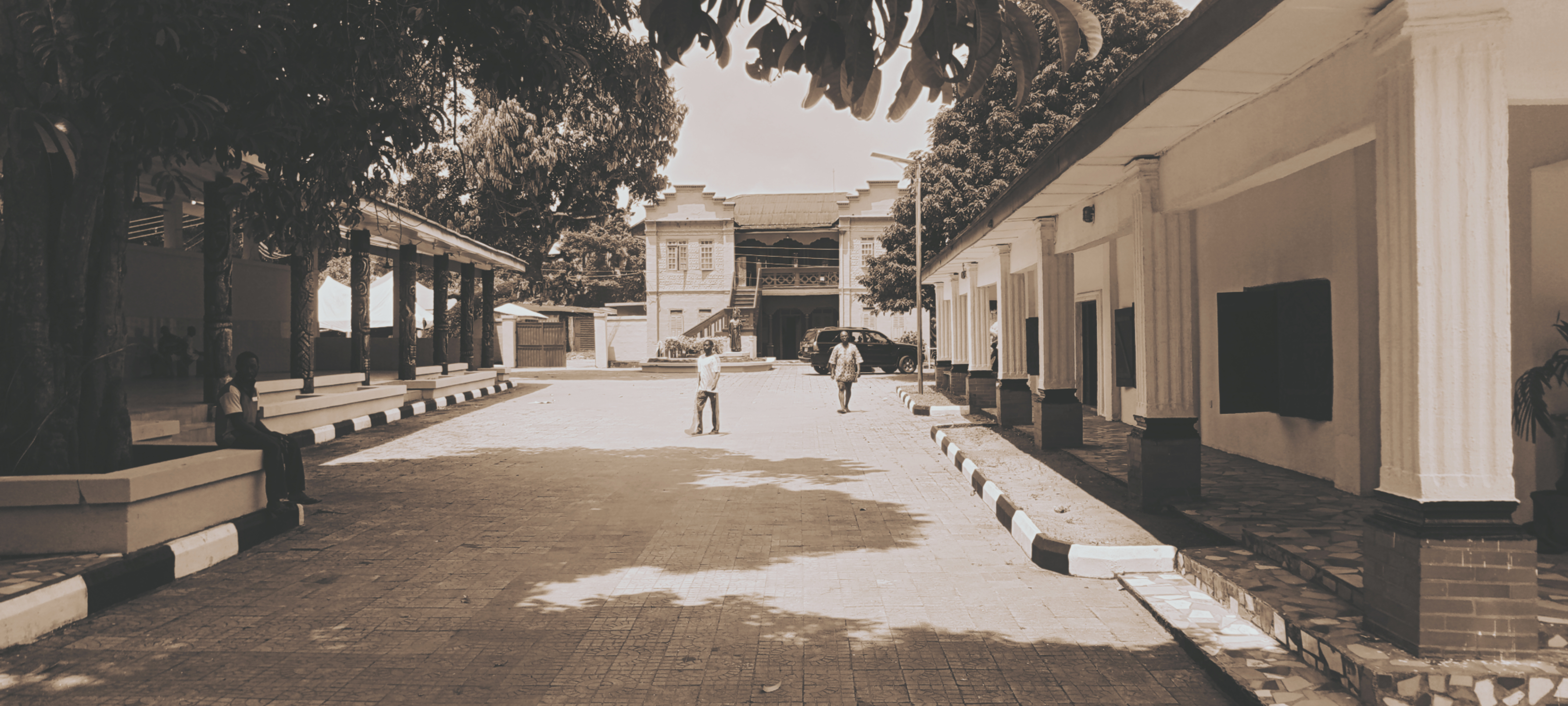
Front view of Ishiobiukwu Gedegwum Palace

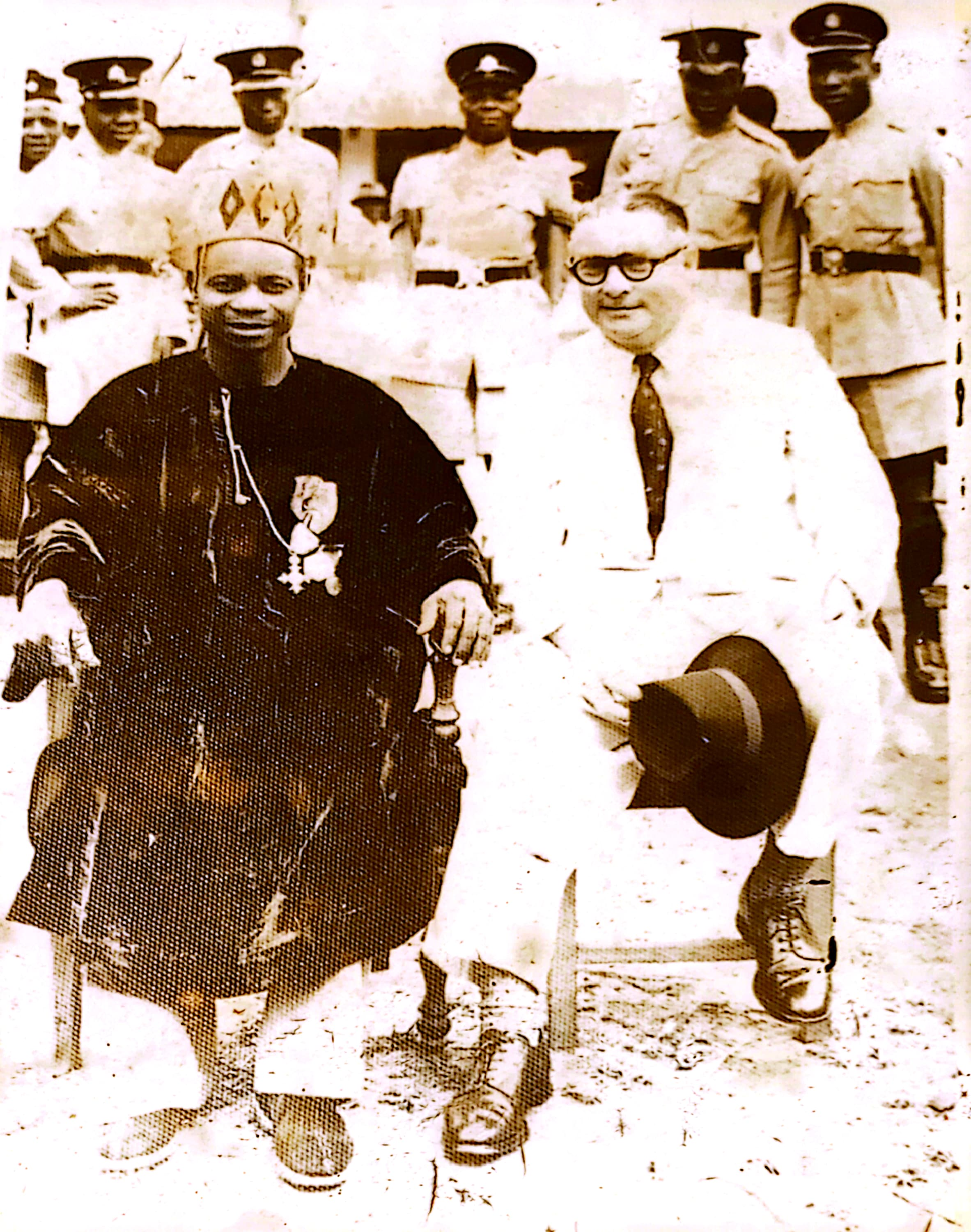
Igwe Patrick-I Ibeakanma Acholonu flanked by district officers at Ishiobiukwu Gedegwum Palace

== Recent Obi custodians ==
The current King of Orlu and custodian of Ishiobiukwu Gedegwum is Eze Dr. Patrick-II Chinedu Acholonu, Igwe XI, Duru IX of Orlu. As the eleventh Igwe (King), he is also the ninth Duru (Noble), the highest Ofor holder, Opara or Okwara (Primus inter pares) and Obi Custodian of the Orlu kingdom. Igwe-XI is the head of "Ogu-Ọzọ" traditional heritage and the Ọzọ institution. He is a humble servant of Orlu town. His siblings are:

- Prince Christopher Acholonu currently in the United States
- Prince Kodizie Acholonu currently in the United Kingdom
- Ada Ugo Patience Effosa nee Acholonu

Acholonu is an old family name that originated from the House of Duru (nobility). They are descendants of the ancient bloodline of Okwara-ugwele or Okwaraigweolu (First-born king of Orlu), who was granted Ọfọ-ukwu of the land.

A great Isu man called Ishiuburu founded the Ozo society in Orlu. He took the title "Okwara Ugwele" or "Okwaraigweolu." Ugwele has been described as the source of Igweolu (Igwe of Orlu), the title borne by the holders of the sceptre of Orlu's royal ancestry.

== Ancient Obi ==
The Obi is a hallowed place. Every Igbo family, kindred (Ụmụ-Ọkala), village, town or kingdom respects the symbolism of the Obi. The Obi, in all its essence, represents the socio-political and spiritual centre of the people's link to their ancestry. At the central level is the Oshiobi-ukwu - the foremost of all the Obi's.

Ishiobiukwu (Ishi-Obi-Ukwu) Gedegwum is the spiritual, symbolic and physical space of the palace, ancestral descent and the inviolable profundity of the everlasting ancient Nobles (Durus) of old Orlu.

The appellation of Gedegwum means, that which was established in the origin, from which other things came forth.

TRANSITION FROM OLD ERA TO COLONIAL ERA:

The 18,00s to 19,00s was a defining period for Orlu-Ishiobiukwu Gedegwum palace. The reign of Duruojinnaka 'the Great' marked the end of the old era and the birth of contemporary times. It was at the twilight of his age that Orlu faced the British Empire. Yet Duruojinnaka firmly declared that his royal title was far beyond the concept of being made a warrant chief—it was a sovereignty far older and greater. So great was his authority that in a report of June 30, 1913, the Acting District Commissioner, Mr. F.H. Ingles, hailed Duruojinnaka as a great chief.

Under Duruojinnaka's leadership, the palace of Ishiobiukwu Gedegwum became famed as a place of refuge. Whoever entered the great Obi was safe from attackers, raiders and assailants. The Pictographic carvings of Duruojinnaka on the doors and windows of Orlu Ishiobiukwu still testify to a leader who turned his palace into a sanctuary of protection, power and honour.

== Ishiobiukwu Ceremonies & Palace Activities ==
- Eze-in-Council meetings
- New Yam Festival (Ịri-ji)
- Ụmụ-Ọkala Assembly
- Masquerade Dance Ceremony at Ama-Ukwu
- Bestowing of Chieftaincy title
- Prayers and Thanksgiving

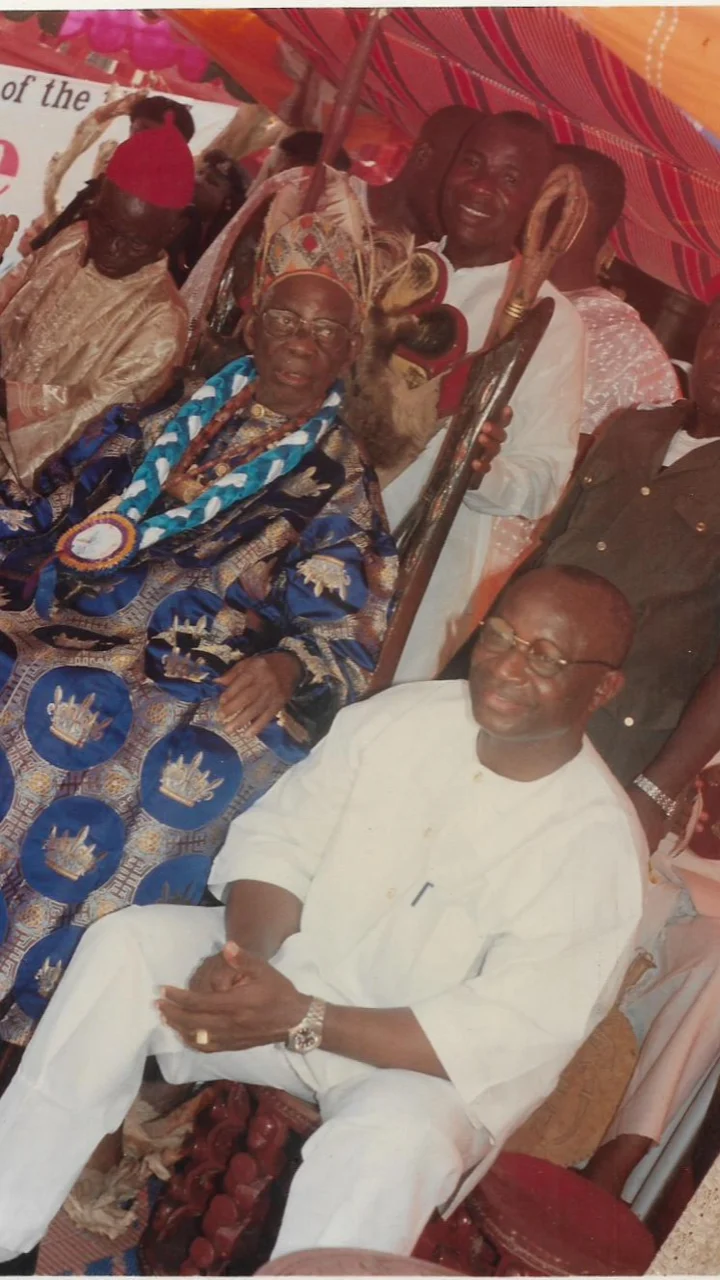
New Yam Festival in the 1990s

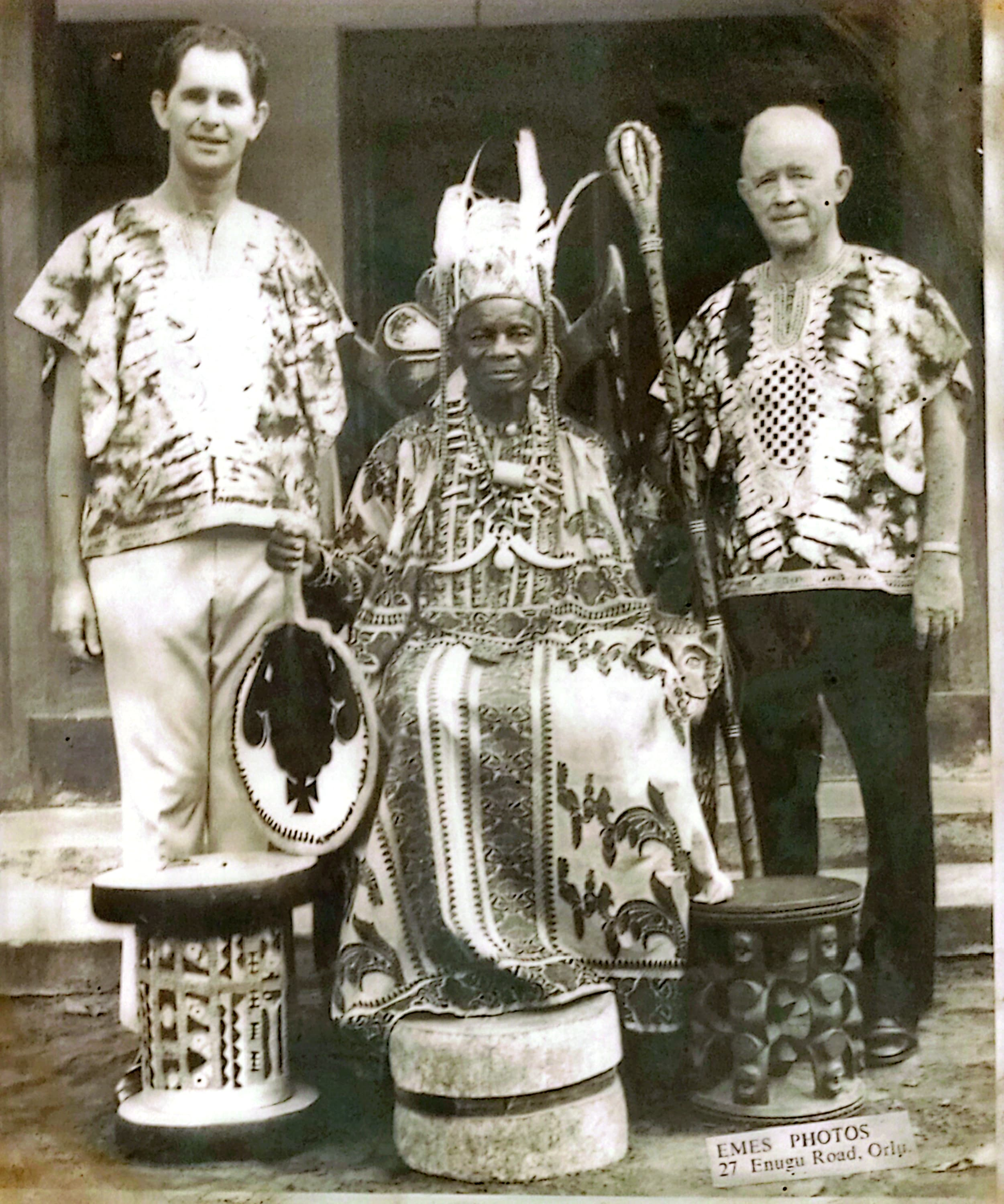
Foreign Missions paying homage to Eze Patrick-I at Ishiobiukwu Palace

== See also ==
- Orlu
- Obi
- Acholonu
- Dynasty
- Non-sovereign African monarchs
- List of Nigerian traditional states
