= Black-and-white ruffed lemur =

Conservation status
- Critically Endangered (IUCN 3.1)
- CITES Appendix I

Scientific classification
- Kingdom: Animalia
- Phylum: Chordata
- Class: Mammalia
- Order: Primates
- Suborder: Strepsirrhini
- Family: Lemuridae
- Genus: Varecia
- Species: V. variegata

Binomial name
- Varecia variegata Kerr, 1792

Subspecies
- V. v. variegata (Kerr, 1792); V. v. editorum (Osman Hill, 1953); V. v. subcincta (A. Smith, 1833)
- Distribution of Varecia variegata

Synonyms
- V. v. variegata: vari Muirhead, 1819; varius I. Geoffroy, 1851

Audio

Species of lemur

The black-and-white ruffed lemur (Varecia variegata) is an endangered species of ruffed lemur, one of two which are endemic to the island of Madagascar. Despite having a larger range than the red ruffed lemur, it has a much smaller population that is spread out, living in lower population densities and reproductively isolated. It also has less coverage and protection in large national parks than the red ruffed lemur. Three subspecies of black-and-white ruffed lemur have been recognized since the red ruffed lemur was elevated to species status in 2001.

Together with the red ruffed lemur, they are the largest extant members of the family Lemuridae, ranging in length from 100 to 120 cm (39 to 47 in) and weighing between 3.1 and 4.1 kg (6.8 and 9.0 lb). They are arboreal, spending most of their time in the high canopy of the seasonal rainforests on the eastern side of the island. They are also diurnal, active exclusively in daylight hours. Quadrupedal locomotion is preferred in the trees and on the ground, and suspensory behavior is seen during feeding. As the most frugivorous of lemurs, the diet consists mainly of fruit, although nectar and flowers are also favored, followed by leaves and some seeds.

The black-and-white ruffed lemur has a complex social structure and is known for its loud, raucous calls. It is unusual in that it exhibits several reproductive traits typically found in small, nocturnal lemurs, such as a short gestation period, large litters and rapid maturation. In captivity, they can live up to 36 years.

== Taxonomy ==
The black-and-white ruffed lemur is one of two species in the genus Varecia, the other being the red ruffed lemur (V. rubra). Three subspecies are recognized: the white-belted black-and-white ruffed lemur (V. v. subcincta), the Hill's ruffed lemur, (V. v. editorum), and the black-and-white ruffed lemur (V. v. variegata, the nominate subspecies).

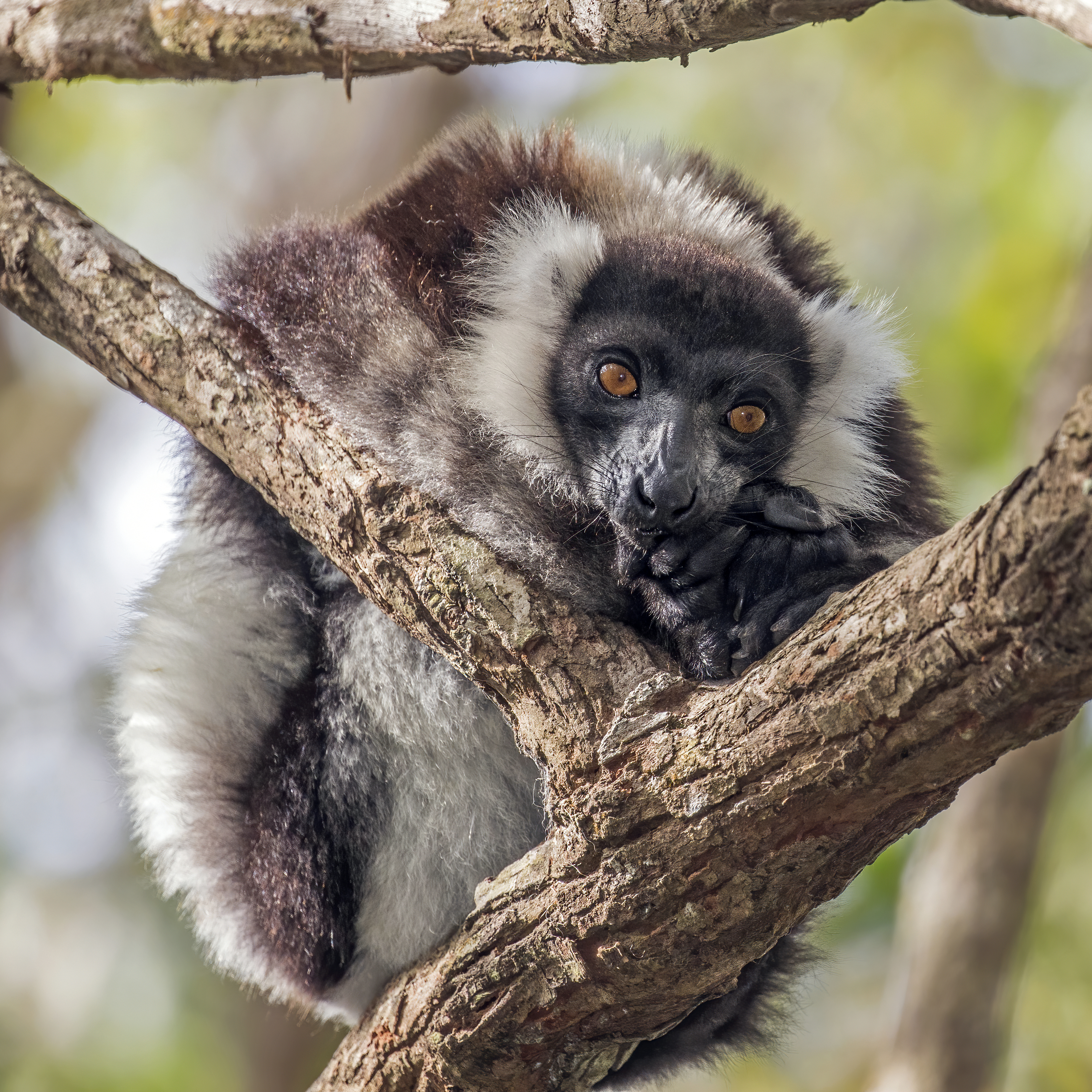
Black and white ruffed lemur
Varecia variegata variegata

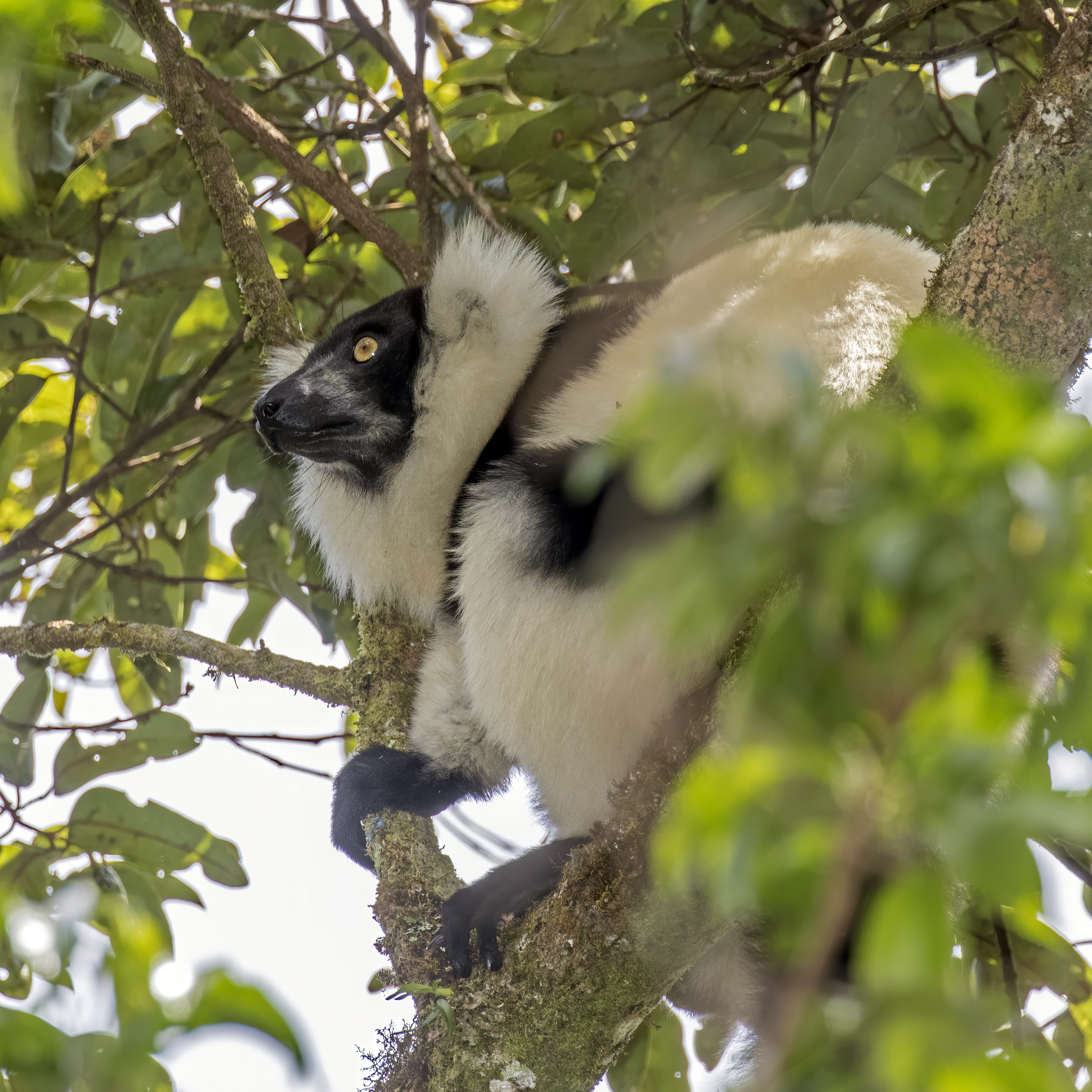
Hill's ruffed lemur male
Varecia variegata editorum

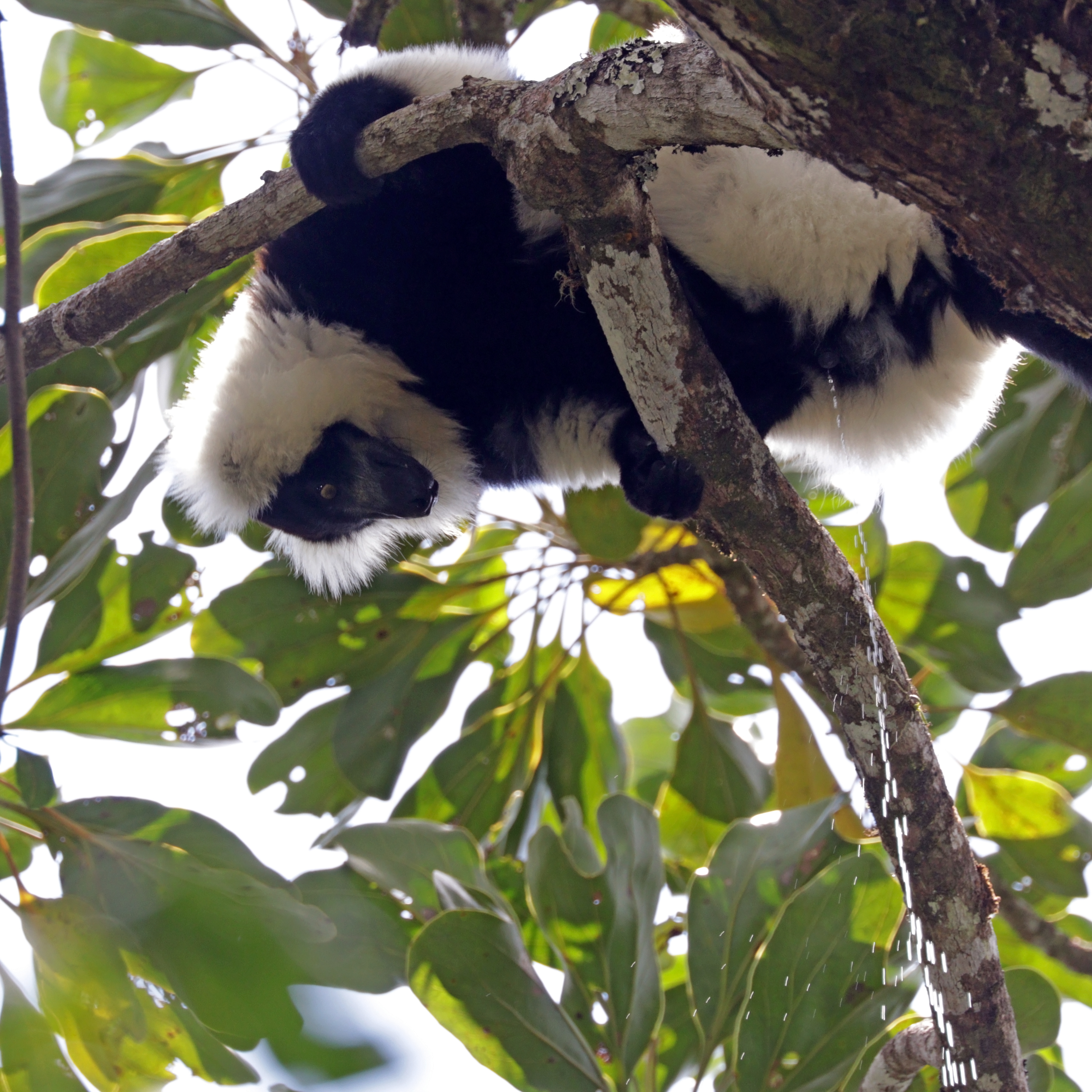
Hill's ruffed lemur male urinating
Varecia variegata editorum

== Description ==
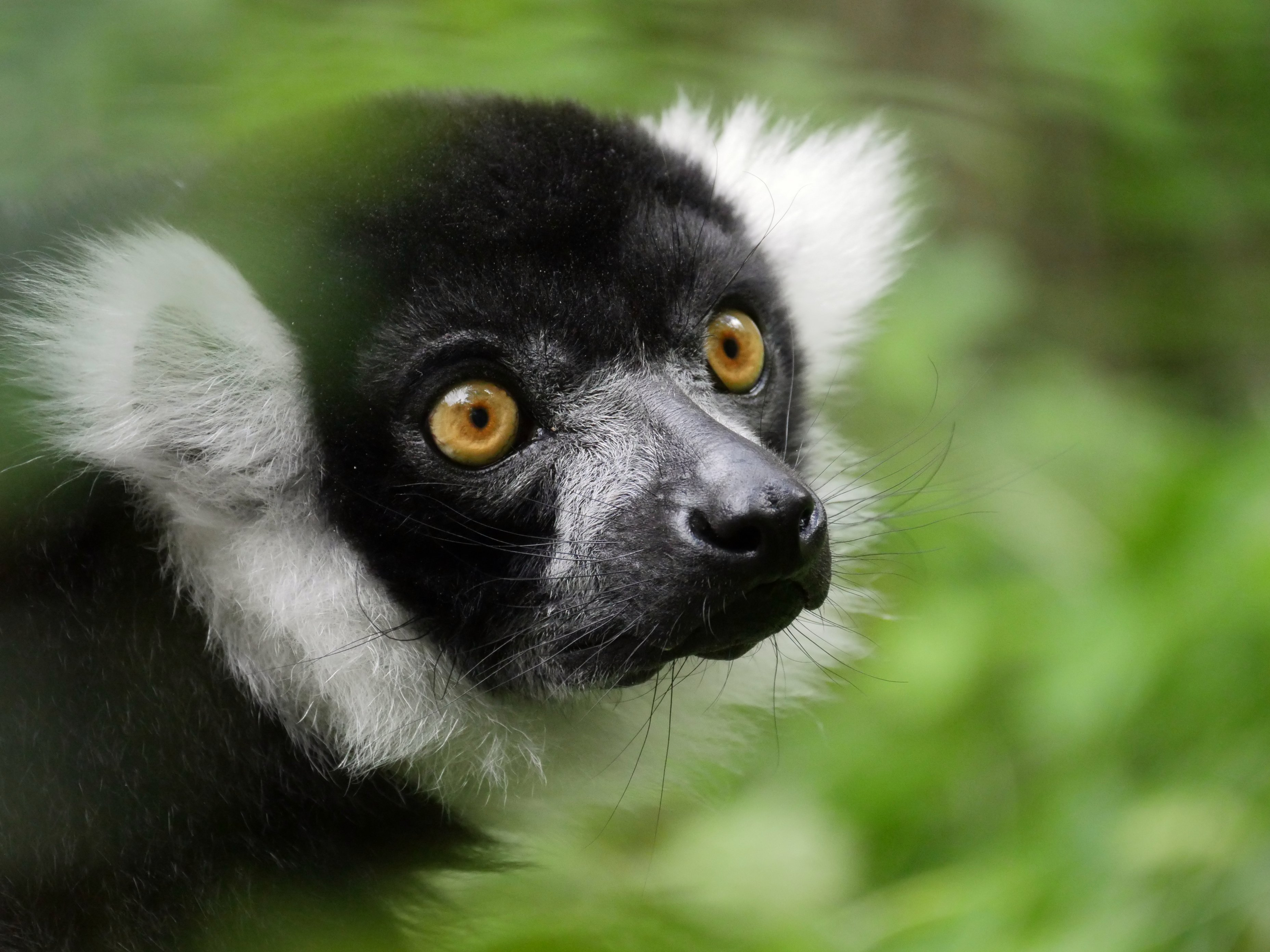
Close-up of head

Together with the red ruffed lemur, the species is the largest extant member of the family Lemuridae, ranging in length from 100 to 120 cm (3.3 to 3.9 ft) and weighing between 3.1 and 4.1 kg (6.8 and 9.0 lb). The black-and-white ruffed lemur is always both black and white; the general color patterns do not usually vary. Abdomen, tail, hands and feet, inner limbs, forehead, face and crown are black. The fur is white on the sides, back, hind limbs and on the hindquarters. Males and females are alike.

== Distribution and habitat ==
The species inhabits the eastern rainforests of Madagascar. It occurs at low to moderate altitudes, in primary forests with tall and mature trees, and by preference deep inside contiguous blocks of vegetation, although patchy forests are made use of if necessary.

The three subspecies have slightly different ranges. The white-belted black-and-white ruffed lemur is found furthest to the north, the southern black-and-white ruffed lemur is found furthest to the south, and the black-and-white ruffed lemur has a geographic range between the other two subspecies.

== Diet ==
Wild black-and-white ruffed lemurs have a highly frugivorous diet, with fruit making up 92% of their overall diet. Smaller percentages of leaves, nectar, seeds, and even fungi make up the remainder. Their diet is also influenced by the seasons, with certain plant parts and fruits only ripening or becoming available during certain times of the year. Water consumption also varies throughout the year and can be influenced by diet. The number of tree species utilized for food by the lemurs can range from 19 to 40 species depending on location. The larger part of fruit items in the diet is provided by four taxa of fruit trees: Ravensara species, Chrysophyllum boivinianum, Protorhus species, and Harungana madagascariensis.

== Behavior ==
=== Female dominance ===
Black-and-white ruffed lemurs demonstrate the rare behavior of female social dominance both within and outside the context of feedings. This is also found in other ruffed lemurs as well as in ring-tailed lemurs and red ruffed lemurs. Aggressive interactions between males and females are usually won by the female even when they do not show aggressive behavior towards the male. Unlike other species of lemurs, black-and-white ruffed lemur females occasionally show submission and more aggression needs to be maintained in order for the female to win the interaction instead of having an undecided interaction. Male aggression does not vary among seasons.

One of the main reasons that black-and-white ruffed lemurs exhibit dominance is for feeding purpose; that is they are able to establish priority over males in feeding. Reproductive females need more access to food because of the costs of carrying and caring for offspring which is why they establish this feeding priority. Energy demands in this species are particularly high. Female dominance in feeding is maintained through demonstrating some aggressive behavior and leading the group to food in order to have first access to the food. Dominance is not thought to be established in younger females so groups lacking a mature female may not have a dominant female. When a dominant female is present, she leads the group to the food source and eats more than the rest of the group.

=== Communication ===
The black-and-white ruffed lemur demonstrates several different call types each of which last several seconds. Most lemurs of a group participate in any one chorus. These lemurs are particularly known for their loud roar/shriek choruses which have several purposes including group movement, spacing among different groups, and alarming other members of the group of predators. Unlike the calls of other species, the calls of the black-and-white ruffed lemur are not likely to be for the establishment of territory for a group. The calling behavior is participated in throughout the course of a day, not concentrated at any one point of the day; however calls are usually not heard at night.

=== Interspecific interactions ===
Black-and-white ruffed lemurs are known to form a natural hybrid zone with the red ruffed lemur. This zone may have once been very large before humans came into contact with the two subspecies. The calls of the two organisms differ in frequency and pulse rate.

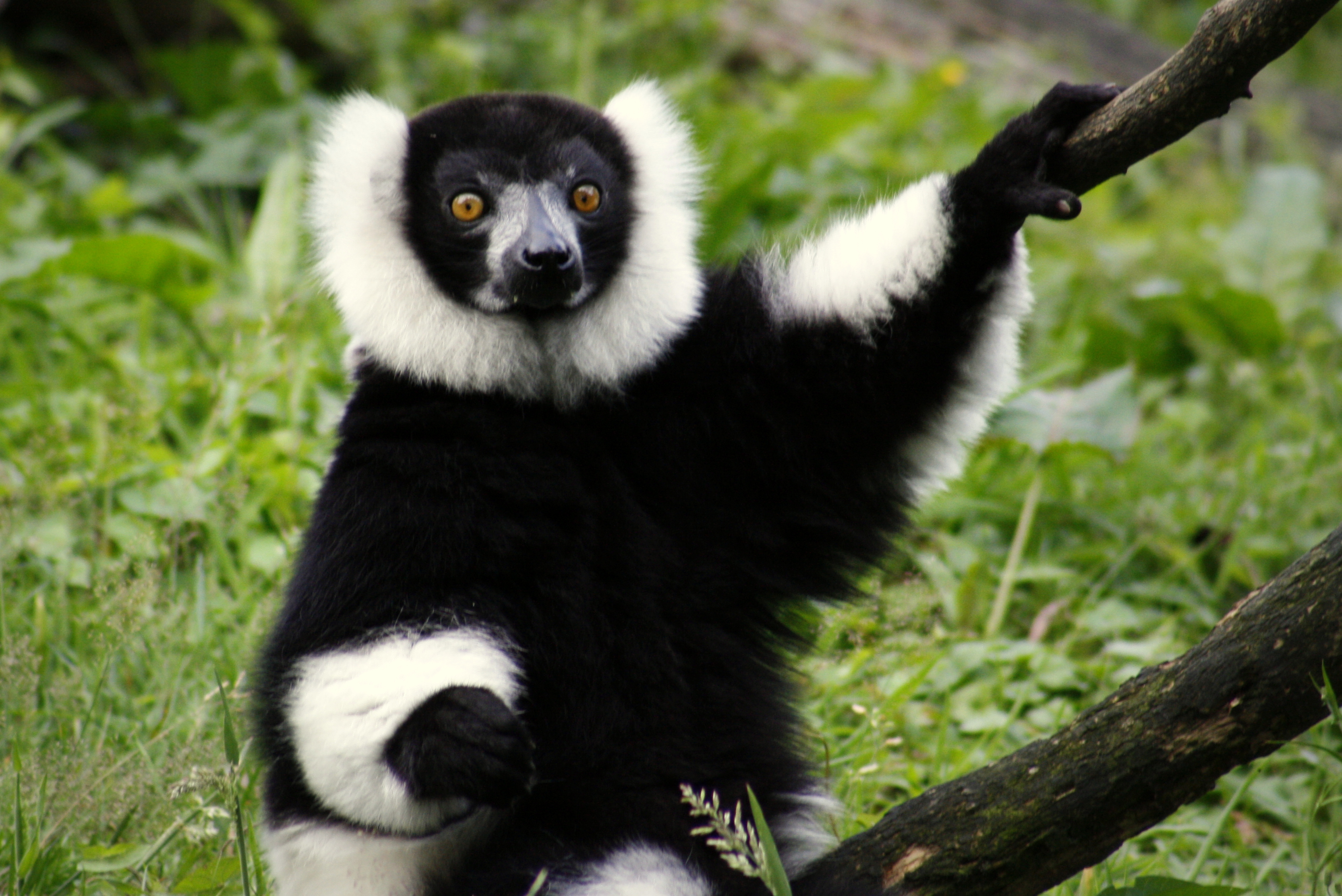
Juvenile

=== Social structure ===
Studies of groups of black-and-white ruffed lemurs both in captivity and in the wild have demonstrated a variety of social structures from pairs to large groups. Groups have been shown to exhibit a range of fission fusion dynamics, meaning that group size can fluctuate based on resource availability. When resources (e.g. food) are plentiful, the environment can support a larger group of lemurs, but when resources are scarce, the group may split into smaller sub-groups to survive. The sub-groups can rejoin and split as needed with environmental and social cues. Parenting in this species of lemurs is unique in that no single infant is invested in but instead, females bear litters of multiple offspring. Males also play a role in the parenting of the offspring especially in smaller groups where the certainty of paternity is high. In larger groups, the chance of a female mating with more than one male increases as does uncertainty in paternity. This tends to decrease the level of male care of offspring. Instead of clinging to the mother, offspring are placed into a nest which is guarded by both parents, described in detail below.

=== Reproduction ===
Both males and females reach sexual maturity between the ages of 1.5 and 3 years, although breeding is not necessarily successful during the first year of maturity. Males exhibit testicular enlargement as they mature, which gradually increases over the months leading to their breeding window. After successfully breeding with a female, the male's testicles gradually reduce to normal. When females become sexually mature and enter estrus during the breeding season, their vaginas begin to open slightly, starting with a small pink dot and line, which is easily visible because the skin around the vulva is black. The pink area gradually opens over the course of several days. Once fully opened, vaginal estrus lasts 2–3 days. During this time, there is an even smaller window of time (6–12 hours) when the female is in behavioral estrus, and breeding is only possible during this period. After breeding, the female's vulva gradually closes and remains black and closed for the remainder of the year. Gestation lasts an average of 102.5 days and typically results in a litter of 2–6 offspring that are unable to cling to their mother, as in other primates. The female builds a nest where infants remain until they can leave it on their own. For the first two weeks after birth, the female stays with the infants nearly 24 hours a day. Both males and females will guard the nest. There is evidence that related as well as unrelated females will deposit their infants in communal nests and share in parental care while other individuals forage, resulting in increased infant survival compared to single-nesting females.

== Conservation ==
All three subspecies of the black-and-white ruffed lemur are classified as Critically Endangered by the IUCN. The numbers of black-and-white ruffed lemurs are on a steep downward trend, dropping 80% in the 21 years before 2020, the equivalent to three generations. The Vasey studies in 2003 indicated that Nosy Mangabe is the most densely populated area of black and white ruffed lemurs. It had around 29–43 individuals/km^{2}. Next in decreasing order came Anatanamatazo with 10–15 individuals/km^{2}, and then Manomba with.4-2.5 individuals/km^{2}.

=== Threats in the wild ===
While predators may be a large threat to the black and white ruffed lemur, the principal threat to their survival comes from the human inhabitants of the island. Since they are comparatively large to other species of lemurs they are hunted as bushmeat by poachers and village men who are looking to feed their families. Another threat to the lemurs is the agricultural practices of the local community. The slash-and-burn method of agriculture is very devastating to the natural habitat of the black and white ruffed lemur.

The black-and-white ruffed lemur is preyed upon by the Henst's goshawk (Accipiter henstii), fossa (Cryptoprocta ferox), ring-tailed mongoose (Galidia elegans) and brown-tailed mongoose (Salanoia concolor). Nesting behavior poses the greatest risks for predation, especially mammalian predators.

=== Reintroduction ===
Black-and-white ruffed lemurs were part of a reintroduction program from 1997 to 2001, organized by the Madagascar Fauna Group and the Duke University Primate Center (now Duke Lemur Center). A total of 13 individuals that were born in human care in the United States were released at the Betampona Reserve, which is in their native range in the rainforests of eastern Madagascar. Prior to being released, individuals were selected by the ruffed lemur Species Survival Plan based on genetic information, health status, life history, and behavioral traits.

All of the individuals underwent a "boot camp" program prior to release that gave the lemurs experience in a free-range naturally wooded environment. During this time, the lemurs were able to improve their physical abilities in a forest canopy as well as forage for naturally growing food. The lemurs were released in 3 groups, each consisting of a family group or pairing, to mimic their natural grouping patterns.

Once released into the wild, the animals each had radio transmitting collars, to aid in the research and monitoring possibilities post-release. The lemurs were provided with some supplementary food and their health and behavior was monitored. At least 5 of the released individuals were killed by fossa, a native predator of lemurs, including a breeding pair that had previously raised triplets. Of the surviving lemurs, at least 1 male successfully merged with an existing wild group and reproduced. Future reintroduction efforts are halted due to habitat degradation and fragmentation.
