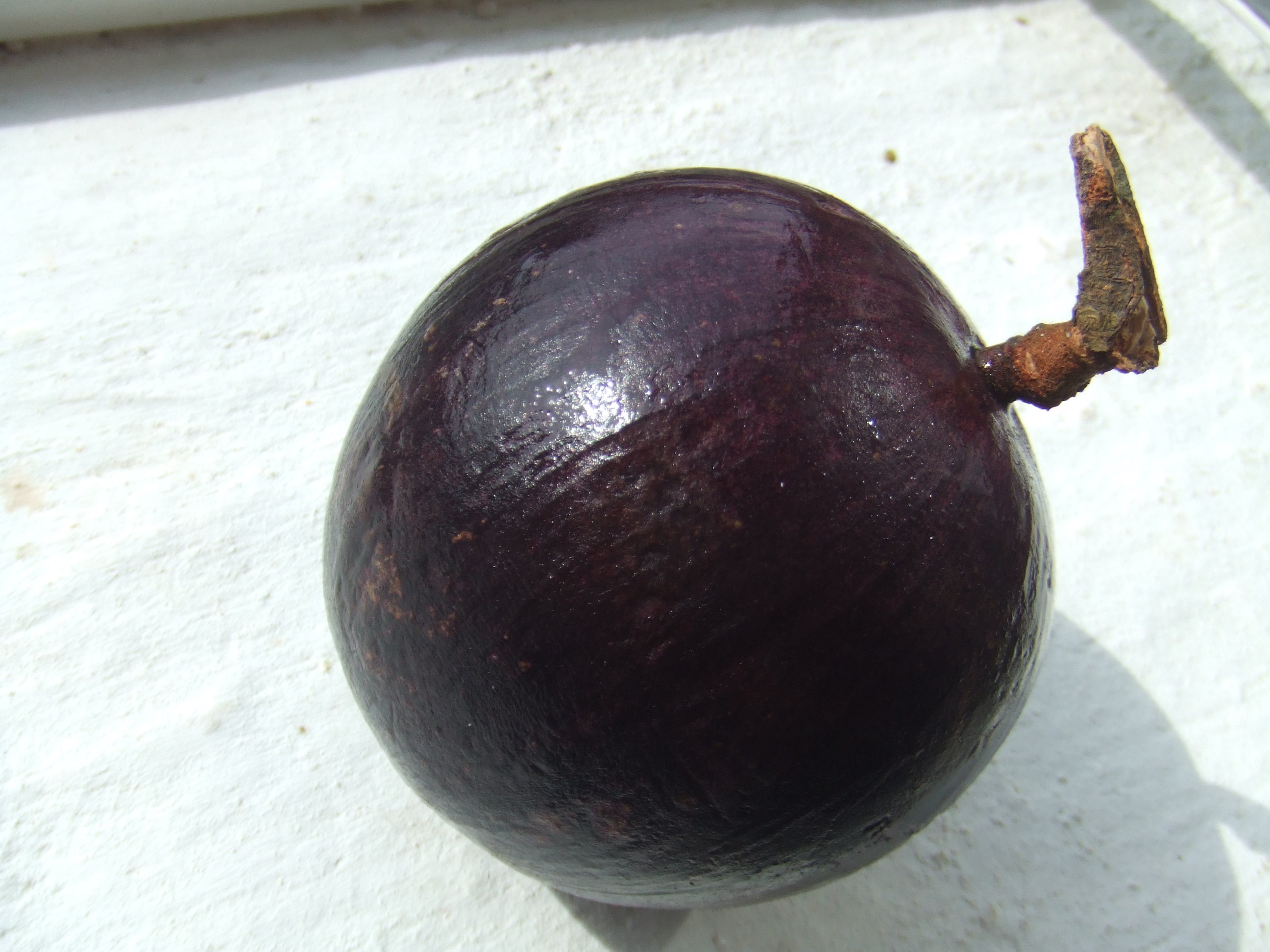
- Fruit

Conservation status
- Least Concern (IUCN 3.1)

Scientific classification
- Kingdom: Plantae
- Clade: Embryophytes
- Clade: Tracheophytes
- Clade: Angiosperms
- Clade: Eudicots
- Clade: Asterids
- Order: Ericales
- Family: Sapotaceae
- Genus: Chrysophyllum
- Species: C. cainito

Binomial name
- Chrysophyllum cainito L.

Synonyms
- Cainito pomiferum Tussac; Chrysophyllum bonplandii Klotzsch ex Miq.; Chrysophyllum caeruleum Jacq.; Chrysophyllum jamaicense Jacq.; Chrysophyllum maliforme L.; Chrysophyllum monopyrenum Spreng.; Chrysophyllum ottonis Klotzsch ex Miq.

= Chrysophyllum cainito =

Species of flowering plant

Chrysophyllum cainito is a tropical tree of the family Sapotaceae. It is native to the Isthmus of Panama, where it was domesticated. It has spread to the Greater Antilles and the West Indies and is now grown throughout the tropics, including Southeast Asia. It grows rapidly and reaches 20 meters in height.

== Name ==
The common names cainito and caimito likely come from the Mayan words cab (juice), im (breast), and vitis (sap), via Spanish. Star apple is a common name. It is also known as the purple apple.

== Description ==
=== Tree ===
The leaves are evergreen, alternate, simple oval, entire, 5–15 cm long; the underside shines with a golden color when seen from a distance. The tiny flowers are purplish white and have a sweet fragrant smell. The tree is also hermaphroditic (self-fertile). It produces a strong odor.

=== Fruit ===
The fruit is globose and typically measures from 2 to 3 inches in diameter. When ripe, it usually has purple skin with a faint green area appearing around the calyx. A radiating star pattern is visible in the pulp. Greenish-white and yellow-fruited cultivars are sometimes available. The skin is rich in latex, and both it and the rind are not edible. The flattened seeds are light brown and hard. It is a seasonal fruit bearing tree.

The fruits are used as a fresh dessert fruit; it is sweet and often served chilled. The fruit also exists in three colors, dark purple, greenish brown and yellow. The purple fruit has a denser skin and texture while the greenish brown fruit has a thin skin and a more liquid pulp; the yellow variety is less common.

A number of related species, also called star apples, are grown in Africa including Gambeya albida and G. africana.

== Gallery ==
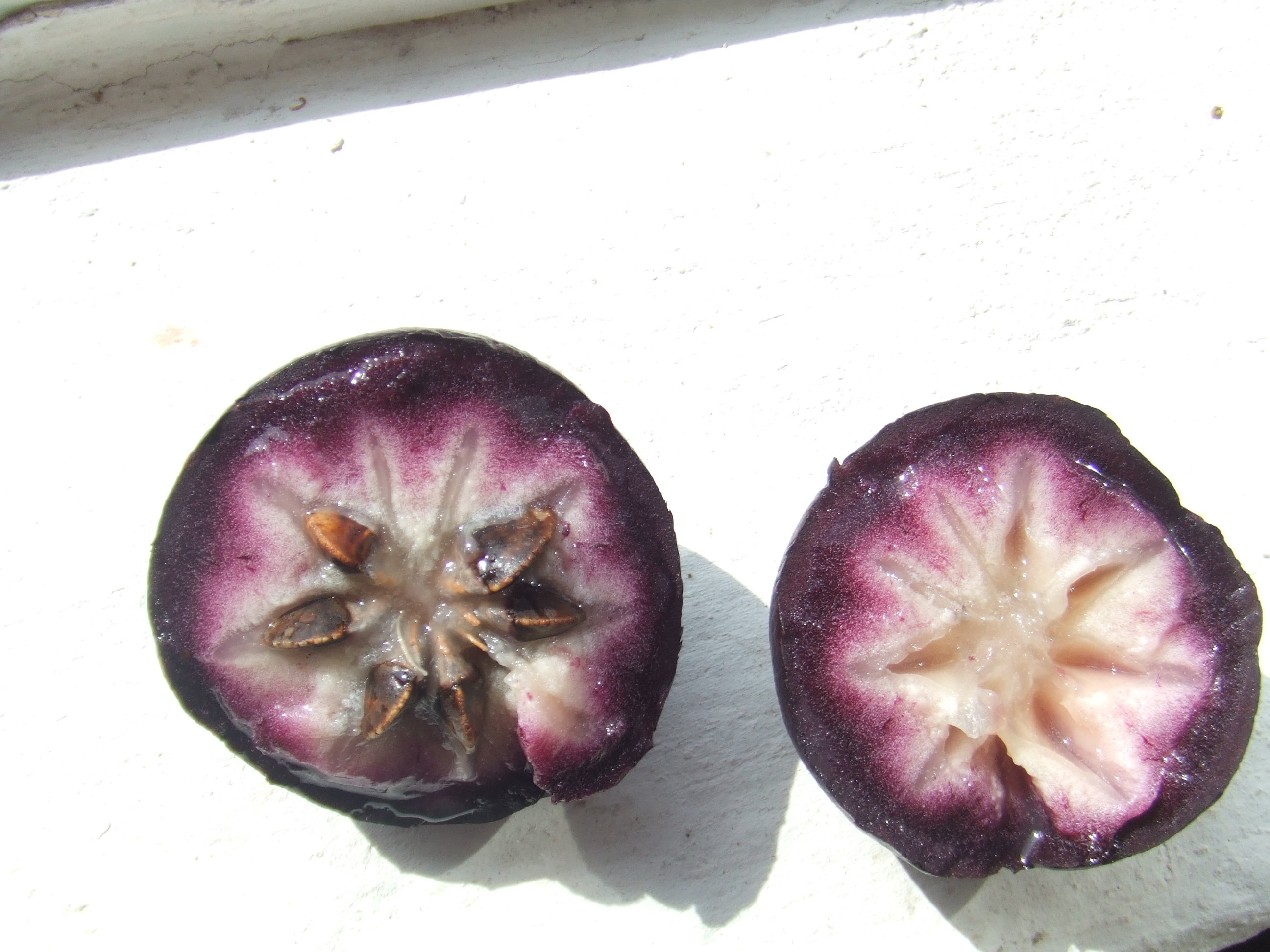
Cainito fruit cut in half

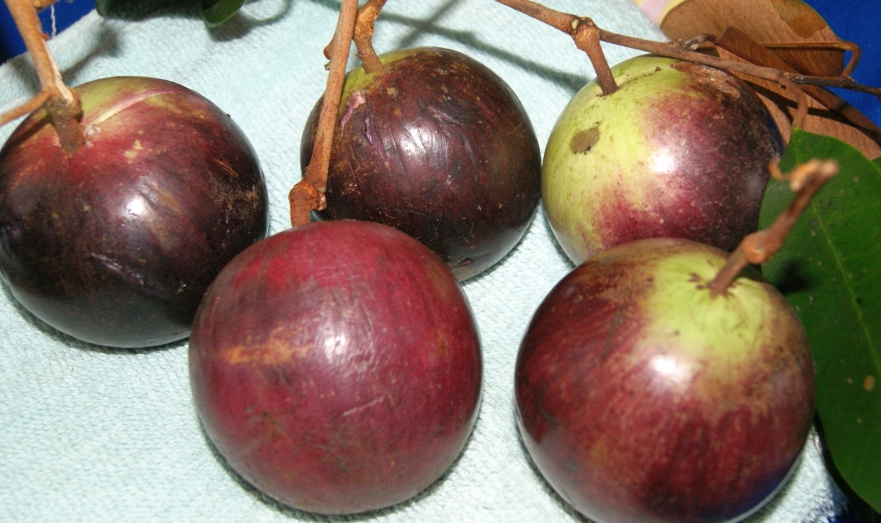
Freshly plucked cainitos

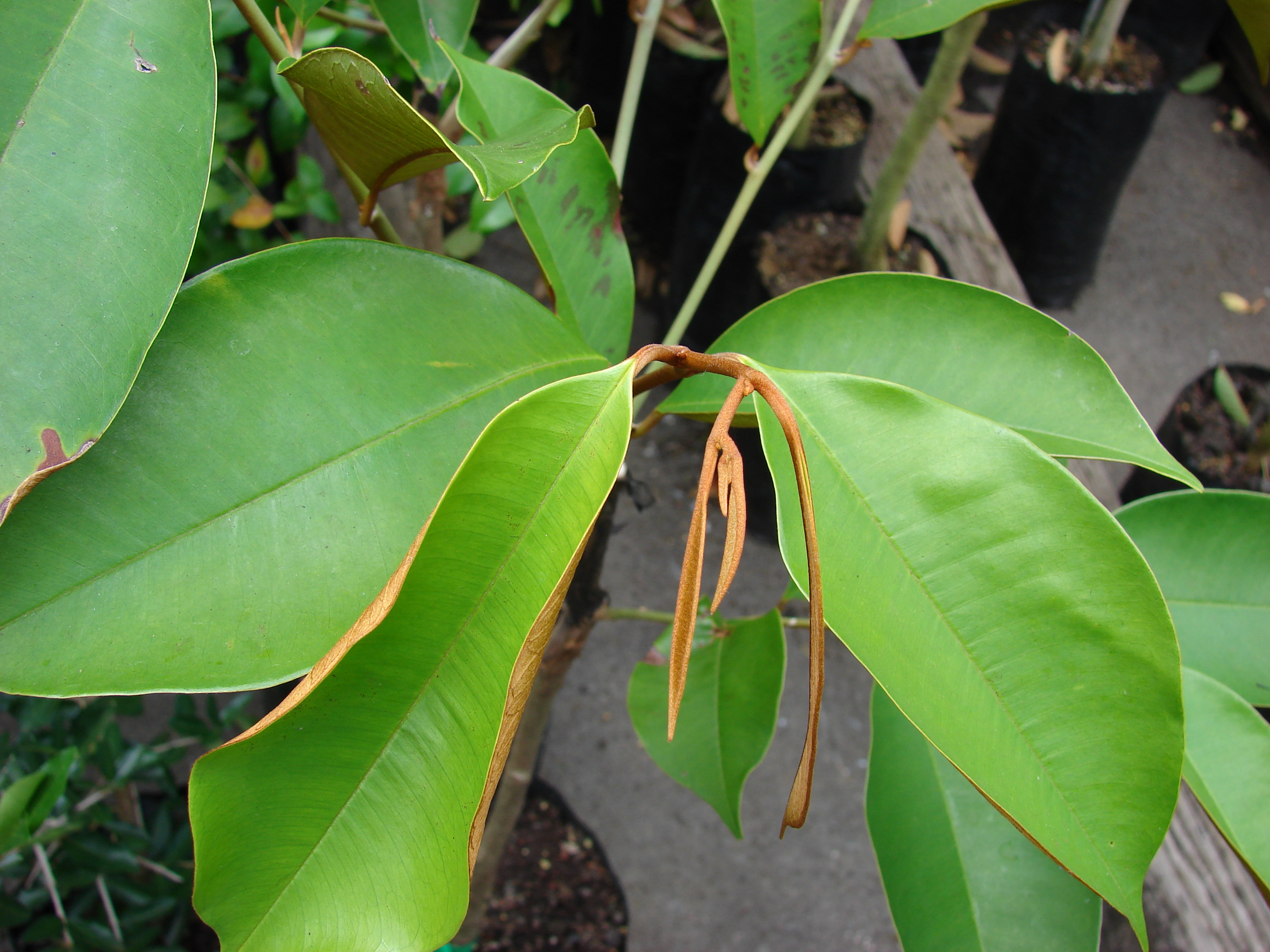
Leaves

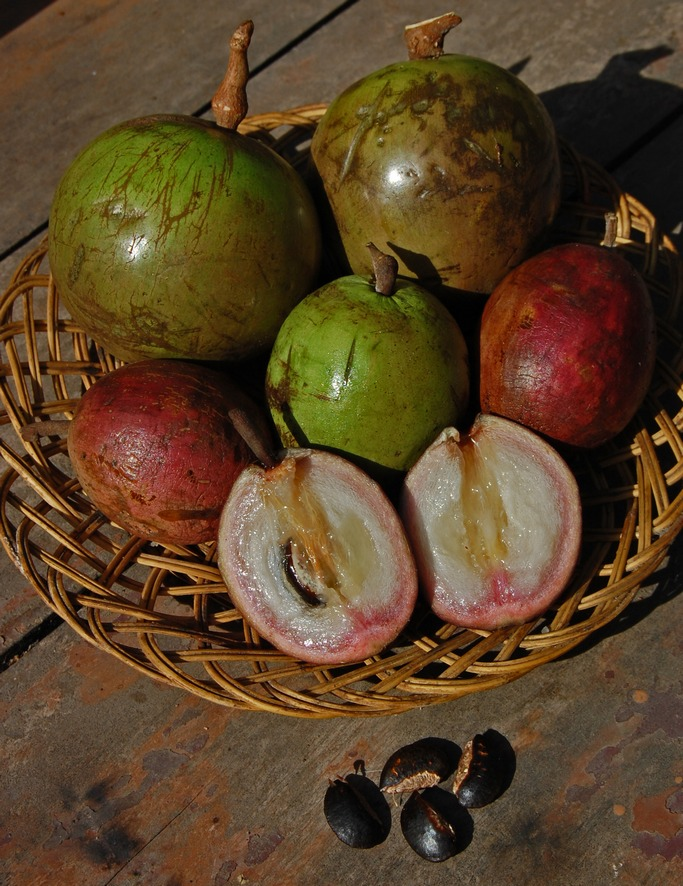
Fruits, usually purple, may also be green or red
