= Okwuabala =

Town in Imos state, Nigeria

Okwuabala is a semi-urban community in Orlu Local Government Area of Imo State, in the Niger Delta region of South Eastern Nigeria. The community shares boundaries with Ogberuru, Mgbe and Amaifeke. The indigenous people of Okwuabala belong to the Igbo ethnic group and the town is situated within the Igbo cultural area. The main language spoken in Okwuabala is the Orsu-Orlu variant of the Igbo language.

== Demographics ==
The current population of Okwuabala is unknown although the last estimate placed the population of Orlu at around 420,000 citizens of which Okwuabala represents a significant proportion as a major semi urban community. Majority of Okwuabala citizens live in the diaspora contributing to the growth and development of other town's and countries.

== Geography ==
Okwuabala is located within the present Orlu Local Government Area, the unofficial commercial capital of Imo state of Nigeria. It is situated within latitude 5-6 degrees north of the equator and longitude 7-8 degrees east of the Greenwich Mean Time (GMT). Okwuabala falls within the Orlu section of the Awka - Orlu uplands.
