= V. rubra =

V. rubra may refer to:

- Varecia rubra, the red ruffed lemur, a mammal species
- Vriesea rubra, a plant species native to Bolivia and Venezuela
