= Ihioma =

Community in Imo State, Nigeria

Coordinates: 5°48′22″N 6°59′54″E

Ihioma is a community in the Orlu section of Imo State in Southeastern Nigeria. It is made up of three major communities Okwuabala, Ebenese and Umuezennachi. Major secondary schools include Green Uzo Comprehensive college and Ihioma girls secondary school.

The area has a school. Soil studies have been conducted in the area. The area has seen conflict from Biafra separatists. Programs for displaced children have been established in the area.
