= Amaifeke =

Coordinates: 5°47′55″N 7°01′14″E

- Urban town
- Location in Nigeria
- Country: Nigeria
- State: Imo
- Local Government Area: Orlu
- Time zone: UTC+1 (West Africa Time)

Amaifeke is an urban town in Orlu Local Government Area LGA of Imo State in the Niger Delta region of South Eastern Nigeria. The town shares the Orlu Urban metropolis area with Umuna and part of Orlu village. The indigenous population of Amaifeke belong to the Igbo ethnic group and the town is situated within the Igbo cultural area. Amaifeke shares boundaries with the following towns; Ihioma, Okporo, Okwuabala, Umuna, Orlu and Owere Ebeiri. The main language spoken in Amaifeke is the Orsu variant of the Igbo language.

== Demographics ==
The current population of Amaifeke is unknown although the last estimate placed the population of Orlu at around 420,000 citizens of which Amaifeke represents a large proportion as a major urban location. There is also a large Amaifeke diaspora that contributes to the town's economy.

== Geography ==
The larger town of Amaifeke was recently divided into three autonomous communities:

- Ofeahia Amaifeke
- Ezioha Amaifeke
- Isiala Amaifeke

Ofeahia has most of the urban areas of the town, including some of the landmark establishments of the Orlu Urban Council: the Orlu Local Government Headquarters building, the Human Development Centre, the Orlu Cheshire Home and the Headquarters of the Orlu zonal Chamber of Commerce, Industries, Mines and Agriculture.

== History ==
During the late 70s and early 80s, Amaifeke indigenes championed the evolution of small and medium scale industries within the Orlu region which helped to light up the socio-economic activities of the Orlu area. Some of the leading industrial establishments in the manufacturing sector include; the Stavico Manufacturing Group, Alfopam Industries and the Seamasters Limited.

The town was also strategic to the secessionist Biafran forces during the Nigerian Civil War as it was used as the centre for the International Relief Operation for Biafra by international Charity Organisations like the Red Cross Society and the Caritas International under the management of Rev.Fr Courtney and assisted by then young Godwin Okwara.

== Notable residents ==
- Chief Achike Udenwa (former Governor of Imo State and Minister for Trade and Commerce)
