= Orlu, Imo State =

Orlu Ọ̀lụ́ (Igbo)
- LGA and city
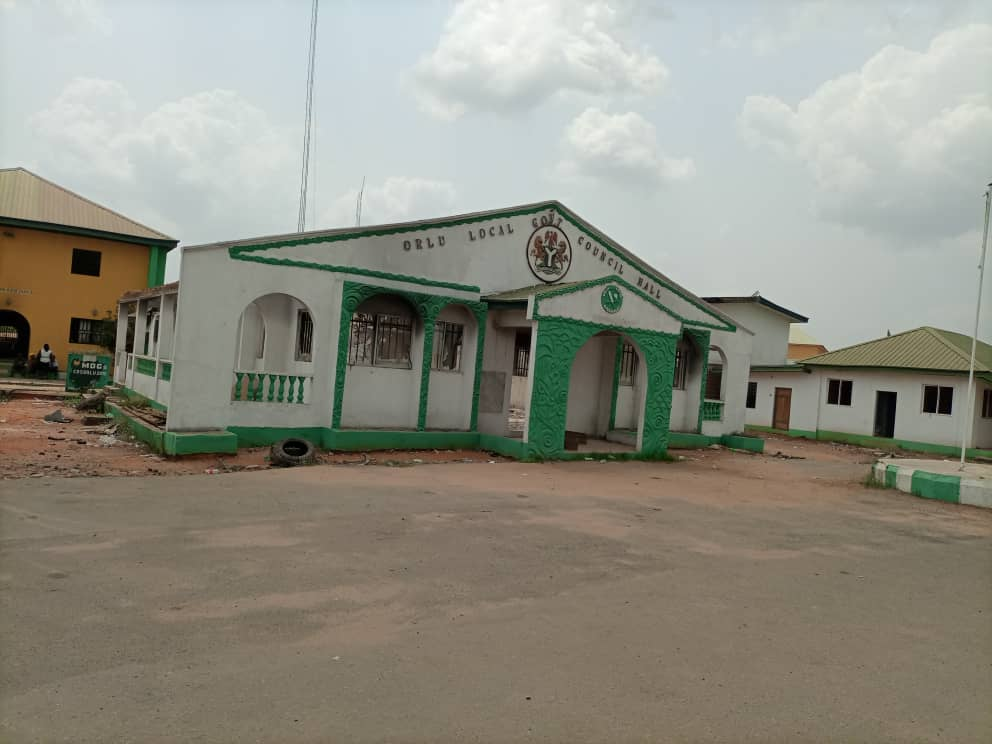
- Orlu headquarters Building
- Interactive map of Orlu
- Location in Nigeria
- Coordinates: 05°47′47″N 07°02′20″E
- Country: Nigeria
- State: Imo

Government
  - Local Government Chairman: Chris Mbarie

Population (420,000)
  - Total: 420,000 (estimated)
- Time zone: UTC+1 (WAT)
- National language: Igbo

Orlu (Igbo: Ọ̀lụ́) is the second-largest city in Imo State, South East, Nigeria, with a population of 420,600. It has a long history as the headquarters for the Organisation of African Unity (OAU) and humanitarian relief agencies during the Nigeria-Biafra Civil War. The city houses the Nigerian headquarters of the British Cheshire Home. It is the second most developed city in Imo state after Owerri.

== History ==
Orlu is considered the homeland of the Igbo people in Nigeria. The residents of Orlu are predominantly of Igbo ethnicity and speak the Isuama dialect of the Igbo language. The inhabitants of the region are known as the Orlu people, after the town, and are considered a distinct Igbo group. The name “Orlu” is derived from the Igbo words “Ọ̀lụ̀” (origin/source) and “ụlọ” (homeland), thus referring to a settlement of the ancestors. Major social and political changes took place in the 19th and early 20th centuries as a result of British colonization. Through the activities of missionaries, the ancient odinani religion was largely supplanted by Christianity. Around 1900, the town became an important hub for missionaries and traders.

During the Biafran War in the 1970s, Orlu served as the headquarters for various humanitarian aid organizations. Since Nigeria’s democratization in 1999, there has been an intensified struggle for self-determination among the region’s population. Consequently, there are calls for the Orlu region to secede from Imo and establish its own state. However, the initiative did not receive the support of the National Assembly until 2005, after which it failed due to political disagreements. In 2024, a bill to create the State of Orlu was introduced in the House of Representatives.

== Commerce and industries ==
Orlu is a home for enterprise and industry and is unofficially known as the "commercial capital" of Imo state. Many successful Nigerian businessmen and industrialists hail from the twelve local government areas that make up the Imo west Senatorial Zone. They include Orlu, Orsu, Isu, Njaba, Nwangele, Nkwerre, Ideato North, Ideato South, Oru East, Oru West, Ohaji/Egbema, and Oguta. The towns of the local government area is within the host communities of Amaifeke, Ihioma/Ebenese, Umuna, Umuowa, Umutanze, Okporo, Orlu-Gedegwum, Amike and Owerre-Ebeiri. When all of the LGAs in the zone are included Orlu's population is estimated to be approaching 3,000,000 inhabitants.

Orlu is the permanent site for various industries including state and federal agencies like the Imo State University Teaching Hospital, the state-owned cardboard industry in Owerri-Ebeiri, the newly built Imo State School of Nursing and Health Technology at Okporo as well as many small and medium-sized chemical and pharmaceutical companies. The multipurpose Imo International Market which houses one of the three most influential pharmaceutical markets in West Africa is based in Orlu due to the high number of Orlulites in the pharmaceutical and chemical industry. Consequently, the Orlu Zonal Area has the highest concentration of indigenous pharmaceutical manufacturers and marketers in the whole African continent.

The Ogbosisi Timber Centre is located within the quickly expanding Orlu Urban area and the city centre. The Nigeria Immigration Training School (NITS) in Umuowa and the Technological Skills Acquisition Centre (TESAC) are also based in the city.

== Cultural festivals ==
Many towns in Orlu hold cultural festivals. The people of Orlu have made important contributions to the education, sports, and political growth of Nigeria.

== Notable people ==
Notable members of the ruling family include Eze Patrick I Ibeakanma Acholonu, the first Senator to represent the Orlu/Okigwe division (presently Orlu Zone and Okigwe Zone) in the old Federation of Nigeria as well as the 1st Republic; the late Justice Ignatius Chukwudi Pats Acholonu, the first Orlu indigene to become a Supreme Court justice; Dr. Douglas Acholonu, former deputy governor of Imo state in the 3rd Republic; Dr. Mrs Catherine Acholonu, author, researcher, playwright and Senior Special Adviser to President Obasanjo in the 4th Republic; Eze Dr. Patrick II Chinedu Acholonu, Igwe XI, Duru IX of Orlu Gedegwum.

The footballer Samuel Okwaraji who died playing for Nigeria hails from Umudioka Orlu, hence the city's main stadium name, Umuowa. The former governor of the state, Chief Achike Udenwa, hails from Amaifeke Orlu while the immediate past governor, and current Senator representing Imo West Senatorial District and Chairman of House Committee on Culture & Tourism Owelle Rochas Okorocha hails from Ogboko where the Eastern Palm University is located, in the outskirts of the city. Orlu Senatorial Zone has produced the highest number of governors in Imo State.

Other notable residents include:

- Ada Jesus – Nigerian actress and comedian
- Chiamaka Nnadozie – Goalkeeper
- Joseph Chukwudi Obidiaso – footballer
- Aliyu Okechukwu – footballer
- Fredrick Ogechi Okwara – footballer
- Samuel Okwaraji – footballer

== Autonomous communities ==
Orlu Local Government Area consists of over thirty-three autonomous communities. They include towns like:

- ( ALAOMA-OWERRE )
- Amaifeke
- Amike
- Eziachi
- Ihioma
- Ihitte-Owerre
- Mgbee
- Obibi-Ochasi
- Orlu Town - Orlu Ishiobiukwu Gedegwum
- Obinugwu Autonomous Community
- Obor
- Ogberuru
- Okporo
- Okwu0werre
- Okwu0rji
- Umudioka Ancient Kingdom
- Umudioka UKWU
- Umueze Autonomous Community
- Umudioka-Owerre
- Umueze
- Umuna
- Umuowa
- Umutanze
- Umuzike

== Missionary activities ==
The Roman Catholic Diocese of Orlu (Latin Dioecesis Orluanus) was erected on November 29, 1980, and houses the Holy Trinity Cathedral, one of the largest cathedrals in west and central Africa. Augustine T. Ukwuoma succeeded Bishop Gregory O. Ochiagha who had served as the Bishop of Orlu since its creation. Orlu is also the location of Nigeria's only parish of the Priestly Fraternity of St. Peter (the Nne Enyemaka Shrine). It also has a diocese of the Anglican communion. The region also has a number of orthodox and Protestant churches to boost its Christian activities.

In addition, there exist an Anglican Diocese of Orlu with its headquarters at Nkwerre created by the Anglican church of Nigeria in 1984 with the Rt.Revd S. Ebo as the first bishop, today, The Anglican diocese of Orlu has over 30 Archdeaconries, more than one hundred and fifty five 155 parishes and over 200 serving priests and over a thousand 1000 indigenous Anglican priests, making it the largest Diocese in imo state after seconded by the Anglican diocese of Owerri with over 50,000 parishioners.

== Climatic information ==
The average annual temperature ranges from 19 to 30 degrees Celsius (66 to 86 degrees Fahrenheit), rarely falling below 14 °C (58 °F) or rising over 32 °C (89 °F).

== Sister cities ==
Orlu is an emeritus sister city with:

- Austin, United States

== See also ==
- Ishiobiukwu Gedegwum
- Catherine Acholonu
- Pats Acholonu
- HRM Eze Patrick I
- Lazarus Olumba
