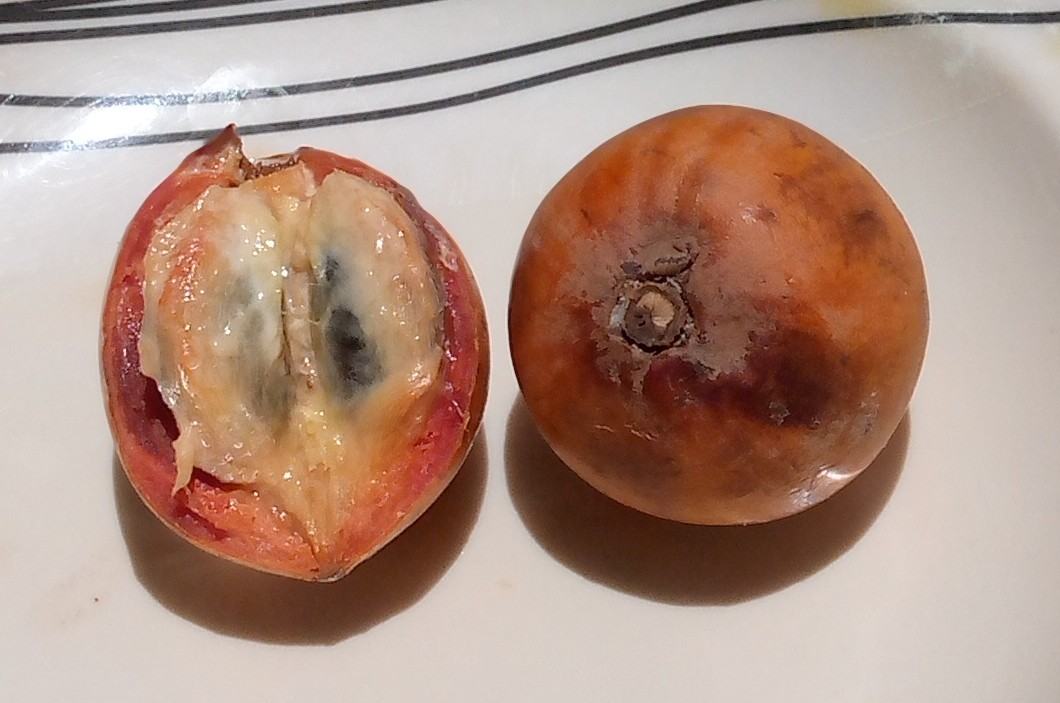

Conservation status
- Near Threatened (IUCN 3.1)

Scientific classification
- Kingdom: Plantae
- Clade: Tracheophytes
- Clade: Angiosperms
- Clade: Eudicots
- Clade: Asterids
- Order: Ericales
- Family: Sapotaceae
- Genus: Gambeya
- Species: G. albida

Binomial name
- Gambeya albida (G.Don) Aubrév. & Pellegr. (1961)

Synonyms
- Achras sericea Schumach. & Thonn. (1827), nom. illeg.; Chrysophyllum albidum G.Don (1837); Chrysophyllum henriquesii Engl. (1904); Chrysophyllum kayei S.Moore (1909); Chrysophyllum millenianum Engl. (1904); Planchonella albida (G.Don) Baehni (1965)

= Gambeya albida =

Species of tree

Gambeya albida, commonly known as white star apple, is a forest fruit tree commonly found throughout tropical Africa. It is closely related to the African star apple (Gambeya africana) which is also common throughout West Africa. Some schools of thought feel that they may just be a variety of the same species. Also in the family is the purple star apple (Chrysophyllum cainito).

Amongst the Igbo of Nigeria, it is called udara while it is called agbalumọ (agbalumo) by Yoruba people. The Efiks of Southern Nigeria call it udari with the usage of the latter term, coincidentally, also permeating across much of south-western Nigeria (i.e., further east of Akoko-Ondo) and the northern (Hausa-Fulani) parts of the country. The Hausa people refer to it as agwaluma, a term they adopted from the Yoruba language counterpart.

The inherent sweetness of a child (or person of especially-seasoned cognisance/age who otherwise displays certain amiability-desirable characteristics representative of children and/or well-adjusted adults, e.g., well-roundedness, joviality, unassuming understanding) has been likened to the fruit in Igbo, as 'udala nwannu'.
