= Orlu State bill =

New State creation bill in South East, Nigeria

The Orlu State bill, was a proposed bill sponsored by Ikenga Ugochinyere and 15 other legislators from the South-east region of Nigeria. The bill, which passed its 1st reading at the Nigerian House of Representatives on 5 June 2024, sought to carve out parts of Imo, Abia, and Anambra states to create a new state officially to be known as Orlu. Its proposed capital would be Orlu, currently the second-largest city in Imo State and Ideato, its Senatorial District.

== Reactions ==
The Ọhanaeze Ndigbo Youth Council said the new state creation bill is provocative and unacceptable.

The Anambra State communities of Ozubulu and Umunze rejected the proposal, stating they would continue to be part of Anambra State instead of Orlu State. The Abia State community of Umunneochi Local Government Council also rejected the proposal and instead proposed the creation of "Etiti State."

House of Representatives member Chinwe Nnabuife, representing Orumba South and North of Anambra State, rejected the proposal. She said her constituency was not part of it.

House of Representatives member representing Nnewi North/Nnewi South/Ekwusigo Federal Constituency of Anambra State, rejected the proposal. He said he was not against it but proper consultations should be done.

Socio-cultural organisation, "Ogbako Ohaji People’s Forum" rejected the inclusion of Ohaji local government area of Imo State.
