= Gambeya gorungosana =

Scientific classification
- Kingdom: Plantae
- Clade: Tracheophytes
- Clade: Angiosperms
- Clade: Eudicots
- Clade: Asterids
- Order: Ericales
- Family: Sapotaceae
- Genus: Gambeya
- Species: G. gorungosana

Binomial name
- Gambeya gorungosana (Engl.) Liben (1988)

Synonyms
- Chrysophyllum gorungosanum Engl. (1904); Chrysophyllum fulvum S.Moore (1911)

Species of tree

Gambeya gorungosana is species of evergreen tree native to the highlands of eastern and central Africa.

== Range and habitat ==
Gambeya gorungosana ranges across eastern and central Africa, from Mozambique and Zimbabwe through Zambia, Malawi, Tanzania, Burundi, Rwanda, and eastern Democratic Republic of the Congo to Uganda and Kenya, and in Angola, Gabon, and Cameroon.

It is a characteristic tree in the Afromontane rain forests of the tropical African highlands, generally found on higher-rainfall slopes between 1200 and 2500 meters elevation.
