= Gambeya =

Scientific classification
- Kingdom: Plantae
- Clade: Tracheophytes
- Clade: Angiosperms
- Clade: Eudicots
- Clade: Asterids
- Order: Ericales
- Family: Sapotaceae
- Subfamily: Chrysophylloideae
- Genus: Gambeya; Pierre (1891)

Genus of plants

Gambeya is a genus of flowering plants belonging to the family Sapotaceae.

Its native range is tropical Africa. It is found in the countries of Angola, Benin, Burundi, Cabinda, Cameroon, Central African Republic, Chad, Republic of the Congo, Democratic Republic of the Congo, Equatorial Guinea, Gabon, Ghana, Guinea, the Gulf of Guinea Islands, Ivory Coast, Kenya, Liberia, Madagascar, Malawi, Mozambique, Nigeria, Rwanda, Sierra Leone, Sudan, Tanzania, Uganda, Zambia, and Zimbabwe.

The genus of Gambeya was named in honour of Henri Gambey (1787–1847), French mechanic and entrepreneur who made precision instruments (sextants, compasses, etc.) for many scientists. It was first described and published by Jean Baptiste Louis Pierre in Notes Bot. Sapot. on page 61 in 1891.

== Species ==
Known species, according to Kew:

- Gambeya africana (A.DC.) Pierre – western and central Africa
- Gambeya albida (G.Don) Aubrév. & Pellegr. - western and central Africa to Kenya and Tanzania
- Gambeya azaguieana (J.Miège) Aubrév. & Pellegr. – Liberia, Côte d'Ivoire, and Ghana
- Gambeya beguei (Aubrév. & Pellegr.) Aubrév. & Pellegr. – Côte d'Ivoire and central Africa
- Gambeya boiviniana Pierre – Madagascar and Comoro Islands
- Gambeya boukokoensis Aubrév. & Pellegr. – central Africa
- Gambeya gigantea (A.Chev.) Aubrév. & Pellegr. – western and west-central Africa
- Gambeya gorungosana (Engl.) Liben – Afromontane eastern and southeastern Africa, Angola, Gabon, and Cameroon
- Gambeya korupensis Ewango & Kenfack – Cameroon
- Gambeya lacourtiana (De Wild.) Aubrév. & Pellegr. – west-central Africa
- Gambeya lungi (De Wild.) Aubrév. & Pellegr. – Republic of the Congo and Democratic Republic of the Congo
- Gambeya muerensis (Engl.) Liben – South Sudan, Uganda, and eastern Democratic Republic of the Congo
- Gambeya perpulchra (Mildbr. ex Hutch. & Dalziel) Aubrév. & Pellegr. – west and central Africa to Uganda and Tanzania
- Gambeya prunifolia (Baker) Aubrév. & Pellegr. – Nigeria and Bioko
- Gambeya subnuda (Baker) Pierre – western and central Africa to Uganda
- Gambeya taiensis (Aubrév. & Pellegr.) Aubrév. & Pellegr. – Côte d'Ivoire
