= Amike =

- Town
- Nickname: Ikechukwu
- Interactive map of Amike
- Coordinates: 5°46′39″N 7°3′51″E
- Country: Nigeria
- State: Imo State
- LGA: Orlu

Government
  - Type: Ancient Kingdom.
  - Ruler: HRM Eze Godwin Agbanyim
- Time zone: UTC+1 (WAT)

Amike is a town and an Ancient Kingdom in Orlu Local Government Area of Imo State, Nigeria. Amike is composed of Villages which include Umuokwaraebika, Umudimodu, Umudimoha, Umuowerre, Eshime, Umuduruewuru, Umudim, Umutukutu, Umuduruelem, Umugboga (Umuduruji), Umukwalam (Ekwealo) and Umuanu.

== Location ==
Amike autonomous community is located in the Southern part of Orlu Local Government Area of Imo State, Nigeria and stretched southwards to the border of Orlu and Nkwerre by Amaokpara, bounded on the North by Umudioka Ukwu and Orlu town, on the West by Eziachi and East by a mountainous Forest at the border of Orlu and Ideato. The current traditional ruler of Amike Autonomous Community is HRM Eze (Dr) Godwin AO Agbanyim, the Eze Ahurukwe of Amike.
