= Acholonu =

- Gender: Unisex
- Language: Igbo

Origin
- Origin: Nigeria
- Meaning: The courage of my father
- Region of origin: South Eastern region

Acholonu audio is a family name that belongs to the ruling dynasty in Orlu, Imo state, Nigeria.

== Notable people bearing the name ==
- Catherine Obianuju Acholonu (1951–2014), Nigerian author, professor and presidential adviser to former president Obasanjo
- D. D. Acholonu (born 1980), Canadian football player
- Emmanuel Acholonu, former Nigerian naval commander and Military Administrator of Katsina State
- Pats Acholonu (1936–2006), former supreme court justice of Nigeria

== See also ==
- Ishiobiukwu Gedegwum
- Dynasty
- Non-sovereign African monarchs
- List of Nigerian traditional states
