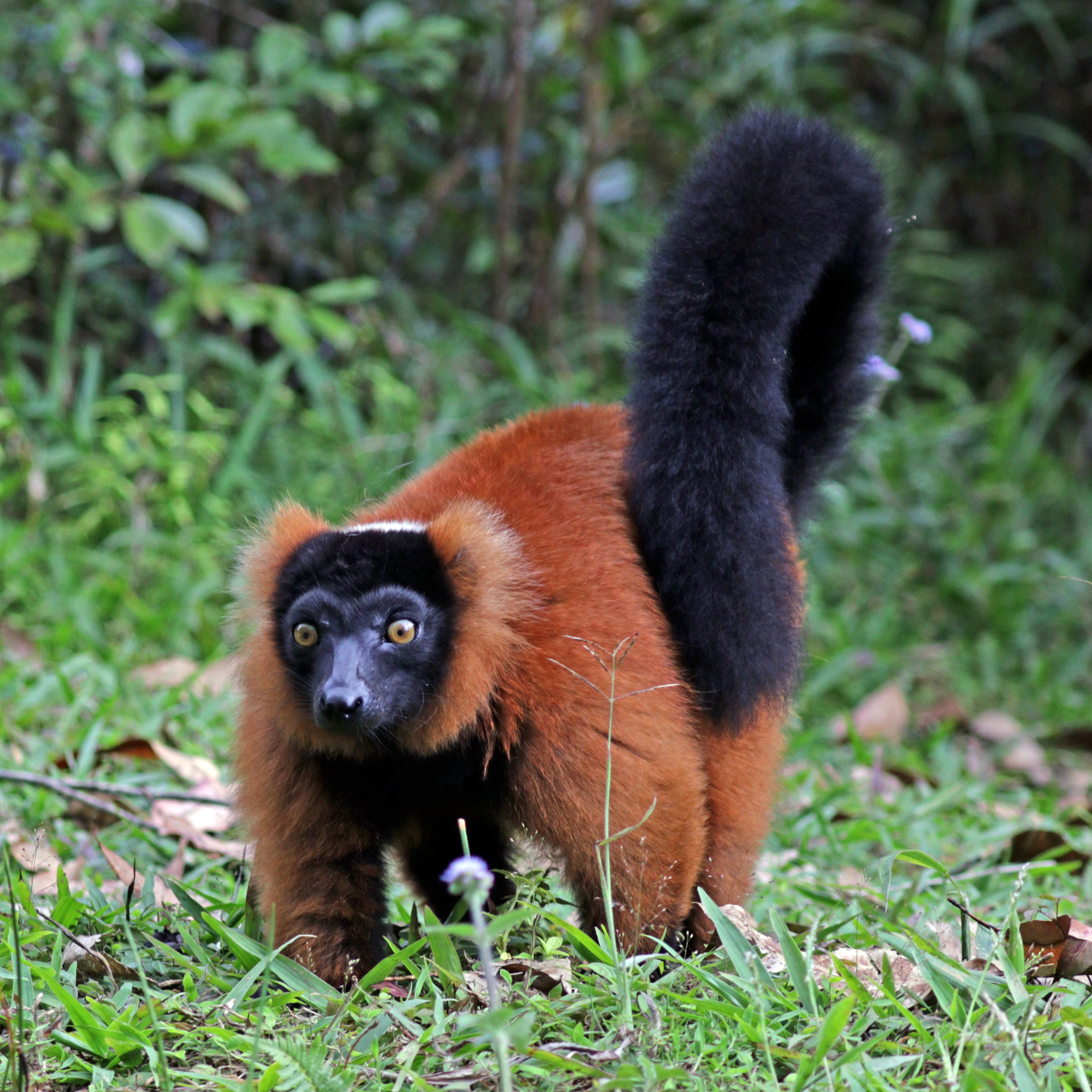

Conservation status
- Critically Endangered (IUCN 3.1)
- CITES Appendix I

Scientific classification
- Kingdom: Animalia
- Phylum: Chordata
- Class: Mammalia
- Order: Primates
- Suborder: Strepsirrhini
- Family: Lemuridae
- Genus: Varecia
- Species: V. rubra

Binomial name
- Varecia rubra (É. Geoffroy, 1812)
- Distribution of V. rubra

Synonyms
- erythromela Lesson, 1840

= Red ruffed lemur =

Species of mammal native to Madagascar

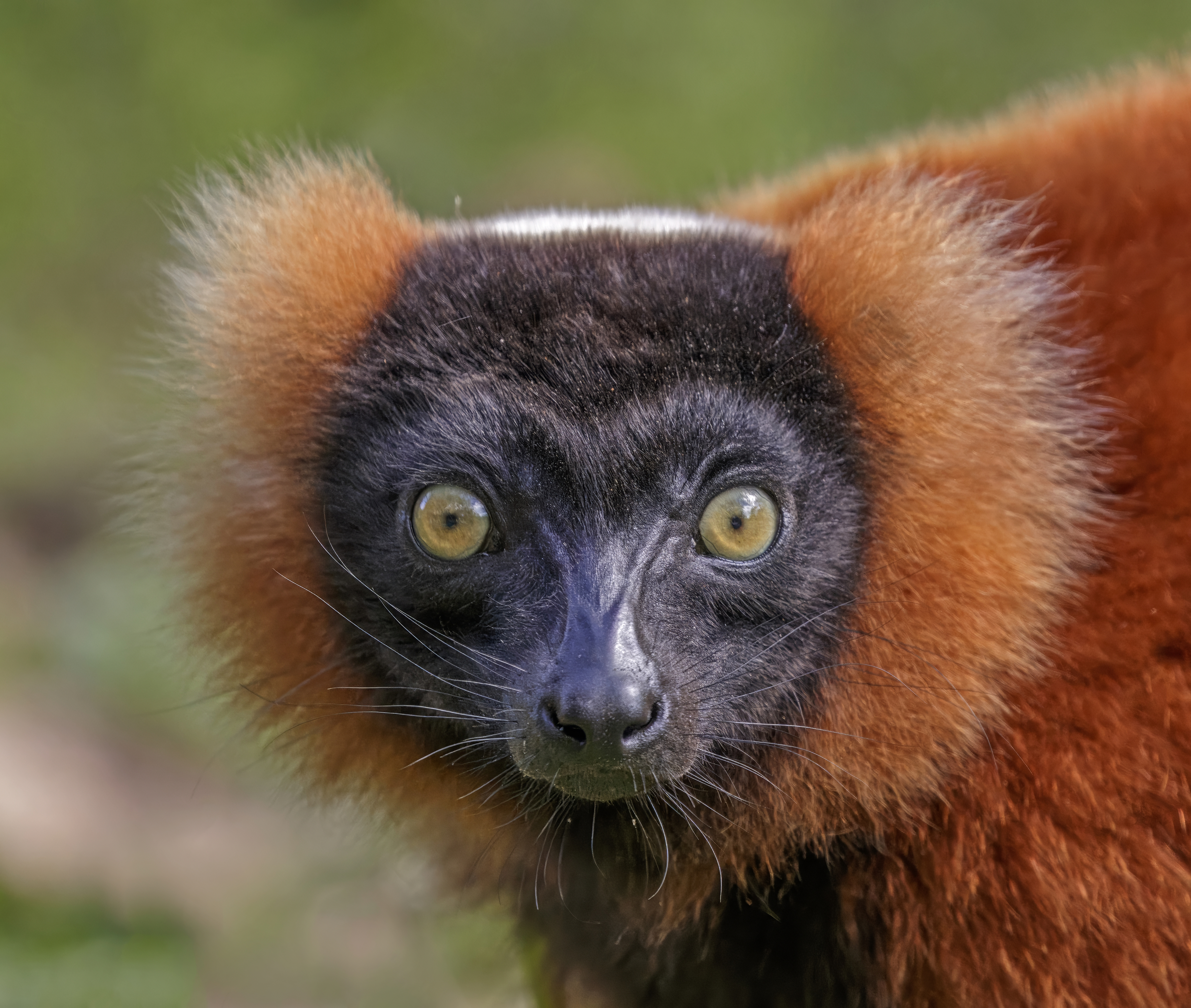

The red ruffed lemur (Varecia rubra) is one of two species in the genus Varecia, the ruffed lemurs; the other is the black-and-white ruffed lemur (Varecia variegata). Like all lemurs, it is native to Madagascar. It occurs only in the rainforests of Masoala, in the northeast of the island. It is one of the largest primates of Madagascar with a body length of 53 cm, a tail length of 60 cm and a weight of 3.3–3.6 kg. Its soft, thick fur is red and black in color and sports a buff or cream colored spot at the nape, but a few are known to have a white or pink patch on the back of the limbs or digits and a ring on the base of the tail in a similar color.

== Physical characteristics ==
Ruffed lemurs are the largest members of the family Lemuridae, with this species being the larger of the two. They weigh 3.3–3.6 kg (7.3–7.9 lb). They are about 53 cm (21 in) long, with a 60 cm (24 in) tail. Females are slightly larger than males. They have slender bodies and long legs. Red ruffed lemurs have a narrow snout with small back ears that are sometimes hidden by their long fur. They groom themselves using their toothcomb.

As their name would suggest, they have a rust-coloured ruff and body. Their heads, stomachs, tails, feet, and the insides of their legs are black. They have a white patch on the back of their neck, and may also have white markings on their feet or mouth.

== Behavior ==
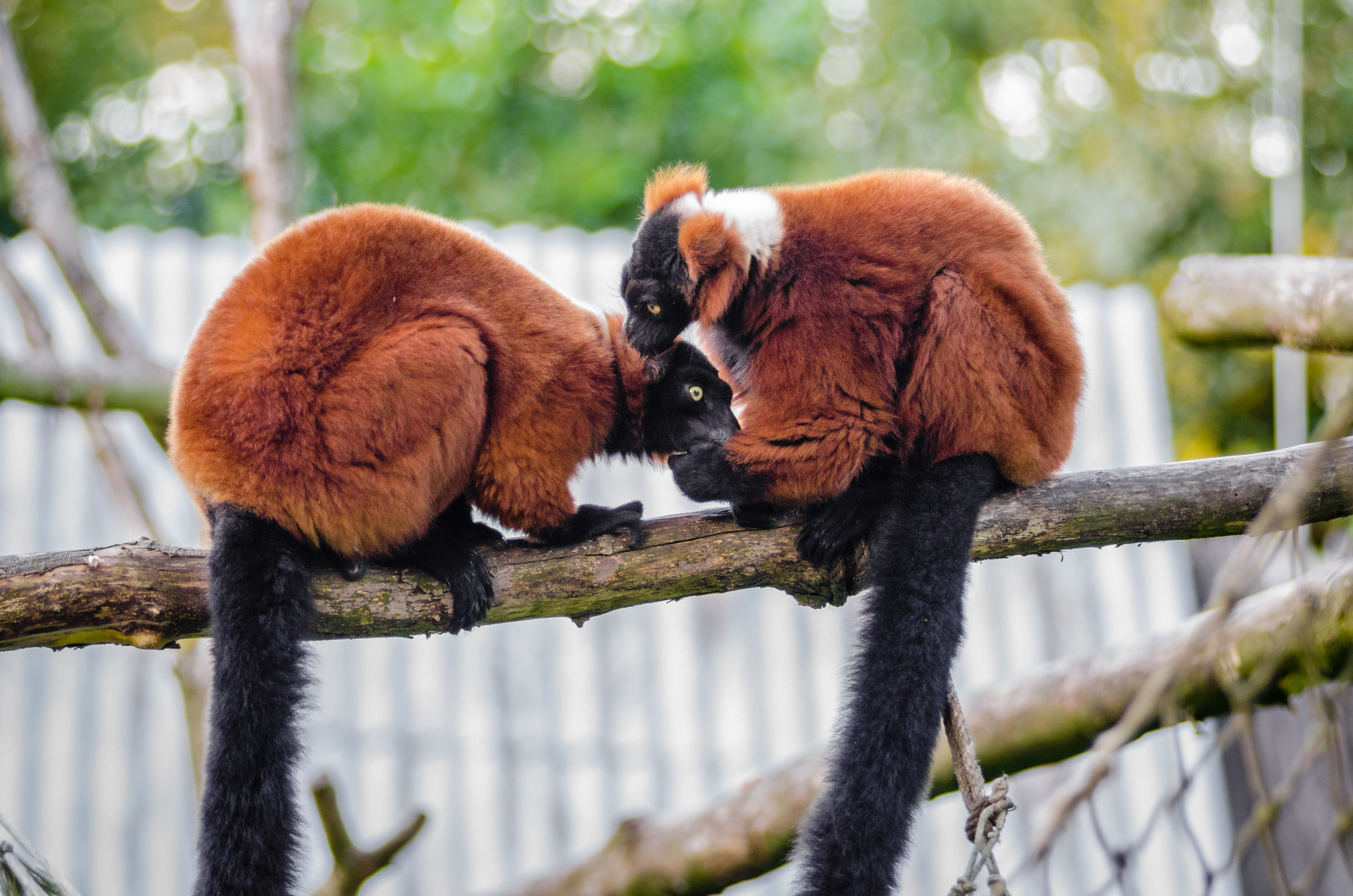
Red ruffed lemurs grooming each other

The red ruffed lemur is a very clean animal and spends a lot of time grooming itself and in social grooming. The lower incisors (front teeth) and the claw on the second toe of the hind foot are specially adapted for this behavior. The lower incisors grow forward in line with each other and are slightly spaced. This creates a toothcomb which can be used to groom its long, soft fur. The claw is also used for grooming.

The red ruffed lemur lives 15–20 years in the wild. In captivity, 25 years is not uncommon, and one lived to be 35 years old. It is a diurnal animal, and most active in the morning and evening.

=== Social systems ===
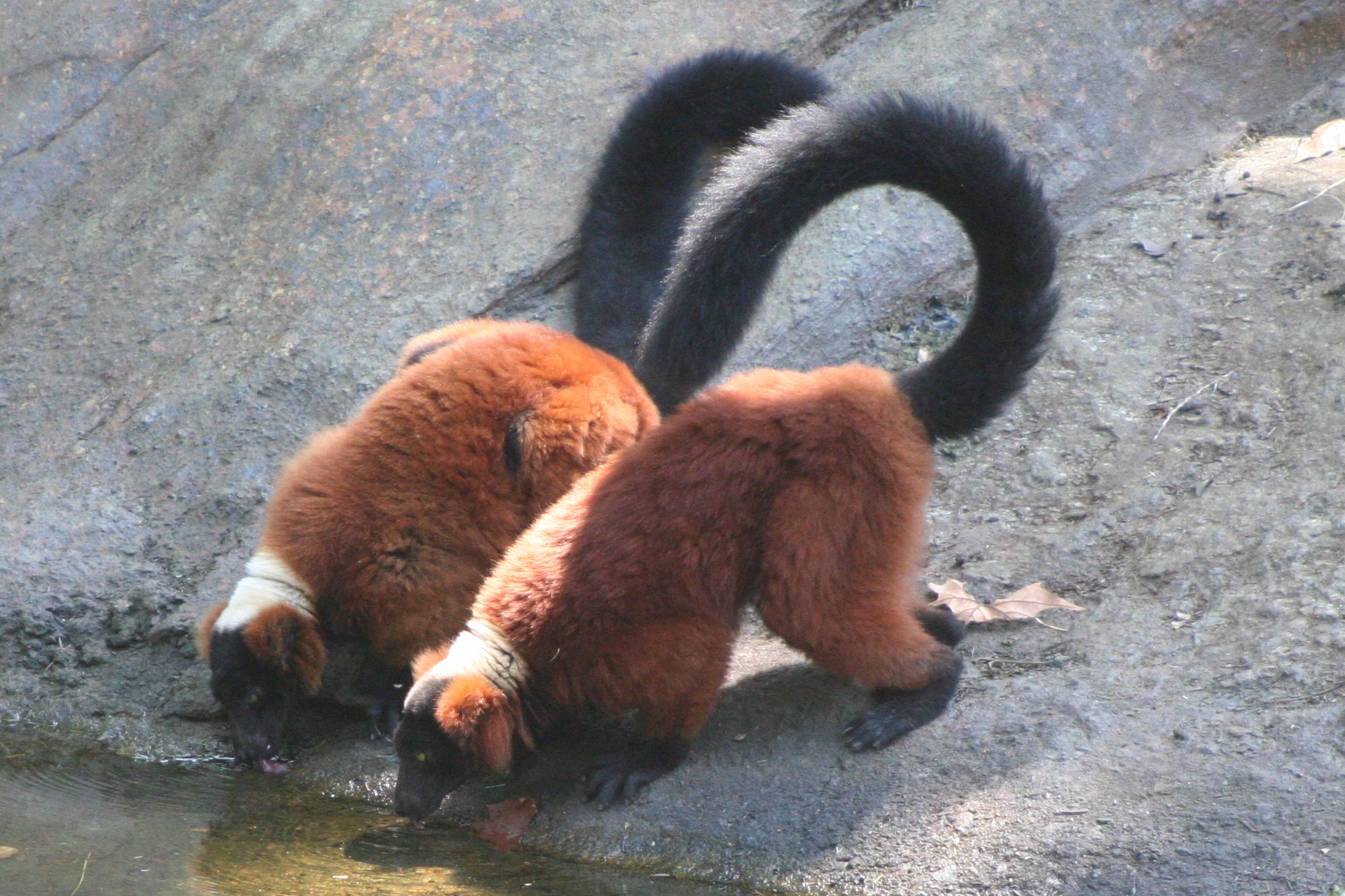
A pair of red ruffed lemurs drinking

This primate typically lives in small, matriarchal groups of 2–16 individuals, but group sizes of up to 32 have been recorded. Its diet consists primarily of fruit, nectar, and pollen. Leaves and seeds may be eaten when fruit becomes scarce. Red ruffed lemurs will sometimes form large groups during the wet season when food is plentiful. They will all find one food source and forage together as a group. During the dry season they will often separate and find food on their own when fruits are scarce. This is unusual behavior as most other diurnal lemurs will stay together and forage in large groups even during the dry season. Field studies suggest that red ruffed lemurs, like black-and-white ruffed lemurs, may be found in monogamous pairs or in small, organized groups. Individuals out in the forest communicate through loud booming calls, which can be heard over considerable distances.

=== Breeding and reproduction ===
Red ruffed lemurs reach sexual maturity at about two years of age, and start reproducing at about three years of age. Unlike all other diurnal primates, females keep their infants in nests 10–20 m (33–66 ft) above the forest floor, made with twigs, leaves, vines, and fur. Like all lemurs, and many Madagascar mammals, it has a fixed breeding season which takes place towards the end of the dry season (May to July). This is so the young can be born in the wet season when more food is available. Ruffed lemurs are also the only primates with litters of young, and, after a gestation period of 102 days, the female may give birth to up to six, although two or three is more typical. Newborns have fur and can see, but as they cannot move, the female leaves them in the nest until they are seven weeks old. Females can nurse up to six infants at the same time. Infant red ruffed lemurs are not as well developed at birth as other lemurs. This is not surprising because red ruffed lemurs have extremely short gestation periods. At birth, infants are not able to hold onto the mother. When she moves the infants she picks them up one by one. Mothers usually move their infants away from the nest after a week or two. When she forages she leaves her infants in a nearby tree. In the few days after she gives birth, if the mother needs to leave the nest, the father will stand guard. Weaning occurs at four months. It is estimated that 65% of young do not reach three months of age, and often die by falling from the trees.

=== Diet ===
The red ruffed lemur are herbivores and are primarily frugivorous, though it is known to eat leaves and shoots. They especially like figs.

=== Communication ===
The Duke Lemur Center has recorded about twelve different calls. The red ruffed lemur and Black-and-White Ruffed Lemur understand each other's calls, despite living in different parts of Madagascar. Scent marking is also an important means of communication.

== Conservation status ==
The IUCN Red List states that the red ruffed lemur is critically endangered. Logging, burning of habitat, cyclones, mining, hunting, and the illegal pet trade are primary threats. They also have natural predators such as large snakes, eagles, and the fossa. The creation of the Masoala National Park in 1997 has helped protect this species, but many red ruffed lemurs do not live within the park's boundaries, and are still at high risk.

Recent studies show that they are critically endangered with a declining wild population. Illegal logging has increased since 2009, which has reduced the available forest habitat. Illegal logging for valuable tropic hardwoods, such as rosewood, is a particular threat, and linked to political instability. The captive population of red ruffed lemurs stands at 590 animals. The population of red ruffed lemurs is directed by a Species Survival Plan. Several of these zoos work with each other in breeding and caring for the captive population. To prevent inbreeding, wild caught animals have been introduced to the captive breeding program.
