= Gambeya boiviniana =

Conservation status
- Least Concern (IUCN 3.1)

Scientific classification
- Kingdom: Plantae
- Clade: Tracheophytes
- Clade: Angiosperms
- Clade: Eudicots
- Clade: Asterids
- Order: Ericales
- Family: Sapotaceae
- Genus: Gambeya
- Species: G. boiviniana

Binomial name
- Gambeya boiviniana Pierre (1891)

Synonyms
- Chrysophyllum boivinianum (Pierre) Baehni (1965); Gambeya boiviniana var. lavanchiana Aubrév. (1974); Gambeya madagascariensis Lecomte (1920)

Species of tree

Gambeya boiviniana, commonly known as famelona, is species of evergreen tree native to Madagascar and the Comoro Islands.

== Range and habitat ==
Gambeya boiviniana ranges through eastern, northern, and northwestern Madagascar and the Comoro Islands, between sea level and 1,750 meters elevation.

It is native to the lowland rain forests of eastern Madagascar, the humid montane forests of Madagascar's Central Highlands, the montane forests of Montagne d'Ambre on Madagascar's northern tip, and the subhumid lowland forests of the Sambirano region in northwestern Madagascar. It is also found in the Comoros.
