= Obi (ruler) =

Igbo king

An Obi is the central building in an Igbo homestead, one used most commonly as a place for the reception of guests.

As such, it can also be looked at symbolically as a metaphor for the most important part, or heart, of any given place. In fact, due to this, it is otherwise almost exclusively taken to be an aristocratic title amongst the tribe, meaning either elder in the first instance or king in the second.

== List of Obis who reign as traditional kings ==
- Obi of Ogwashi-Uku
  - As of 2007, the Obi of Ogwashi-Uku is Eze Chukwuka Okonjo.
- Obi of Onitsha
  - As of 2004, the Obi of Onitsha is Igwe Nnaemeka Alfred Ugochukwu Achebe.
- Obi of Neni
  - As of 2004, the Obi of Neni is Eze Ngobidy Nwora Emannuel Sandi.
- Obi of Aboh
  - As of 2024, the Obi of Aboh is Dr. Greg Nnamdi Oputa.
- Obi of Otolo
  - As of 1963, the Obi of Otolo is His Royal Highness Igwe Kenneth Onyeneke Orizu III, who also acts as the supreme monarch (Igwe) of Nnewi.

== See also ==
- Nigerian traditional rulers
