= Ugwuele =

- Archaeological site
- Location within Nigeria
- Coordinates: 5°51′21″N 7°30′43″E
- Country: Nigeria
- State: Abia
- Local Government Area: Isuikwuato
- Town: Uturu

Ugwuele is an Igbo community in Uturu, Isuikwuato Local Government Area, Abia State in Nigeria which houses a Stone Age site that provides evidence that humans inhabited the region as far back as 250,000 years ago. It was the largest hand axe factory in Nigeria, and possibly in the world.

== Archaeological findings ==
The archaeological site at Ugwuele-Uturu, which lies on a dolerite ridge, was excavated between 1977 and 1981. Archaeologists were led to the site by local people who were aware of the unusual artifacts to be found there.

The site features three layers of artifacts, suggesting three phases of occupation. The oldest and lowest holds quartz flakes, small stone tools and points. Above that is a layer with hoe-like tools, polished stone axes, red ochre, bored stone and red pottery. The top level, with dates between 2935 BC and 15 AD, held grey pottery wares.

The site has been described as a workshop. Its northern end was a virtual scree, containing a huge accumulation of Stone Age artifacts up to 6 metres (20 ft) deep. There was no pottery and no polished stone tools, but there were triangular preforms for bifacial tools as well as many flakes and some cores. It is possible that these tools were rough or unsuccessful attempts, and the successful tools were carried elsewhere to be refined further.

Hand axes, mostly broken, accounted for 80% of the tools found, and there were also cleavers, picks and sidescrapers. Based on this mix, the site has been classified as Acheulean. The Ugwuele hand ax is also particularly notable for archaeologists since it resembles the same tool found in the Acheulean sites, which emerged in France, England, India, and North Africa.

== Interpretation ==
Sources claimed that the Ugwuele settlement was populated by the ancestors of the lower Niger and West African peoples and they achieved a distinct Stone Age level civilization based on agriculture. The occupants were hominids associated with Homo erectus and the earliest Homo sapiens, who are believed to have been hunter-gatherers. Ugwuele underwent cultural developments, demonstrating advances in the arts and religion, which featured the worship of a creator god and intermediary spirits.
