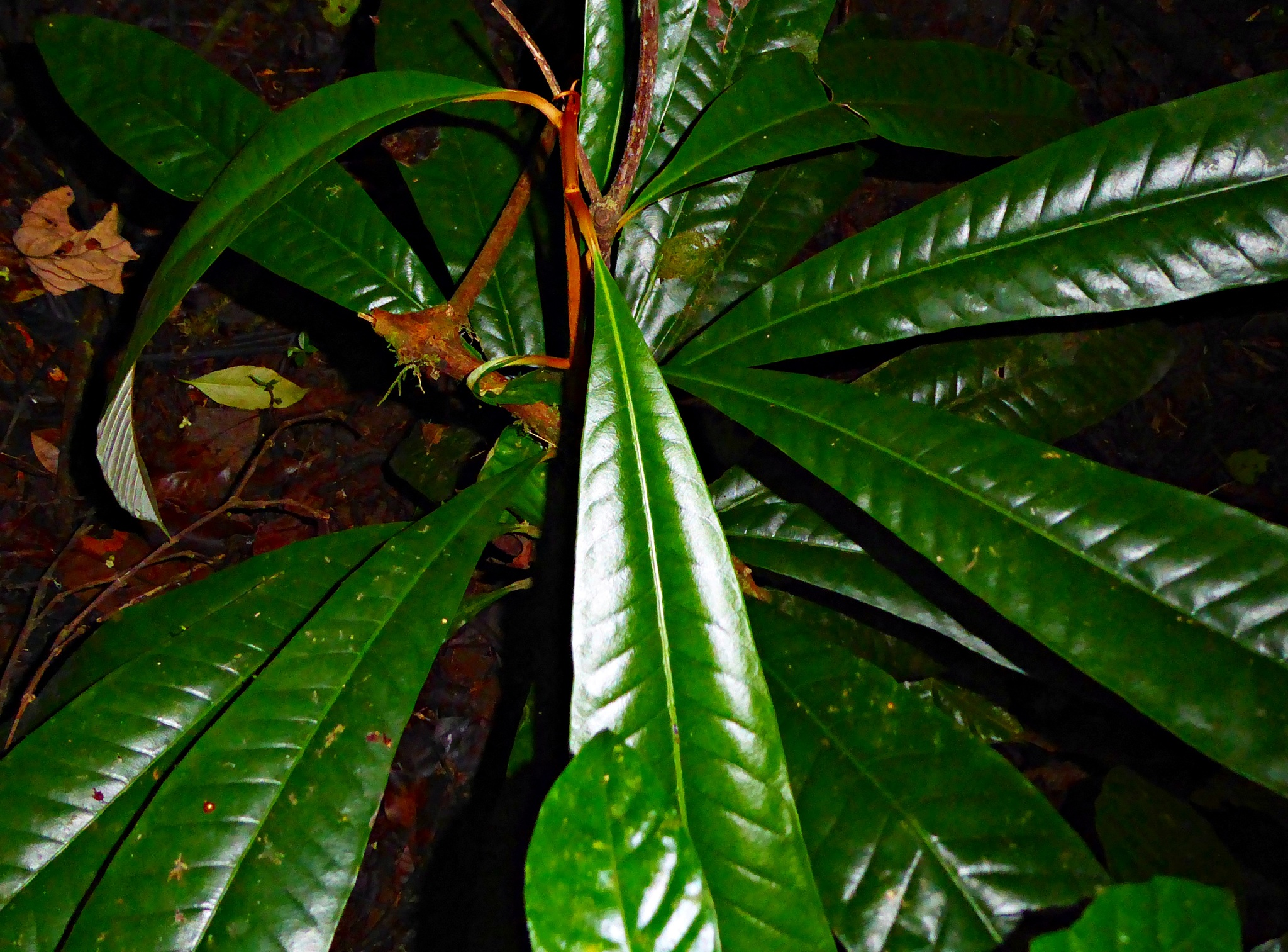

Conservation status
- Least Concern (IUCN 3.1)

Scientific classification
- Kingdom: Plantae
- Clade: Tracheophytes
- Clade: Angiosperms
- Clade: Eudicots
- Clade: Asterids
- Order: Ericales
- Family: Sapotaceae
- Genus: Gambeya
- Species: G. africana

Binomial name
- Gambeya africana (A.DC.) Pierre (1891)

Synonyms
- Chrysophyllum africanum A.DC. (1844); Chrysophyllum africanum var. aubrevillei (Pellegr.) Aubrév. (1936); Chrysophyllum africanum var. multinervatum De Wild. (1926); Chrysophyllum delevoyi De Wild. (1926); Chrysophyllum edule Hoyle (1932); Chrysophyllum macrophyllum Sabine (1824), nom. illeg.; Chrysophyllum omumu J.D.Kenn. (1936), sphalm.; Gambeya africana var. aubrevillei Pellegr. (1931 publ. 1932); Gambeya kali Aubrév. & Pellegr.(1961); Planchonella africana (A.DC.) Baehni (1965)

= Gambeya africana =

Species of plants

Gambeya africana is a medium-sized species of tree in the family Sapotaceae. Along with the closely related species Gambeya albida, it is sometimes known as African star apple. Both species have similar leaf indumentum and are widespread in the Lower and Upper Guinea forest mosaic.

== Description ==
Species reaches 25 meters in height, the trunk is straight, often grooved and angular with buttressed roots at the base. Bark is greyish brown to dark brown with white latex exuding from slash. Leaves simple and appear at the end of branches in tufts; petiole is 1.5-3.5 cm long, the abaxial surface has dense and appressed hairs and varies in color from pale brown to reddish-brown, adaxial surface is glabrous; leaf-blade is elliptical to oblong, 15-35 cm long and 5-13 cm wide, with 18-26 primary nerves on each side spaced 1-2 cm apart. Fruit is ovoid to globular shaped, with up to 5 shiny brown elliptical seeds; the fruit is rounded at the base, pointed or rounded at apex, 2.3-3 cm in diameter and up to 7 cm long, when ripe is it yellowish to orange colored.

== Distribution ==
Gambeya africana grows in West and Central Africa, from Guinea eastwards to Uganda and southwards to the Democratic Republic of the Congo and Cabinda. It is commonly found in lowland rainforest vegetation, near rivers.

== Uses ==
Latex is obtained from the tree bark and used for birdlime while the wood is often mixed with other African Gambeya species traded in the timber market. The fruit is edible though acidulous, while bark extracts are used in decoctions to improve digestion.
