= Pats Acholonu =

Supreme Court Justice of Nigeria

Ignatius Chukwudi Pats Acholonu (also known as Crown Prince Hon. Justice Ignatius Chukwudinka Kingsley Pats Acholonu JSC, CON or Pats-Acholonu, July 15, 1936 – May 14, 2006) was a Justice of the Supreme Court of Nigeria from Orlu, Imo State.
