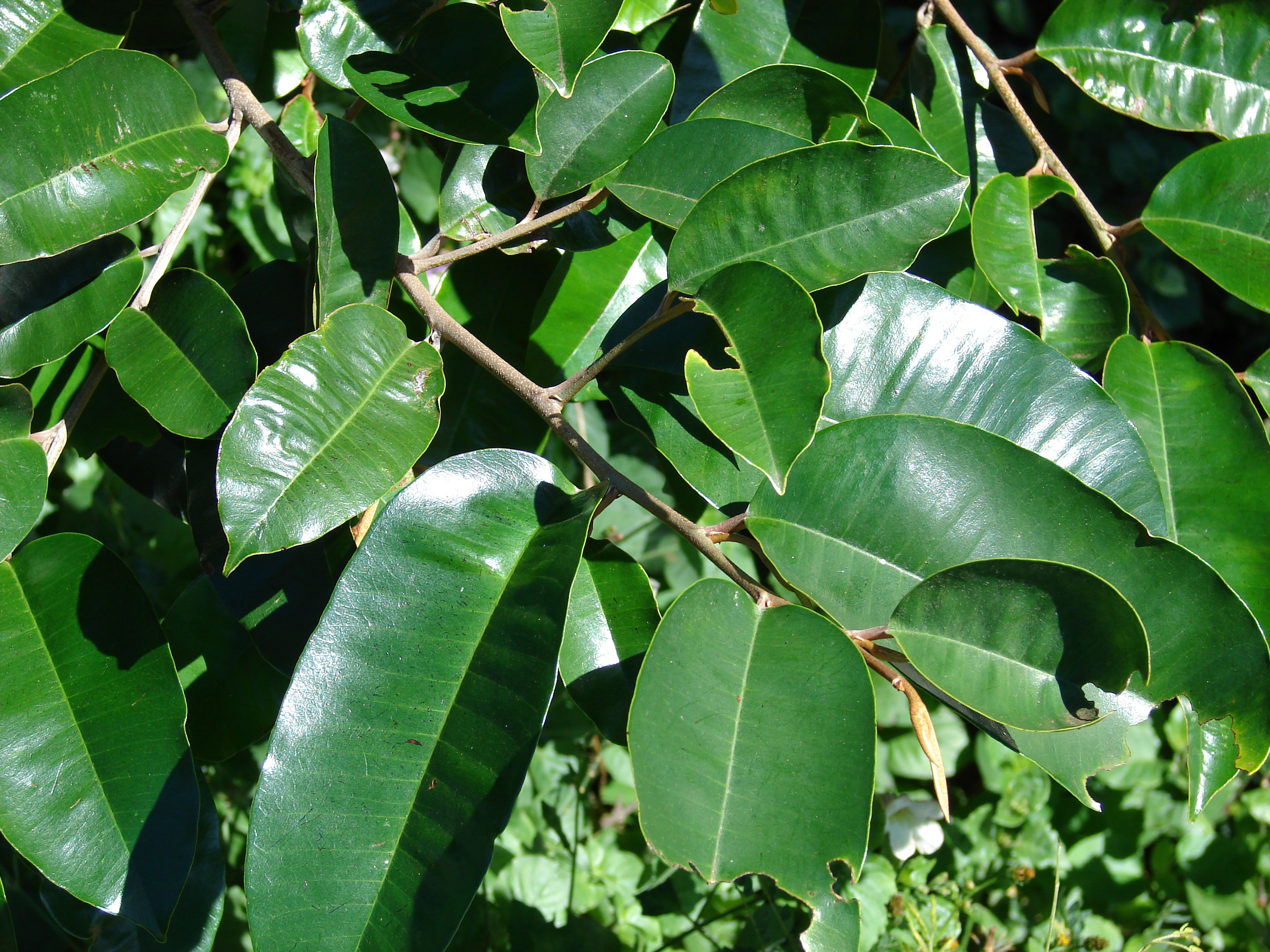
- Chrysophyllum oliviforme

Scientific classification
- Kingdom: Plantae
- Clade: Embryophytes
- Clade: Tracheophytes
- Clade: Angiosperms
- Clade: Eudicots
- Clade: Asterids
- Order: Ericales
- Family: Sapotaceae
- Subfamily: Chrysophylloideae
- Genus: Chrysophyllum; L.

Synonyms
- Cainito Plum. ex Adans., nom. superfl.; Chlorophyllum Liais, orth. var.; Cynodendron Baehni; Dactimala Raf.; Gambeyobotrys Aubrév.; Guersentia Raf.; Nycterisition Ruiz & Pav.; Villocuspis (A.DC.) Aubrév. & Pellegr.

= Chrysophyllum =

Genus of flowering plants

Chrysophyllum is a group of trees in the Sapotaceae described as a genus by Linnaeus in 1753.

The genus is native to the tropical Americas, from Mexico to northern Argentina, including the Caribbean. One species, C. oliviforme, extends north to southern Florida.

== Description ==
Chrysophyllum members are usually tropical trees, often growing rapidly to 10–20 m or more in height. The leaves are oval, 3–15 cm long, green above, densely golden pubescent below, from which the genus is named. The flowers are small (3–8 mm), purplish white and have a sweet fragrant smell; they are clustered several together, and are hermaphroditic (self fertile). The fruit is edible; round, usually purple skinned (sometimes greenish-white), often green around the calyx, with a star pattern in the pulp; the flattened seeds are light brown and hard. The fruit skin is chewy like gum, and contrary to some reports, is edible.

In 1990 and 1991 T.D. Pennington adopted a wide circumscription of Chrysophyllum, giving it a Pantropical distribution. Later morphological and phylogenetic studies confirmed that the genus defined by Pennington was polyphyletic, and in 2017 De Faria et al. proposed that Chrysophyllum be more narrowly circumscribed, and some species placed in the revived genera Achrouteria, Cornuella, Martiusella, Nemaluma, Prieurella, and Ragala.

== Species ==
As of April 2025, Plants of the World Online accepts the following 37 species:

- Chrysophyllum acreanum A.C.Sm. – Brazil (Acre, Amazonas)
- Chrysophyllum albipilum Cronquist – Peru (San Martín)
- Chrysophyllum arenarium Allemão – eastern Brazil
- Chrysophyllum argenteum Jacq. – West Indies, Central America, N South America
- Chrysophyllum aulacocarpum Ernst – Miranda
- Chrysophyllum bicolor Poir. – Hispaniola, Puerto Rico, Virgin Islands
- Chrysophyllum brenesii Cronquist – Nicaragua, Costa Rica, Panama
- Chrysophyllum cainito L. – Belize, Jamaica, Cayman Is
- Chrysophyllum contumacense Sagást. & M.O.Dillon – Peru
- Chrysophyllum euryphyllum T.D.Penn. – Colombia
- Chrysophyllum flexuosum Mart. – Brazil
- Chrysophyllum hirsutum Cronquist – Panama, Costa Rica
- Chrysophyllum inornatum Mart. – S Brazil
- Chrysophyllum januariense Eichler – Espírito Santo, Rio de Janeiro
- Chrysophyllum lanatum T.D.Penn. – Colombia
- Chrysophyllum lancisepalum R.Lima – Brazil (Bahia, Espírito Santo)
- Chrysophyllum lucentifolium Cronquist – Panama, Costa Rica, South America
- Chrysophyllum manabiense T.D.Penn. – Ecuador
- Chrysophyllum marginatum (Hook. & Arn.) Radlk. – South America
- Chrysophyllum mexicanum Brandegee – Mexico, Central America
- Chrysophyllum moralesiananum Aguilar, D.Santam. & J.M.Chaves – Costa Rica
- Chrysophyllum oliviforme L. – Florida, West Indies
- Chrysophyllum ovale Rusby – Peru, Bolivia, Acre
- Chrysophyllum paranaense T.D.Penn. – São Paulo, Paraná
- Chrysophyllum parvulum Pittier – Colombia, Venezuela
- Chrysophyllum pauciflorum Lam. – Puerto Rico to Virgin Islands
- Chrysophyllum pubipetalum Sossai & Alves-Araújo – Brazil (Espirito Santo)
- Chrysophyllum reitzianum Mattos – Santa Catarina
- Chrysophyllum revolutum Mart. & Eichler – Peru
- Chrysophyllum rufum Mart. – E Brazil
- Chrysophyllum sierpense Aguilar, D.Santam. & J.M.Chaves – Costa Rica
- Chrysophyllum sparsiflorum Klotzsch ex Miq. – Venezuela, Guyana, Brazil, Bolivia
- Chrysophyllum splendens Spreng. – E Brazil
- Chrysophyllum striatum T.D.Penn. – Panama
- Chrysophyllum subspinosum Monach. – Bahia
- Chrysophyllum superbum T.D.Penn. – Amazonas
- Chrysophyllum wilsonii T.D.Penn. – Amazonas

Formerly included

- Achrouteria durifructa W.A.Rodrigues (as C. durifructum (W.A.Rodrigues) T.D.Penn)
- Achrouteria eximia (Ducke) Swenson (as C. eximium Ducke)
- Achrouteria pomifera Eyma (as C. pomiferum (Eyma) T.D.Penn.)
- Chloroluma gonocarpa (Mart. & Eichler) Baill. ex Aubrév. (as C. gonocarpum (Mart. & Eichler) Engl.)
- Chloroluma viridis (Mart. & Eichler) Aubrév. (as C. viride Mart. & Eichler)
- Cornuella venezuelanensis Pierre (as C. venezuelanense (Pierre) T.D.Penn.)
- Donella ambrensis Aubrév. (as C. ambrense (Aubrév.) G.E.Schatz & L.Gaut.)
- Donella analalavensis Aubrév. (as C. analalavense (Aubrév.) G.E.Schatz & L.Gaut.)
- Donella bangweolensis (R.E.Fr. & Pellegr.) Mackinder (as C. bangweolense R.E.Fr. & Pellegr.)
- Donella capuronii (G.E.Schatz & L.Gaut.) Mackinder & L.Gaut. (as C. capuronii G.E.Schatz & L.Gaut.)
- Donella delphinensis Aubrév. (as C. delphinense (Aubrév.) G.E.Schatz & L.Gaut.)
- Donella fenerivensis Aubrév. (as C. fenerivense (Aubrév.) G.E.Schatz & L.Gaut.)
- Donella guereliana (Aubrév.) Mackinder (as C guerelianum (Aubrév.) G.E.Schatz & L.Gaut.)
- Donella masoalensis Aubrév. (as C. masoalense (Aubrév.) G.E.Schatz & L.Gaut.)
- Donella perrieri Lecomte (as C. perrieri (Lecomte) G.E.Schatz & L.Gaut.)
- Donella pruniformis (Engl.) Pierre ex Engl. (as C. pruniforme Engl.)
- Donella viridifolia (J.M.Wood & Franks) Aubrév. & Pellegr. (as C. viridifolium J.M.Wood & Franks)
- Donella ubangiensis (De Wild.) Aubrév. (as C. ubangiense (De Wild.) Govaerts)
- Englerophytum longepedicellatum (De Wild.) L.Gaut. (as C. longifolium De Wild.)
- Englerophytum magalismontanum (Sond.) T.D.Penn. (as C. magalismontanum Sond.)
- Englerophytum oblanceolatum (S.Moore) T.D.Penn. (as C. tessmannii Engl. & K.Krause)
- Gambeya africana - (A.DC.) Pierre (as C. africanum A.DC.)
- Gambeya albida (G.Don) Aubrév. & Pellegr. (as C. albidum G.Don)
- Gambeya azaguieana (J.Miège) Aubrév. & Pellegr. (as C. azaguieanum J.Miège)
- Gambeya beguei (Aubrév. & Pellegr.) Aubrév. & Pellegr. (as C. beguei (Aubrév. & Pellegr.) Aubrév. & Pellegr.)
- Gambeya boiviniana Pierre (as C. boivinianum (Pierre) Baehni)
- Gambeya boukokoensis Aubrév. & Pellegr. (as C. boukokoense (Aubrév. & Pellegr.) L.Gaut.)
- Gambeya gigantea (A.Chev.) Aubrév. & Pellegr. (as C. giganteum A.Chev.)
- Gambeya gorungosana (Engl.) Liben (as C. gorungosanum Engl.)
- Gambeya lacourtiana (De Wild.) Aubrév. & Pellegr. (as C. lacourtianum De Wild.)
- Gambeya lungi (De Wild.) Aubrév. & Pellegr. (as C. lungi De Wild.)
- Gambeya muerensis (Engl.) Liben (as C. muerense Engl.)
- Gambeya taiensis (Aubrév. & Pellegr.) Aubrév. & Pellegr. (as C. taiense Aubrév. & Pellegr.)
- Jacquinia arborea Vahl (as C. barbasco Loefl.)
- Martiusella imperialis (Linden ex K.Koch & Fintelm.) Pierre (as C. imperiale (Linden ex K.Koch & Fintelm.) Benth. ex Salomon)
- Micropholis rugosa (Sw.) Pierre (as C. rugosum Sw.)
- Palaquium philippense (Perr.) C.B.Rob. (as C. philippense Perr.)
- Pouteria alnifolia (Baker) Roberty (as C. alnifolium Baker)
- Pouteria gardneri (Mart. & Miq.) Baehni (as C. gardneri Mart. & Miq.)
- Pouteria macrophylla (Lam.) Eyma (as C. macrophyllum Lam.)
- Pouteria reticulata (Engl.) Eyma (as C. reticulatum Engl.)
- Pradosia brevipes (Pierre) T.D.Penn. (as C. soboliferum Rizzini)
- Pradosia lactescens (Vell.) Radlk. (as C. burahem Riedel)
- Prieurella colombiana Aubrév. (as C. colombianum (Aubrév.) T.D.Penn.)
- Prieurella cuneifolia (Rudge) Swenson (as C. cuneifolium (Rudge) A.DC.)
- Prieurella manaosensis Aubrév. (as C. manaosense (Aubrév.) T.D.Penn.)
- Prieurella prieurii (A.DC.) Aubrév. (as C. prieurii A.DC.)
- Prieurella wurdackii Aubrév. (as C. amazonicum T.D.Penn.)
- Ragala bombycina (T.D.Penn.) Swenson (as C. bombycinum T.D.Penn.)
- Ragala sanguinolenta Pierre (as C. sanguinolentum (Pierre) Baehni)
- Ragala scalaris (T.D.Penn.) Swenson (as C. scalare T.D.Penn.)
- Ragala ucuquirana-branca (Aubrév. & Pellegr.) W.A.Rodrigues (as C. ucuquirana-branca (Aubrév. & Pellegr.) T.D.Penn.)
