= Prieurella =

Scientific classification
- Kingdom: Plantae
- Clade: Tracheophytes
- Clade: Angiosperms
- Clade: Eudicots
- Clade: Asterids
- Order: Ericales
- Family: Sapotaceae
- Subfamily: Chrysophylloideae
- Genus: Prieurella; Pierre

Species
- 5; see text

Genus of flowering plants

Prieurella is a genus of flowering plants in the genus Sapotaceae. It includes five species native to the tropical Americas, ranging from Nicaragua to central Brazil.

- Prieurella colombiana Aubrév. – Nicaragua to northern Peru
- Prieurella cuneifolia (Rudge) Swenson – Ecuador and Peru to northern Brazil, Suriname, and French Guiana
- Prieurella manaosensis Aubrév. – Colombia, Ecuador, and Peru to northern Brazil, Suriname, and French Guiana
- Prieurella prieurii (A.DC.) Aubrév. – Panama to Peru, the Guianas, and northern Brazil
- Prieurella wurdackii Aubrév. – Colombia, Venezuela, Ecuador, Peru, and northern and west-central Brazil
