= Damson plum =

Damson plum may refer to:

- Prunus domestica subsp. insititia, or damson, a subspecies of plum tree
- Chrysophyllum oliviforme, a tree of the Caribbean region
