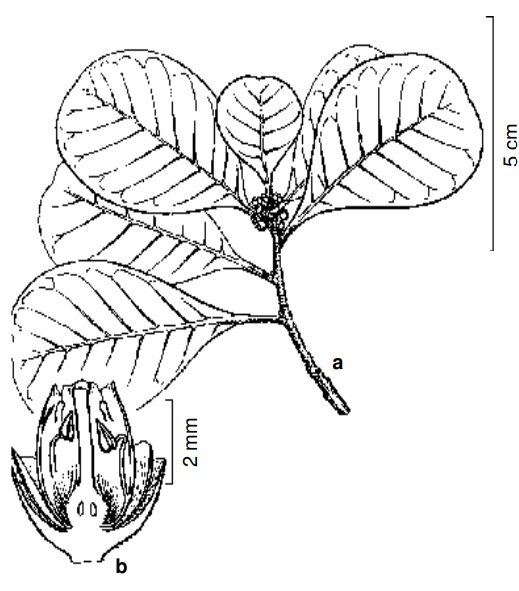
- Achrouteria pomifera

Scientific classification
- Kingdom: Plantae
- Clade: Tracheophytes
- Clade: Angiosperms
- Clade: Eudicots
- Clade: Asterids
- Order: Ericales
- Family: Sapotaceae
- Subfamily: Chrysophylloideae
- Genus: Achrouteria; Eyma

Species
- 3; see text

= Achrouteria =

Genus of flowering plants

Achrouteria is a genus of flowering plants in the family Sapotaceae. It includes three species native to tropical South America.

- Achrouteria durifructa W.A.Rodrigues – French Guiana and northern Brazil
- Achrouteria eximia (Ducke) Swenson – northern Brazil, French Guiana, and Suriname
- Achrouteria pomifera Eyma – Peru, Ecuador, Colombia, Venezuela, the Guianas, and northern Brazil
