= Chrysophyllum eximium =

Scientific classification
- Kingdom: Plantae
- Clade: Embryophytes
- Clade: Tracheophytes
- Clade: Spermatophytes
- Clade: Angiosperms
- Clade: Eudicots
- Clade: Asterids
- Order: Ericales
- Family: Sapotaceae
- Genus: Chrysophyllum
- Species: C. eximium

Binomial name
- Chrysophyllum eximium Ducke

Synonyms
- Chrysophyllum rufocupreum Ducke; Ecclinusa eximia (Ducke) Cronquist; Ecclinusa rufocuprea (Ducke) Cronquist

Species of flowering plant

Chrysophyllum eximium is a tree in the family Sapotaceae, native to tropical South America.

== Description ==
Chrysophyllum eximium grows up to 20 metres (70 ft) tall, with a trunk diameter of up to 35 cm (14 in). Its obovate to oblanceolate leaves measure up to 20 cm (8 in) long. Fascicles feature up to 10 greenish-white flowers. The fruits measure up to 5 cm (2 in) long.

== Distribution and habitat ==
Chrysophyllum eximium is native to Suriname and northern Brazil. Its habitat is in swamp forest and other areas subject to flooding.
