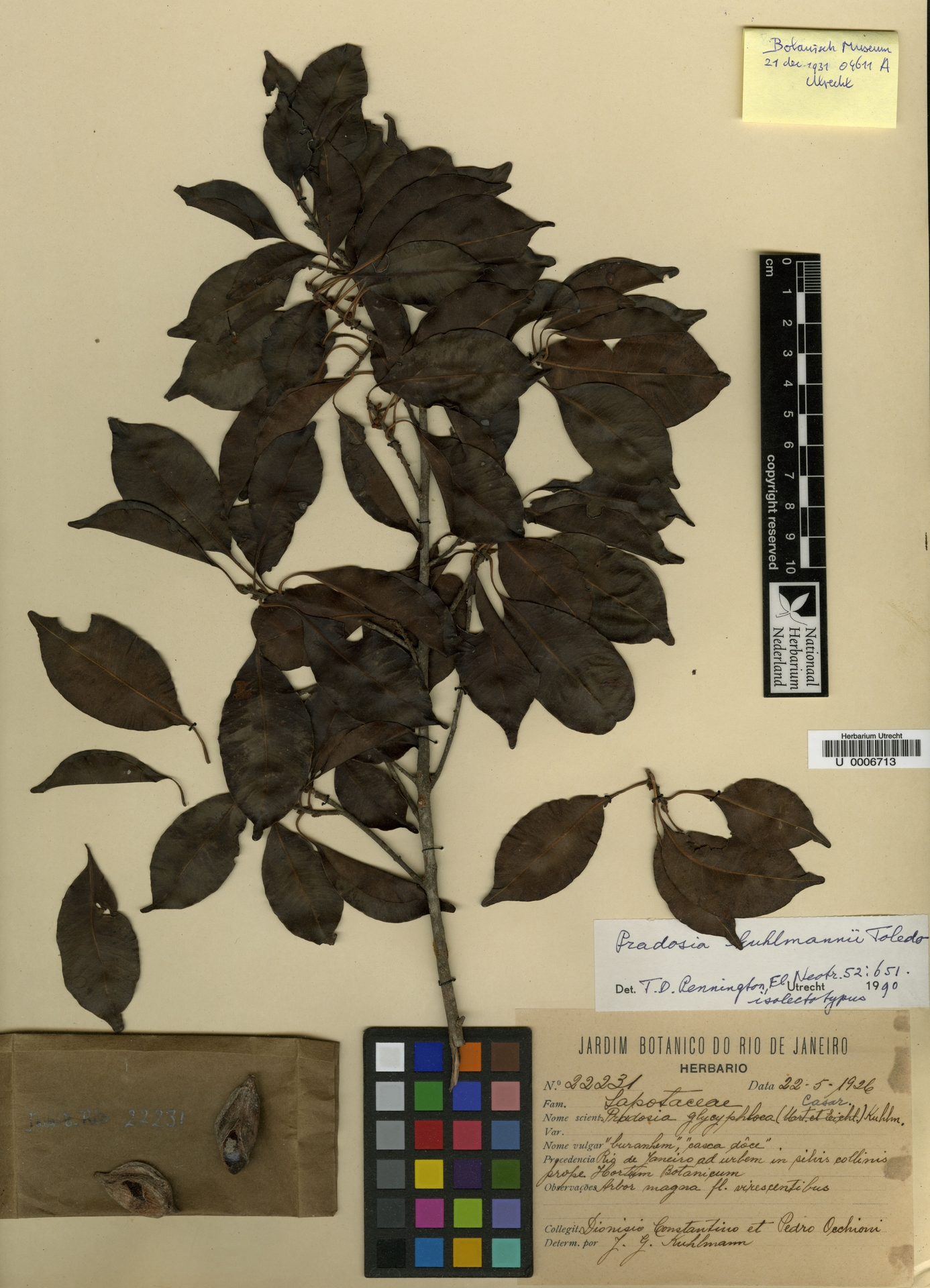

Conservation status
- Endangered (IUCN 2.3)

Scientific classification
- Kingdom: Plantae
- Clade: Tracheophytes
- Clade: Angiosperms
- Clade: Eudicots
- Clade: Asterids
- Order: Ericales
- Family: Sapotaceae
- Genus: Pradosia
- Species: P. kuhlmannii

Binomial name
- Pradosia kuhlmannii Toledo

= Pradosia kuhlmannii =

Species of flowering plant

Pradosia kuhlmannii is a species of plant in the family Sapotaceae. It is endemic to Brazil. It is threatened by habitat loss.

== Taxonomy ==
Pradosia grisebachii and Ecclinusa grisebachii are synonyms for this species.
