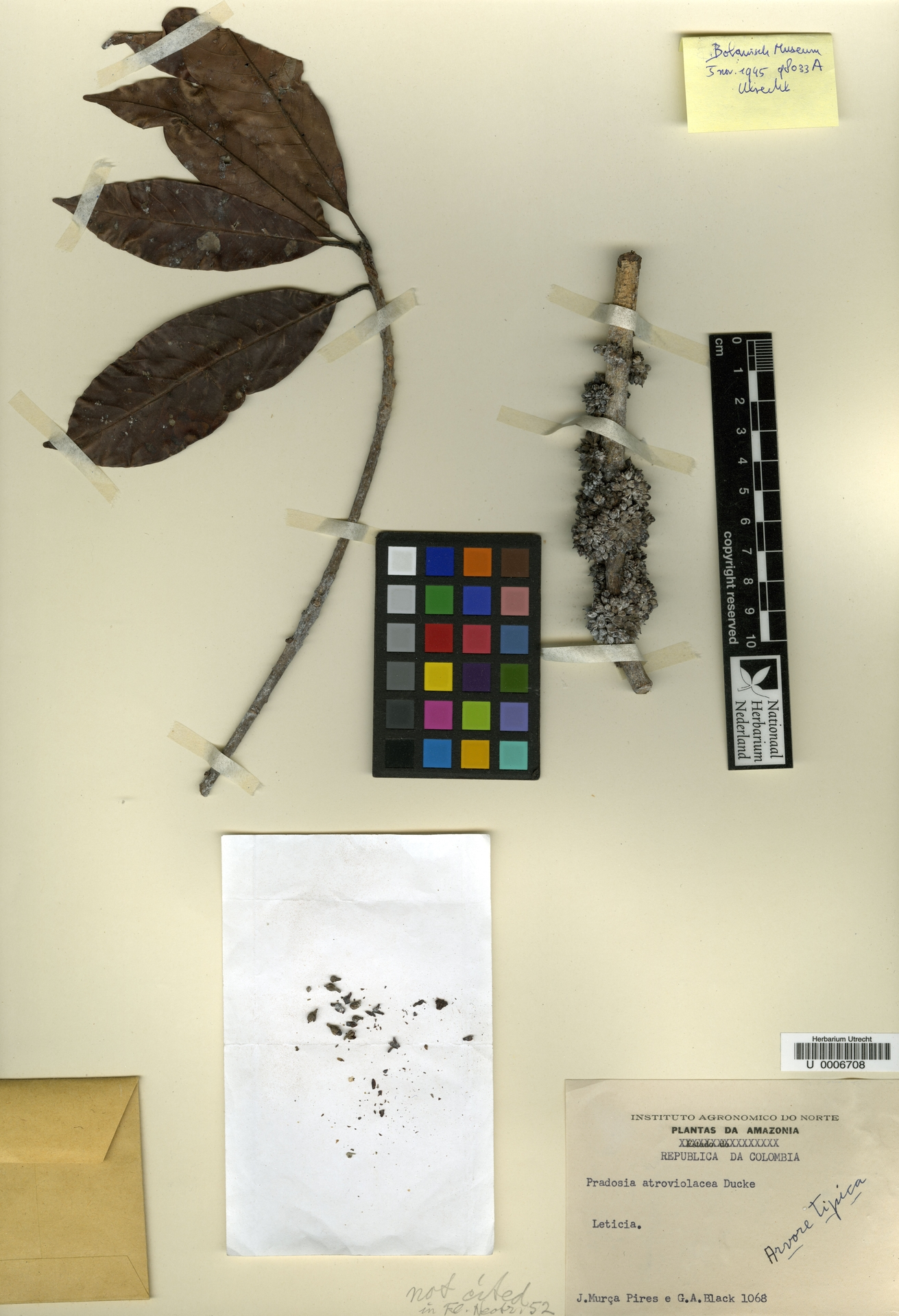

Conservation status
- Near Threatened (IUCN 2.3)

Scientific classification
- Kingdom: Plantae
- Clade: Tracheophytes
- Clade: Angiosperms
- Clade: Eudicots
- Clade: Asterids
- Order: Ericales
- Family: Sapotaceae
- Genus: Pradosia
- Species: P. atroviolacea

Binomial name
- Pradosia atroviolacea Ducke

= Pradosia atroviolacea =

Species of flowering plant

Pradosia atroviolacea is a species of plant in the family Sapotaceae. It is found in Brazil, Colombia, and Peru.
