= Pradosia verticillata =

Conservation status
- Data Deficient (IUCN 3.1)

Scientific classification
- Kingdom: Plantae
- Clade: Tracheophytes
- Clade: Angiosperms
- Clade: Eudicots
- Clade: Asterids
- Order: Ericales
- Family: Sapotaceae
- Genus: Pradosia
- Species: P. verticillata

Binomial name
- Pradosia verticillata Ducke

Species of flowering plant

Pradosia verticillata is a species of plant in the family Sapotaceae. It is found in Brazil and French Guiana.
