= Pradosia montana =

Conservation status
- Vulnerable (IUCN 2.3)

Scientific classification
- Kingdom: Plantae
- Clade: Tracheophytes
- Clade: Angiosperms
- Clade: Eudicots
- Clade: Asterids
- Order: Ericales
- Family: Sapotaceae
- Genus: Pradosia
- Species: P. montana

Binomial name
- Pradosia montana T.D.Penn.

Species of flowering plant

Pradosia montana is a species of plant in the family Sapotaceae. It is a tree and grows well in wet, tropical biomes. It is endemic to Ecuador. The Latin specific epithet montana refers to mountains or coming from mountains.
