= Ragala (plant) =

Scientific classification
- Kingdom: Plantae
- Clade: Tracheophytes
- Clade: Angiosperms
- Clade: Eudicots
- Clade: Asterids
- Order: Ericales
- Family: Sapotaceae
- Subfamily: Chrysophylloideae
- Genus: Ragala; Pierre

Species
- 4; see text

Genus of flowering plants

Ragala is a genus of flowering plants in the family Sapotaceae. It includes four species native to northern South America, including Colombia, Venezuela, the Guianas, northern Brazil, and Peru.

- Ragala bombycina (T.D.Penn.) Swenson
- Ragala sanguinolenta Pierre
- Ragala scalaris (T.D.Penn.) Swenson
- Ragala ucuquirana-branca (Aubrév. & Pellegr.) W.A.Rodrigues
