= Chrysophyllum wilsonii =

Conservation status
- Endangered (IUCN 3.1)

Scientific classification
- Kingdom: Plantae
- Clade: Tracheophytes
- Clade: Angiosperms
- Clade: Eudicots
- Clade: Asterids
- Order: Ericales
- Family: Sapotaceae
- Genus: Chrysophyllum
- Species: C. wilsonii

Binomial name
- Chrysophyllum wilsonii T.D.Penn.

Species of flowering plant

Chrysophyllum wilsonii is a tree in the family Sapotaceae, native to Brazil.

== Description ==
Chrysophyllum wilsonii grows up to 40 metres (130 ft) tall, with a trunk diameter of up to 85 cm (30 in). It has buttresses up to 2 m (7 ft) high. The elliptic or oblanceolate leaves measure up to 15 cm (6 in) long. Fascicles feature up to ten yellow-green flowers. The roundish fruits ripen to yellow and measure up to 5 cm (2 in) in diameter.

== Distribution and habitat ==
Chrysophyllum wilsonii is endemic to Brazil, where it is confined to the forest reserves of the Biological Dynamics of Forest Fragments Project near Manaus, in Amazonas state. Its habitat is in terra firme forest (not subject to river flooding), at altitudes of 50–125 m (200–400 ft).

== Conservation ==
Chrysophyllum wilsonii has been assessed as endangered on the IUCN Red List. It is threatened by population growth in the area, leading to residential development in its habitat. It is also threatened by deforestation for cattle farming. Water pollution by heavy metals from urban landfills poses a threat to the species.
