= Chrysophyllum paranaense =

Conservation status
- Least Concern (IUCN 3.1)

Scientific classification
- Kingdom: Plantae
- Clade: Embryophytes
- Clade: Tracheophytes
- Clade: Spermatophytes
- Clade: Angiosperms
- Clade: Eudicots
- Clade: Asterids
- Order: Ericales
- Family: Sapotaceae
- Genus: Chrysophyllum
- Species: C. paranaense

Binomial name
- Chrysophyllum paranaense T.D.Penn.

Species of tree

Chrysophyllum paranaense is a tree in the family Sapotaceae, native to Brazil.

== Description ==
Chrysophyllum paranaense grows up to 16 metres (50 ft) tall. The trunk has a diameter up to 35 cm (14 in). The species is locally used for its timber and fruit.

== Distribution and habitat ==
Chrysophyllum paranaense is native to the Brazilian states of São Paulo, Paraná and Santa Catarina. Its habitat is in lowland coastal forests.
