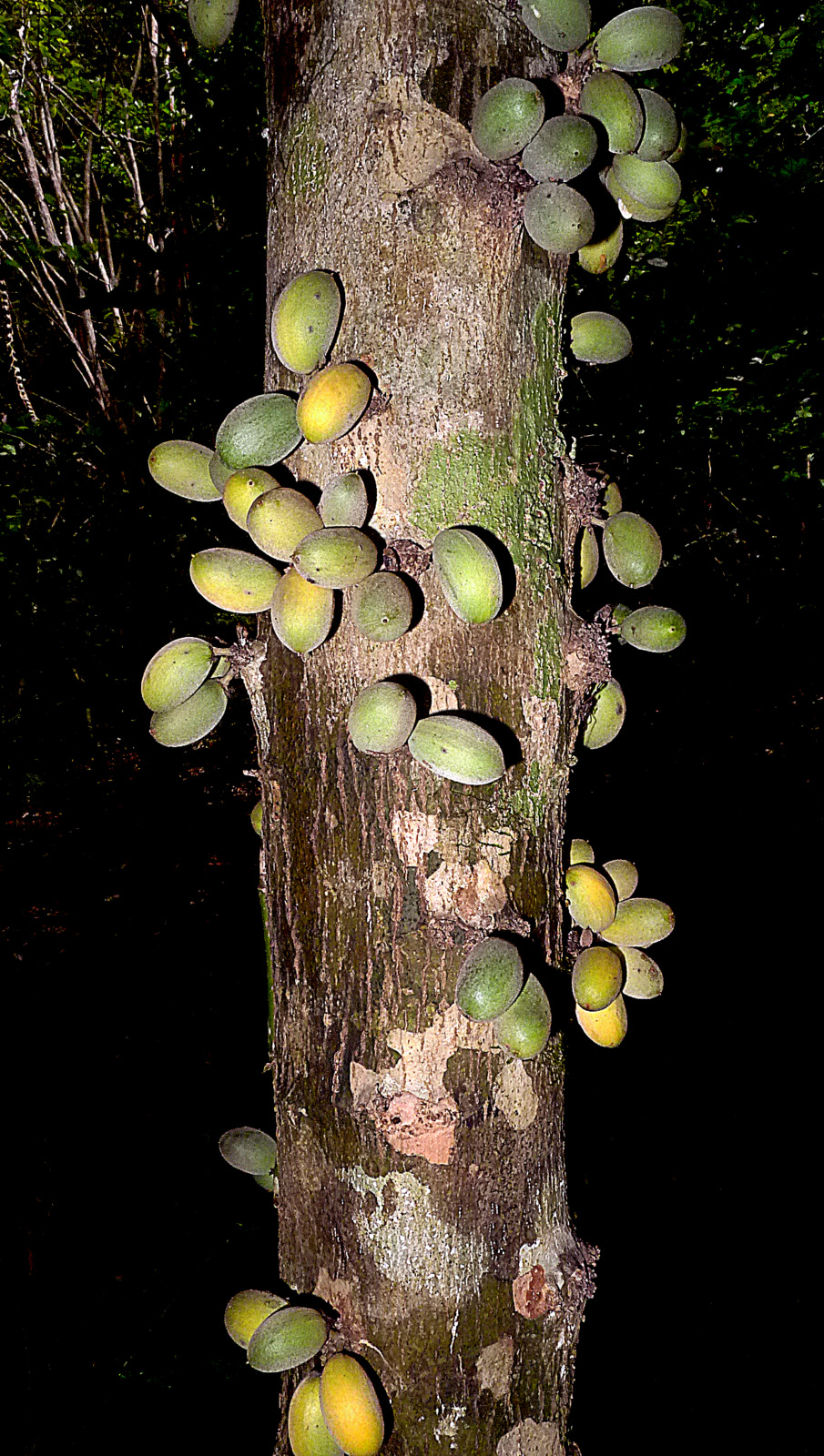
- Pradosia lactescens

Scientific classification
- Kingdom: Plantae
- Clade: Embryophytes
- Clade: Tracheophytes
- Clade: Spermatophytes
- Clade: Angiosperms
- Clade: Eudicots
- Clade: Asterids
- Order: Ericales
- Family: Sapotaceae
- Subfamily: Chrysophylloideae
- Genus: Pradosia; Liais

Synonyms
- Pouteria section Pradosia (Liais) Eyma; Glycoxylon Ducke; Neopometia Aubrév.; Pometia Vell. 1825, illegitimate homonym, not J.R. Forst. & G. Forst. 1775; Voyara Aubl.

= Pradosia =

Genus of plants in the family Sapotaceae

Pradosia is a genus of plants in the family Sapotaceae described as a genus in 1872.

Most of the species of Pradosia are native to Central and South America, but a few occur in Trinidad and in tropical Africa.

== Species ==
26 species are accepted.

1. Pradosia argentea (Kunth) T.D.Penn. – Peru
2. Pradosia beardii (Monach.) T.D.Penn. – Trinidad, Venezuela, Guyana
3. Pradosia brevipes (Pierre) T.D.Penn. – Brazil, Paraguay
4. Pradosia caracasana (Pittier) T.D.Penn – Trinidad, Venezuela, Colombia
5. Pradosia cochlearia (Lecomte) T.D.Penn. – French Guiana, N Brazil
6. Pradosia colombiana (Standl.) T.D.Penn. ex T.J.Ayers & Boufford – Venezuela, Colombia
7. Pradosia cuatrecasasii (Aubrév.) T.D.Penn. – Colombia
8. Pradosia decipiens Ducke – Amazonas
9. †Pradosia glaziovii (Pierre) T.D.Penn. (synonym Pradosia verrucosa Ducke) – Pernambuco to Rio de Janeiro
10. Pradosia golfodulcensis Aguilar & D.Santam. – Costa Rica
11. Pradosia granulosa Pires & T.D.Penn. – Pará, Maranhão
12. Pradosia grisebachii (Pierre) T.D.Penn. (synonym Pradosia atroviolacea Ducke) – Costa Rica to Trinidad, northern Brazil, and northern Peru
13. Pradosia huberi (Ducke) Ducke – French Guiana, Pará
14. Pradosia kuhlmannii Toledo – Rio de Janeiro
15. Pradosia lactescens (Vell.) Radlk. – Brazil
16. Pradosia lahoziana Terra-Araujo – Amazonas
17. Pradosia longipedicellata Alves-Araújo & M.Alves – Bahia
18. Pradosia montana T.D.Penn. – Ecuador
19. †Pradosia mutisii Cronquist – Colombia, Ecuador
20. Pradosia ptychandra (Eyma) T.D.Penn. – Suriname, French Guiana
21. Pradosia restingae Terra-Araujo – Brazil (Rio Grande do Norte)
22. Pradosia schomburgkiana (A.DC.) Cronquist – Northern South America
23. Pradosia spinosa Ewango & Breteler – Cameroon, Republic of the Congo, Gabon, Democratic Republic of the Congo
24. Pradosia subverticillata Ducke – Amazonas, Pará
25. Pradosia surinamensis (Eyma) T.D.Penn. – Venezuela, Guianas, Northern Brazil
26. Pradosia verticillata Ducke – Amazonas, French Guiana
