= Pradosia glaziovii =

Conservation status
- Extinct (IUCN 2.3)

Scientific classification
- Kingdom: Plantae
- Clade: Tracheophytes
- Clade: Angiosperms
- Clade: Eudicots
- Clade: Asterids
- Order: Ericales
- Family: Sapotaceae
- Genus: Pradosia
- Species: †P. glaziovii

Binomial name
- †Pradosia glaziovii (Pierre) T.D.Penn.

Synonyms
- Ecclinusa glaziovii Pierre; Pradosia verrucosa Ducke

Extinct species of flowering plant

Pradosia glaziovii was a species of plant in the family Sapotaceae. It was endemic to eastern Brazil. According to the IUCN Red List, the species became extinct due to habitat loss. However the taxon synonym Pradosia verrucosa is assessed as critically endangered.
