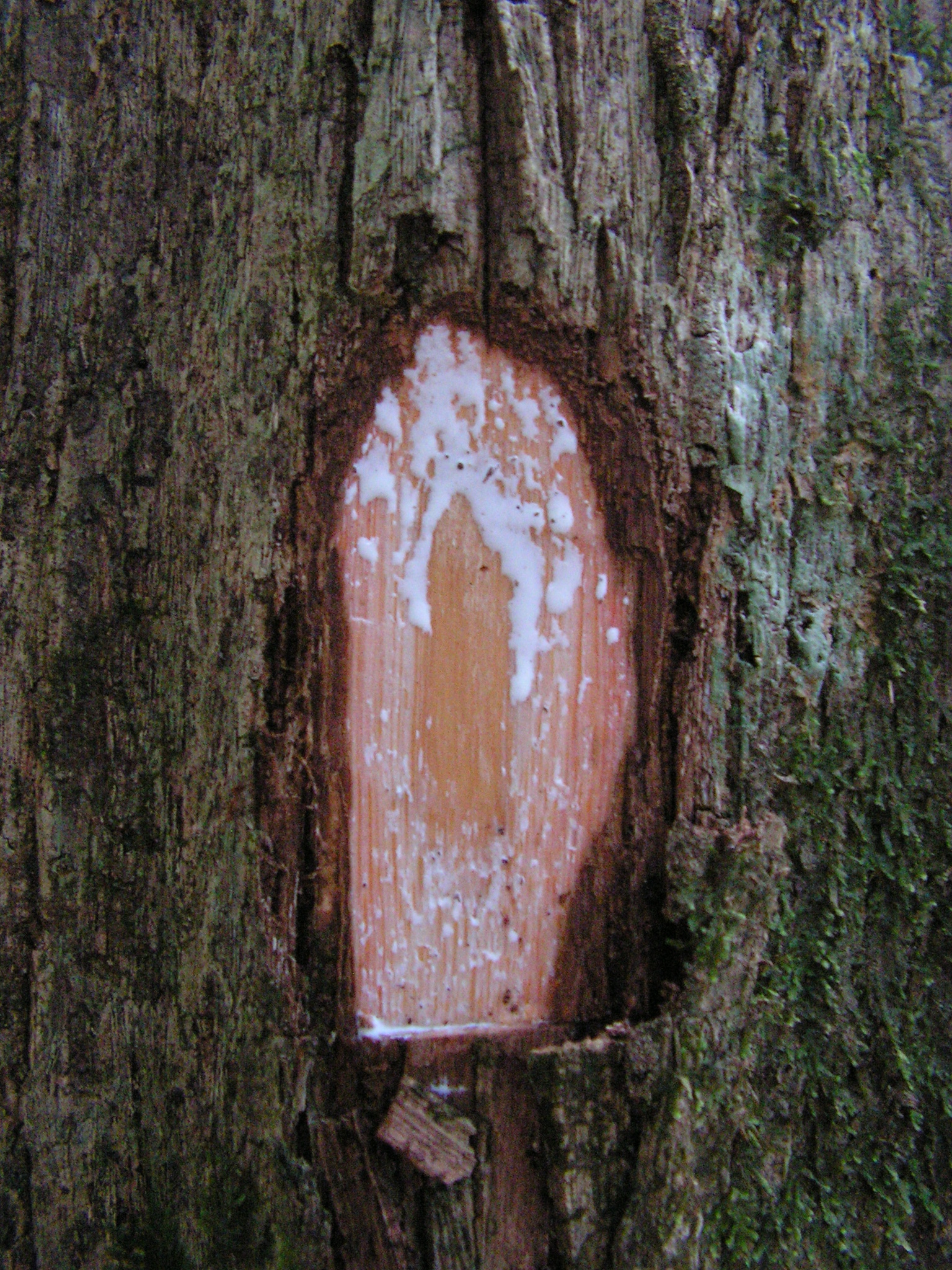
- Bark

Conservation status
- Vulnerable (IUCN 2.3)

Scientific classification
- Kingdom: Plantae
- Clade: Tracheophytes
- Clade: Angiosperms
- Clade: Eudicots
- Clade: Asterids
- Order: Ericales
- Family: Sapotaceae
- Genus: Chrysophyllum
- Species: C. splendens

Binomial name
- Chrysophyllum splendens Spreng.

Synonyms
- Chrysophyllum amplifolium A.DC.; Chrysophyllum olfersii Klotzsch ex Miq.; Chrysophyllum pulcherrimum Mart. & Eichler; Villocuspis splendens (Spreng.) Aubrév. & Pellegr.

= Chrysophyllum splendens =

Species of flowering plant

Chrysophyllum splendens is a plant in the family Sapotaceae, native to Brazil.

== Description ==
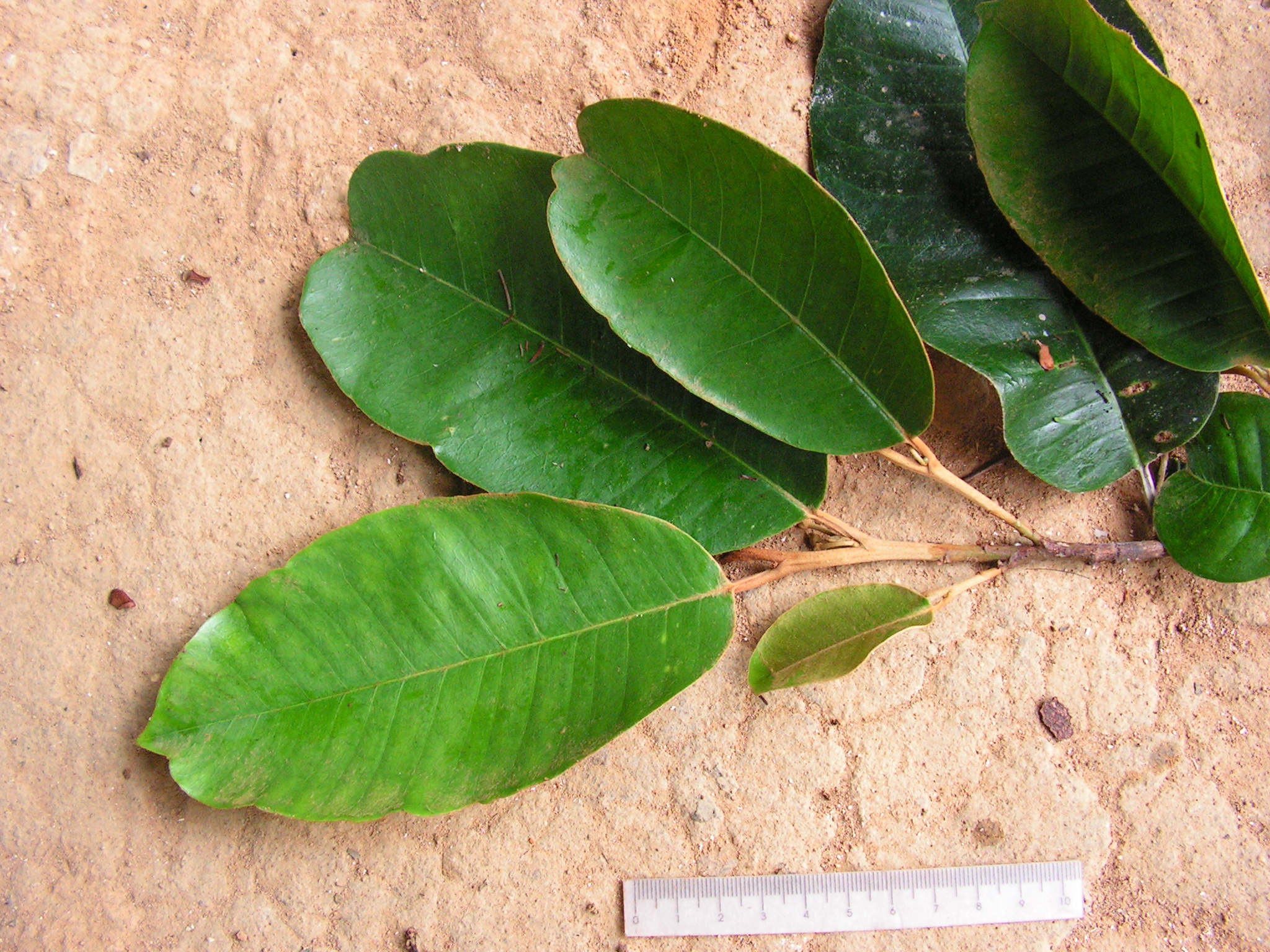
Leaves

Chrysophyllum splendens grows as a shrub or tree up to 18 metres (60 ft) tall. The trunk has a diameter up to 50 cm (20 in). The timber is locally used in construction and for furniture.

== Distribution and habitat ==
Chrysophyllum splendens is native to the Brazilian states of Bahia, Espírito Santo, Pernambuco. Its habitat is in hilly rainforest, at altitudes to 100 m (300 ft).
