= Chrysophyllum sparsiflorum =

Conservation status
- Least Concern (IUCN 3.1)

Scientific classification
- Kingdom: Plantae
- Clade: Tracheophytes
- Clade: Angiosperms
- Clade: Eudicots
- Clade: Asterids
- Order: Ericales
- Family: Sapotaceae
- Genus: Chrysophyllum
- Species: C. sparsiflorum

Binomial name
- Chrysophyllum sparsiflorum Klotzsch ex Miq.

Synonyms
- Chrysophyllum steyermarkii Monach.

Species of flowering plant

Chrysophyllum sparsiflorum is a tree in the family Sapotaceae, native to South America.

== Description ==
Chrysophyllum sparsiflorum grows up to 40 metres (130 ft) tall, with a trunk diameter of up to 40 cm (16 in).The elliptic leaves measure up to 14 cm (6 in) long. Fascicles feature up to 25 green flowers. The fruits ripen to yellow and measure up to 3 cm (1.2 in) long.

== Distribution and habitat ==
Chrysophyllum sparsiflorum is native to Bolivia, Brazil, Guyana and Venezuela. Its habitat is in lowland rainforest.
