= Chrysophyllum aulacocarpum =

Conservation status
- Critically endangered, possibly extinct (IUCN 3.1)

Scientific classification
- Kingdom: Plantae
- Clade: Embryophytes
- Clade: Tracheophytes
- Clade: Spermatophytes
- Clade: Angiosperms
- Clade: Eudicots
- Clade: Asterids
- Order: Ericales
- Family: Sapotaceae
- Genus: Chrysophyllum
- Species: C. aulacocarpum

Binomial name
- Chrysophyllum aulacocarpum Ernst

Species of flowering plant

Chrysophyllum aulacocarpum is a tree in the family Sapotaceae, native to Venezuela.

== Distribution and habitat ==
Chrysophyllum aulacocarpum is endemic to Venezuela, where it is considered to be confined to the area of Los Teques in Miranda state. Its last-known habitat was in deciduous or cloud forests at an elevation of around 1,200 metres (4,000 ft).

== Conservation ==
Chrysophyllum aulacocarpum has been assessed as Critically Endangered (possibly extinct) on the IUCN Red List. The species is only known from its initial identification in 1874. Given that its habitat of that time is now in the urban area of Los Teques, it is at best threatened by urban development.
