= Chrysophyllum inornatum =

Conservation status
- Conservation Dependent (IUCN 2.3)

Scientific classification
- Kingdom: Plantae
- Clade: Tracheophytes
- Clade: Angiosperms
- Clade: Eudicots
- Clade: Asterids
- Order: Ericales
- Family: Sapotaceae
- Genus: Chrysophyllum
- Species: C. inornatum

Binomial name
- Chrysophyllum inornatum Mart.

Synonyms
- Chrysophyllum dusenii Cronquist

Species of flowering plant

Chrysophyllum inornatum is a plant in the family Sapotaceae, native to Brazil.

== Description ==
Chrysophyllum inornatum grows as a shrub or tree, up to 12 m (40 ft) tall, with a trunk diameter up to 45 cm (18 in). The species is locally harvested for its timber and fruit.

== Distribution and habitat ==
Chrysophyllum inornatum is native to southern Brazil. Its habitat is by rivers in coastal forests.
