= Chrysophyllum mexicanum =

Conservation status
- Least Concern (IUCN 3.1)

Scientific classification
- Kingdom: Plantae
- Clade: Embryophytes
- Clade: Tracheophytes
- Clade: Spermatophytes
- Clade: Angiosperms
- Clade: Eudicots
- Clade: Asterids
- Order: Ericales
- Family: Sapotaceae
- Genus: Chrysophyllum
- Species: C. mexicanum

Binomial name
- Chrysophyllum mexicanum Brandegee

Synonyms
- Cynodendron mexicanum (Brandegee) Baehni; Micropholis sericea L.O.Williams

Species of flowering plant

Chrysophyllum mexicanum is a plant in the family Sapotaceae, native to Mexico and Central America.

== Description ==
Chrysophyllum mexicanum grows as a shrub or tree up to 23 m (75 ft) tall. The trunk has a diameter of up to 50 cm (20 in).

== Distribution and habitat ==
Chrysophyllum mexicanum is native to an area from northern Mexico to Nicaragua. Its habitat is in forests, particularly on rocky hillsides, at altitudes up to 1,700 m (5,600 ft).
