= Chrysophyllum lucentifolium =

Conservation status
- Least Concern (IUCN 3.1)

Scientific classification
- Kingdom: Plantae
- Clade: Tracheophytes
- Clade: Angiosperms
- Clade: Eudicots
- Clade: Asterids
- Order: Ericales
- Family: Sapotaceae
- Genus: Chrysophyllum
- Species: C. lucentifolium

Binomial name
- Chrysophyllum lucentifolium Cronquist

Species of flowering plant

Chrysophyllum lucentifolium is a plant in the family Sapotaceae, native to Central and South America.

== Description ==
Chrysophyllum lucentifolium grows as a shrub or tree. The species is harvested for its timber.

== Distribution and habitat ==
Chrysophyllum lucentifolium is native to an area from Costa Rica in the north to southeastern Brazil. It grows in a variety of habitats from forests to savanna.
