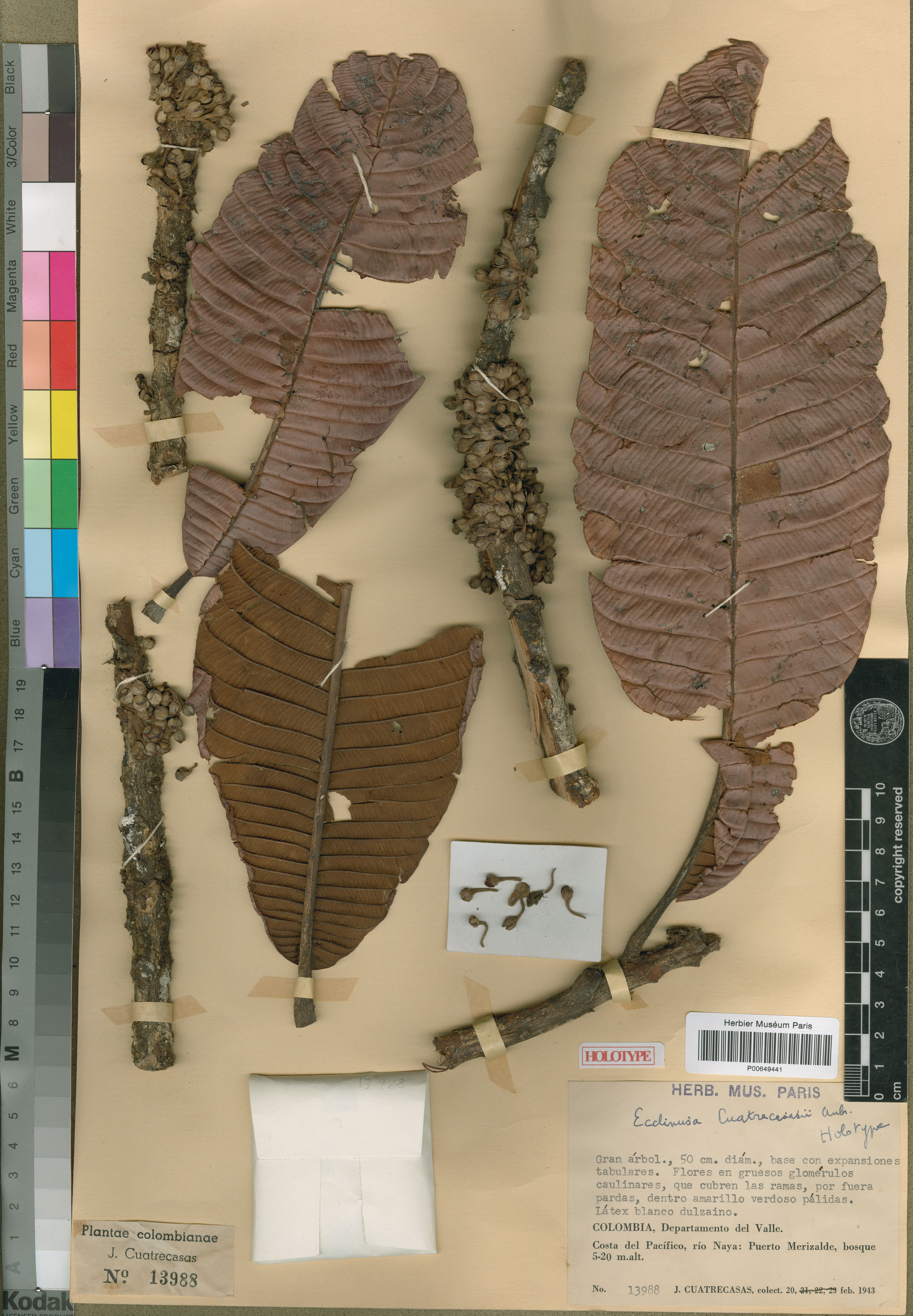

Conservation status
- Least Concern (IUCN 3.1)

Scientific classification
- Kingdom: Plantae
- Clade: Tracheophytes
- Clade: Angiosperms
- Clade: Eudicots
- Clade: Asterids
- Order: Ericales
- Family: Sapotaceae
- Genus: Pradosia
- Species: P. cuatrecasasii

Binomial name
- Pradosia cuatrecasasii (Aubrév.) T.D.Penn.

= Pradosia cuatrecasasii =

Species of flowering plant

Pradosia cuatrecasasii is a species of plant in the family Sapotaceae. It is endemic to Colombia.
