= Pradosia argentea =

Conservation status
- Critically Endangered (IUCN 3.1)

Scientific classification
- Kingdom: Plantae
- Clade: Tracheophytes
- Clade: Angiosperms
- Clade: Eudicots
- Clade: Asterids
- Order: Ericales
- Family: Sapotaceae
- Genus: Pradosia
- Species: P. argentea

Binomial name
- Pradosia argentea (Kunth) T.D.Penn.

Species of plant

Pradosia argentea is a species of plant in the family Sapotaceae. It is endemic to Peru.
