= Pradosia subverticillata =

Conservation status
- Vulnerable (IUCN 2.3)

Scientific classification
- Kingdom: Plantae
- Clade: Tracheophytes
- Clade: Angiosperms
- Clade: Eudicots
- Clade: Asterids
- Order: Ericales
- Family: Sapotaceae
- Genus: Pradosia
- Species: P. subverticillata

Binomial name
- Pradosia subverticillata Ducke

Species of flowering plant

Pradosia subverticillata is a species of plant in the family Sapotaceae. It is endemic to Brazil and threatened by habitat loss.
