= Chrysophyllum flexuosum =

Conservation status
- Least Concern (IUCN 3.1)

Scientific classification
- Kingdom: Plantae
- Clade: Tracheophytes
- Clade: Angiosperms
- Clade: Eudicots
- Clade: Asterids
- Order: Ericales
- Family: Sapotaceae
- Genus: Chrysophyllum
- Species: C. flexuosum

Binomial name
- Chrysophyllum flexuosum Mart. (1837)

Synonyms
- Chrysophyllum elegans Raunk. ex Warm.; Chrysophyllum flexuosum var. cuspidatum Miq.; Chrysophyllum flexuosum var. majus Miq.; Chrysophyllum lanceolatum Casar.; Villocuspis elegans (Raunk. ex Warm.) Aubrév. & Pellegr.; Villocuspis flexuosa (Mart.) Aubrév. & Pellegr.

Species of tree

Chrysophyllum flexuosum is a tree species in the family Sapotaceae native to eastern and southern Brazil. It grows up to 9 metres tall in evergreen and semi-deciduous lowland tropical moist forest.

The IUCN Red List assesses the species as least concern.

Triterpenic lactones can be found in the leaves of C. flexuosum.
