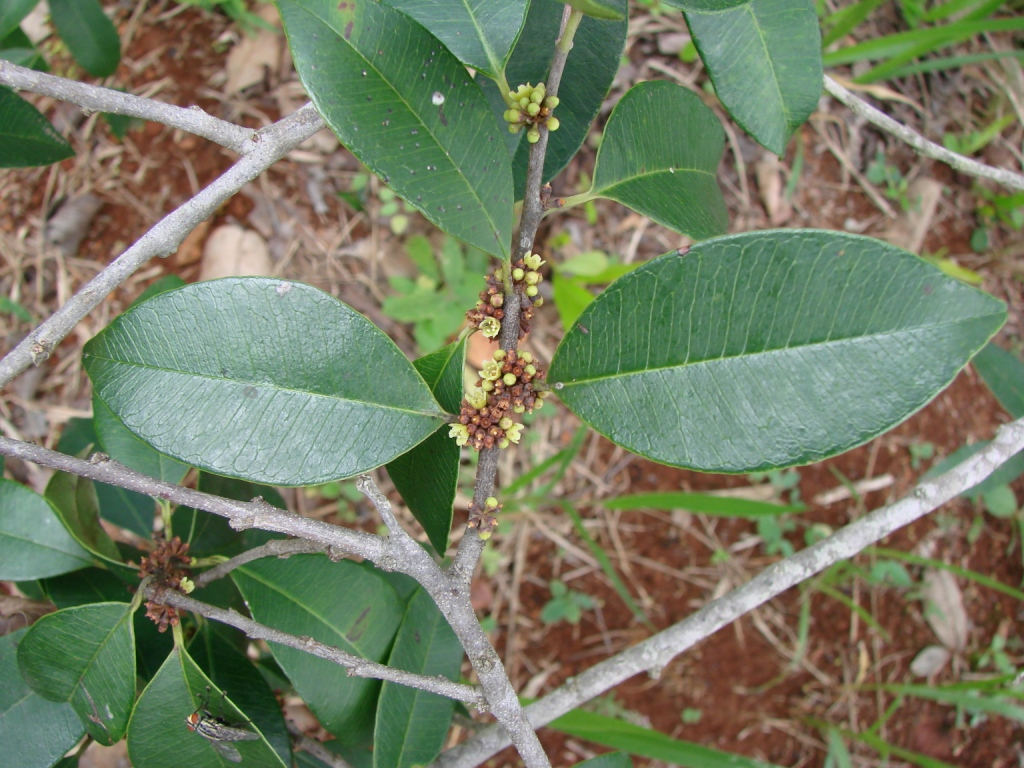
- In Brasília

Conservation status
- Least Concern (IUCN 3.1)

Scientific classification
- Kingdom: Plantae
- Clade: Tracheophytes
- Clade: Angiosperms
- Clade: Eudicots
- Clade: Asterids
- Order: Ericales
- Family: Sapotaceae
- Genus: Chrysophyllum
- Species: C. marginatum

Binomial name
- Chrysophyllum marginatum (Hook. & Arn.) Radlk.

Synonyms
- Myrsine marginata Hook. & Arn.; Cynodendron marginatum (Hook. & Arn.) Baehni

= Chrysophyllum marginatum =

Species of flowering plant

Chrysophyllum marginatum is a tree in the family Sapotaceae, native to South America.

== Description ==
Chrysophyllum marginatum grows up to 10 metres (33 ft) tall, with a trunk diameter up to 40 cm (16 in). It is a suitable species for reforestation.

== Distribution and habitat ==
Chrysophyllum marginatum is native to Argentina, Bolivia, Brazil, Paraguay and Uruguay. Its habitat is in woodlands near rivers or in mountainous areas.
