= Cornuella =

Scientific classification
- Domain: Eukaryota
- Kingdom: Animalia
- Phylum: Mollusca
- Class: Cephalopoda
- Subclass: Nautiloidea
- Order: Nautilida
- Genus: †Cornuella

Extinct genus of molluscs

For the genus of plants, see Cornuella venezuelanensis

Cornuella is an extinct genus of prehistoric nautiloid. The only known species of Cornuella is C. parva. The nautiloids are a subclass of shelled cephalopods that were once diverse and numerous but are now represented by only a handful of species. Cornuella shell fossils are known from several locations in Missouri and throughout the UK, including Scotland. Cornuella's shell was slightly curved and strongly ribbed. The fossils of Cornuella from Missouri are Cambrian in age. Cornuella likely lived either at the surface or the bottom of the water column. It was likely a grazer.

== See also ==
- Nautiloid
  - List of nautiloids
