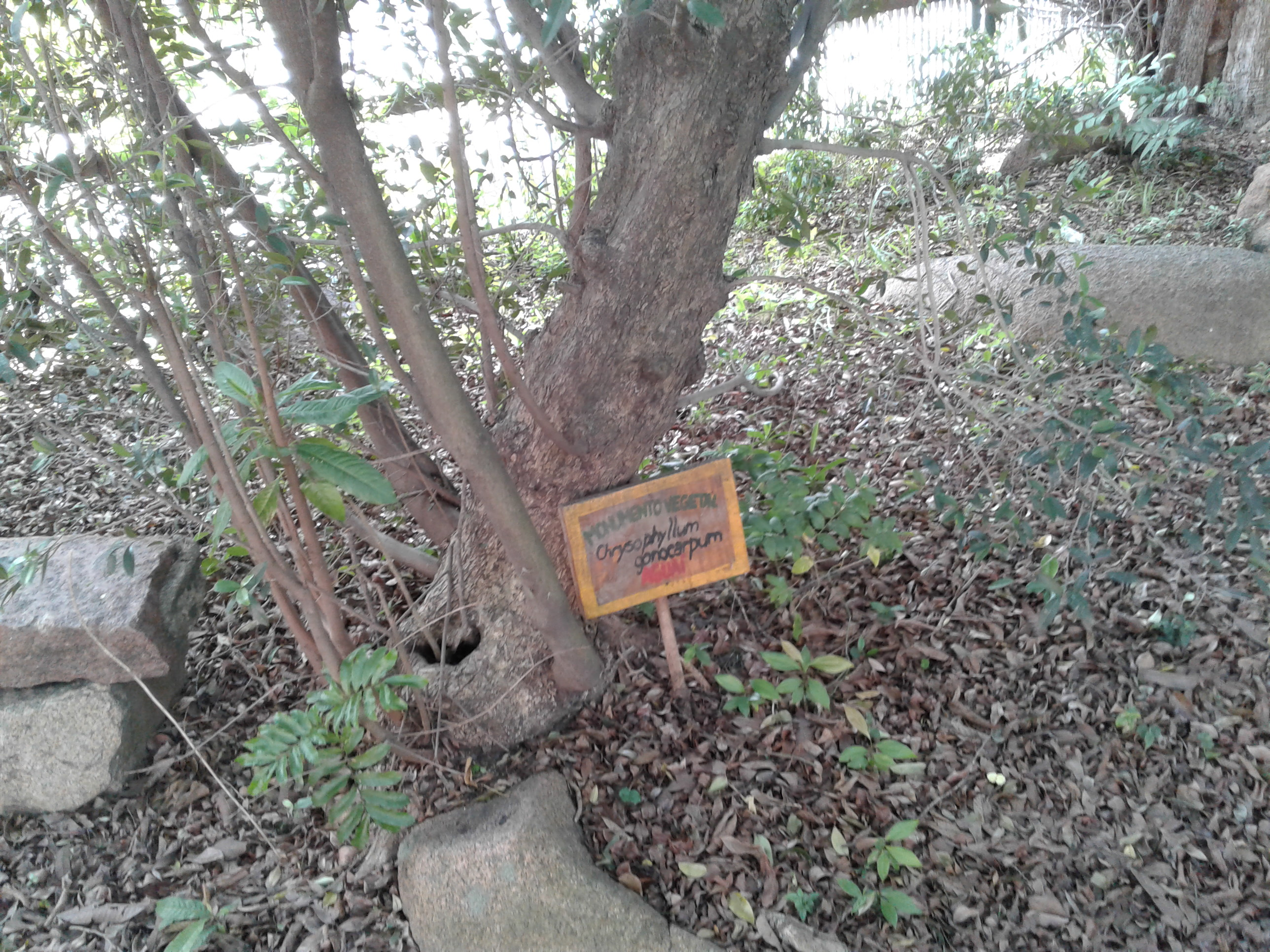

Conservation status
- Least Concern (IUCN 3.1)

Scientific classification
- Kingdom: Plantae
- Clade: Tracheophytes
- Clade: Angiosperms
- Clade: Eudicots
- Clade: Asterids
- Order: Ericales
- Family: Sapotaceae
- Genus: Chrysophyllum
- Species: C. gonocarpum

Binomial name
- Chrysophyllum gonocarpum (Mart. & Eichler) Engl.

Synonyms
- Chloroluma gonocarpa (Mart. & Eichler) Baill. ex Aubrév.; Chrysophyllum cearaense Allemão; Chrysophyllum cysneiri Allemão; Chrysophyllum lucumifolium Griseb.; Chrysophyllum nemorale Rojas Acosta; Chrysophyllum obtusifolium Allemão; Chrysophyllum persicastrum Eichler; Martiusella gonocarpa (Mart. & Eichler) Pierre; Pouteria boliviana (Rusby) Baehni; Sapota gonocarpa Mart. & Eichler; Sideroxylon bolivianum Rusby; Sideroxylon reticulatum Britton

= Chrysophyllum gonocarpum =

Species of flowering plant

Chrysophyllum gonocarpum is a tree in the family Sapotaceae, native to South America.

== Description ==
Chrysophyllum gonocarpum grows up to 20 metres (70 ft) tall, with a trunk diameter up to 80 cm (31 in). The brown to pink wood is used commercially.

== Distribution and habitat ==
Chrysophyllum gonocarpum is native to Argentina, Bolivia, Brazil, Paraguay and Uruguay. Its habitat is in lowland or foothill forests.
