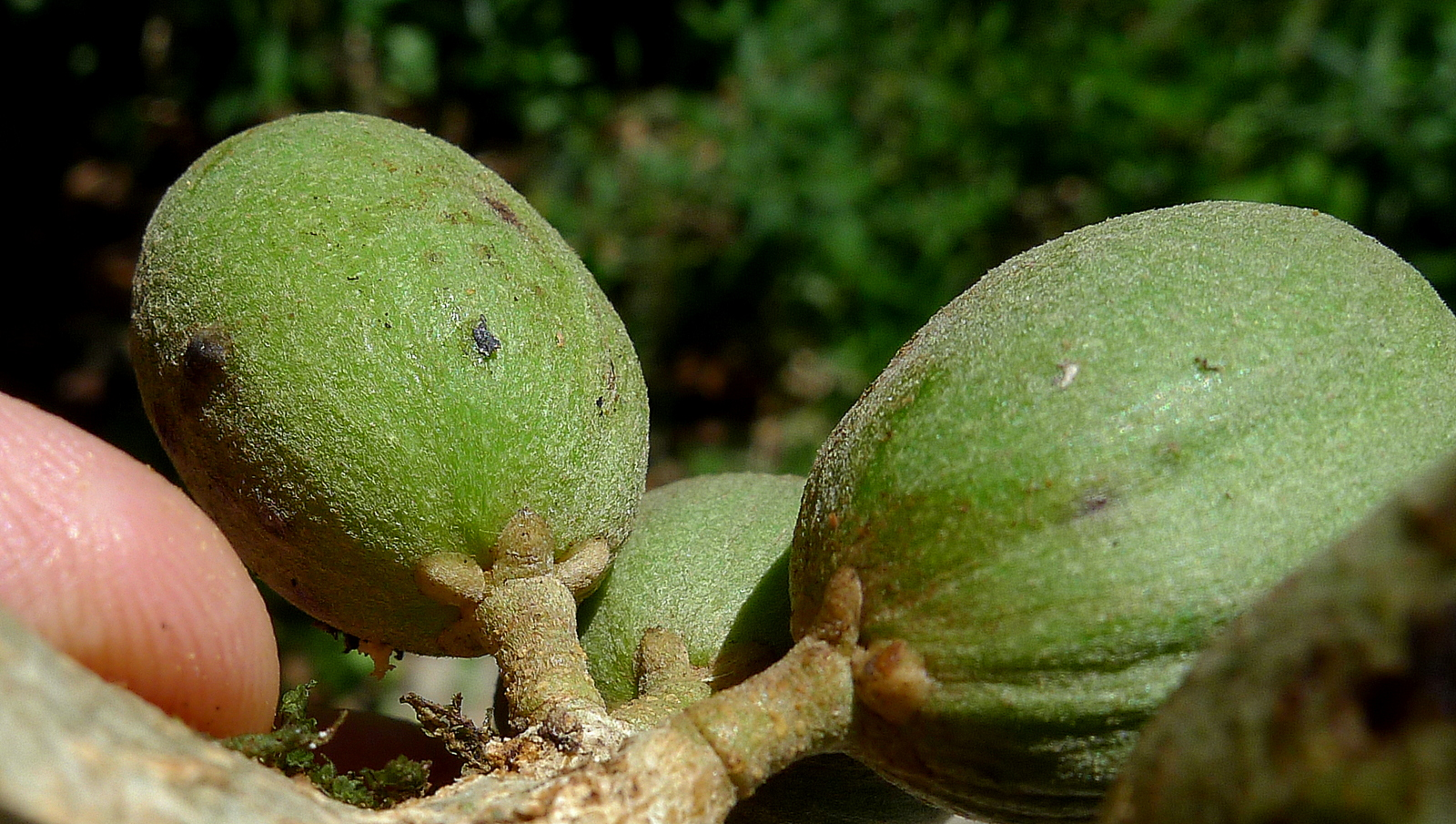

Scientific classification
- Kingdom: Plantae
- Clade: Tracheophytes
- Clade: Angiosperms
- Clade: Eudicots
- Clade: Asterids
- Order: Ericales
- Family: Sapotaceae
- Genus: Pradosia
- Species: P. lactescens

Binomial name
- Pradosia lactescens (Vell.) Radlk.

= Pradosia lactescens =

Species of flowering plant

Pradosia lactescens is a species of large tree in the family Sapotaceae. It is endemic to the Atlantic forests of Brazil, and is most commonly known by the name buranhém. The species is cauliflorous, with red flowers being followed by small, edible, yellow fruit.
