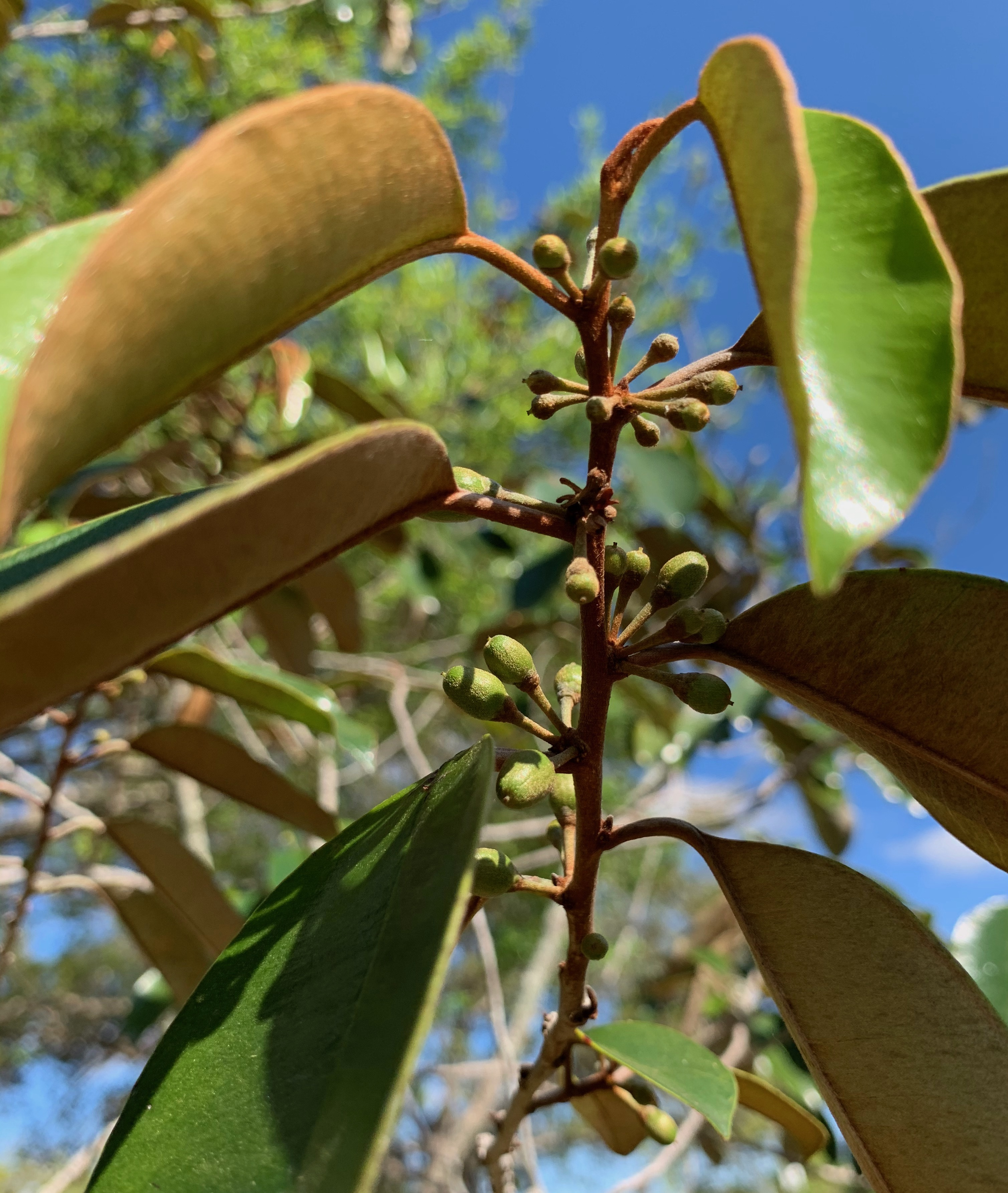
- Leaves and fruits in Florida

Conservation status
- Least Concern (IUCN 3.1)

Scientific classification
- Kingdom: Plantae
- Clade: Tracheophytes
- Clade: Angiosperms
- Clade: Eudicots
- Clade: Asterids
- Order: Ericales
- Family: Sapotaceae
- Genus: Chrysophyllum
- Species: C. oliviforme

Binomial name
- Chrysophyllum oliviforme L.

Synonyms
- Cynodendron oliviforme (L.) Baehni; Dactimala oliviformis (L.) Raf.; Guersentia oliviformis (L.) Raf.

= Chrysophyllum oliviforme =

Species of flowering plant

Chrysophyllum oliviforme, commonly known as the satinleaf, is a medium-sized tree native to Florida, the Bahamas, the Greater Antilles, and Belize. It is also known as damson plum, wild star-apple and saffron-tree. It gets the name "satinleaf" from the distinctive colors of the leaves. The top of the leaf is dark green while the bottom is light brown or copper. This distinctive look makes it a very aesthetically pleasing tree that is commonly used as an ornamental in yards and public spaces.

== Taxonomy ==
The satinleaf was one of the many species described by Linnaeus, appearing for the first time in the tenth edition of his Systema Naturae in 1759.

A combined DNA and morphological study of the subfamily Chrysophylloideae found the two main genera, Chrysophyllum and Pouteria, to be highly polyphyletic, and that C. oliviforme is in a clade with other members of the genus. It is most closely related to C. cainito.

== Description ==
Individuals of the species are generally shrubs or small trees between 3 and 5 m (9.8 and 16.4 ft) in height, but under good growing conditions they can reach up to 10 meters (33 feet) tall. The trunks can be around 30 cm (12 in) in diameter. The bark is thin with fissures and plates. It is gray-brown in color. Typically they have only one trunk. The twigs are thin and brown in color. The branches droop slightly as the tree matures. The leaves are alternate and are a shiny dark green on top and light brown on the bottom. They are simple leaf types with pinnate venation. The leaves are ovate and range in length from 3 to 11 cm (1.2 to 4.3 in). The breadth of the leaves ranges from 2 to 5 cm (0.79 to 1.97 in). The leaves are evergreen so they are present year round. These trees flower all year round in some places, such as Florida, and in other places they only flower between July and October, producing matured fruit in February. Puerto Rico is an example of a place where they only flower part of the year. The flowers are small and creamy yellow in color. They have 5 petals and 5 stamens. The flowers inflorescence is fasciculate. The fruit that form are dark purple when ripe and have a gum-like skin that covers an inner whitish flesh. They resemble an olive in size. The fruits are edible, albeit very chewy. They have several black seeds.

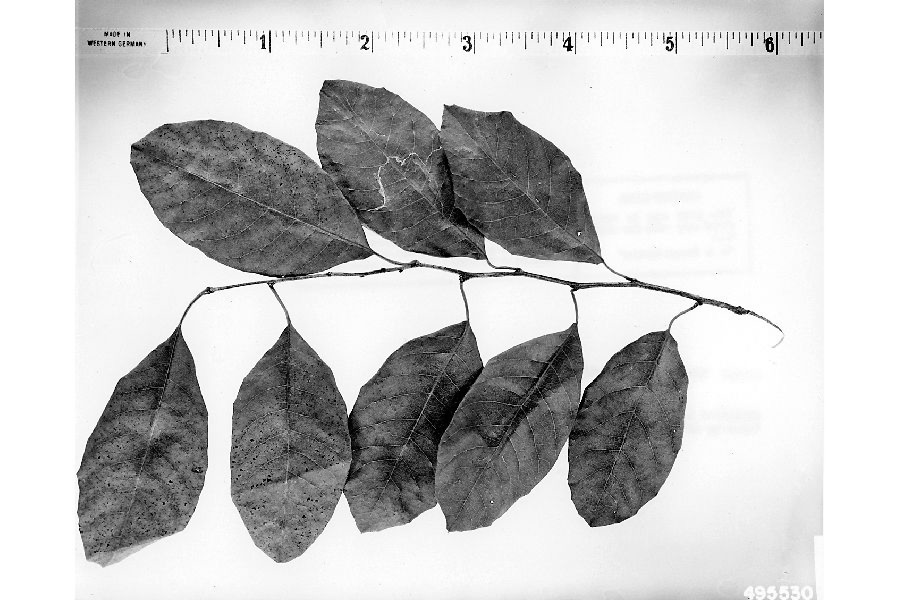
The leaves are ovate with pinnate venation

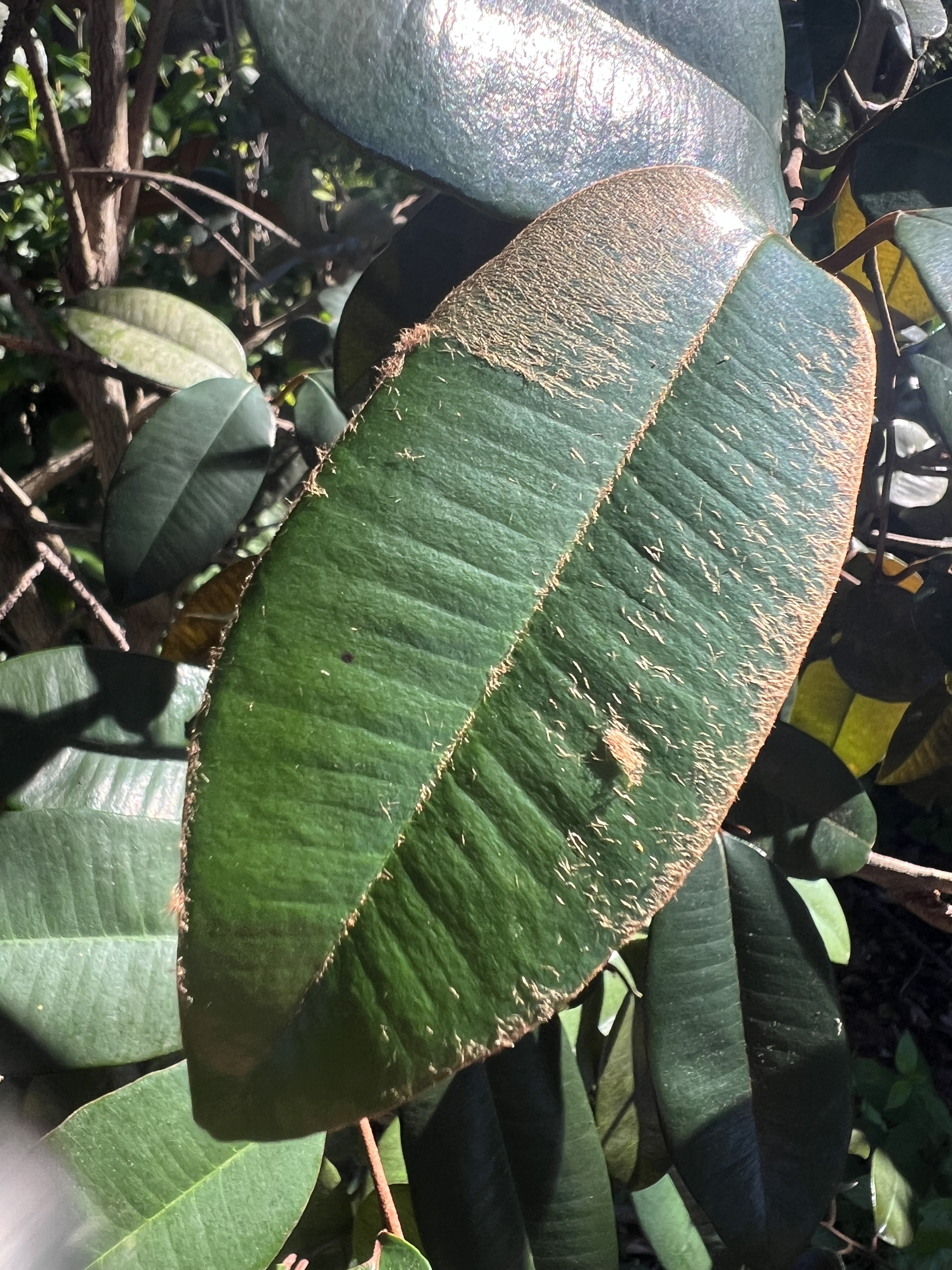
Chrysophyllum oliviforme— top of leaf coated with golden pubescence from underside of leaf above

=== Flowers and fruits ===
The flowers are small, usually about 3 to 5 mm (0.12 to 0.20 in) in diameter, and have a creamy yellow color. They are pollinated by insects. In Florida, the flowers are present all year round and so are the fruit. However, in some places, for example Puerto Rico, the flowers are only present between July and October. The fruit take several months to mature and are usually ripe by February. The fruit are about the same size as an olive and are green as they ripen. Once mature they turn a dark purplish color. There are normally several black seeds per fruit. The seeds are protected by a white fleshy interior surrounded by a rubbery, gum-like covering. When cut, the seeds ooze a milky white liquid. The seeds are dispersed by birds. They eat the fruit and disperse the seeds in their feces. These trees grow at a slow pace throughout their development.

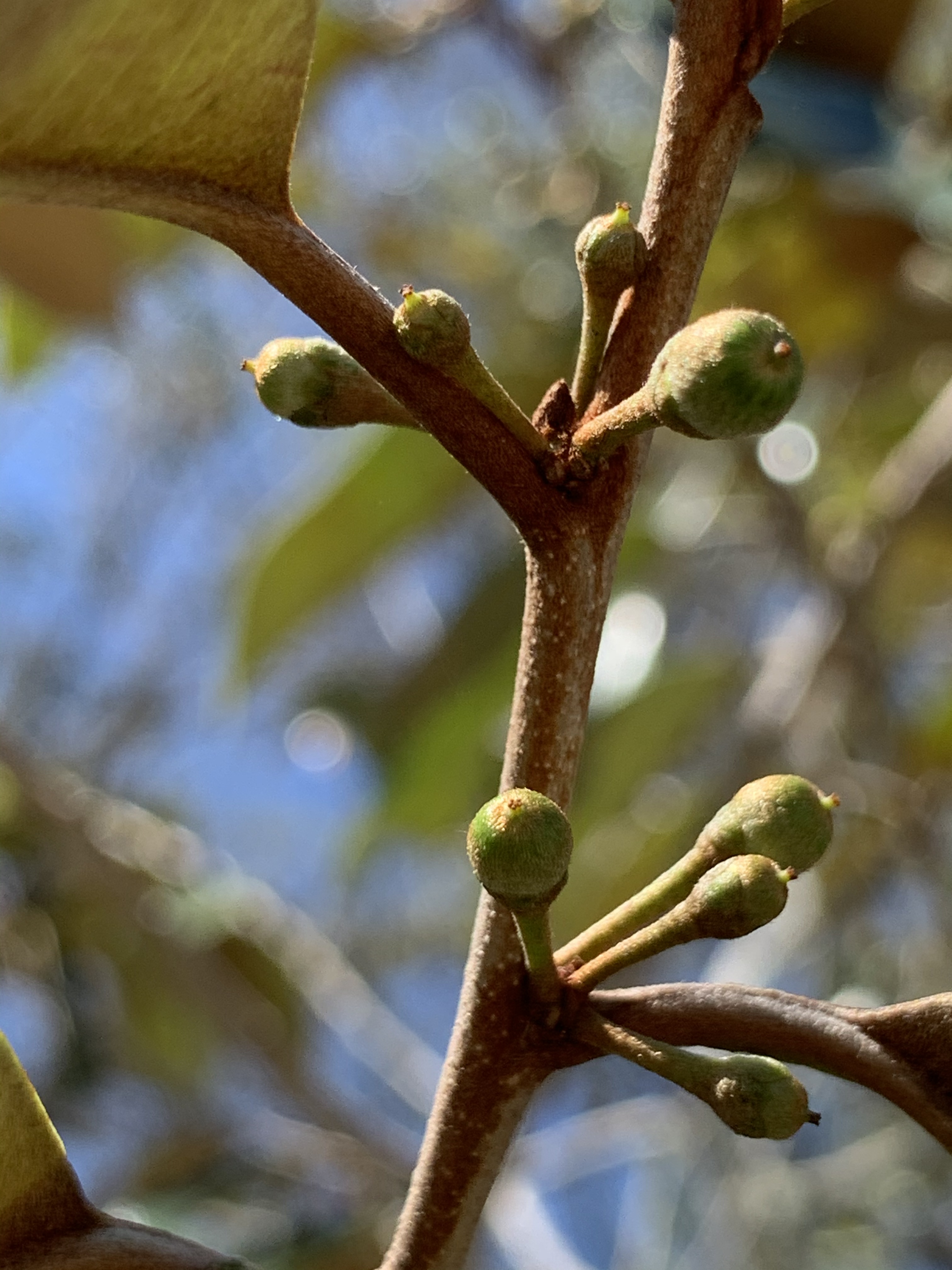
Chrysophyllum oliviforme—fruits

== Distribution ==
Chrysophyllum oliviforme is native to Florida, the Bahamas, the Greater Antilles, and Belize. It is also used as a decorative tree in many tropical countries. It has been declared invasive in Hawaii and has been naturalized in French Polynesia. They live in warmer, tropical climates because they do not do well with cold and can be severely damaged by temperatures lower than 0 °C.

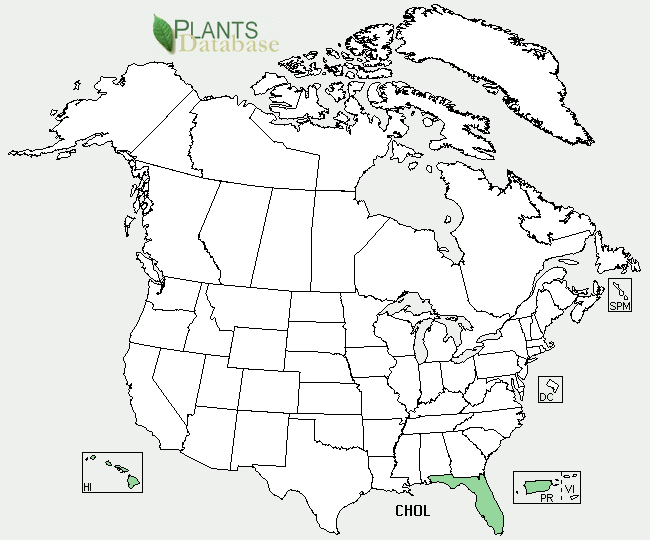
Distribution in the United States

In Florida Chrysophyllum oliviforme is listed as endangered in the wild, although many can still be found in south Florida owing to their role as ornamentals.

Chrysophyllum oliviforme is invasive in Hawaii. No specific actions are being funded to remove this species, but its cultivation is discouraged.

== Habitat and ecology ==
Chrysophyllum oliviforme can grow in a variety of soil types, including clay, sand, loam, alkaline or acidic, and well-drained or moist. They grow in the sand and shallow clay in Puerto Rico, while in Florida they are known to grow in pinelands and hammocks. They grow well in low elevation moist secondary forests. They have a low to moderate tolerance of salt and a moderate tolerance of drought. They can withstand pH between 5 and 8. As mentioned earlier, they can be severely damaged by freezing temperatures below 0 °C.

== Usage ==
=== Food ===
Chrysophyllum oliviforme have edible fruit, which are generally eaten fresh.

=== Other uses ===
Hard, heavy, and strong, the wood of the tree is used in construction. It is difficult to carve but good for things such as fence posts, rafters, and other situations where a strong beam is needed.

It is also used as a decorative tree for yards, sidewalks, and other public spaces.
