= Chrysophyllum amazonicum =

Conservation status
- Least Concern (IUCN 3.1)

Scientific classification
- Kingdom: Plantae
- Clade: Tracheophytes
- Clade: Angiosperms
- Clade: Eudicots
- Clade: Asterids
- Order: Ericales
- Family: Sapotaceae
- Genus: Chrysophyllum
- Species: C. amazonicum

Binomial name
- Chrysophyllum amazonicum T.D.Penn.

Synonyms
- Prieurella lanceolata Aubrév.; Prieurella wurdackii Aubrév.

Species of flowering plant

Chrysophyllum amazonicum is a tree in the family Sapotaceae, native to tropical South America.

== Description ==
Chrysophyllum amazonicum grows up to 30 metres (100 ft) tall, with a trunk diameter of up to 50 cm (20 in). It has small buttresses. The brown bark is fissured. Its ovate or oblanceolate leaves measure up to 15 cm (6 in) long. Fascicles feature up to 25 yellow to green flowers. The fruits ripen yellow and measure up to 3.5 cm (1.4 in) long.

== Distribution and habitat ==
Chrysophyllum amazonicum is native to Colombia, Venezuela, Ecuador, Peru and Brazil. Its habitat is in rainforest at altitudes up to 800 m (2,600 ft).
