= Chrysophyllum colombianum =

Conservation status
- Least Concern (IUCN 3.1)

Scientific classification
- Kingdom: Plantae
- Clade: Embryophytes
- Clade: Tracheophytes
- Clade: Spermatophytes
- Clade: Angiosperms
- Clade: Eudicots
- Clade: Asterids
- Order: Ericales
- Family: Sapotaceae
- Genus: Chrysophyllum
- Species: C. colombianum

Binomial name
- Chrysophyllum colombianum (Aubrév.) T.D.Penn.

Synonyms
- Prieurella colombiana Aubrév.

Species of tree

Chrysophyllum colombianum is a tree in the family Sapotaceae, native to Central and South America.

== Description ==
Chrysophyllum colombianum grows up to 15 metres (50 ft) tall, with a trunk diameter of up to 15 cm (6 in). Its red to brown bark is scaly. The oblanceolate leaves measure up to 25 cm (10 in) long. Fascicles feature up to 15 greenish flowers. The fruits ripen brownish-gold and measure up to 4.5 cm (2 in) long.

== Distribution and habitat ==
Chrysophyllum colombianum is native to an area from Costa Rica in the north to Brazil and Peru in the south. Its habitat is in rainforest at altitudes up to 1,200 m (4,000 ft).
