= Chrysophyllum durifructum =

Conservation status
- Endangered (IUCN 3.1)

Scientific classification
- Kingdom: Plantae
- Clade: Tracheophytes
- Clade: Angiosperms
- Clade: Eudicots
- Clade: Asterids
- Order: Ericales
- Family: Sapotaceae
- Genus: Chrysophyllum
- Species: C. durifructum

Binomial name
- Chrysophyllum durifructum (W.A.Rodrigues) T.D.Penn.

Synonyms
- Achrouteria durifructa W.A.Rodrigues

Species of flowering plant

Chrysophyllum durifructum is a tree in the family Sapotaceae, native to Brazil.

== Description ==
Chrysophyllum durifructum grows up to 30 metres (100 ft) tall, with a trunk diameter of up to 50 cm (20 in). The bark is scaly. Its oblanceolate leaves measure up to 28 cm (11 in) long. Fascicles feature up to 10 green flowers. The fruits ripen green and measure up to 6.5 cm (3 in) long.

== Distribution and habitat ==
Chrysophyllum durifructum is native to Brazil, where it is only known from an area of Amazonas north of Manaus. Its habitat is in lowland forest.
