= Chrysophyllum prieurii =

Conservation status
- Least Concern (IUCN 3.1)

Scientific classification
- Kingdom: Plantae
- Clade: Tracheophytes
- Clade: Angiosperms
- Clade: Eudicots
- Clade: Asterids
- Order: Ericales
- Family: Sapotaceae
- Genus: Chrysophyllum
- Species: C. prieurii

Binomial name
- Chrysophyllum prieurii A.DC.

Synonyms
- Chrysophyllum cyanogenum Ducke; Ecclinusa cyanogena (Ducke) Aubrév.; Ecclinusa prieurii (A.DC.) Aubrév.; Prieurella prieurii (A.DC.) Aubrév.

Species of flowering plant

Chrysophyllum prieurii is a tree in the family Sapotaceae, native to South America and Panama.

== Description ==
Chrysophyllum prieurii grows up to 35 metres (110 ft) tall, with a trunk diameter of up to 1 m (3 ft). It has buttresses up to 2 m (7 ft) high. Its fissured bark is brown to reddish-brown. The obovate or oblanceolate leaves measure up to 20 cm (8 in) long. Fascicles feature up to 10 green flowers. The roundish fruits measure up to 4 cm (1.6 in) long.

== Distribution and habitat ==
Chrysophyllum prieurii is native to an area from Panama in the north to Brazil and Peru in the south. Its habitat is in dry lowland rainforest and wet rainforest up to altitudes of 1,200 m (4,000 ft).
