= Chrysophyllum ucuquirana-branca =

Scientific classification
- Kingdom: Plantae
- Clade: Embryophytes
- Clade: Tracheophytes
- Clade: Spermatophytes
- Clade: Angiosperms
- Clade: Eudicots
- Clade: Asterids
- Order: Ericales
- Family: Sapotaceae
- Genus: Chrysophyllum
- Species: C. ucuquirana-branca

Binomial name
- Chrysophyllum ucuquirana-branca (Aubrév. & Pellegr.) T.D.Penn.

Synonyms
- Ecclinusa ucuquirana-branca Aubrév. & Pellegr.; Ragala ucuquirana-branca (Aubrév. & Pellegr.) W.A.Rodrigues

Species of tree

Chrysophyllum ucuquirana-branca is a tree in the family Sapotaceae, native to tropical South America.

== Description ==
Chrysophyllum ucuquirana-branca grows up to 30 metres (100 ft) tall, with a trunk diameter of up to 45 cm (18 in). Larger trees feature buttresses. The brown bark is scaly. Its elliptic leaves measure up to 24 cm (9 in) long. Fascicles feature up to 20 greenish flowers. The fruits ripen red and measure up to 5 cm (2 in) long.

== Distribution and habitat ==
Chrysophyllum ucuquirana-branca is native to Colombia, Venezuela and northern Brazil. Its habitat is in rainforest.
