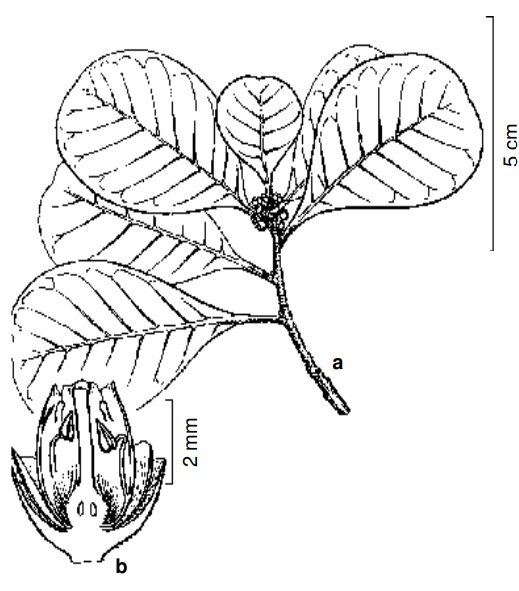

Conservation status
- Least Concern (IUCN 3.1)

Scientific classification
- Kingdom: Plantae
- Clade: Embryophytes
- Clade: Tracheophytes
- Clade: Spermatophytes
- Clade: Angiosperms
- Clade: Eudicots
- Clade: Asterids
- Order: Ericales
- Family: Sapotaceae
- Genus: Chrysophyllum
- Species: C. pomiferum

Binomial name
- Chrysophyllum pomiferum (Eyma) T.D.Penn.

Synonyms
- Achrouteria pomifera Eyma; Planchonella guianensis P.Royen; Pouteria pomifera (Eyma) Baehni

= Chrysophyllum pomiferum =

Species of tree

Chrysophyllum pomiferum is a tree in the family Sapotaceae, native to tropical South America.

== Description ==
Chrysophyllum pomiferum grows up to 40 metres (130 ft) tall, with a trunk diameter of up to 75 cm (30 in). Its brown bark is scaly. The obovate or oblanceolate leaves measure up to 11 cm (4 in) long. Fascicles feature up to 10 greenish-white flowers. The roundish fruits ripen yellowish-orange and measure up to 5 cm (2 in) long.

== Distribution and habitat ==
Chrysophyllum pomiferum is native to northern and western South America, including northern Brazil. Its habitat is in rainforest at altitudes up to 700 m (2,300 ft).
