= Pradosia grisebachii =

Conservation status
- Least Concern (IUCN 2.3)

Scientific classification
- Kingdom: Plantae
- Clade: Tracheophytes
- Clade: Angiosperms
- Clade: Eudicots
- Clade: Asterids
- Order: Ericales
- Family: Sapotaceae
- Genus: Pradosia
- Species: P. grisebachii

Binomial name
- Pradosia grisebachii (Pierre) T.D.Penn.

Species of flowering plant

Pradosia grisebachii is a species of plant in the family Sapotaceae. It is found in Trinidad and Tobago and Venezuela.
