= Chrysophyllum manaosense =

Conservation status
- Least Concern (IUCN 3.1)

Scientific classification
- Kingdom: Plantae
- Clade: Tracheophytes
- Clade: Angiosperms
- Clade: Eudicots
- Clade: Asterids
- Order: Ericales
- Family: Sapotaceae
- Genus: Chrysophyllum
- Species: C. manaosense

Binomial name
- Chrysophyllum manaosense (Aubrév.) T.D.Penn.

Synonyms
- Prieurella manaosensis Aubrév.

Species of flowering plant

Chrysophyllum manaosense is a tree in the family Sapotaceae, native to tropical South America.

== Description ==
Chrysophyllum manaosense grows up to 40 metres (130 ft) tall, with a trunk diameter of up to 65 cm (26 in). Its red to brown bark is fissured. The obovate or oblanceolate leaves measure up to 15.5 cm (6 in) long. Fascicles feature up to 15 greenish flowers. The fruits ripen red to orange and measure up to 4 cm (2 in) long.

== Distribution and habitat ==
Chrysophyllum manaosense is native to Colombia, Ecuador, Peru, Brazil and Suriname. Its habitat is in rainforest at altitudes up to 300 m (1,000 ft).
