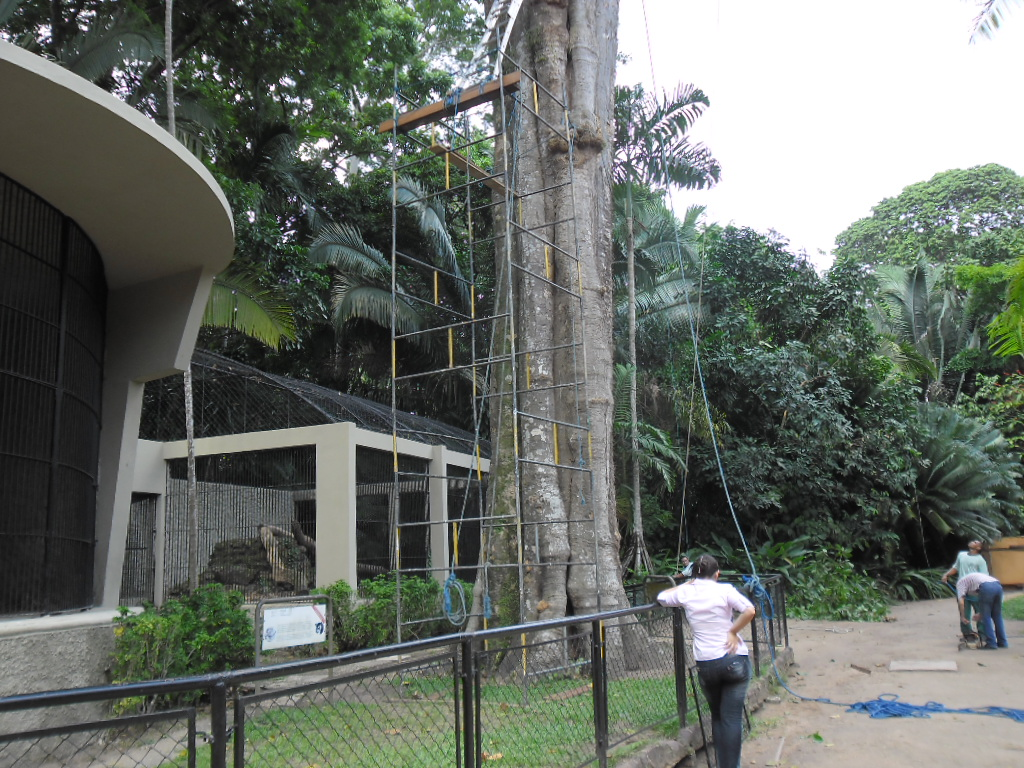
- At Museu Paraense Emílio Goeldi, Belém, Brazil

Conservation status
- Least Concern (IUCN 3.1)

Scientific classification
- Kingdom: Plantae
- Clade: Embryophytes
- Clade: Tracheophytes
- Clade: Spermatophytes
- Clade: Angiosperms
- Clade: Eudicots
- Clade: Asterids
- Order: Ericales
- Family: Sapotaceae
- Genus: Cornuella
- Species: C. venezuelanensis

Binomial name
- Cornuella venezuelanensis Pierre

Synonyms
- Achras mayana (Lundell) Lundell; Chrysophyllum venezuelanense (Pierre) T.D.Penn.; Chrysophyllum excelsum Huber; Gambeya excelsa (Huber) Aubrév.; Lucuma lucentifolia Standl.; Lucuma pentasperma Standl.; Pouteria dibrachiata Lundell; Pouteria lucentifolia (Standl.) Baehni; Pouteria mayana Lundell; Pouteria pentasperma (Standl.) Baehni; Pouteria petenensis Lundell

= Cornuella venezuelanensis =

Species of tree

Cornuella venezuelanensis (synonym Chrysophyllum venezuelanense) is a tree in the family Sapotaceae, native to the tropical Americas. It is the sole species in the genus Cornuella.

== Description ==
Cornuella venezuelanensis grows up to 30 metres (100 ft) tall. The fruit is yellow.

== Distribution and habitat ==
Cornuella venezuelanensis is native to Mexico, Central America and tropical South America including Brazil. Its habitat is mainly in lowland forests.

== Uses ==
The fruit of Cornuella venezuelanensis is edible. The timber is used in construction and for fences.
