= Pokrovka, Mykolaiv Raion, Mykolaiv Oblast =

Village in Mykolaiv Oblast, Ukraine

Pokrovka Покровка
- Village
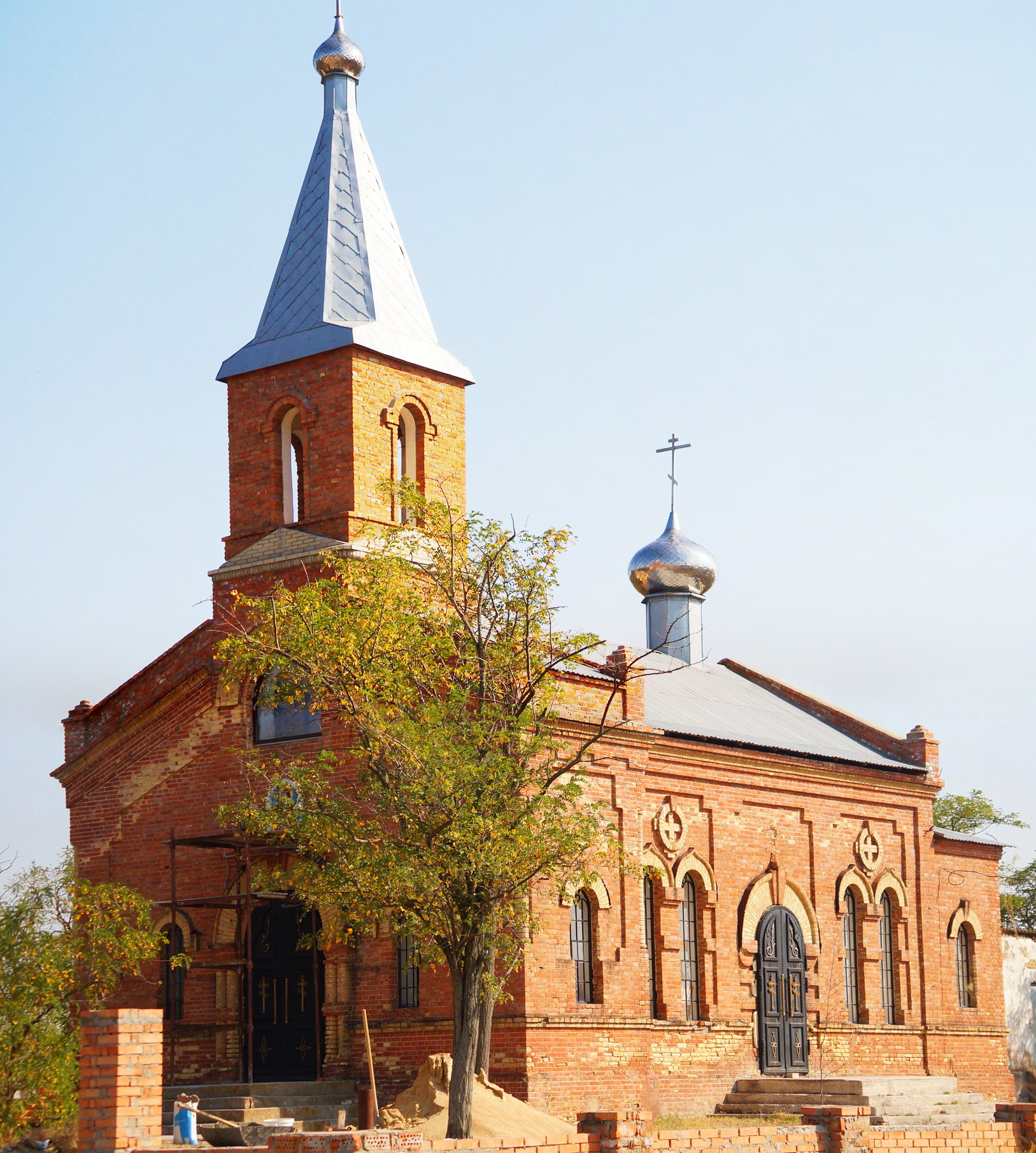
- Church of the Intercession (19th century)
- Interactive map of Pokrovka
- Location of Pokrovka within Ukraine Pokrovka (Ukraine)
- Coordinates: 46.486944°N 31.699444°E
- Country: Ukraine
- Oblast: Mykolaiv Oblast
- Raion: Mykolaiv Raion

Area
  - Total: 5.275 km^{2} (2.037 sq mi)
- Elevation: 0 m (0 ft)

Population (2001 census)
  - Total: 229
  - Density: 43.4/km^{2} (112/sq mi)
- Time zone: UTC+2 (EET)
  - Summer (DST): UTC+3 (EEST)
- Postal code: 57555
- Area code: +380 5154
- Control: Occupied by Russia

Pokrovka (Ukrainian: Покровка; Russian: Покровка) is a village in Mykolaiv Raion (district) in Mykolaiv Oblast of southern Ukraine, at about 53.8 kilometres (33.4 mi) southwest by south (SWbS) of the centre of Mykolaiv city. It belongs to Ochakiv urban hromada, one of the hromadas of Ukraine. Until 18 July 2020, Pokrovka was the administrative center of Ochakiv Raion. In July 2020, as part of the administrative reform of Ukraine, which reduced the number of raions of Mykolaiv Oblast to four, Ochakiv Raion was merged into Mykolaiv Raion.

== Russo-Ukrainian War ==
Pokrovka came under attack and was occupied by Russian forces during the Russian invasion of Ukraine in 2022. The invasion occurred as a result of the escalating Russo-Ukrainian War. The village, as well as all other occupied territory in the Mykolaiv Oblast, was annexed by Russia as part of their Kherson Oblast.

Following a Russian withdrawal and a counter offensive by Ukrainian forces between November 9 and 11, almost all settlements in the Mykolaiv Oblast were retaken by Ukraine. The exceptions are Pokrovka, as well as the other settlements on the Kinburn Peninsula, Pokrovske and Vasylivka.

== Demographics ==
As of the 2001 Ukrainian census, Pokrovka had a population of 229 people. The linguistic composition of the population was as follows:

Ukrainian national census (2001)
Language	Inhabitants	Percentage
Ukrainian	203	88.6%
Russian	26	11.4%
others	0	0.0%
Total:	229	100%

== Nature ==
Pokrovka is located within the Biloberezhia Sviatoslav National Park, in the Dnieper estuary.
