= Kinburn Spit =

Sandbar in Mykolaiv Oblast, Ukraine

Kinburn Spit Кінбурнська коса (Ukrainian)
- Spit
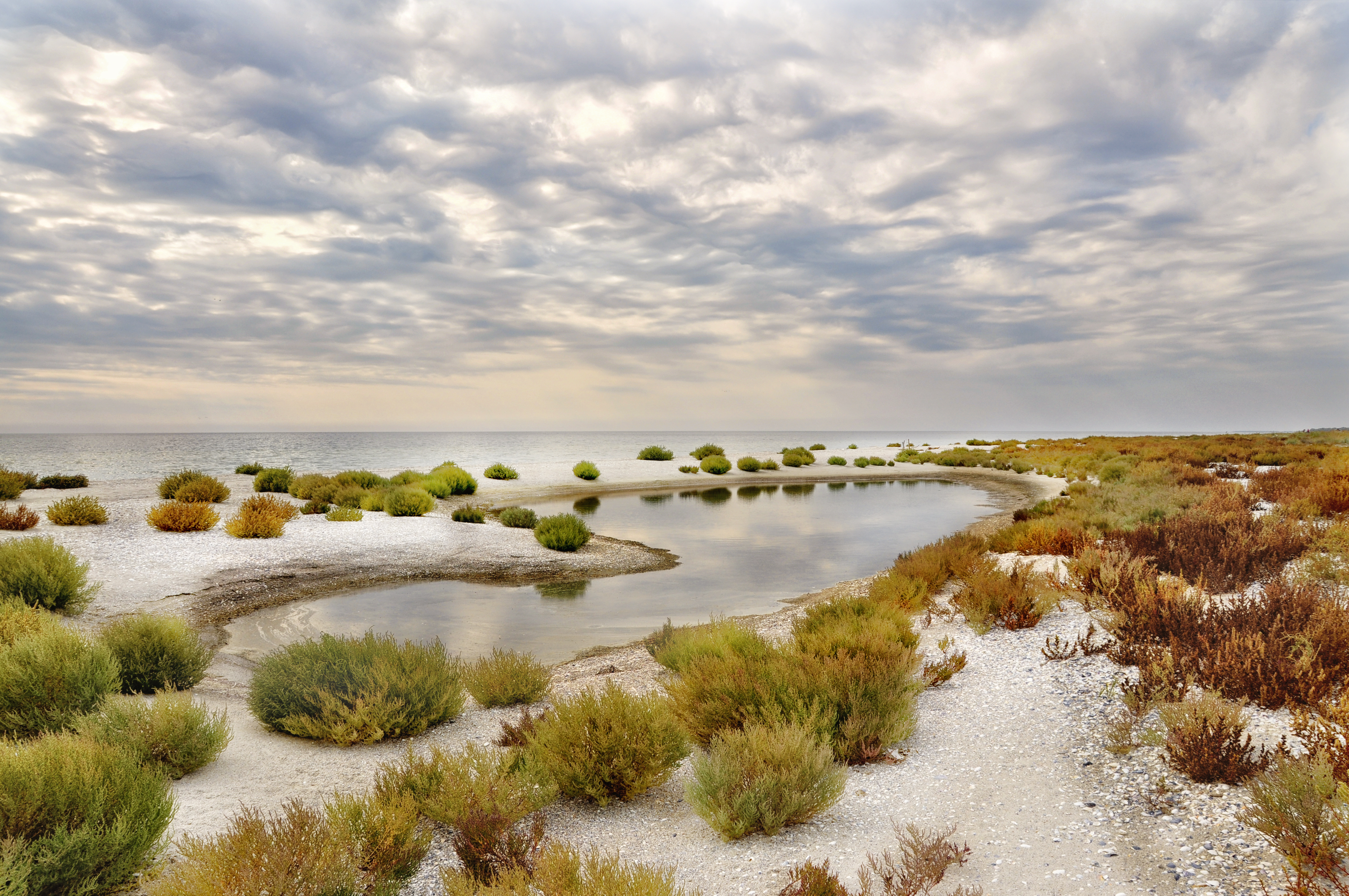
- The Kinburn Spit in autumn
- Interactive map of Kinburn Spit
- Coordinates: 46°33′31″N 31°31′40″E
- Location: Mykolaiv Raion, Mykolaiv Oblast, Ukraine

Dimensions
  - Length: 10 kilometres (6.2 mi) long
  - Width: 1 kilometre (0.62 mi) wide

The Kinburn Spit (Ukrainian: Кінбурнська коса, romanized: Kinbúrnska kosá) is a spit in Mykolaiv Raion, Mykolaiv Oblast, Ukraine. Its only land access is through Kherson Oblast. It occupies the westernmost part of the Kinburn Peninsula, stretching west into the Black Sea between the Dnieper-Bug estuary to the north and the Yahorlyk Bay to the south. It is approximately 10 kilometres (6.2 mi) long, with a width of about 1 kilometre (0.62 mi) at its base, narrowing to about 100 metres (330 ft) in its western half.

During the Russian invasion of Ukraine, the spit was captured by Russian forces on 10 June 2022. Russia fortified the spit and used it as a site to deploy electronic warfare and coordinate missile and artillery attacks on nearby Ukrainian positions. Since Ukraine's 2022 Kherson counteroffensive that ended in November 2022, regained territory north of the spit has allowed Ukrainian forces to more frequently conduct amphibious operations against the spit as reconnaissance for its potential recapture.

== History ==
During the 2nd millennium BCE, rising sea levels submerged plains in the lower Dnipro, leaving the Dnipro-Buh estuary, including Kinburn, as wooded land.

There were some itinerant metalworkers in the Northern Black Sea region during the Late Bronze Age, and some came over for the local resources like calcium sands and hematite sands. During the archaic period, sometime in the 7th-4th century BC, the Yahorlyk craft settlement was founded as a temporary seasonal market on the spit. It produced a wide range of copper and bronze objects, and most were workers from the Middle Dnipro, Balkans, North Caucasus, Cisurals, and Western Siberia. However, the settlement went into decline with the founding of Olbia. It was mentioned by the Greek historian Herodotus in the 5th century BC. Later, Greek colonizers came, where they left the ruins of an ancient Greek ship dating to the third quarter of the fifth century (which was meant to carry a cargo of olive oil and wine) and an altar in honor of Achilles.

The Battle of Kinburn was fought on 12 October (N.S.)/1 October (O.S.) 1787 as part of the Russo-Turkish War (1787–1792).

The Battle of Kinburn was fought on 17 October 1855 as part of the Crimean War.

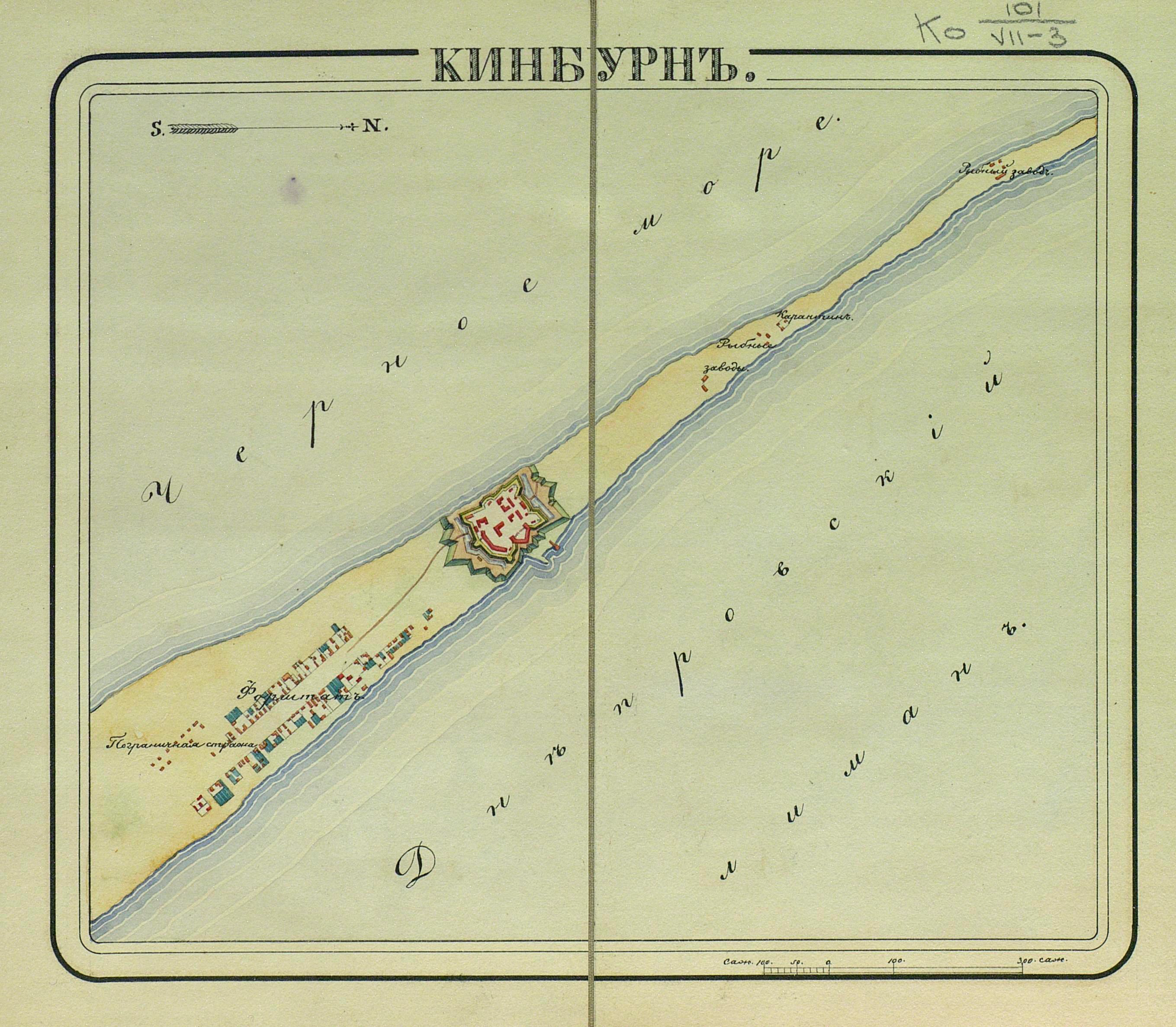
A map c.1830 depicting the Kinburn Fort on the spit.

Until the mid-19th century, an Ottoman fort was located on Kinburn Spit, which was taken over by Russians at the end of the 18th century. It was dismantled following the 1853-1856 Crimean War under the terms of the Treaty of Paris (1856). During the control of the Soviet Union from 1922-1991, the entire Kinburn Peninsula had a population of more than 1,000 in the three villages located there, and was known for its strawberry growing and harvesting. The harvested crop would often be flown to Odesa for wider distribution in farmers' markets. Approximately after the fall of the Soviet Union in 1991, the population in all three villages dropped, and as of 2022 stood at around 150 combined; the majority of the strawberry growing and harvesting stopped. This has led to Kinburn becoming a Natural Park in Ukraine, preserving the remaining ecosystem and wildlife, specifically the unique pink pelicans which live there. The majority of the revenue from the spit before the invasion came from campers, hikers, and stargazers visiting the National Park.

=== 2022 Russian invasion ===
The Kinburn Spit was not occupied by Russian forces at the beginning of the 2022 Russian invasion of Ukraine. Four months later, on 10 June, Russian forces took the spit. The capture of the spit was one of the last significant Russian military victories on the southern Ukrainian front in 2022.

During the occupation, Russian forces deployed electronic warfare systems and coordinated shelling of the right bank of the Dnieper and southern Ukraine. The spit was also used as a launch site for missile and artillery attacks on Ukrainian-controlled positions in Ochakiv, southern Mykolaiv Oblast, and the Black Sea coast. The spit housed at least one ammunition depot and potentially a combat drone control and training center. The spit was believed to be well-fortified by Russia with square concrete bunkers.

The war has not only had a disruptive and destructive impact on the residents who lived on the Kinburn Spit, but to the unique plants and wildlife such as the Centaurea breviceps and Centaurea Paczoskii cornflower species, and their sensitive ecosystem. Bombs, and the pollutants that came from them, killed nearby dolphins, and opened the sand and soil to the threat of chemicals seeping in and invasive species, according to the research and policy director at the UK-based Conflict and Environment Observatory Doug Weir. In May 2022 a 4,000 hectares (10,000 acres) fire, started by rockets, inflicted lasting habitat damage to the perennial forests and salt marshes of the spit.

Ukraine conducted the first recorded reconnaissance attempts on the spit beginning in September 2022 on the advice of the United Kingdom. Assaults and strikes continued throughout September and into October.

==== Dnieper campaign (2022–present) ====
After the Russian retreat from the west bank of the Dnieper river during the Ukrainian southern counteroffensive on 11 November 2022, all remaining Russian-occupied territory in Mykolaiv Oblast except the Kinburn Spit was recaptured by Ukrainian forces. Ukraine once again had access to the mouth of the Dnieper, although navigation to the Black Sea was still not possible. Ochakiv became less vulnerable to Russian artillery attacks after the frontline shift, allowing Ukrainian forces to stage attacks from there with less threat of disruption. Ochakiv was the closest settlement to the spit at a distance of only 4 kilometres (2.5 mi) across the strait, the Russian retreat put Kinburn "well within massed artillery range" according to Mike Martin, a fellow at the Department of War Studies at King's College London. On 12 November, Ukraine's Operational Command South officially announced their intention to recapture Kinburn Spit.

On the night of 13 November, Ukrainian landing groups from Ochakiv attempted to land on the spit at Pokrovske after conducting limited raids and small boat landings in the days before. Reports the operation had been a success circulated on mainly Ukrainian social networks until the rebuff was officially clarified by the Armed Forces of Ukraine on 15 November. On 14 November, Russian forces launched S-300 missiles at Ochakiv, which they reported was to disrupt Ukrainian fire control over the spit, delaying future attempts at a landing. On 16 November, Ukraine's Operational Command South reported that its forces had carried out more than 50 strikes around the spit to disrupt Russian shelling and electronic warfare. The strikes reportedly killed 17 Russian troops and damaged 18 pieces of military equipment. On 18 and 19 November, Ukrainian attacks reportedly continued, successfully targeting concentrations of Russian forces and equipment. On 21 November, Ukrainian head of the press center of the Security and Defense Forces of the Operational Command South Natalia Humeniuk officially confirmed that Ukraine was conducting military operations on the spit, but called for operational silence, which was confirmed a day later by the CSCIS who said that Ukrainian forces had yet to officially recapture ground. Along with reports of continued Russian shellings of Ochakiv, satellite imagery showcased by the Institute for the Study of War (ISW) on 27 November revealed that since approximately the 11 November retreat, Russian forces had been fortifying the 3 kilometres (1.9 mi) wide strip of land separating the spit from mainland Kherson Oblast. The new information promoted the following response from the ISW,

The array of Russian fortifications on and around the Kinburn Spit (as shown in the map) suggests that Russian forces do not expect to maintain positions on the spit itself if Ukrainian forces launch a counterattack against the spit; rather, Russian forces very likely expect Ukrainian forces to take the Kinburn Spit but intend to prevent them from advancing to mainland Kherson Oblast and to defend against an amphibious attack on the land immediately surrounding the spit's connection to mainland Kherson Oblast.

— Russian Offensive Campaign Assessment, November 27, Institute for the Study of War

Despite this advantage in fortification, it was reported by Natalia Humeniuk during a telethon on 28 November that weather was playing a role in complicating Ukrainian military operations. The same day, Russian forces deported the last remaining 37 residents from the already sparsely populated area, as military operations continued there. Volodymyr Saldo on 22 December, followed by another Russian source on 24 December 2022, claimed that Ukrainian forces were regularly shelling the spit with long-range artillery and had destroyed a Russian port building there as a result, but that repeated assaults had been repelled.

On 9 August 2024, Ukrainian forces conducted another raid on the spit. Ukrainian Military Intelligence claimed six armored vehicles and around thirty Russian soldiers were eliminated, while the Russian Ministry of Defense claimed the raid had been repelled and the attackers killed.

On 8 June 2026, the Institute for the Study of War (ISW) reported that Russian forces are withdrawing from the Kinburn Spit. This was according to partisan group Atesh, who said that the 337th Guards Air Assault Regiment of the 104th Guards Air Assault Division were being redeployed to the "Zaporizhia sector" due to disrupted supplies as a result of Ukrainian attacks. Vladyslav Voloshyn, the spokesperson for the Operational Command South, said that the information was currently unconfirmed.

On 25 June forces from Ukraine's 801st Special Marine Detachment used a drone to drop a Ukrainian flag onto the roof of a building, thereby confirming that Russian troops have abandoned their positions.

== Regional Landscape Park ==
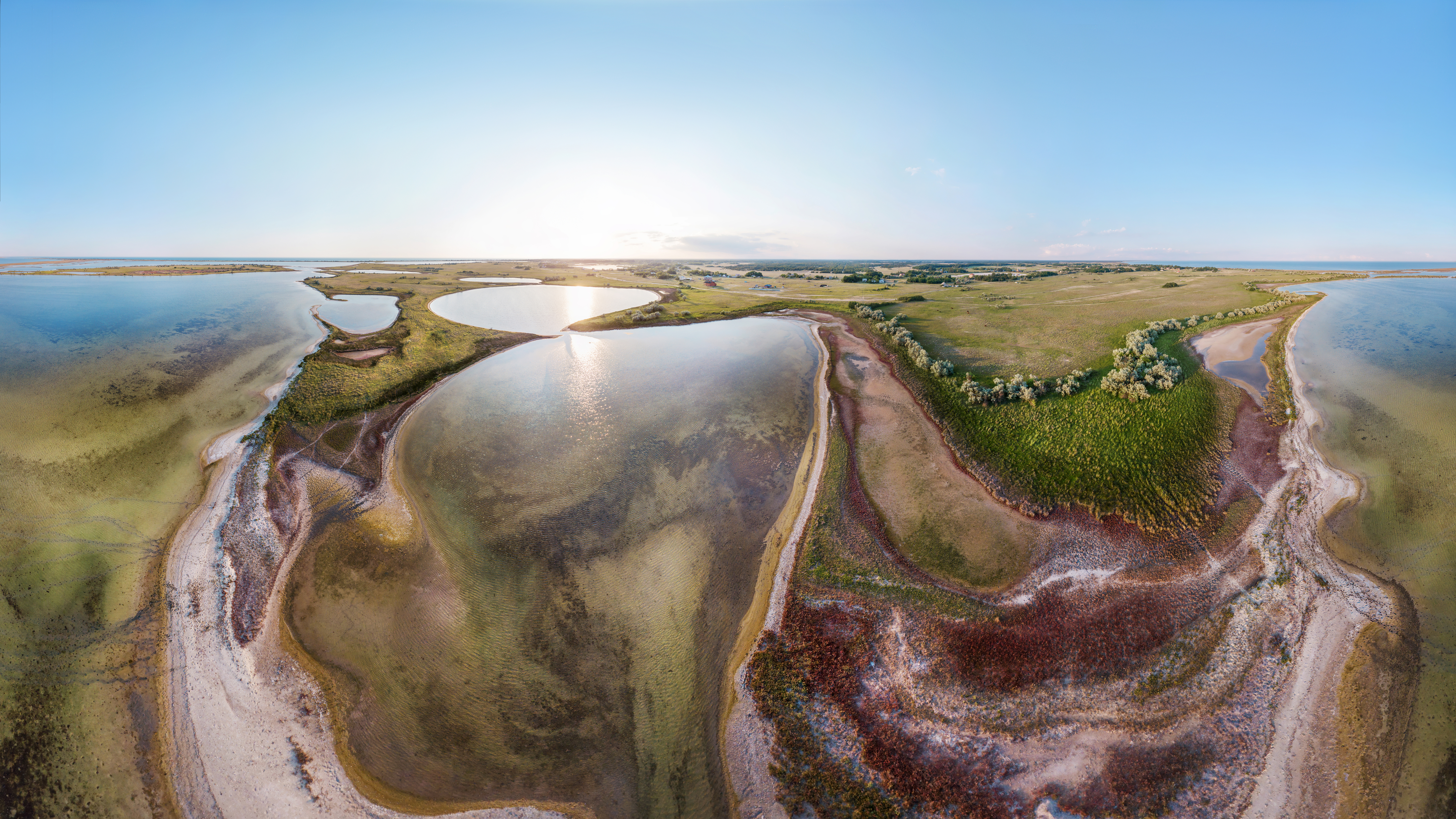
Kinburn sandbar

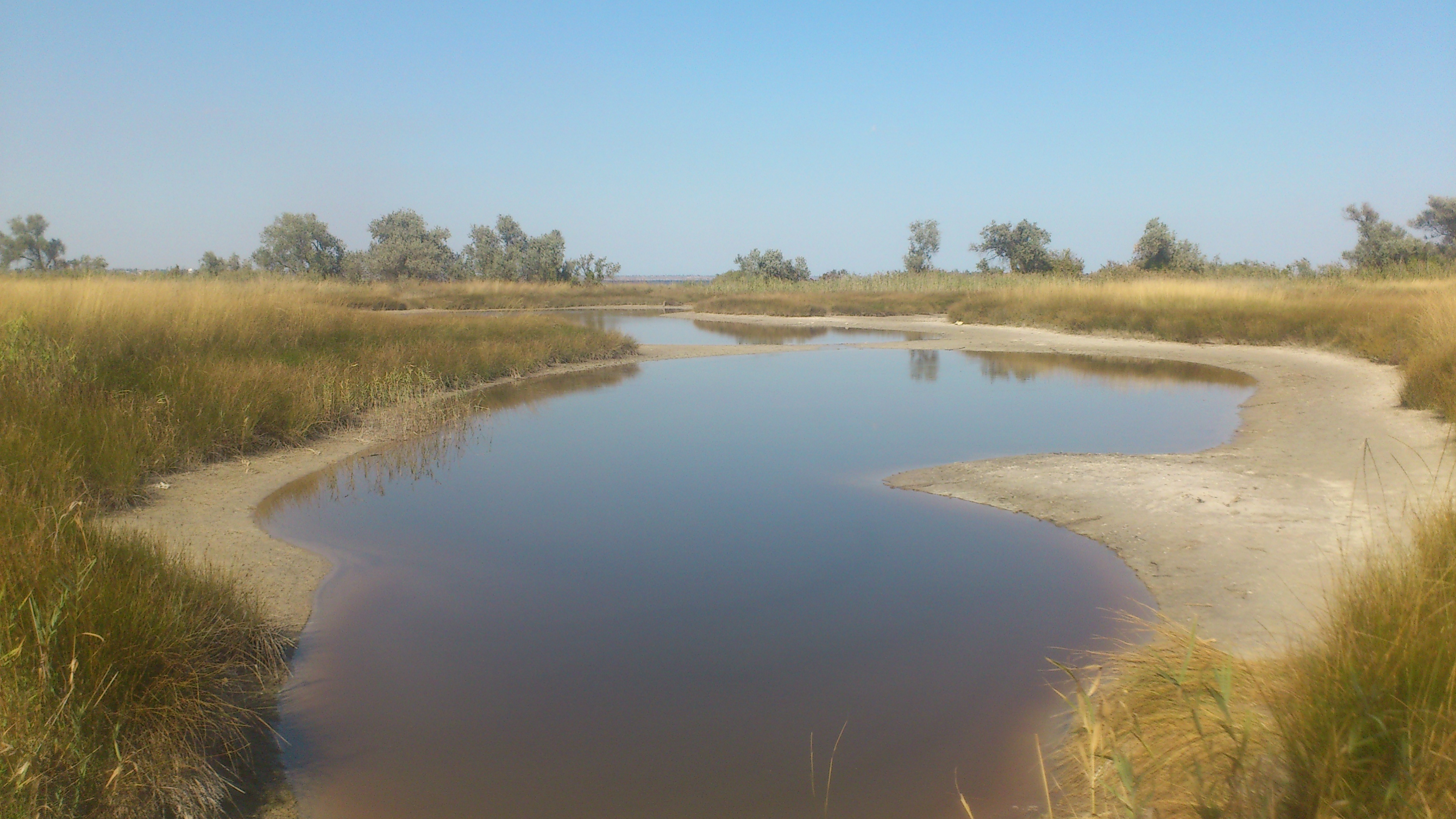
Kinburn sandbar

The Regional Landscape Park of Kinburn Foreland encompasses 17,890 hectares, of which 5,631 ha is covered with water.

Park purposes:

- Conservation of biological and landscape diversity
- Organized citizens' activity
- Cultural and educational activities
- Local needs

Responsibility for compliance with environmental legislation, planning and development of the territory are assigned to the park administration, which is located in Ochakiv.

== Flora and fauna ==
The spit contains a number of endemic species of flora and fauna. There are an estimated 600 species of higher vascular plants which grow on the spit, and because of the beaches and salt meadows, contains a thriving orchid population, with 30–100 orchids every square meter. About 60 plant species found here appear in the Ukrainian Red List.

The spit is also estimated to contain around 5,000 species of fauna, including endangered species of rodents such as the sandy mole rat, blotched snake, and meadow viper. Outside of rodents: various species of dolphins, ducks, herons, pelicans, and eagles inhabit the area as well. The spit also lies on a route around seven million birds migrate through each year.

== See also ==
- Kinburn Peninsula
- List of spits of Ukraine
