= Ochakiv urban hromada =

Ochakiv urban hromada Очаківська міська громада
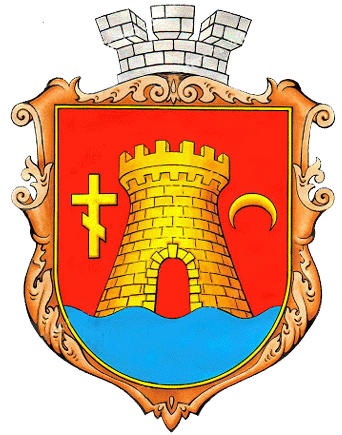
- Seal
- Interactive map of Ochakiv urban hromada
- Country: Ukraine
- Region: Mykolaiv Oblast
- Established: 12 June 2020

Government
  - Head: Serhii Mykolaiovych Bychkov

Ochakiv urban hromada (Ukrainian: Очаківська міська територіальна громада) is a hromada (community) in Ukraine, located in Mykolaiv Raion, Mykolaiv Oblast. Its administrative center is the city of Ochakiv.

It was formed on 12 June 2020 through the merging of local city and village councils in the former Ochakiv Raion.

== Populated places ==
The community contains 4 settlements: 1 city (Ochakiv) and 3 villages:

- Vasylivka
- Pokrovka
- Pokrovske

The villages are all located on the Kinburn Peninsula, and after Russia's withdrawal from the right bank of the Dnipro in November 2022, are the last settlements in Mykolaiv Oblast remaining under Russian control.
