= Pokrovske, Mykolaiv Raion, Mykolaiv Oblast =

Village in Mykolaiv Oblast, Ukraine

Pokrovske Покровське
- Village
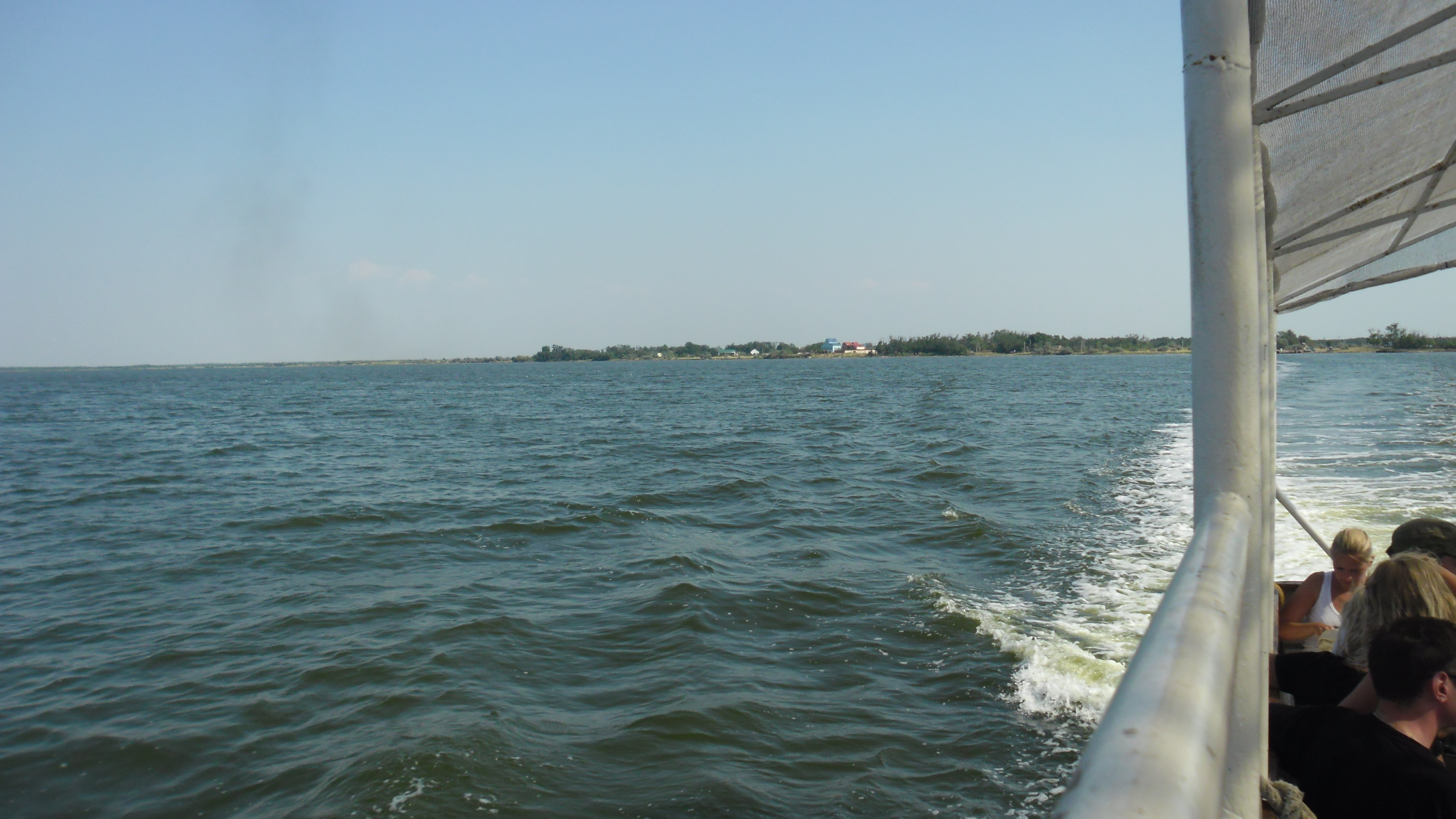
- A view of Pokrovske from a boat to Ochakiv (on a Dnieper estuary)
- Interactive map of Pokrovske
- Location of Pokrovske in Mykolaiv Oblast Pokrovske (Ukraine)
- Coordinates: 46.536389°N 31.611667°E
- Country: Ukraine
- Oblast: Mykolaiv Oblast
- Raion: Mykolaiv Raion

Area
  - Total: 2.428 km^{2} (0.937 sq mi)
- Elevation: 139 m (456 ft)

Population (2001 census)
  - Total: 181
  - Density: 74.5/km^{2} (193/sq mi)
- Time zone: UTC+2 (EET)
  - Summer (DST): UTC+3 (EEST)
- Postal code: 75014
- Area code: +380 5547

Pokrovske (Ukrainian: Покровське; Russian: Покровское) is a village in Mykolaiv Raion (district) in Mykolaiv Oblast of southern Ukraine, at about 78.1 kilometres (48.5 mi) southwest by west (SWbW) of Mykolaiv.

Pokrovske is located on the Kinburn Peninsula, about 67.4 kilometres (41.9 mi) east by north (EbN) of Odesa and about 10.7 kilometres (6.6 mi) southeast by south (SEbS) of Ochakiv. It belongs to Ochakiv urban hromada.

== Russo-Ukrainian War ==
Pokrovske came under attack and was occupied by Russian forces during the Russian invasion of Ukraine in 2022. The invasion occurred as a result of the escalating Russo-Ukrainian War. The village, as well as all other occupied territory in the Mykolaiv Oblast, was annexed by Russia as part of their Kherson Oblast.

Following a Russian withdrawal and a counter offensive by Ukrainian forces between November 9 and 11, almost all settlements in the Mykolaiv Oblast were retaken by Ukraine. The exceptions are Pokrovka as well as the other settlements on the Kinburn Peninsula, Vasylivka and Pokrovka.

On 25 June 2026, Ukrainian media outlets reported that Ukrainian military forces conducted a landing operation in the vicinity of the settlement following a forced Russian withdrawal from the area, and published footage of the Ukrainian flag being raised in the village.

== Demographics ==
As of the 2001 Ukrainian census, Pokrovske counted a population of 181 people. The linguistic composition of the settlement's population was as follows:

First languages in Pokrovske
	percent
Ukrainian	63.8%
Russian	34.5%
Gagauz	1.7%
others	0.0%

== Nature ==
Pokrovske is located within the Biloberezhia Sviatoslav National Park, in the Dnieper estuary.
