= Nechayane =

Town in Mykolaiv Oblast, Ukraine

Nechayane Нечаяне
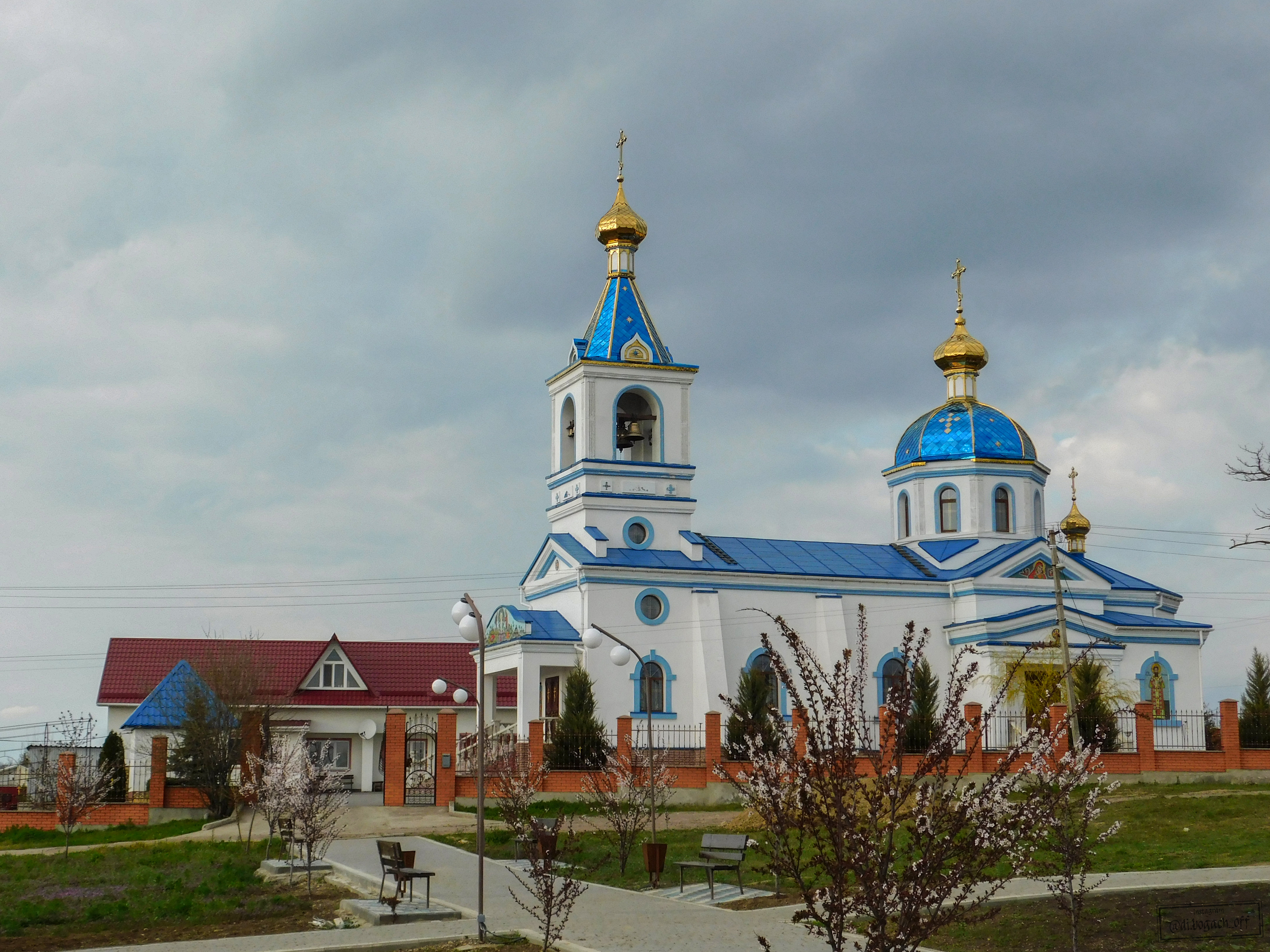
- Church of the Transfiguration of Christ

- Location within Mykolaiv Oblast Location within Ukraine
- Coordinates: 46°56′30″N 31°33′8″E
- Country: Ukraine
- Oblast: Mykolaiv Oblast
- Raion: Mykolaiv Raion
- Time zone: UTC+2 (EET)
  - Summer (DST): UTC+3 (EEST)

Nechayane (Ukrainian: Нечаяне) is a town in Mykolaiv Oblast, in southern Ukraine. The town had a population of 1,874 at the time of the 2001 Ukrainian census.

== Geography ==
The town is located west of Mykolaiv and north of Ochakiv.
