= Vasylivka, Ochakiv urban hromada, Mykolaiv Raion, Mykolaiv Oblast =

Village in Mykolaiv Oblast, Ukraine

Vasylivka Василівка
- Village
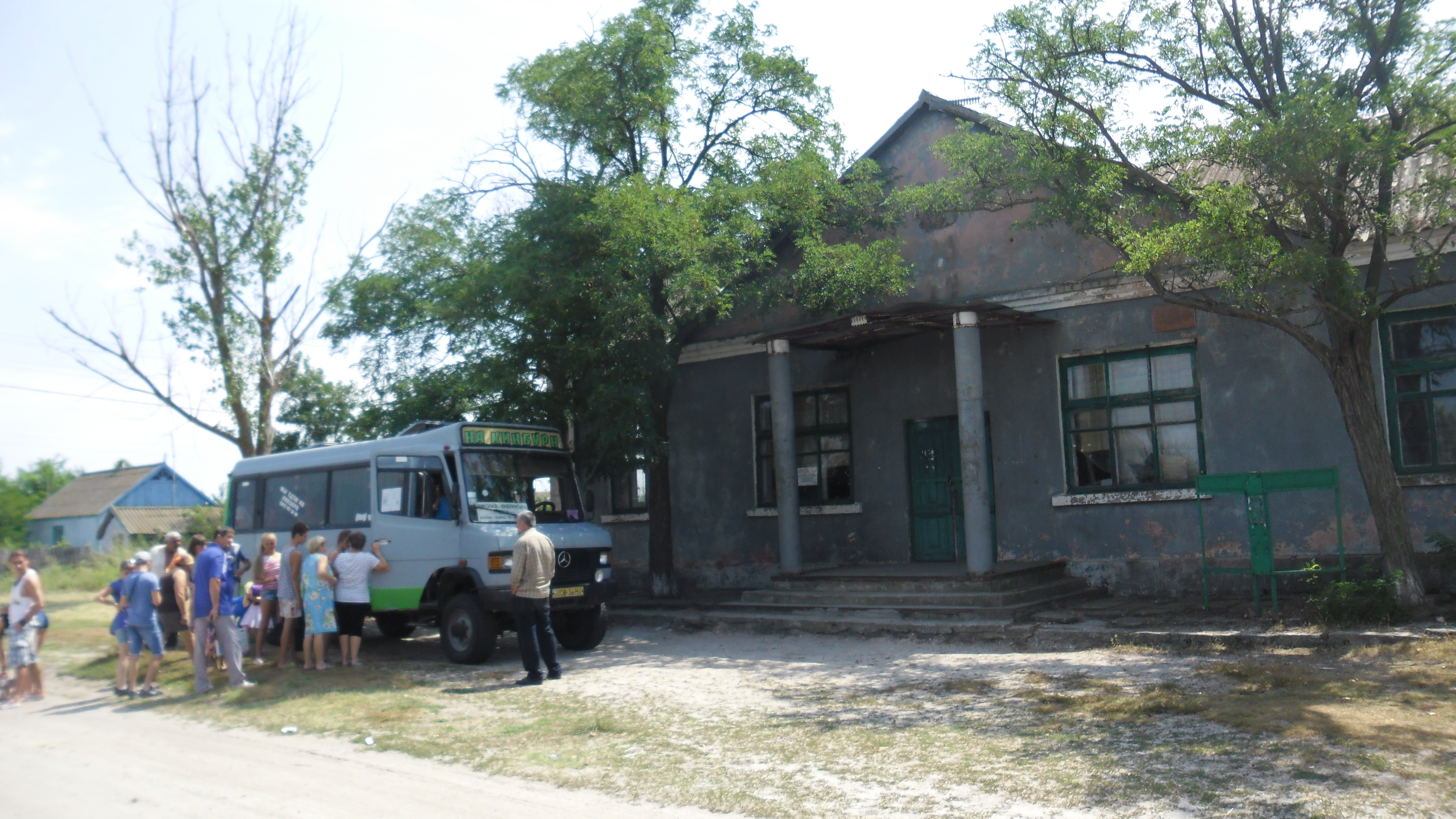
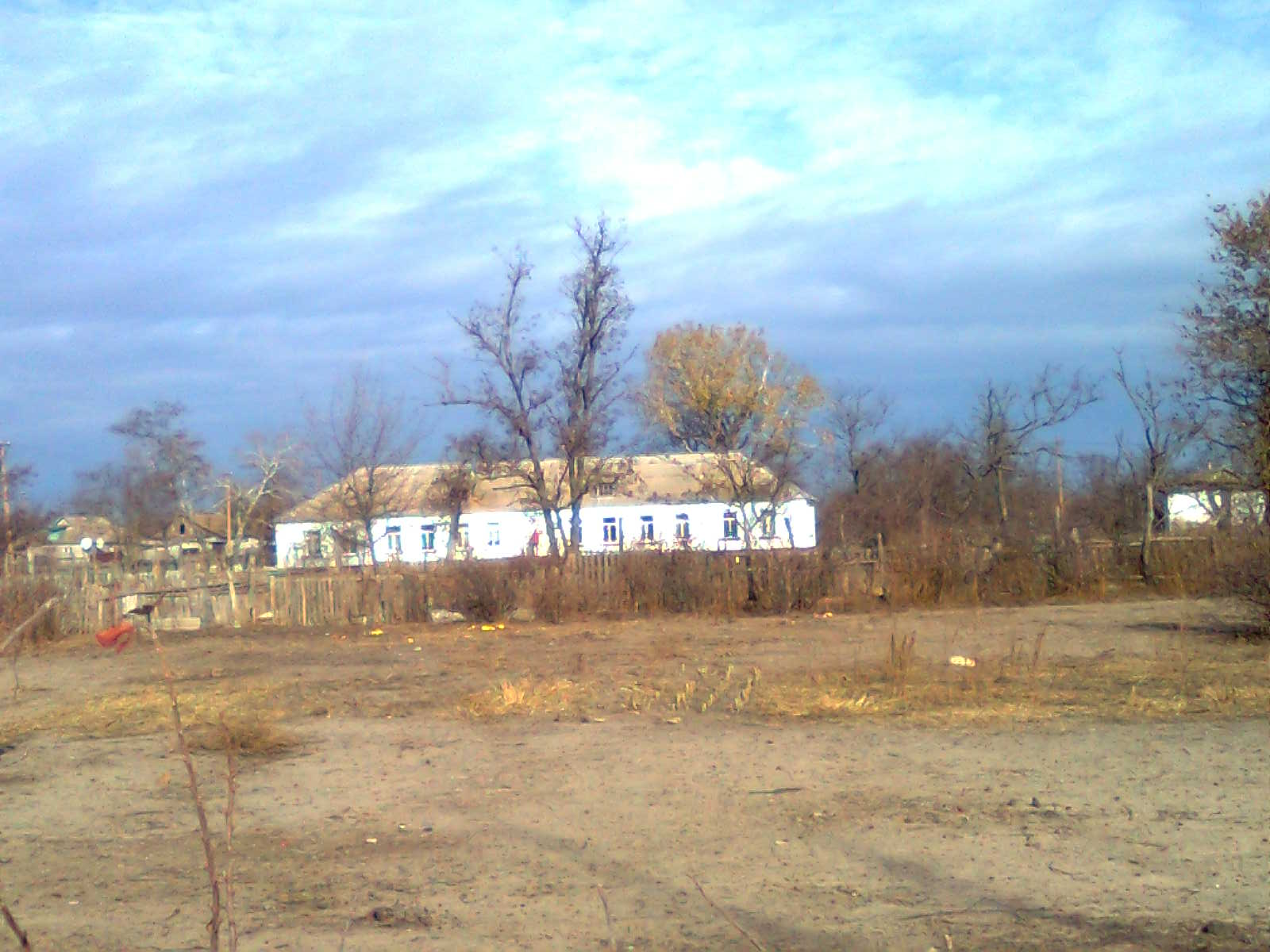
- Top: Bus stop near village clubhouse Bottom: Village school
- Interactive map of Vasylivka
- Location of Vasylivka in Mykolaiv Oblast Vasylivka (Ukraine)
- Coordinates: 46.528889°N 31.790278°E
- Country: Ukraine (occupied by Russia)
- Oblast: Mykolaiv Oblast
- Raion: Mykolaiv Raion

Area
  - Total: 1.433 km^{2} (0.553 sq mi)
- Elevation: 0 m (0 ft)

Population (2001 census)
  - Total: 382
  - Density: 267/km^{2} (690/sq mi)
- Time zone: UTC+2 (EET)
  - Summer (DST): UTC+3 (EEST)
- Postal code: 57555
- Area code: +380 5154

Vasylivka (Ukrainian: Василівка; Russian: Василевка; formerly Oleksandrivka (Олександрівка), also known as Shkadivka (Шкадівка)) is a village on the Kinburn Peninsula in Mykolaiv Raion (district) of Mykolaiv Oblast in southern Ukraine that is located at about 52.6 kilometres (32.7 mi) south-southwest (SSW) of the centre of Mykolaiv city. It belongs to Ochakiv urban hromada, one of the hromadas of Ukraine.

Until 18 July 2020, Vasylivka belonged to Ochakiv Raion. In July 2020, as part of the administrative reform of Ukraine, which reduced the number of raions of Mykolaiv Oblast to four, Ochakiv Raion was merged into Mykolaiv Raion.

== Russo-Ukrainian War ==
Vasylivka came under attack and was occupied by Russian forces during the Russian invasion of Ukraine in 2022. The invasion occurred as a result of the escalating Russo-Ukrainian War. The village, as well as all other occupied territory in the Mykolaiv Oblast, was annexed by Russia as part of their Kherson Oblast.

Following a Russian withdrawal and a counter offensive by Ukrainian forces between November 9 and 11, almost all settlements in the Mykolaiv Oblast were retaken by Ukraine. The exceptions are Pokrovka as well as the other settlements on the Kinburn Peninsula, including Vasylivka, were the only remaining Russian-controlled areas in Mykolaiv Oblast.

== Nature ==
Vasylivka is located within the Biloberezhia Sviatoslav National Park, in the Dnieper estuary.

== Demographics ==
As of the 2001 Ukrainian census, Vasylivka had a population of 382 people. The linguistic composition of the settlement was as follows:

Native languages in Vasylivka
	percent
Ukrainian	89.8%
Russian	10.2%
others	0.0%
