= Krasne, Mykolaiv Raion, Mykolaiv Oblast =

Town in Mykolaiv Oblast, Ukraine

Coordinates: 46°49′26″N 31°23′46″E

Krasne (Ukrainian: Красне) is a town in Mykolaiv Oblast, Ukraine.

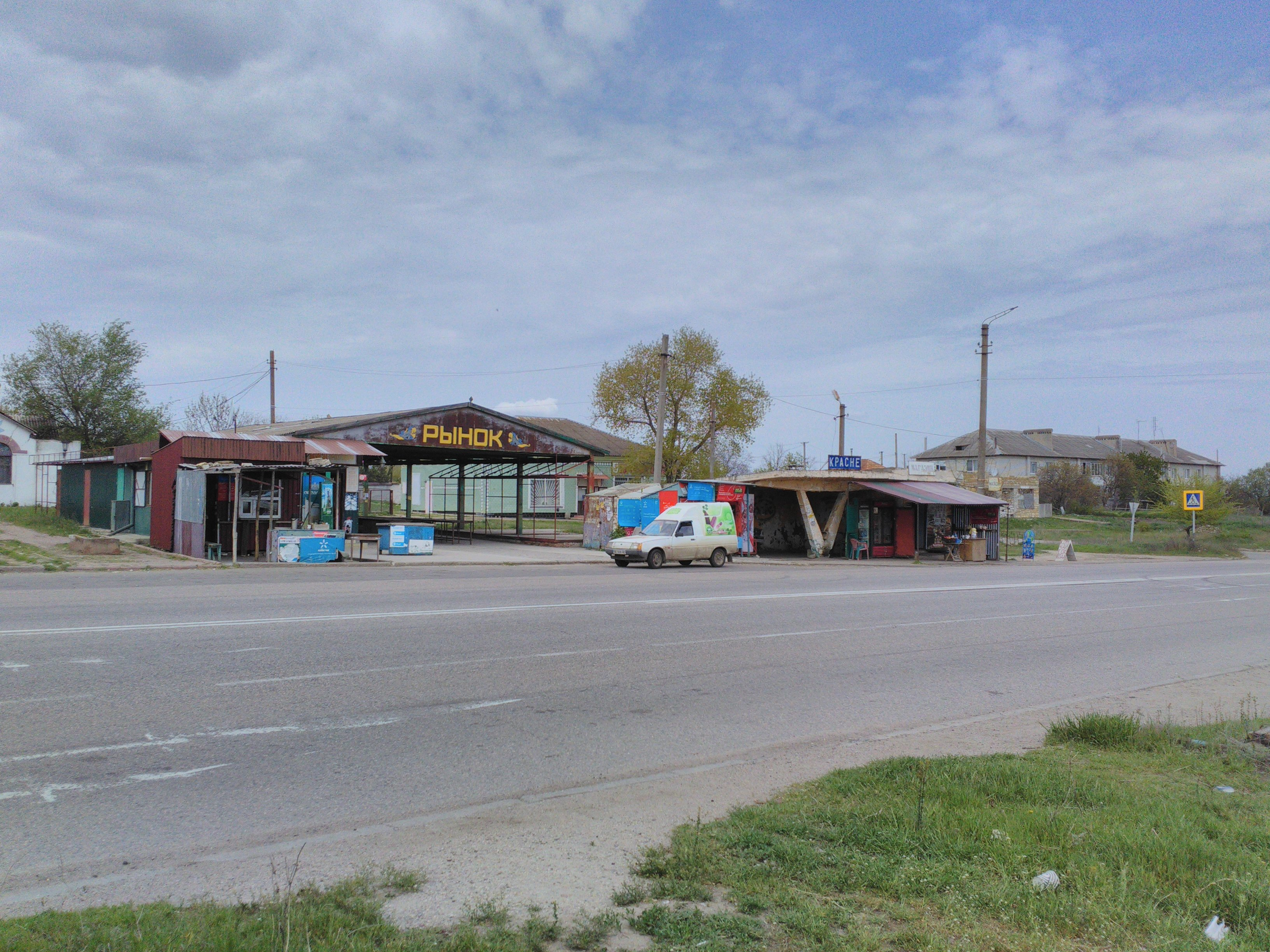
Krasne

== Geography ==
Krasne is located west of Mykolaiv and north of Ochakiv.
