= Kinburn Peninsula =

Black Sea peninsula

- Peninsula
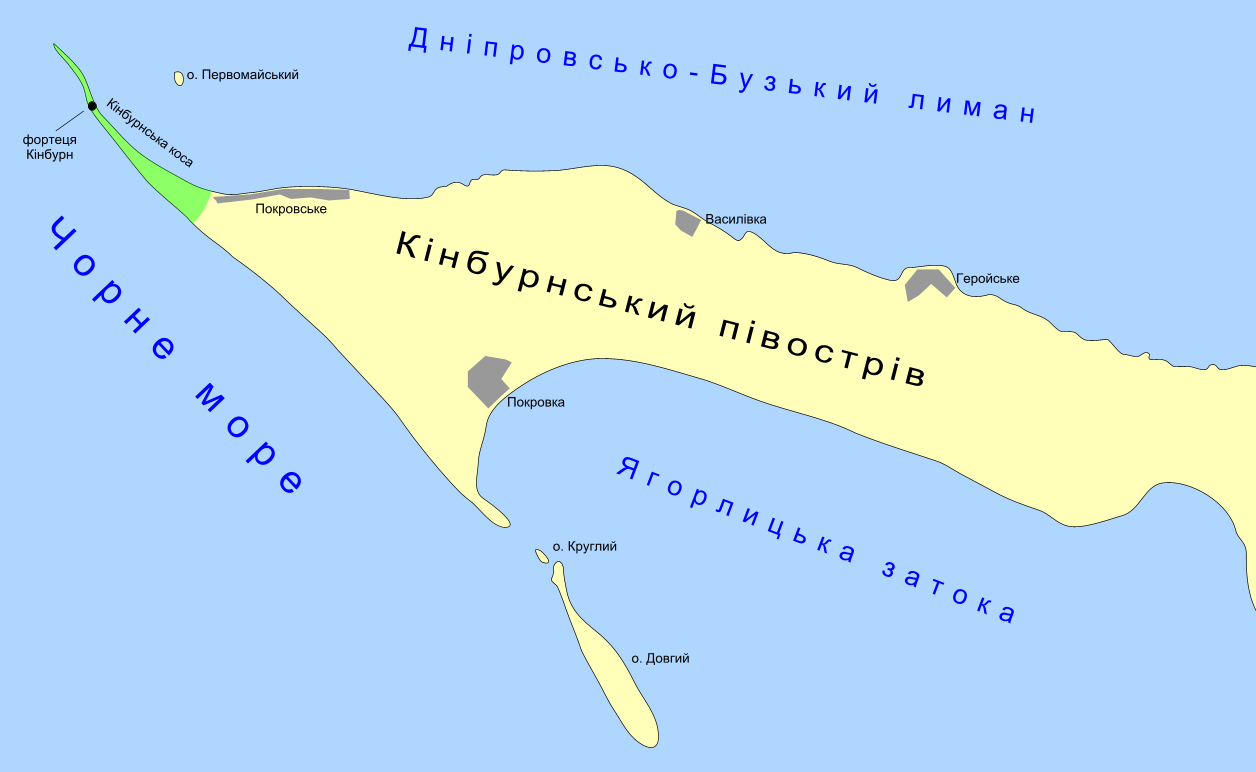
- A map of Kinburn Peninsula

- Location within Kherson Oblast Location within Ukraine
- Interactive map of Kinburn Peninsula
- Coordinates: 46°30′27″N 31°46′44″E
- Location: Southern Ukraine

Dimensions
  - Length: 40 kilometres (25 mi)
  - Width: 10 kilometres (6.2 mi)

The Kinburn Peninsula (Ukrainian: Кінбурнський півострів, romanized: Kinburnskyi pivostriv, Russian: Кинбурнский полуостров, romanized: Kinburnskiy poluostrov, Turkish: Kılburun) is a peninsula in Southern Ukraine, which separates the Dnieper–Bug estuary from the Black Sea. Administratively the peninsula is divided between two regions: Mykolaiv Oblast and Kherson Oblast, population 1,450. It is part of the Ivory Coast of Sviatoslav National Nature Park. Since April 2022, the Kinburn Peninsula has been fully occupied by Russian forces.

== Etymology ==
Etymology comes from Turkish Kılburun, literally 'nose (land strip) [as subtle as a] hair'.

== Geography ==
The western tip of the peninsula extends into the Kinburn Spit.

To the south is a pair of islands, Dovhyi and Kruhlyi; both belong administratively to the Mykolaiv Raion of Mykolaiv Oblast.

The peninsula includes the villages of Pokrovka, Pokrovske and Vasylivka, in Mykolaiv Oblast, and Heroiske, in the Kherson Oblast.

== Nature ==
Many species on the peninsula have value in conservation, as many are listed on the Red Data Book of Ukraine.

In recent years, the peninsula has been particularly vulnerable to climate change due to its fragile geology and human impact. Sheep farming during the early years of the peninsula degraded the steppe's vegetation and exposed sandy soils, and an attempt was made in the mid-20th century to create artificial pine forest plantations within the peninsula to stabilize the sands. Since the start of the warfare in 2022, severe stress has been put on Kinburn's ecosystem, with many fire outbreaks being recorded.

== History ==
In the 2nd millennium BC, the Nymphaion transgression submerged a sandy plain in the lower Dnipro, and later sea withdrawal created the Dnipro-Buh estuary. The present-day peninsula was formed about 1,500 to 2,000 years ago. In antiquity, the peninsula was known as Hileia, which was described by Herodotus, who portrayed the area as a remote, uninhabited wooded land where Hercules lost his horses and where the Scythian sage Anacharsis was killed.

The Battle of Kinburn was fought on 12 October (N.S.)/1 October (O.S.) 1787 as part of the Russo-Turkish War (1787–1792).

The Battle of Kinburn was fought on 17 October 1855 as part of the Crimean War.
