= 801st Special Marine Detachment (Ukraine) =

801st Combat Divers Center
- 801-й окремий підводний протидиверсійний загін
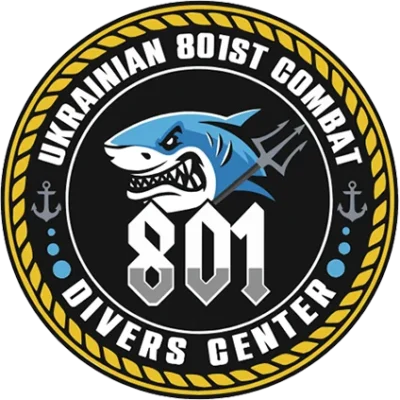
- Unit Insignia
- Country: Ukraine
- Branch: Ukrainian Navy
- Type: Special operations
- Role: Naval marine warfare
- Part of: Armed Forces of Ukraine
- Garrison/HQ: Odessa
- Engagements: Russo-Ukrainian War: War in Donbas; 2022 Russian invasion of Ukraine

Insignia
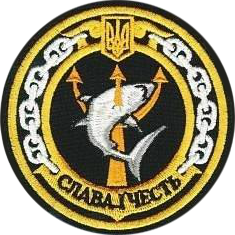
- Former Insignia

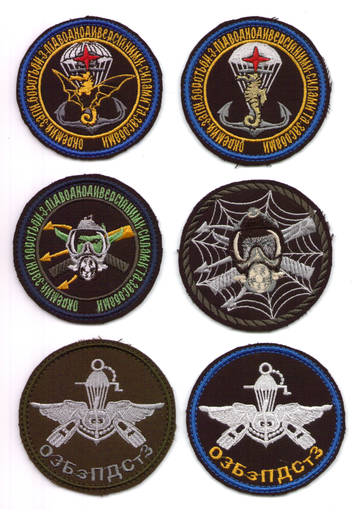
- Patches of the unit's squads

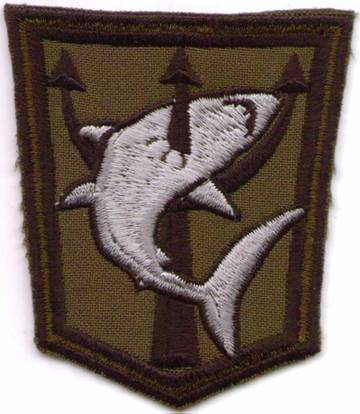
- Arm patch

The 801st Combat Divers Center is a unit of the Ukrainian Navy and is concerned with underwater special operations as well as combat reconnaissance operations. It is currently based at Odesa and has taken part in multiple engagements during the Russo-Ukrainian War.

== History ==
It was former based at Sevastopol but during the Russian Invasion of Crimea, only seven servicemen from the 80 personnel returned to Ukraine while the rest defected to Russia, the unit was then transferred to *Odessa.

The unit took part in the War in Donbass. On March 2, 2015, the reconnaissance group of the detachment took part in a battle in the village of Pishchevyk against Russian backed separatists. Two soldiers of the detachment (Oleksandr Streliuk and Oleg Storozhenko) were killed by a grenade attack on their vehicle while inspecting an outpost and two were wounded.

In January 2018, unit underwent rigorous training exercises with other units. On December 6, 2021, the unit received a combat flag from the President of Ukraine.

The unit took part in multiple engagements during the Russo-Ukrainian war with a soldier of the regiment (Oleksandr Oleksiiovych Tarasyuk) being killed in action on February 24, 2022, near Ochakiv.

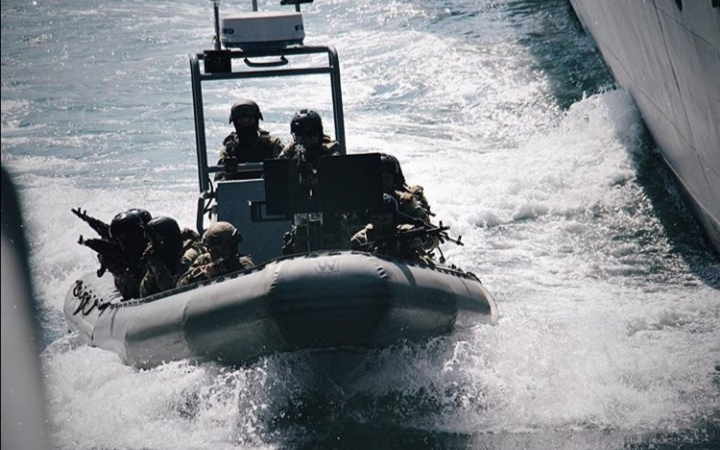
801st PDSS detachment training in Odessa

== Roles ==
The main tasks of the unit include the protection of naval bases, anti-sabotage operations, counterterrorism and anti-piracy operations. Following are the tasks of the unit.

- Search and Destruction of enemy reconnaissance and sabotage bases.
- Protection of ports, ships, hydraulics and other structures
- Boarding of ships and anti-hijacking operations
- Maintaining coordination with other agencies
- Demining and inspection operations
- Peacekeeping operations

=== Selection and Training ===
Selection to the unit takes place in four steps:

- Pressure endurance test
- Interview
- Physical training (Cooper test in addition to regular training standards)
- Psychological test

The candidates must be active or former military personnel.

== Sources ==
- 801 окремий загін ПДСЗ
- Книга пам'яті загиблих
- 801 ОЗБ ПДСЗ
- Медіадень з протидиверсійним загоном ВМС України
- "Навчання бійців 801-го протидиверсійного загону ВМС ЗС України". ukrmilitary.com. Ukrainian Military. 2018-01-28. Archived from the original on 29 January 2018.
