= Heroiske, Kherson Oblast =

Village in Kherson Oblast, Ukraine

Heroiske Геройське
- Village
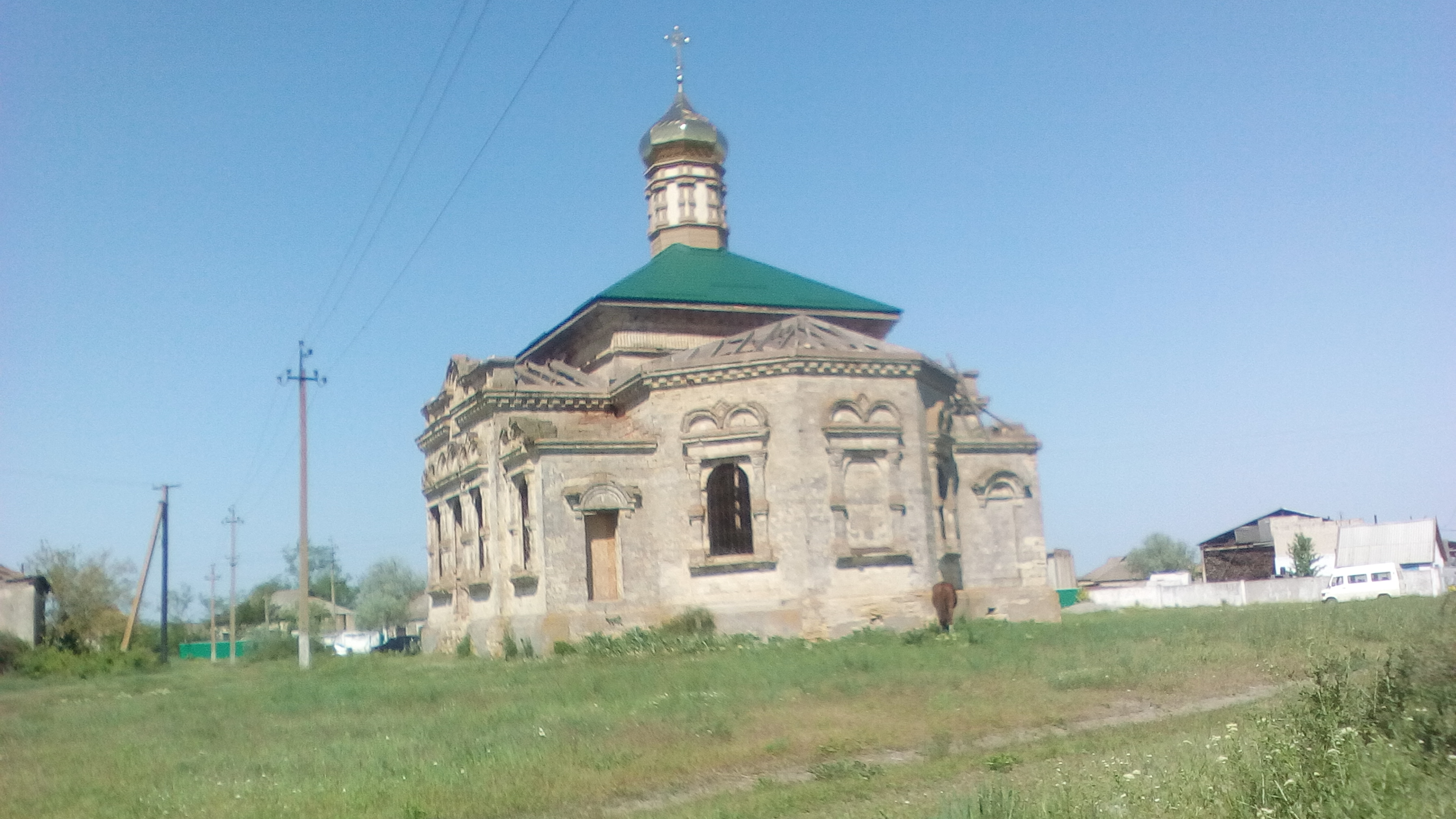
- Aerial view
- Interactive map of Heroiske
- Location in Kherson Oblast Heroiske (Ukraine)
- Coordinates: 46°30′35″N 31°54′04″E
- Country: Ukraine
- Oblast: Kherson Oblast
- Raion: Skadovsk Raion
- Elevation: 4 m (13 ft)
- Time zone: UTC+2 (EET)
  - Summer (DST): UTC+3 (EEST)

Heroiske (Ukrainian: Геройське) is a village (selo) on the Kinburn Peninsula in Skadovsk Raion, Kherson Oblast, southern Ukraine.

== Russo-Ukrainian War ==
The 2022 Russian invasion of Ukraine that resulted from the escalating Russo-Ukrainian War led to Heroiske being occupied by Russian forces during the opening days of the invasion.

== Administrative status ==
Until 18 July 2020, Heroiske belonged to Hola Prystan Raion. The raion was abolished in July 2020 as part of the administrative reform of Ukraine, which reduced the number of raions of Kherson Oblast to five. The area of Hola Prystan Raion was merged into Skadovsk Raion.

== Demographics ==
According to the 1989 Soviet census, the population of the village was 643 people, of whom 328 were men and 315 women.

According to the 2001 Ukrainian census, 670 people lived in the village.

=== Languages ===
According to the 2001 census, the primary languages of the inhabitants of the village were:

Language	Percentage
Ukrainian	90.45 %
Russian	9.25 %
Belarusian	0.15 %
