= Voskresenske =

Rural locality in Mykolaiv Oblast, Ukraine

Voskresenske Воскресенське
- Rural settlement
- Location within Mykolaiv Oblast
- Coordinates: 47°0′54″N 32°8′34″E
- Country: Ukraine
- Oblast: Mykolaiv Oblast
- Raion: Mykolaiv Raion

Population (2022)
  - Total: 4,659
- Time zone: UTC+2 (EET)
  - Summer (DST): UTC+3 (EEST)

Voskresenske (Ukrainian: Воскресенське, Russian: Воскресенское) is a rural settlement in Mykolaiv Raion in the south of Mykolaiv Oblast, Ukraine. It hosts the administration of Voskresenske settlement hromada, one of the hromadas of Ukraine. Population: 4,275 (2024 estimate); 4,659 (2022 estimate).

Voskresenske is located on the left bank of the Southern Bug and is adjacent to the city of Mykolaiv.

== History ==
The settlement was founded in 1790 as Horochivka and in 1793 was renamed Voskresensk. It was an admiralty settlement and belonged to Kherson Governorate. Between 1864 and 1900, it belonged to Nikolayev Military Governorate, which was a part of Kherson Governorate. In December 1920, Kherson Governorate was renamed Nikolayev Governorate, and in 1921 it was merged into Odessa Governorate. In 1923, governorates were abolished in the Ukrainian Soviet Socialist Republic. Mykolaiv Raion, with the administrative center in Mykolaiv, was established, and Voksresensk belonged to Mykolaiv Raion of Mykolaiv Okruha. In 1925, the governorates were abolished, and okruhas were directly subordinated to Ukrainian SSR. In 1930, okruhas were abolished, and Mykolaiv Raion was abolished as well. Voskresensk was transferred to Varvarivka Raion. On 27 February 1932, Odessa Oblast was established, and the area was transferred to Odessa Oblast. On 22 September 1937, Mykolaiv Oblast was established on lands which previously belonged to Dnipropetrovsk and Odessa Oblasts, and Varvarivka Raion became part of newly created Mykolaiv Oblast. In 1939, Mykolaiv Rural Raion (sometimes referred to as Mykolaiv Raion) was established with the center in the city of Mykolaiv. During World War II, an Einsatzgruppen murdered Jews in a mass execution. On 12 September 1944, Mykolaiv Raion was renamed Zhovtneve Raion, and the administrative center of the raion was transferred from Mykolaiv to the town of Zhovtneve. In 1947, Voskresensk was renamed Voskresenske. In 1956, Voskresenske was given urban-type settlement status. On 19 May 2016, Zhovtneve Raion was renamed Vitovka Raion conform to the law prohibiting names of Communist origin.

Until 18 July 2020, Voskresenske belonged to Vitovka Raion. The raion was abolished in July 2020 as part of the administrative reform of Ukraine, which reduced the number of raions of Mykolaiv Oblast to four. The area of Vitovka Raion was merged into Mykolaiv Raion. On 26 January 2024, a new law entered into force which abolished the status of urban-type settlement status, and Voskresenske became a rural settlement.

== Economy ==
Most inhabitants commute for jobs to nearby Mykolaiv.

=== Transportation ===
The closest railway station is in Horokhivka, 2 kilometres (1.2 mi) south of the settlement.
