= Ochakiv Raion =

Former subdivision of Mykolaiv Oblast, Ukraine

Ochakiv Raion Очаківський район
- Raion
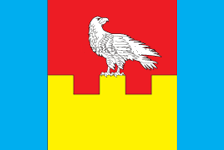
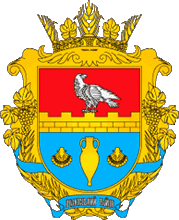
- Flag Coat of arms

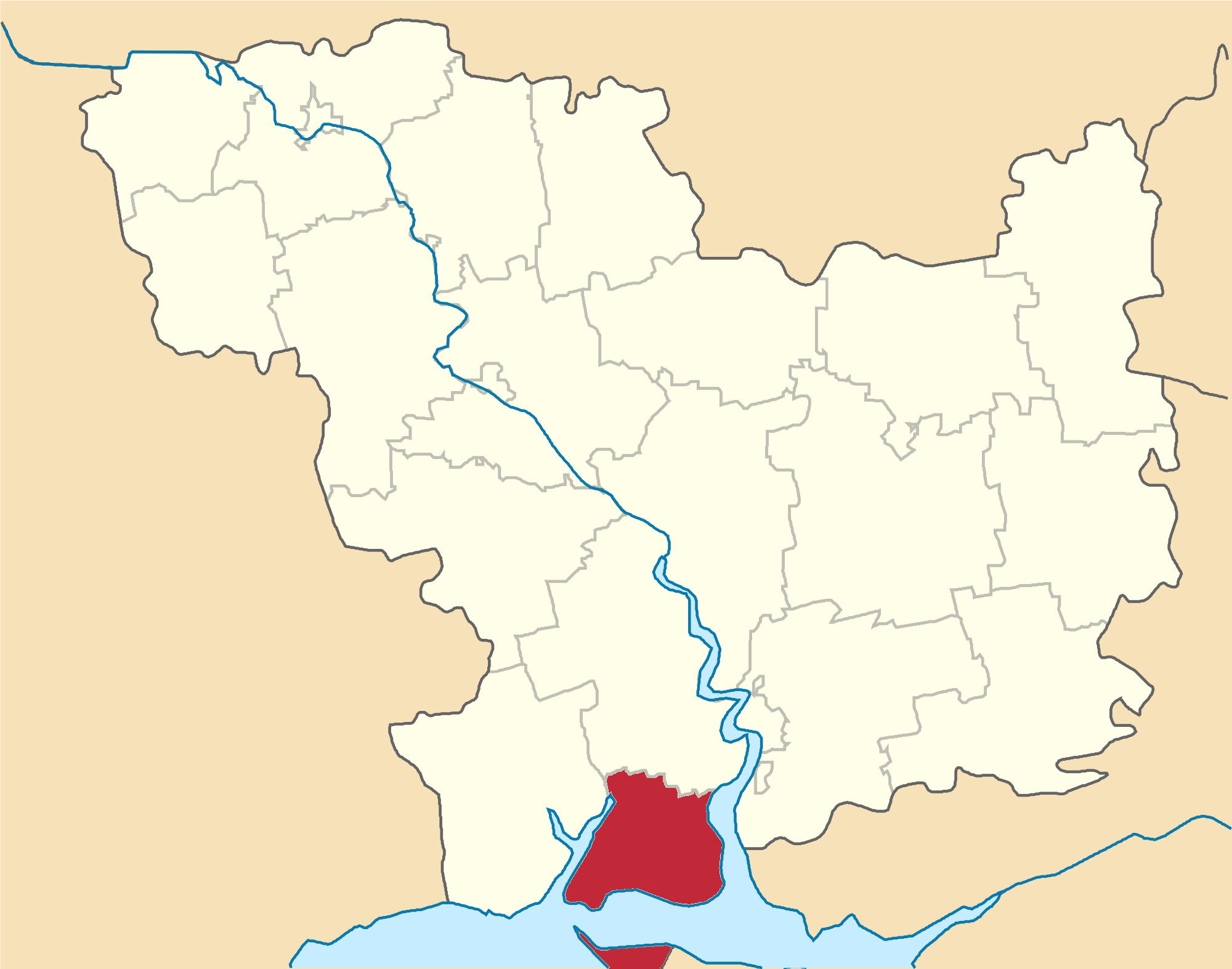
- Coordinates: 46°40′42″N 31°43′42″E
- Country: Ukraine
- Oblast: Mykolaiv Oblast
- Disestablished: 18 July 2020
- Admin. center: Ochakiv
- Subdivisions: List: 0 — city councils; 0 — settlement councils; 11 — rural councils; Number of localities: 0 — cities; 0 — urban-type settlements; 29 — villages; 1 — rural settlements

Government
  - Governor: Oleksandr Rosynets

Area
  - Total: 1,490 km^{2} (580 sq mi)

Population (2020)
  - Total: 14,832 ▼
  - Density: 9.95/km^{2} (25.8/sq mi)
- Time zone: UTC+02:00 (EET)
  - Summer (DST): UTC+03:00 (EEST)
- Postal index: 57515—57555
- Area code: +380 5167

Ochakiv Raion (Ukrainian: Очаківський район) was a subdivision of Mykolaiv Oblast of Ukraine. Its administrative center was the city of Ochakiv, which was incorporated separately as a city of oblast significance and did not belong to the raion. The raion was abolished on 18 July 2020 as part of the administrative reform of Ukraine, which reduced the number of raions of Mykolaiv Oblast to four. The area of Ochakiv Raion was merged into Mykolaiv Raion. The last estimate of the raion population was 14,832 (2020 est.)

At the time of disestablishment, the raion consisted of two hromadas,

- Chornomorka rural hromada with the administration in the selo of Chornomorka;
- Kutsurub rural hromada with the administration in the selo of Kutsurub.
