= Lustdorf =

Microdistrict of Odesa, Ukraine

Lustdorf Люстдорф
- Microdistrict of Odesa
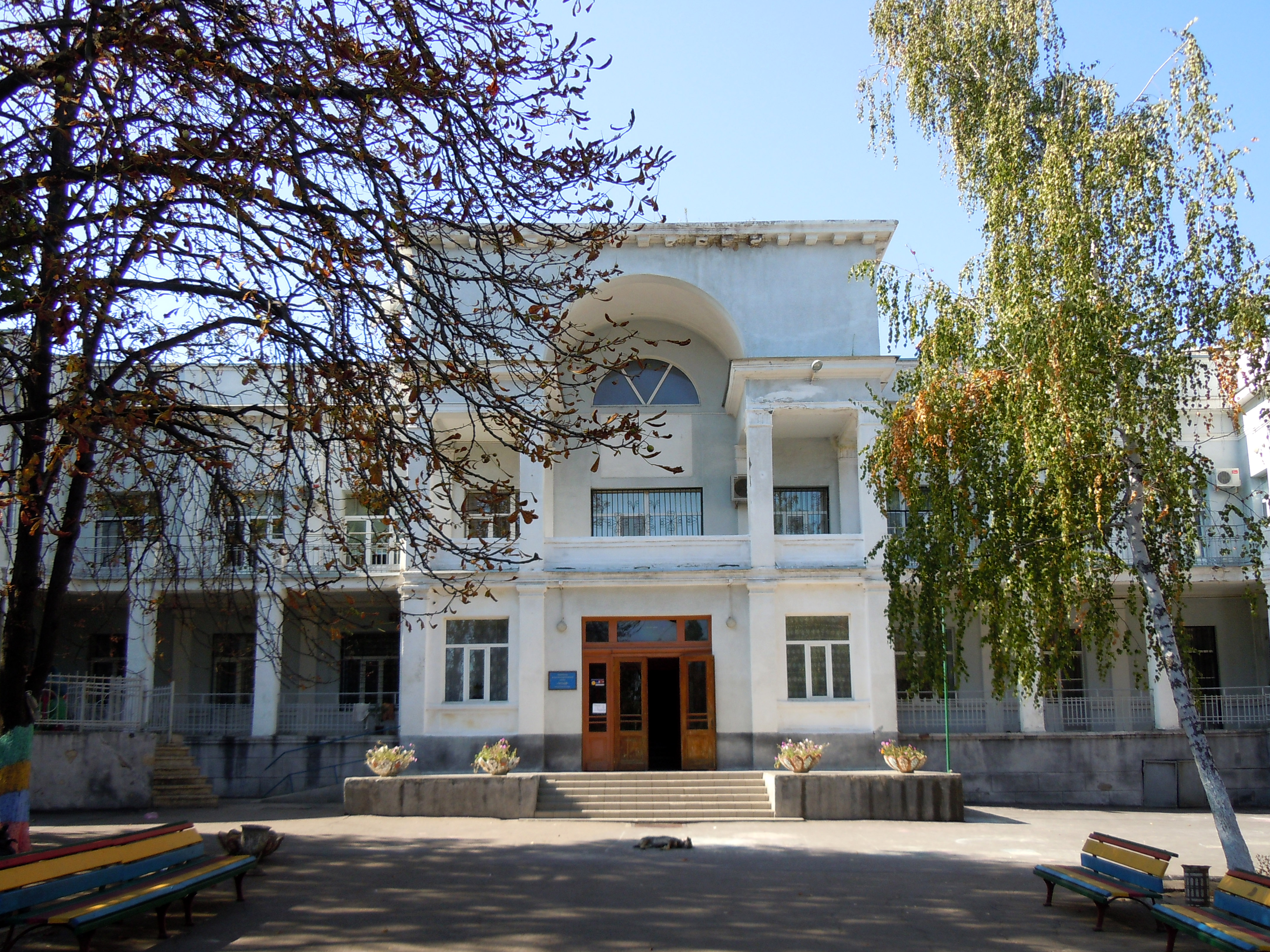

- Location within Odesa Oblast Location within Ukraine
- Coordinates: 46°20′59″N 30°42′09″E
- Country: Ukraine
- Oblast: (Odesa Oblast) Odesa
- Raion: Odesa
- Established: 1805

Lustdorf (Ukrainian: Люстдорф, romanized: Liustdorf), formerly known as Chornomorka (Ukrainian: Чорноморка; Russian: Черноморка, romanized: Chernomorka), is a spa town and microdistrict of Odesa, Ukraine.

== History ==
Lustdorf was founded by Black Sea German colonists in 1805. By the time it was placed under the administration of Großliebenthal in 1886, it had 717 residents. The village was connected to the Odesa Tram in 1882, and was among the wealthier settlements in the surrounding region during the early 20th century. On February 1, 1945, the village was named Chornomorka. In the 1990s, the historical name Lustdorf was restored to the village.

Lustdorf was granted the right to self-governance by the Odesa City Council in 2008. It is a spa town.

One of the training bases of the Chornomorets football club is located here, as well as a 500-seat stadium reconstructed in 2006, where the Chornomorets youth team plays its home games.
