= Dnieper–Bug estuary =

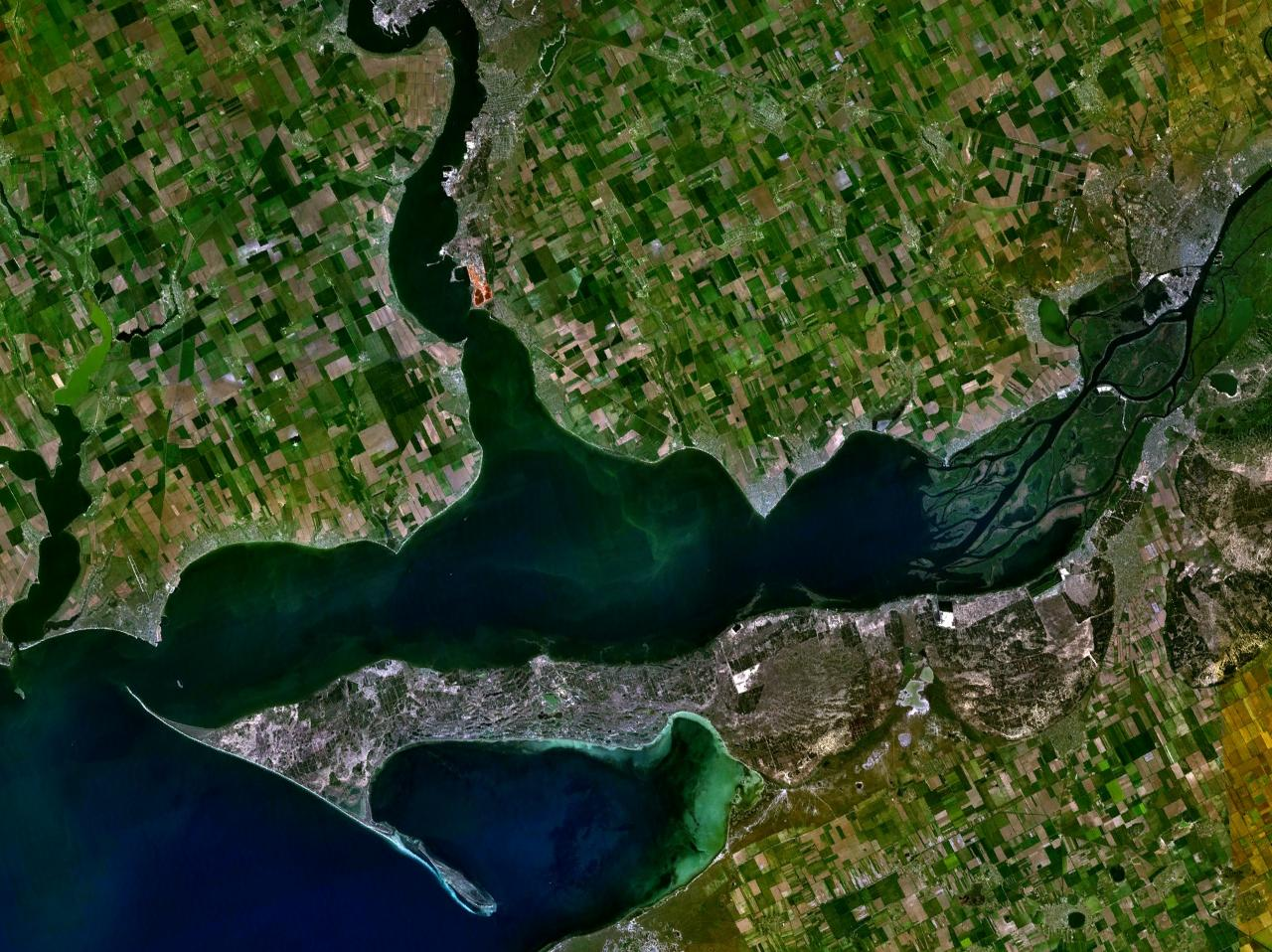
- Satellite view of the Dnieper–Bug estuary

- Location within Ukraine Location within Mykolaiv Oblast Location within Black Sea
- Location: Ukraine
- Coordinates: 46°37′N 31°57′E
- Type: estuary
- Primary inflows: Dnieper, Southern Bug
- Basin countries: Ukraine
- Max. length: 63 km (39 mi)
- Max. width: 17 km (11 mi)
- Surface area: 1,006.3 km^{2} (388.5 sq mi)
- Average depth: 4–6 m (13–20 ft)
- Max. depth: 12 m (39 ft)
- Settlements: Ochakiv, Mykolaiv

The Dnieper–Bug estuary (Ukrainian: Дніпровсько-Бузький лиман, romanized: Dniprovsko-Buzkyi lyman), also called the Dniprovska Gulf, is an open estuary, or liman, of two rivers: the Dnieper and the Southern Bug (also called the Boh River). It is located on the northern coast of the Black Sea and is separated from it by the Kinburn Spit and the Cape of Ochakiv.

== Description ==
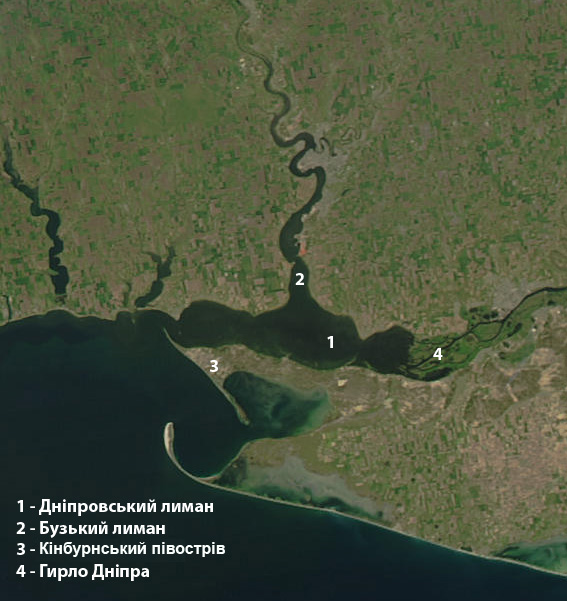
1 – Dnieper estuary; 2 – Southern Bug (Boh) estuary; 3 – Kinburn peninsula; 4 – Dnieper mouth

The estuary includes two parts: the wide Dnieper estuary (55 km long, up to 17 km wide), and the narrower Bug estuary (47 km long, from 5 to 11 km wide). The average depth is 6–7 metres (20–23 ft) and the maximum depth 12 metres (39 ft).

The estuary is important for transport, recreation, and fisheries. Its most important port is Ochakiv.

== Historical events ==
The estuary was a naval battleground in the Russo-Turkish War of 1787–1792. A key event in that war was the Siege of Ochakov, while naval battles – which involved the Russian Dnieper Flotilla, John Paul Jones deep-water fleet and the Ottoman Navy – included the First Battle of the Liman on June 7, 1788 and the Second Battle of the Liman on June 16 and 17.

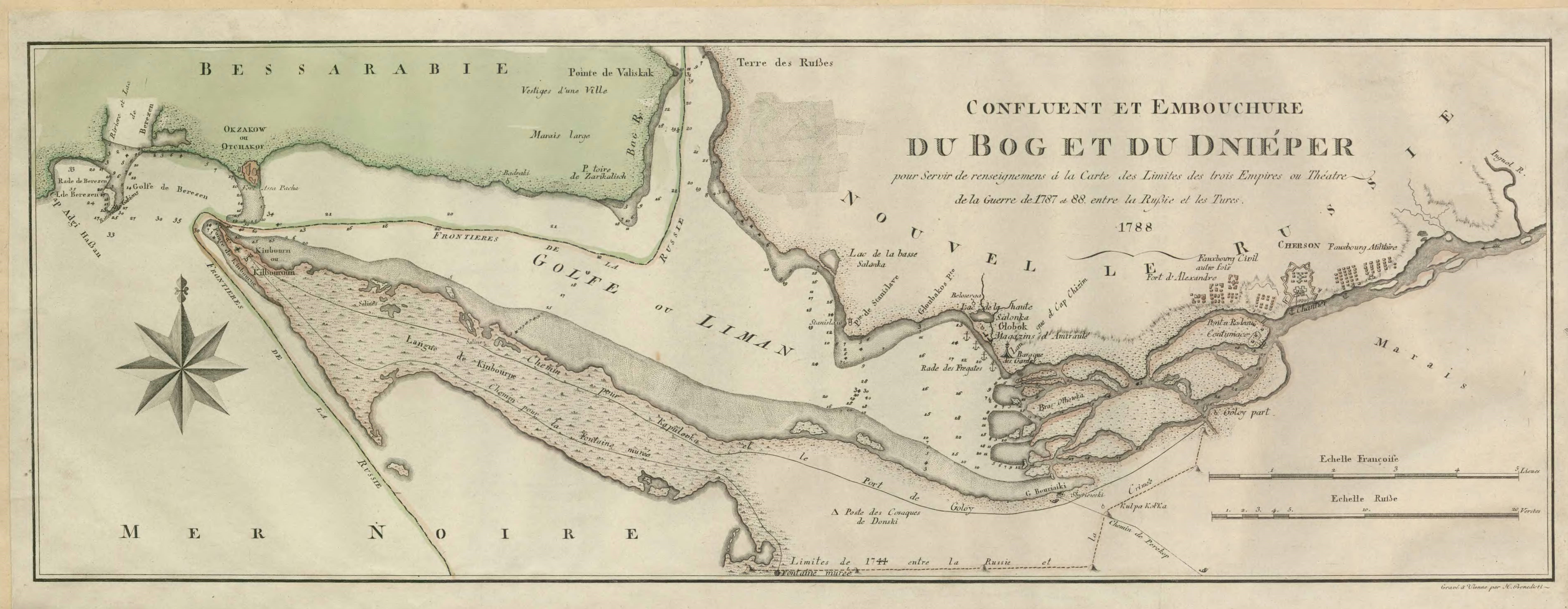
Map of the estuary created during the Russo-Turkish War of 1787-1792

== Key landmarks ==
The ruins of Pontic Olvia are located on the right bank of the Southern Bug (Boh River), right at its mouth.

There is an artificial island which is often mistaken for Berezan Island, but it is actually Kozachyi Island.
