= Mykolaiv Raion =

Subdivision of Mykolaiv Oblast, Ukraine

Mykolaiv Raion Миколаївський район
- Raion
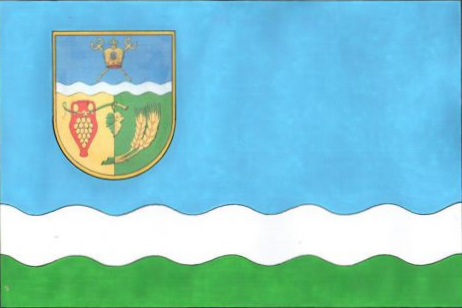
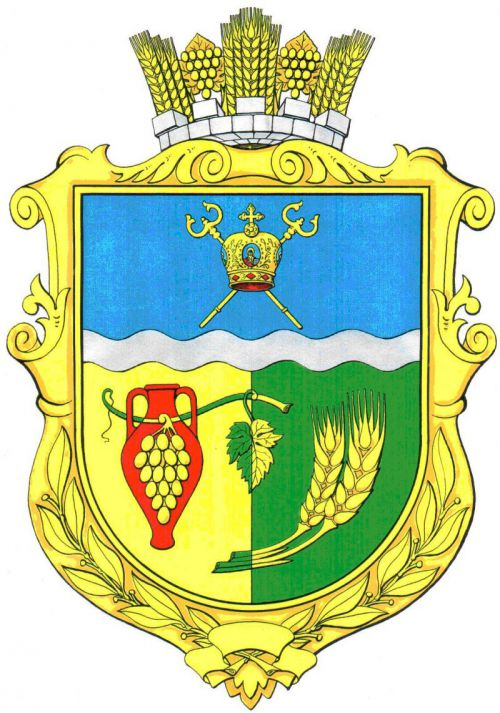
- Flag Coat of arms

- Coordinates: 47°3′38″N 31°41′0″E
- Country: Ukraine
- Oblast: Mykolaiv Oblast
- Admin. center: Mykolaiv
- Subdivisions: 19 hromadas

Government
  - Governor: Yuriy Serebryakov

Area
  - Total: 7,689 km^{2} (2,969 sq mi)

Population (2022)
  - Total: 636,832
  - Density: 82.82/km^{2} (214.5/sq mi)
- Time zone: UTC+02:00 (EET)
  - Summer (DST): UTC+03:00 (EEST)
- Postal index: 57101—57171
- Area code: +380 512

Mykolaiv Raion (Ukrainian: Миколаївський район, romanized: Mykolajivs'kyj rajon) is a raion (district) in Mykolaiv Oblast, Ukraine with a pre-war population of 636,832 (2022 estimate). Its administrative center is the city of Mykolaiv.

== History ==
In the 19th century, the area belonged to Kherson Governorate. After the Russian Revolution, the area underwent a series of administrative changes. In December 1920, it was renamed Nikolayev Governorate, and in 1921 it was merged into Odesa Governorate. In 1923, governorates were abolished in the Ukrainian Soviet Socialist Republic. As a result, Mykolaiv Raion of Mykolaiv Okruha was established, with the administrative center in Mykolaiv, which belonged to the raion. In 1925, governorates were abolished, and okruhas were directly subordinated to the Ukrainian SSR. In 1930, okruhas were abolished, including Mykolaiv Raion. Instead the area was transferred to Varvarivka Raion. On 27 February 1932, the area was transferred to the newly created Odesa Oblast. On 22 September 1937, Mykolaiv Oblast was established on lands which previously belonged to Dnipropetrovsk and Odesa Oblasts, and Varvarivka Raion became part of newly created Mykolaiv Oblast. On 8 August 1945, Shyrokolanivka Raion was established on the area which previously belonged to Varvarivka and Tylihulo-Berezanka Raions. The area thus became split between Varvarivka and Shyrokyi Lan Raions. On 7 June 1957, Shyrokyi Lan Raion was abolished, and split between Varvarivka and Veselynove Raions. In January 1963, Varvarivka Raion was abolished, and Mykolaiv Raion was re-established.

On 18 July 2020, as part of the administrative reform of Ukraine, the number of raions of Mykolaiv Oblast was reduced to four, and the area of Mykolaiv Raion was significantly expanded. Four abolished raions, Berezanka, Nova Odesa, Ochakiv, and Vitovka Raions, as well as the cities of Mykolaiv and Ochakiv, which were previously incorporated as a city of oblast significance and did not belong to any raion, were merged into Mykolaiv Raion. In 2001, population of the district was 34,675. The January 2020 estimate of the raion population was 29,389 (2020 est.)

== Subdivisions ==
=== Current ===
After the reform in July 2020, the raion consisted of 19 hromadas:

- Berezanka settlement hromada with the administration in the rural settlement of Berezanka, transferred from Berezanka Raion;
- Chornomorka rural hromada with the administration in the selo of Chornomorka, transferred from Ochakiv Raion;
- Halytsynove rural hromada with the administration in the selo of Halytsynove, transferred from Vitovka Raion;
- Kobleve rural hromada with the administration in the selo of Kobleve, transferred from Berezanka Raion;
- Kostiantynivka rural hromada with the administration in the selo of Kostiantynivka, transferred from Nova Odesa Raion;
- Kutsurub rural hromada with the administration in the selo of Kutsurub, transferred from Ochakiv Raion;
- Mishkovo-Pohorilove rural hromada with the administration in the selo of Mishkovo-Pohorilove, transferred from Vitovka Raion;
- Mykolaiv urban hromada with the administration in the city of Mykolaiv, transferred from the city of oblast significance of Mykolaiv;
- Nechaiane rural hromada with the administration in the selo of Nechaiane, retained from Mykolaiv Raion;
- Nova Odesa urban hromada with the administration in the city of Nova Odesa, transferred from Nova Odesa Raion;
- Ochakiv urban hromada with the administration in the city of Ochakiv, transferred from the city of oblast significance of Ochakiv;
- Olshanske settlement hromada with the administration in the rural settlement of Olshanske, retained from Mykolaiv Raion;
- Pervomaiske settlement hromada with the administration in the rural settlement of Zavodske, transferred from Vitovka Raion.
- Radsadivska rural hromada with the administration in the settlement of Radisnyi Sad, retained from Mykolaiv Raion;
- Shevchenkove rural hromada with the administration in the selo of Shevchenkove, transferred from Vitovka Raion;
- Stepove rural hromada with the administration in the selo of Stepove, retained from Mykolaiv Raion;
- Sukhyi Yelanets rural hromada with the administration in the selo of Sukhyi Yelanets, transferred from Nova Odesa Raion;
- Vesniane rural hromada with the administration in the settlement of Vesniane, retained from Mykolaiv Raion;
- Voskresenske settlement hromada with the administration in the rural settlement of Voskresenske, transferred from Vitovka Raion.

=== Before 2020 ===
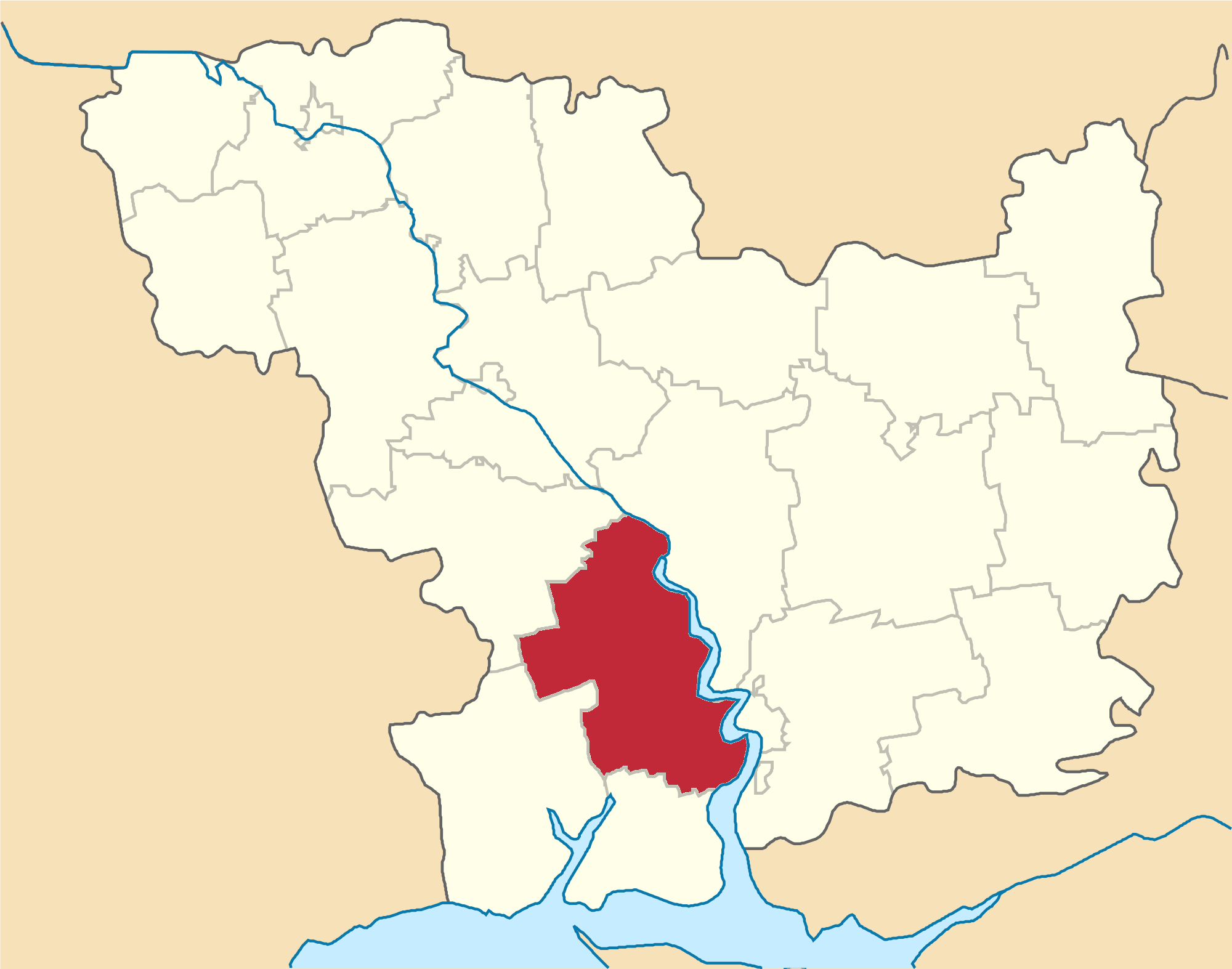
Mykolaiv Raion in Mykolaiv Oblast before 2020

Before the 2020 reform, the raion consisted of five hromadas,

- Nechaiane rural hromada with the administration in Nechaiane;
- Olshanske settlement hromada with the administration in Olshanske;
- Radsadivska rural hromada with the administration in Radisnyi Sad;
- Stepove rural hromada with the administration in Stepove;
- Vesniane rural hromada with the administration in Vesniane.
