= Ochakiv =

City in Mykolaiv Oblast, Ukraine

Ochakiv Очаків
- City
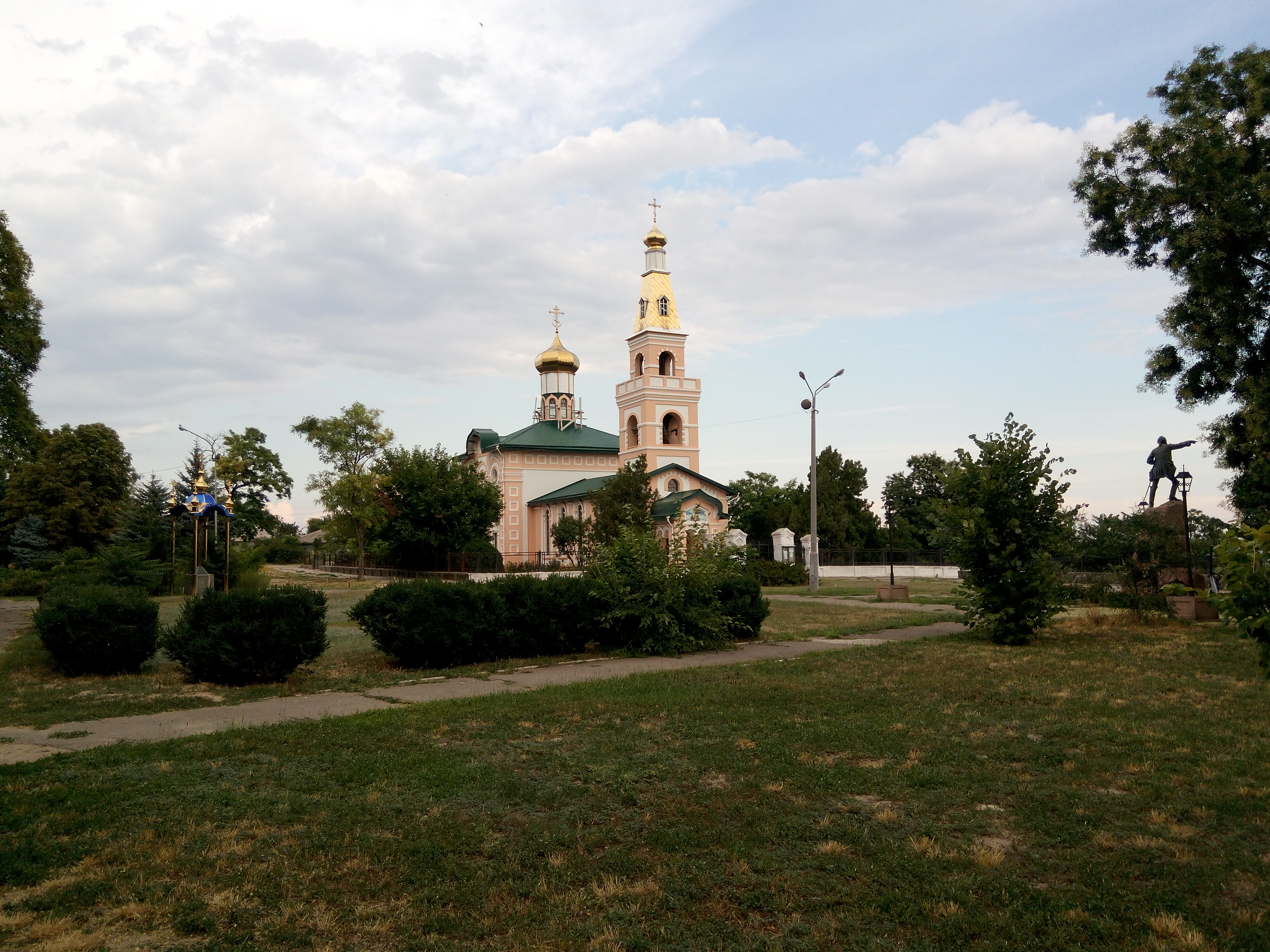
- Saint Nicholas Cathedral

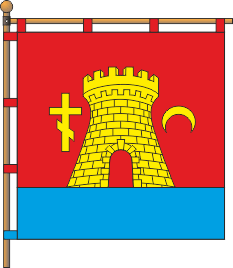
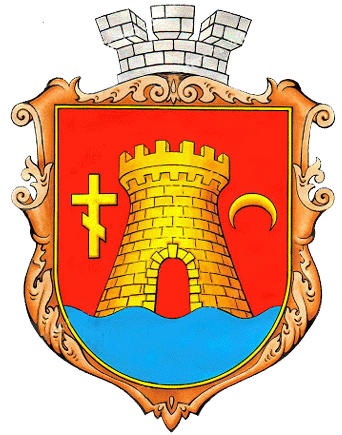
- Flag Coat of arms
- Interactive map of Ochakiv
- Location of Ochakiv Ochakiv (Ukraine) Ochakiv (Black Sea)
- Coordinates: 46°37′07″N 31°32′21″E
- Country: Ukraine
- Oblast: Mykolaiv Oblast
- Raion: Mykolaiv Raion
- Hromada: Ochakiv urban hromada
- Founded: 1492

Government
  - Mayor: Mykola Topchyi

Area
  - Total: 12.49 km^{2} (4.82 sq mi)

Population (2022)
  - Total: 13,663
  - Density: 1,094/km^{2} (2,833/sq mi)
- Time zone: UTC+2 (EET)
  - Summer (DST): UTC+3 (EEST)
- Postal code: 57500-57014
- Area code: +380 5154
- Website: mrada.ochakiv.info

Ochakiv (Ukrainian: Очаків, pronounced [oˈtʃɑkiu̯]), also known as Ochakov (Note: Russian: Очаков; Crimean Tatar: Özü; Ottoman Turkish: اوزی, romanized: Özi; Romanian: Oceacov or, archaically, Vozia) and Alektor (Ancient Greek: Ἀλέκτωρ), is a small city in Mykolaiv Raion, Mykolaiv Oblast (region) of southern Ukraine. It hosts the administration of Ochakiv urban hromada, one of the hromadas of Ukraine. Its population is 13,663 (2022 estimate). Of the 14,000 people who lived in Ochakiv before the war, only half remained.

For many years the city fortress served as a capital of the Ottoman province (eyalet) of Özu (Silistria).

== Geography ==
The city is located at the mouth of Dnieper, on the banks of the Dnieper-Bug Estuary. Between the Cape of Ochakiv (northern bank) and the Kinburn Spit (southern bank) there are only 3.6 km (2.2 miles). The Ochakiv and Kinburn fortresses controlled the entrance to Dnieper and Bug.

== History ==
=== Establishment and names ===
The strip of land on which Ochakiv is located was inhabited by Thracians and Scythians in ancient times. It was known as a part of Great Scythia. In the 7th and 6th centuries BC, Greek colonists had founded a commercial colony town, named Alektor, near the Thracian coast. Archaeological excavations also show that near the area was the old Milesian (ancient Greek) colony of Pontic Olbia; it is supposed that the same Greek expeditions settled Alektor.

In the 1st century BC, Alektor became a Roman colony and part of the Roman Empire. As a result of the migrations, the city fell and the inhabitants lived in small settlements built on the shores of the Bug and Dnieper Rivers.

During the Middle Ages the place was named Vozia by Romanians. The name is supposed to come from a plant known in Romanian as bozii or bozia (Sambucus ebulus), a medicinal herb frequently found there. The territory was a part of the Brodnici rule. It fell under Tatar domination in the time of the Mongol invasion of Europe.

Alexandru cel Bun (Alexander I, the Good), ruler of Moldavia (r. 1400–1432), and his ally Vytautas, Grand Duke of Lithuania (r. 1392–1430), freed the Vozia territory and a fortress was built again close to Alektor's ruins. Later the stronghold will be mentioned in Russian chronics as Dashev.

In the 14th century the Senarega brothers, Genovese merchants and warriors, had settled a castle at the place called "Lerici" very close to Vozia city. It was a good point for commerce with Romanians and Tatars, but the Senarega family's interference in Moldavia's internal affairs made the Moldavians from Cetatea Albă (today's Bilhorod-Dnistrovskyi) take the castle from them in 1455.

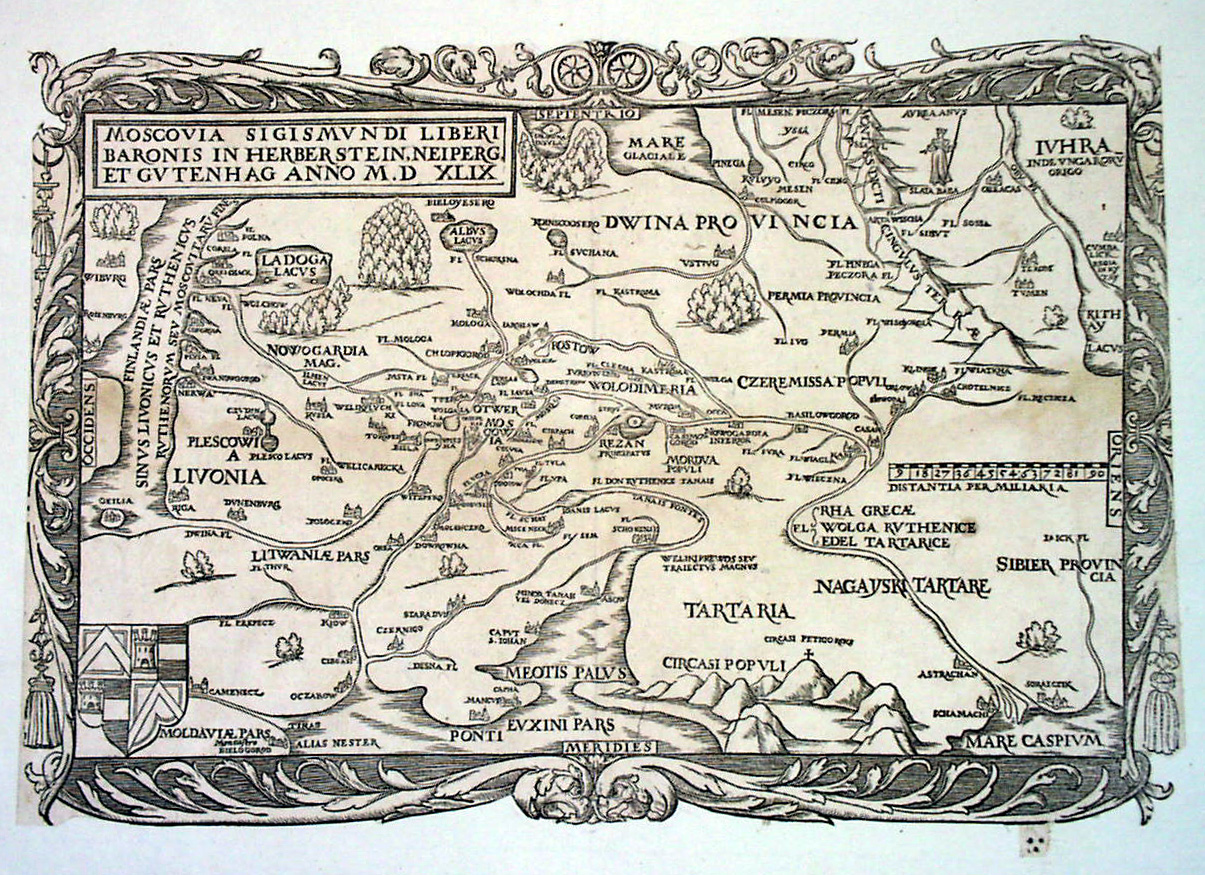
Sigismund von Herberstein places 'Oczakow' (today's "Ochakiv") on the coast of Black Sea (Ponti Evxini) in his 1549 map.

According to the İslâm Ansiklopedisi, the core of Özü fortress probably dates back to the military fortification built by the Crimean Khanate in the 1490s. This small Tatar castle, called Cankirman, must have definitely come under Ottoman rule after the Karaboğdan expedition of Suleiman the Magnificent in 1538. In some sources, it is stated that this place was built by Meñli I Giray in 1492 on an ancient Greek city called Alektor and was named Karakerman. After coming under Ottoman rule, the castle and the small settlement began to be mentioned in official Ottoman documents as "Cankirman also known as Özi". In Ottoman sources, Özü was used as the name of both the region and the Dnieper river.

In 1493, the fortress was taken by the cossacks of Bohdan Gliński. Due to its strategic location the fortress was a site of contest for a long time between Moldavia, Moldavia's ally Zaporizhian Sich, the Polish–Lithuanian Commonwealth, and the Ottoman Empire.

At a later date it became the centre of an Ottoman sanjak which included Khajidereh (today Ovidiopol), Khadjibey (Odesa), and Dubăsari, as well as some 150 villages, and Silistra Province, sometimes called Özi Province, to which it belonged. Khadjibey later became a sanjak centre of its own.

In 1600 Michael the Brave, Prince of Wallachia, took control of the city for a short time.

Giovanni Battista Malbi noted in 1620 that the town and the land of Vozia, even if ruled by the Tatars, were inhabited by Romanians, describing them as having the Orthodox religion and a corrupt Latin-Italian language, with Slavic influences, as in those times the Old Slav language was the church language in all Romanian countries. The same ethnic note was made by Niccolo Barsi from Lucca in the same century.

The 1720 map of Johann Baptist Homann where Oczakow also is known as Dziarcrimenda

Lawryn Piaseczynski, secretary of the Polish king Sigismund III Vasa, traveling with a diplomatic mission to Gazi Giray Khan, traversing the region of Cetatea Albă (Ak-Kerman) and the Vozia or Oceakov region, found only "Moldavian villages under the Tatar Khan's domination, ruled in his name by Nazyl Aga" ("sate moldoveneşti pe care le ţine hanul tătărăsc şi pe care le guvernează în numele lui sluga lui Nazyl aga") Similar notes were made by Giovanni Botero (1540–1617) in Relazioni universali (Venice 1591); Gian Lorenzo d'Anania in L'Universale fabbrica del Mondo, ovvero Cosmografia (Napoli 1573, Venice 1596 etc.) and Giovanni Antonio Magini (1555–1617), from Padua, în Geographie universae (Venice 1596).

Daniel Krman wrote that apart from the Turks and Tatars, the conquerors of Vozia, the city was inhabited by Moldavians (Romanians) and a number of Greek merchants.

Ochakiv was listed as one of the three chief towns of Yedisan in a 1701 book by English cartographer Herman Moll.

=== Russian conquest ===
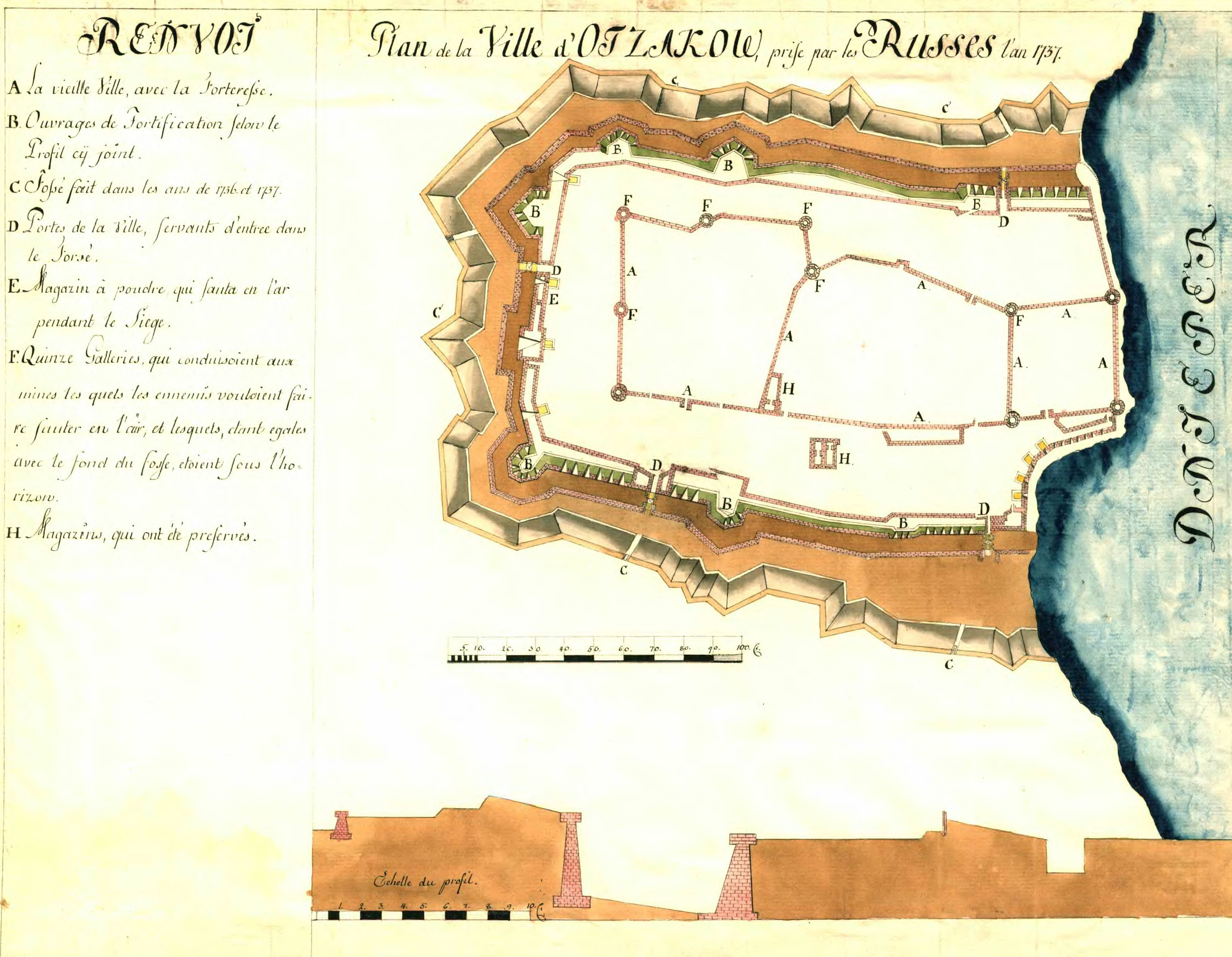
The town and fortress after its capture by the Russians in 1737

During the Russo-Turkish War (1735–1739), the Russian Empire, viewing the Ottoman fortress as the key for obtaining control of the Black Sea littoral, besieged it in 1737. Russian troops commanded by Marshal von Münnich took the fortress by storm (July 1737), but the following year Russia abandoned it, restoring it to Turkey in 1739. The 1737 siege became famous as the background to one of the tales of the fictional Baron Munchausen. The Russians would besiege Ochakiv in late July to 2 August 1771 during the Russo-Turkish War (1768–1774), but this time it had ended in failure.

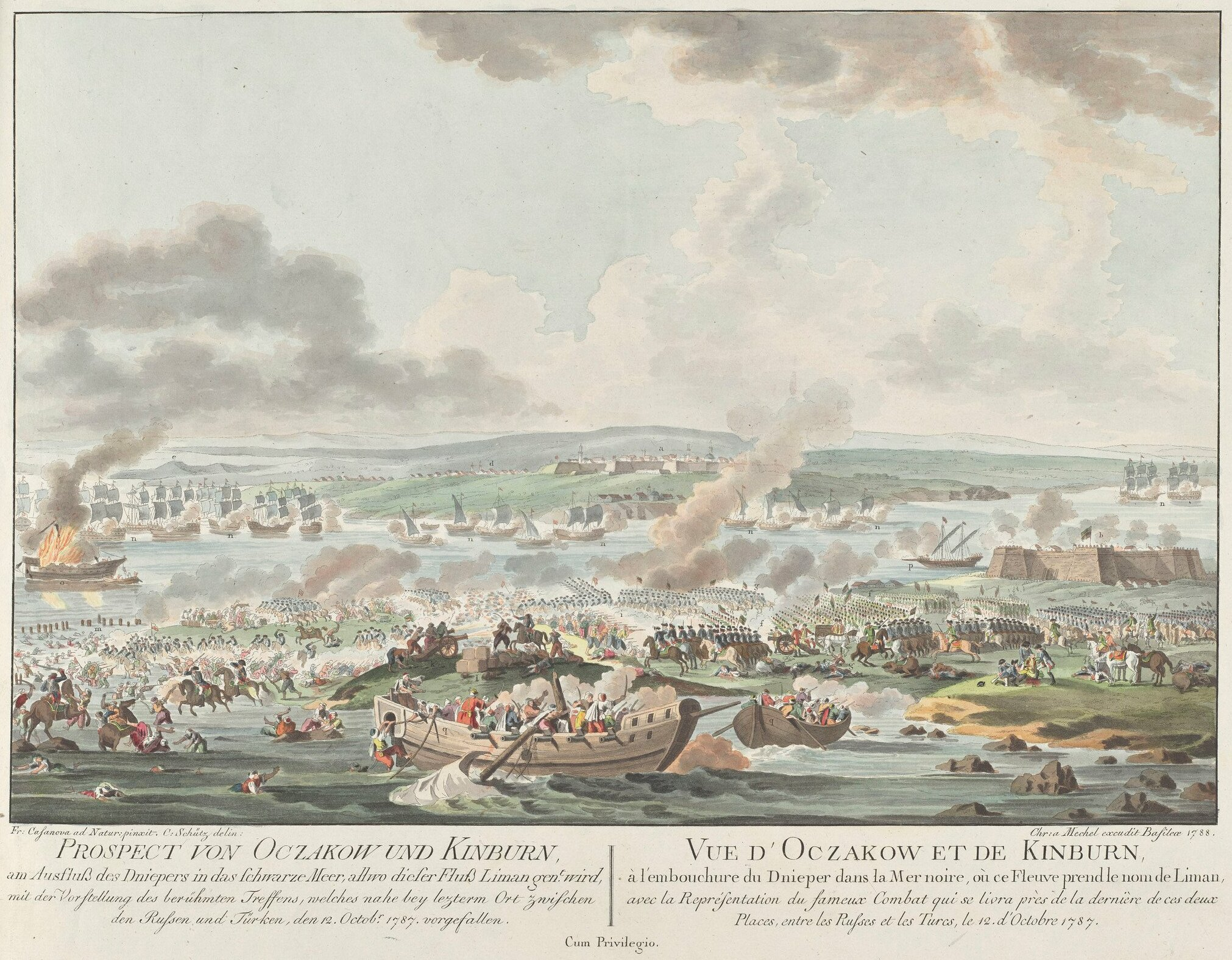
A view of the Battle of Kinburn near Ochakiv, on 12 October 1787

During the Russo-Turkish War of 1787–1792, Russian land forces under Alexander Suvorov and naval units commanded by John Paul Jones started a second siege of Ochakov, which began in the summer of 1788 and lasted six months. In December 1788, in temperatures of −23 °C (−9 °F), the Russians stormed the fortress, resulting in a terrible loss of life. The siege became the subject of a famous ode by Gavrila Derzhavin. The naval Battle of Ochakov (July 1788) took place alongside the city during the same campaign. The Treaty of Jassy of 1792 transferred Özi to the Russian Empire, which renamed it as Ochakov (Russian: Оча́ков).

Initially the Russian Empire planned to establish a "New Moldavia" as a point of attraction for the Romanians from Moldavia, Wallachia and other Romanian-speaking areas. Romanians became a minority in the area as a result of the Russian Empire's policy of Slavic settlement.

=== Anglo-French occupation ===
During the Crimean War the Kinburn Fortress opposite Ochakiv was bombarded by the Anglo-French fleet and captured on 17 October 1855, in the course of the Battle of Kinburn. The fortress remained in Anglo-French hands for the remaining months of the war, while the Russians abandoned Ochakiv and destroyed the fort located there. After that war the coastal defences around Ochakiv were rebuilt and strengthened.

=== Recent history ===
With the establishment of the Ukrainian statehood as the Ukrainian People's Republic the Ukrainian name of the city became official. Ochakiv was part of the Soviet Union's Ukrainian SSR and during World War II it was occupied by Romania between 1941 and 1944. This was the first time in the city's history that the ethnological and sociological research of Ochakiv's Romanians survivors were made by Anton Golopenția.

Until 18 July 2020, Ochakiv was incorporated as a city of oblast significance. It also served as the administrative center of Ochakiv Raion even though it did not belong to the raion. In July 2020, as part of the administrative reform of Ukraine, which reduced the number of raions of Mykolaiv Oblast to four, the city of Ochakiv was merged into Mykolaiv Raion.

== Present ==
Today Ochakiv is a resort town and a fishing port. The current estimated population is around 16,900 (as of 2001). Military personnel are about a third of the local population.

The town's main sight is the building of the Suvorov Museum, which served as a mosque in the 15th century. It was converted into the church of Saint Nicholas in 1804 and was reconstructed in Russian style in 1842.

Ochakiv is home to a Ukrainian Navy’s Maritime Operations Center, one of several buildings built by U.S. forces in the late 2010s. It was attacked in the Russian invasion of Ukraine.

Not far from the city is located the Historical-Archaeological Preserve "Olvia" and Berezan Island. On the Kinburn peninsula are located the National park "White Bank of Svyatoslav" and the "Volzhyn forest" of Black Sea Biosphere Preserve.

== Demographics ==
As of the 2001 Ukrainian census, Ochakiv had a population of 17,109 inhabitants. The ethnic and linguistic composition was as follows:

Ethnic groups in Ochakiv
	percent
Ukrainians	78.19%
Russians	18.38%
Belarusians	0.88%
Moldovans	0.56%
Armenians	0.33%
Bulgarians	0.19%
Poles	0.18%
Tatars	0.14%
Azerbaijanis	0.06%
others	1.09%

Native languages (2001)
	percent
Ukrainian	70.3%
Russian	28.5%
Moldovan	0.2%
Belarusian	0.2%
Armenian	0.2%
Gagauz	0.1%
others	0.3%

== Gallery ==
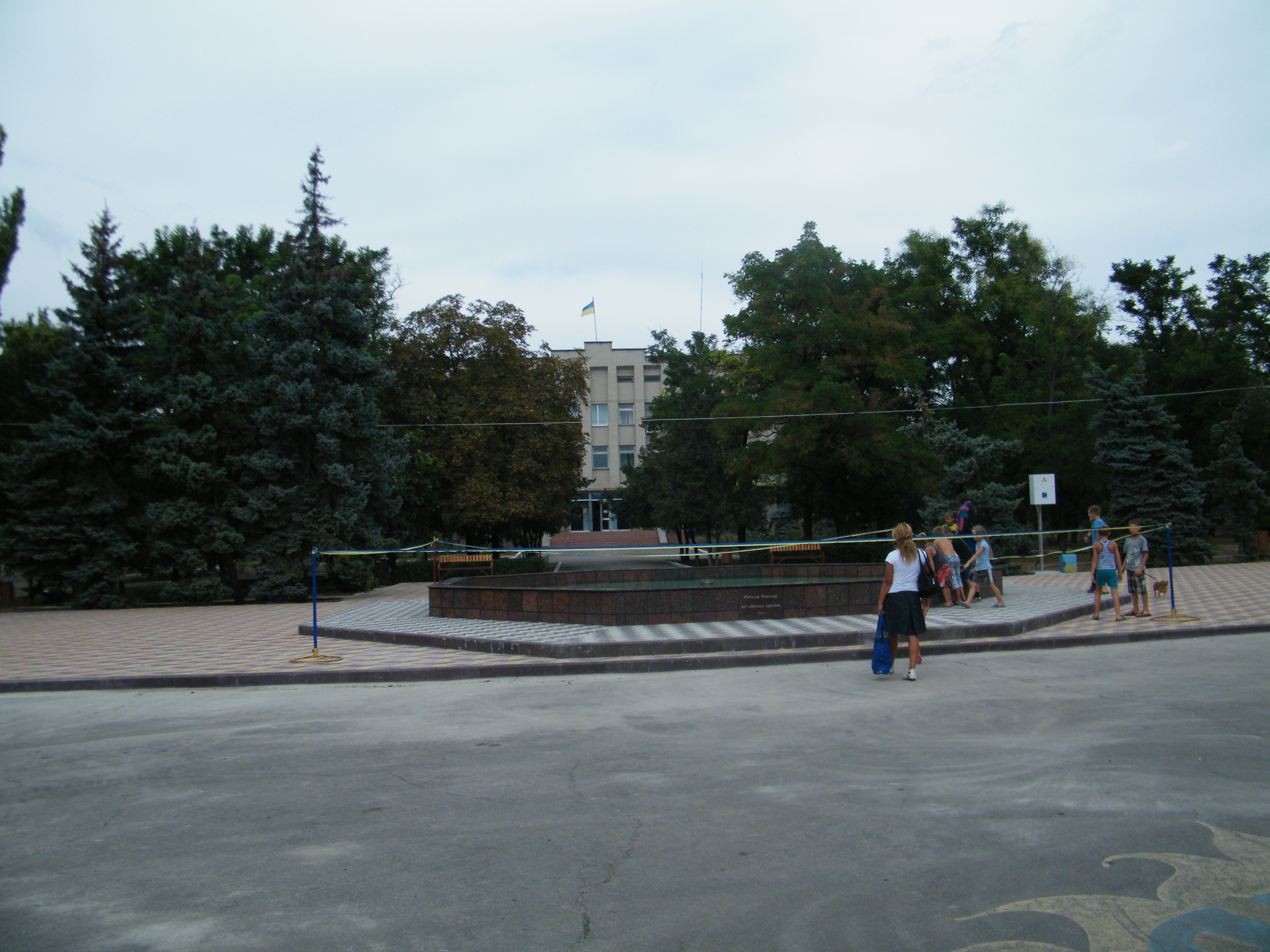
Ochakiv town centre

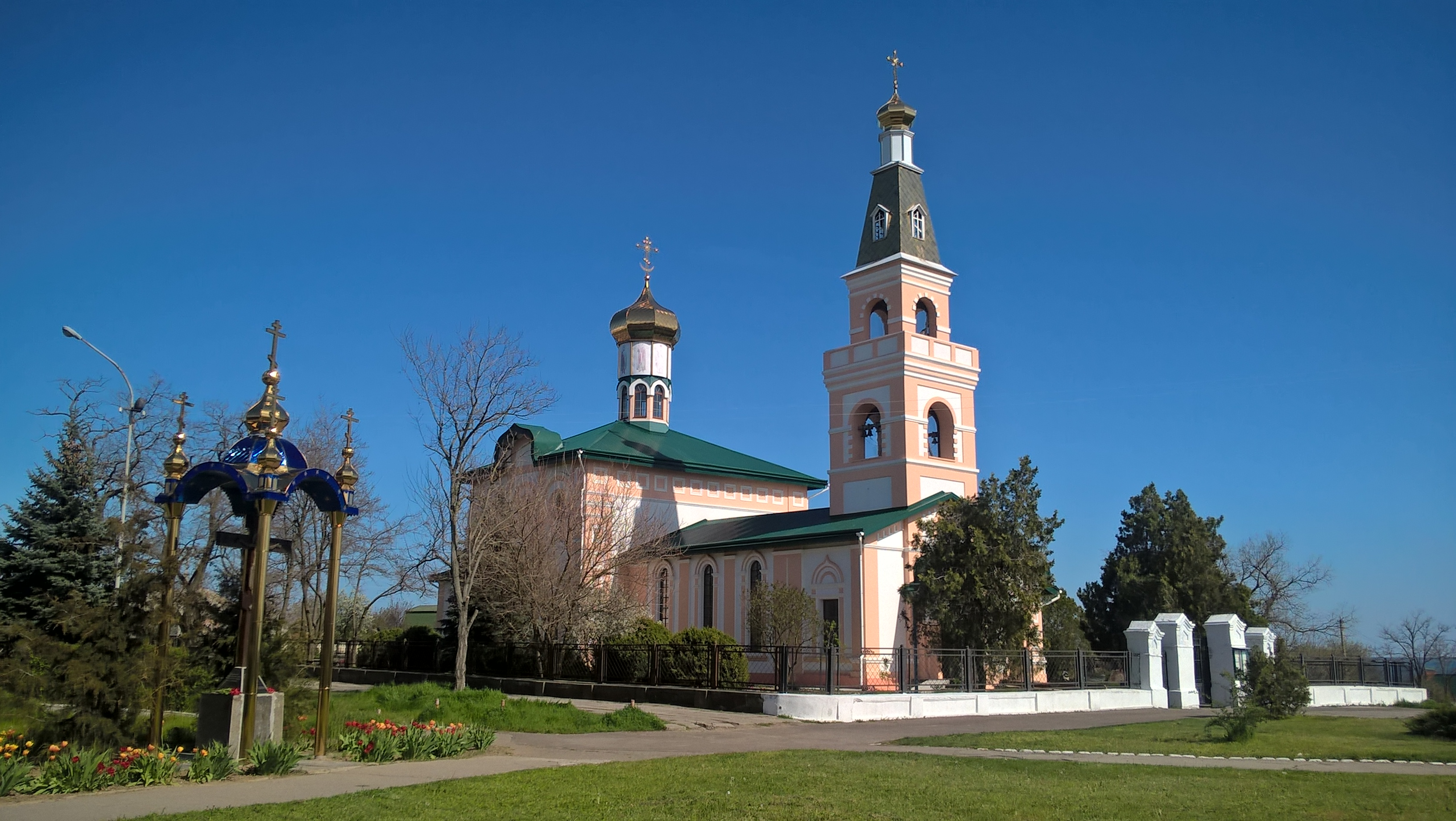
Saint Nicholas Church in Ochakiv

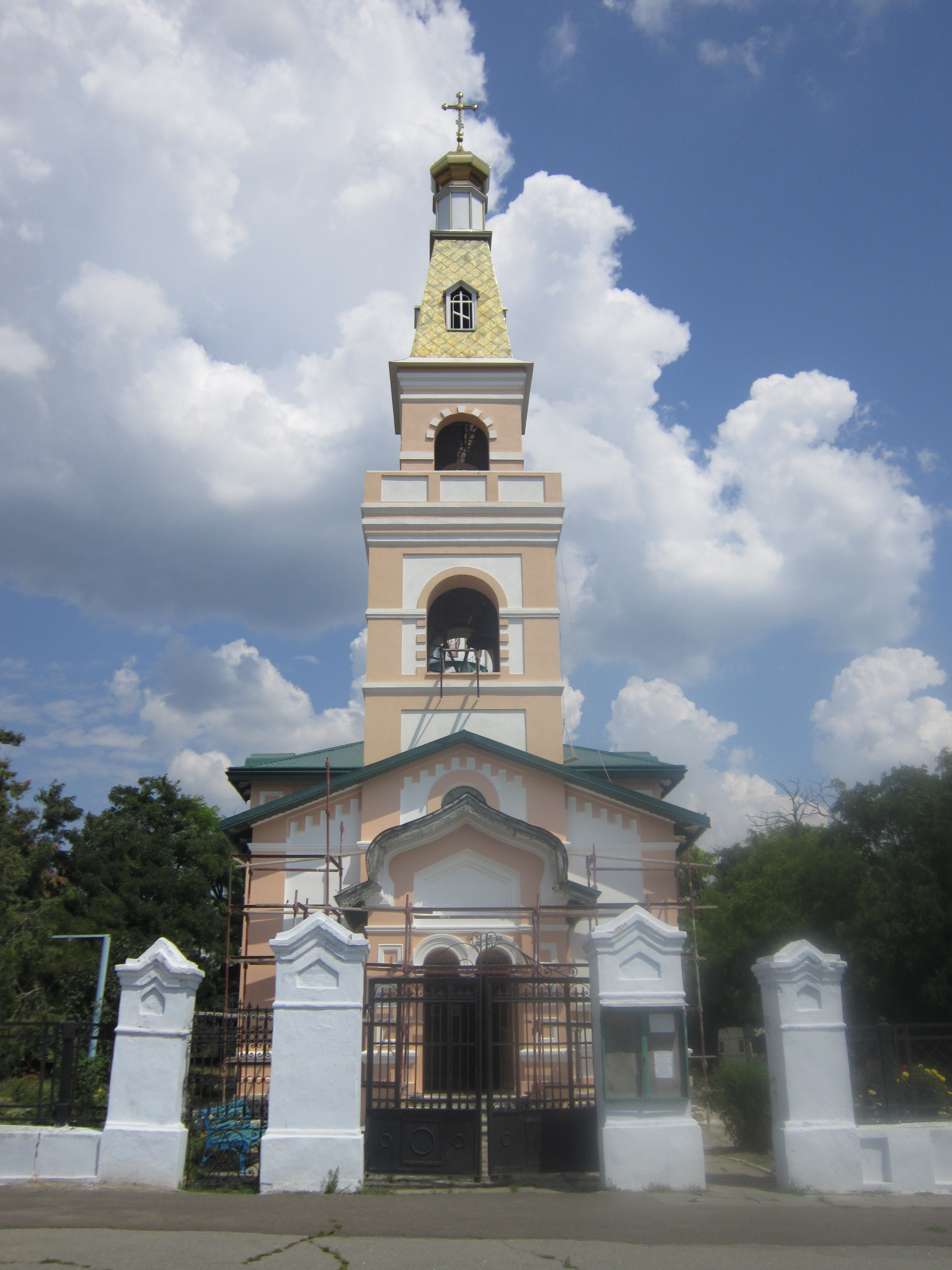
Saint Nicholas Church

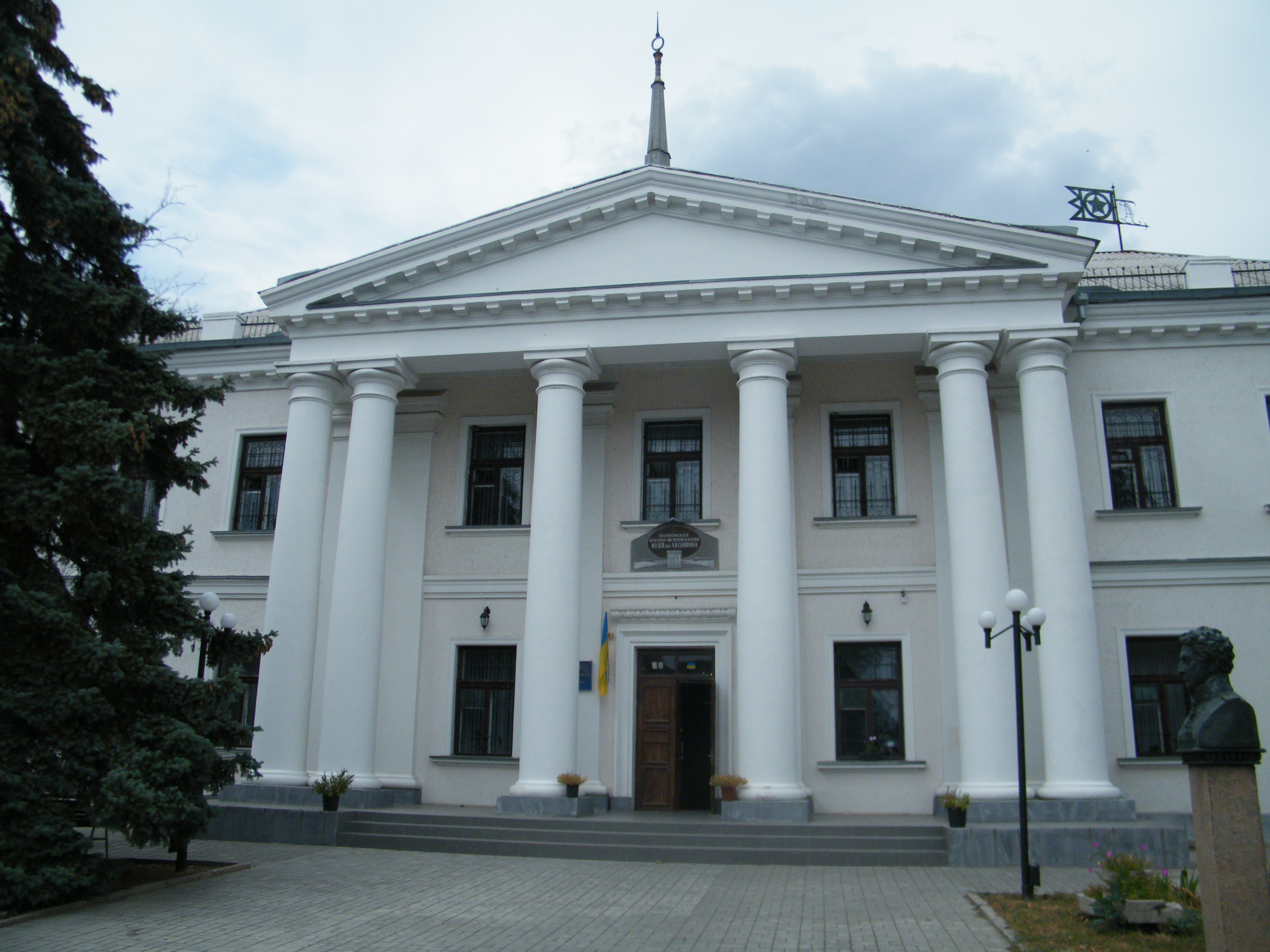
Ochakiv Military History Museum

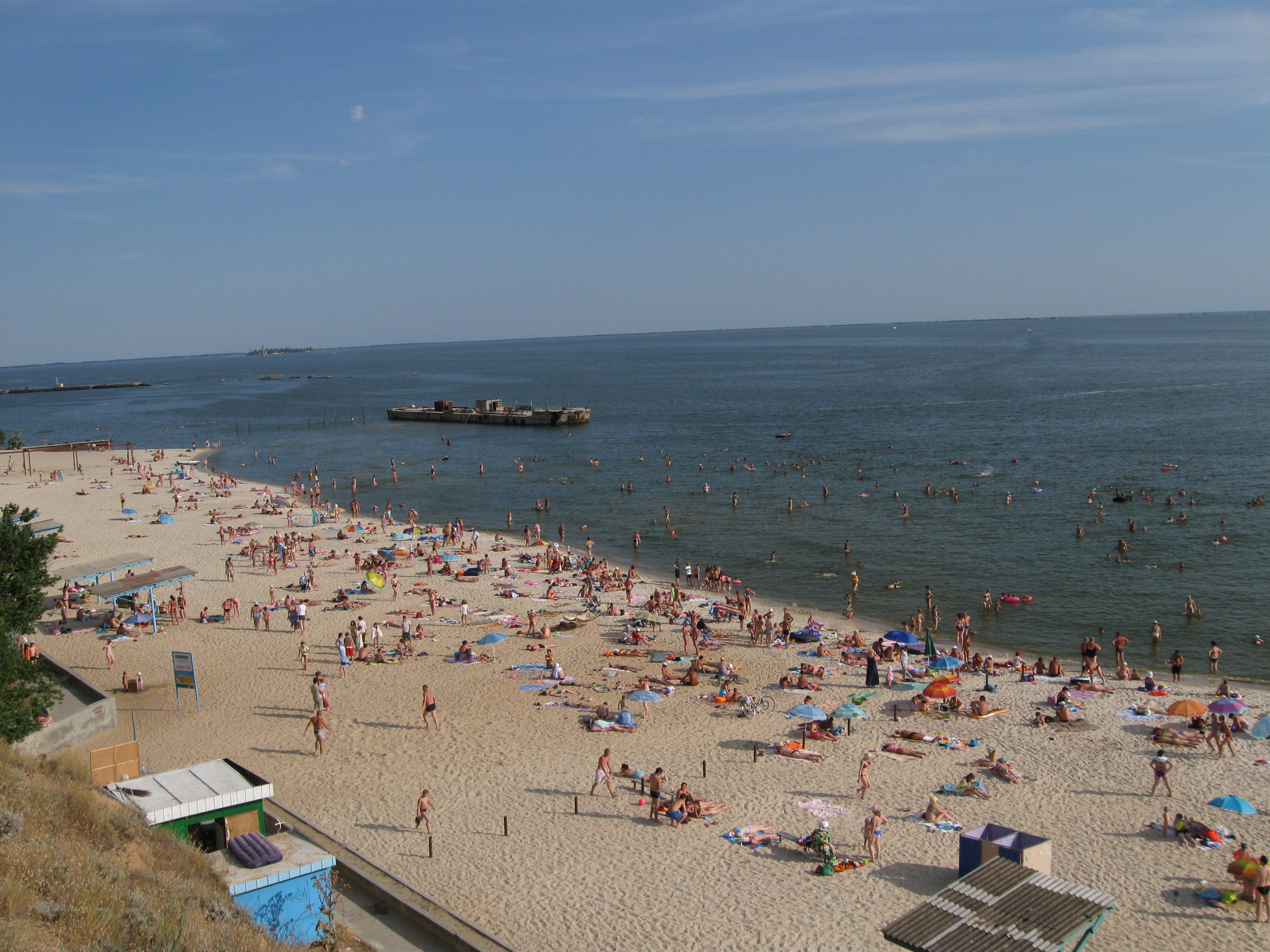
Beach near the 'Alley of fairy tales'
