= List of islands of Ukraine =

This is a list of named islands located in Ukraine.

== Islands ==
=== Black Sea ===
Black Sea islands of Ukraine
Island	Ukrainian name (Note: Links to Ukrainian Wikipedia articles for each island.)	Location	Area (Note: Islands without a recorded area are marked with a dash (—).)	Highest elevation (Note: Islands without a recorded peak elevation are marked with a dash (—).)	Coordinates
Adalary Rocks	Адалари	Near Gurzuf, southern Crimea	0.0107 km^{2} (0.0041 sq mi) (Note: Total, collective area of the individual rocks.)	48 m (157 ft)	44°32′32″N 34°17′46″E
Berezan Island	Березань	At the opening of the Dnipro–Buh estuary	0.24 km^{2} (0.093 sq mi)	20 m (66 ft)	46°36′00″N 31°24′06″E
Snake Island	Зміїний	Near the Danube Delta	0.17 km^{2} (0.066 sq mi)	41 m (135 ft)	45°15′00″N 30°12′00″E
Dzharylhach	Джарилгач	In Kherson Oblast-portion of Karkinit Bay	56 km^{2} (22 sq mi)	2 m (6.6 ft)	46°01′00″N 32°54′00″E
Dovhyi Island (Note: Due to its small size and close proximity, the neighboring Kruhlyi Island (located at 46°25′37.42″N 31°43′27.01″E) is typically grouped with Dovhyi Island.)	Довгий	Separates Yahorlyk Bay from the Black Sea	6 km^{2} (2.3 sq mi)	3 m (9.8 ft)	46°23′51″N 31°45′06″E
Ship Rocks	Скелі-кораблі	South of Opuk Cape, Kerch Peninsula	—	20 m (66 ft)	45°00′27″N 36°10′28″E
St. George's Rock	Скеля святого явлення (Note: Translates to "Rock of the Holy Apparition". The name St. George's Rock in Ukrainian is Скеля Святого Георгія (Skelia Sviatoho Heorhiia).)	On the edge of Cape Fiolent and south of the Balaklava District of Sevastopol	0.00132 km^{2} (0.00051 sq mi)	26 m (85 ft)	44°30′06″N 33°30′31″E
Swan Islands	Лебедині острови	On the northwest coast of Crimea, in Karkinit Bay	0.57 km^{2} (0.22 sq mi)	1.5 m (4.9 ft)	45°52′45″N 33°32′38″E
Tendra Spit (Note: Although called a spit, the Tendra Spit is separated from the mainland by a narrow strait, thus making it geographically an island. Due to this, it is also often simply referred to as Tendra.)	Тендрівська Коса	Sandbar that separates the Gulf of Tendra from the Black Sea	12.89 km^{2} (4.98 sq mi)	—	46°14′24″N 31°37′48″E
Tuzla Island	Тузла	In the Strait of Kerch	2.1 km^{2} (0.81 sq mi)	1 m (3.3 ft)	45°16′00″N 36°33′00″E
Kozachyi Island (Note: The island was known as Pervomaiskyi Island (Ukrainian: Первомайський острів) until 23 January 2025, when it was renamed to comply with derussification policies.)	Козачий	At the opening of the Dnipro–Buh estuary	0.073 km^{2} (0.028 sq mi)	8 m (26 ft)	46°34′20″N 31°33′35″E
Nova Zemlia Island (Note: Also known as K Island in Romania. The island is divided between Romania (40%) and Ukraine (60%).)	Нова Земля	Located in Musura Bay at the opening of the Danube Delta	5.6 km^{2} (2.2 sq mi) (Note: This represents the total, geographic area of the island. The area of the island in Ukraine's territory is approximately 3.36 km^{2} (1.30 sq mi).)	—	45°11′08″N 29°45′45″E

=== Rivers ===
Riverine islands in Ukraine
Island	Ukrainian name	Location	River	Area	Highest elevation	Coordinates
Liubychiv	Любичів	Located at the administrative border between Chernihiv and Kyiv Oblasts	Desna	+45 km^{2} (17 sq mi)	—	50°50′51.39″N 30°47′35.05″E
Love Island (Note: Is an artificial island.)	Острів кохання	Located in the city of Khmelnytskyi	Southern Buh	0.034 km^{2} (0.013 sq mi)	30 m (98 ft)	49°26′04″N 26°58′29″E
Kempa	Кемпа	Located in the city of Vinnytsia	Southern Buh	0.027 km^{2} (0.010 sq mi)	—	49°13′57″N 28°29′00″E
Muromets	Муромець	Split between Kyiv Oblast and the city of Kyiv	Dnipro	1.48 km^{2} (0.57 sq mi)	—	50°30′20″N 30°32′35″E
Trukhaniv Island	Труханів острів	Part of Kyiv city's Dniprovskyi District	Dnipro	4.5 km^{2} (1.7 sq mi)	—	50°27′48″N 30°32′42″E
Venetsiiskyi Island	Венеційський острів	Part of the Hydropark neighborhood in Kyiv's Dniprovskyi District	Dnipro	—	—	50°26′27″N 30°34′33″E
Dolobetskyi Island	Долобецький острів	Part of the Hydropark neighborhood in Kyiv's Dniprovskyi District	Dnipro	—	—	50°27′13″N 30°34′34″E
Rusanivka	Русанівка	Neighborhood of Kyiv's Dniprovskyi District surrounded by a canal	Dnipro	—	N/A	50°26′21″N 30°35′52″E
Vodnykiv Island	Водників острів	Part of Kyiv's Holosiivskyi District	Dnipro	—	—	50°20′48″N 30°35′33″E
Zhukiv Island	Жуків острів	Part of Kyiv's Holosiivskyi District	Dnipro	16.3 km^{2} (6.3 sq mi)	—	50°19′54″N 30°36′33″E
Monastyrskyi Island	Монастирський острів	Part of Dnipro's Sobornyi District	Dnipro	0.4 km^{2} (0.15 sq mi)	—	48°27′58″N 35°04′27″E
Khortytsia	Хортиця	Located near Zaporizhzhia, downstream from the Dnipro dam	Dnipro	23.59 km^{2} (9.11 sq mi)	30 m (98 ft)	47°49′12″N 35°06′00″E
Sahaidachnyi Island	Острів імені Сагайдачного	Part of Zaporizhzhia city in the Dnipro Reservoir	Dnipro	0.059 km^{2} (0.023 sq mi)	56 m (184 ft)	47°53′01″N 35°06′30″E
Baida (Note: Also known as Vyrva (Вирва), Little Khortytsia (Мала Хортиця, Mala Khortytsia), and Kantserivskyi (Канцерівський). Possibly the site of Khortytsia Castle, mentioned in sources about the 1550s.)	Байда	Part of Zaporizhzhia city	Dnipro	0.07 km^{2} (0.027 sq mi)	12 m (39 ft) (Note: According to some sources, the highest point on the island is 14 m (46 ft).)	47°50′06″N 35°03′02″E
Kuchuhury Islands (Note: The Kuchuhury Islands were an archipelago of 13 small islands in the northwest part of the Kakhovka Reservoir. Velyki Kuchuhury (Великі Кучугури, lit. 'Big Kuchuhury') and Mali Kuchuhury (Малі Кучугури, lit. 'Small Kuchuhury') were the largest and most prominent of the islands before the destruction of the reservoir and the consequent re-emergence of the Great Meadow.)	Великі і Малі Кучугури	In the western part of the Kakhovka Reservoir, near Vasylivka	Dnipro	4 km^{2} (1.5 sq mi)	—	47°32′44″N 35°12′15″E
Velykyi Potomkin Island (Note: Also known as Potemkin Island and historically called Maslov Island (острів Маслов). Officially since 23 January 2025 it was renamed to Velykyi Vilkhovyi Island (острів Великий Вільховий) to comply with the derussification policies.)	Великий Вільховий острів	Part of the Kherson urban hromada, located between the cities of Kherson and Hola Prystan	Dnipro	25 km^{2} (9.7 sq mi)	—	46°34′30″N 32°32′00″E
Kyslytskyi Island	Кислицький острів	Located in the Chilia branch, one of the Danube's distributary channels near the Romania–Ukraine border in Odesa Oblast that forms the northernmost area of the Danube Delta	Danube	57 km^{2} (22 sq mi)	1 m (3.3 ft)	45°23′30″N 29°05′46″E
Maican Island	Майкан	Located between the cities of Kiliia and Vylkove in Odesa Oblast	Danube	0.6 km^{2} (0.23 sq mi)	—	45°26′17″N 29°23′41″E
Malyi Tataru	Малий Татару	Located in the Chilia branch, one of the Danube's distributary channels near the Romania–Ukraine border in Odesa Oblast that forms the northernmost area of the Danube Delta	Danube	7.38 km^{2} (2.85 sq mi)	—	45°21′0.10″N 29°0′3.70″E
Malyi Daller	Малий Даллер	Located in the Chilia branch, one of the Danube's distributary channels near the Romania–Ukraine border (close to the Ukrainian village Stara Nekrasivka) in Odesa Oblast that forms the northernmost area of the Danube Delta	Danube	2.58 km^{2} (1.00 sq mi)	—	45°22′0″N 29°03′0″E
Velykyi Daller	Великий Даллер	Located in the Chilia branch, one of the Danube's distributary channels near the Romania–Ukraine border in Odesa Oblast that forms the northernmost area of the Danube Delta	Danube	3.7 km^{2} (1.4 sq mi)	2 m (6.6 ft)	45°22′55″N 29°05′20″E
Salmanovskyi	Салмановський	Located near the Romania–Ukraine border in Odesa Oblast	Danube	—	6 m (20 ft)	45°27′58″N 29°27′20″E
Yermakov	Єрмаков	Located in lower part of the Danube Delta near the Romania–Ukraine border close to the city of Vylkove in Odesa Oblast	Danube	23.34 km^{2} (9.01 sq mi)	1 m (3.3 ft)	45°26′09″N 29°30′00″E
Bilhorodskyi	Білгородський	Located in Sasyk Lagoon at the administrative border between Bilhorod-Dnistrovskyi Raion and Izmail Raion in Odesa Oblast	Danube	—	8 m (26 ft)	45°44′0″N 29°40′0″E
Pivdennyi Island	Південний острів	Located in the Chilia branch, one of the Danube's distributary channels near the Romania–Ukraine border in Odesa Oblast that forms the northernmost area of the Danube Delta	Danube	—	—	45°26′17″N 29°23′41″E
Shabash	Шабаш	Located in the Chilia branch, one of the Danube's distributary channels that forms the northernmost area of the Danube Delta, and separated from the neighboring Prorvin Island by the Prorva Channel in Odesa Oblast	Danube	—	16 m (52 ft)	45°27′54″N 29°43′14″E
Prorvin	Прорвін	Located in the Chilia branch, one of the Danube's distributary channels that forms the northernmost area of the Danube Delta, and separated from the neighboring Shabash Island by the Prorva Channel in Odesa Oblast	Danube	7.99 km^{2} (3.08 sq mi)	1 m (3.3 ft)	45°27′50″N 29°44′00″E
Ochakiv Island	Очаківський острів	Located in the Danube Delta near the Romania–Ukraine border in Odesa Oblast	Danube	—	—	45°24′35″N 29°40′06″E
Ankudinov	Анкудінов	Located in the Danube Delta near the Romania–Ukraine border in Odesa Oblast	Danube	16.5 km^{2} (6.4 sq mi)	—	45°23′00″N 29°40′00″E
Pishchanyi	Піщаний острів	Located in the Danube Delta near the Romania–Ukraine border in Odesa Oblast	Danube	—	—	45°22′17″N 29°41′24″E
Stambulskyi (Note: Also known as Istanbul Island.)	Стамбульський	Located in the Danube Delta near the Romania–Ukraine border in Odesa Oblast	Danube	—	—	45°21′27″N 29°39′30″E
Kubanu	Кубану	Located in the Chilia branch, one of the Danube's distributary channels near the Romania–Ukraine border in Odesa Oblast that forms the northernmost area of the Danube Delta	Danube	48 km^{2} (19 sq mi)	1 m (3.3 ft)	45°16′37″N 29°42′45″E

== See also ==
- Geography of Ukraine
- List of spits of Ukraine
