= List of spits of Ukraine =

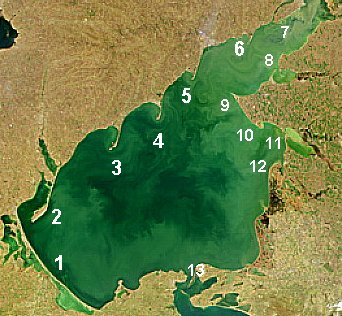
Satellite image of the Azov Sea with major spits labeled. Spits of Ukraine, in order, 1. Arabat, 2. Byriuchyi/Fedotova, (Note: Byriuchyi Island is the larger portion of the feature shown while Fedotova Spit is the very narrow part that connects Byriuchyi to the mainland. Depending on weather and sea conditions, Byriuchyi alternates between being a geographic spit extending from Fedotova Spit's land and an island separated from Fedotova Spit by a narrow strait.) 3. Obytichna, 4. Berdiansk, 5. Bilosaraiska, and 6. Kryva. The Komysh-Burunska Spit, although present in the image (near Russia's Chushka Spit numbered 13), is too small to see and is not marked itself. Ukraine's other spits are either not labeled or not shown.

Spits (Ukrainian: Коси, romanized: Kosy), (Note: Коси is the plural Ukrainian word for spit. The singular word for spit is Коса (Kosa).) also called sandspits, are long, narrow coastal landforms that resemble sandbars or embankments and protrude into a body of water from a headland. Spits are formed by the process of longshore drift, in which waves impact the headland at a sharp angle, depositing sediment and causing the water's currents to transport the sediment down the beach, allowing it to accumulate in the area of the spit. Through the process of wave shoaling, this accumulated sediment becomes increasingly curved, resembling the appearance of a fish hook as the waves refract around the spit's end. Often lagoons, estuaries, and salt marshes will form near spits.

Numerous spits are located across the territory of Ukraine, particularly on the Sea of Azov and Black Sea's coasts as well as on the shores of major rivers. Due to natural and artificial changes, a number of islands in the country have become geographic spits as the straits separating them from the mainland have been filled, such as following the start of the full-scale Russian invasion of Ukraine when Russian troops connected the then-largest island in Ukraine, Dzharylhach, to the mainland. (Note: Russian troops filled in with sand the strait separating Dzharylhach from the mainland in May 2023, making it a geographic spit. Before the strait was filled, Dzharylhach had been the largest island by area in Ukraine.) There are also some geographic features that alternate in their classification as an island or as a spit based on variable weather and sea conditions, most notably Byriuchyi Island, which typically becomes an island in the autumn months when its narrow isthmus connection to the mainland is flooded by higher tides. In addition, there are several landforms commonly referred to as spits which have different geographical definitions, such as Tendra Spit in western Kherson Oblast, which is separated from the mainland by a strait, making it an island; (Note: Other geographical islands with this misnomer, based on name and feature type listed in official Ukrainian government registers, are Potapivska Kosa (Ukrainian: Потапівська Коса) in Odesa Oblast; Monaska Kosa (Монаська Коса) in Kyiv Oblast; Dyka Kosa (Дика Коса) in Dnipropetrovsk Oblast; and Somova Kosa (Сомова Коса), Martynivska Kosa (Мартинівська Коса), and Hadiucha Kosa (Гадюча Коса) in Kherson Oblast.) and Katranska Spit in southern Odesa Oblast, which is fully connected from both ends to the mainland, making it an isthmus. Some spits, such as Berdiansk Spit, have geographical spits that extend out from its main area, although these smaller features are generally considered as part of the larger spit's land. There are also spits that extend from islands, such as Bili Kuchuhury, which branches off from Tendra Spit.

Through history, Ukraine's geography has undergone significant changes, with there being numerous spits that have emerged and disappeared through natural and artificial processes. In classical antiquity, Tendra Spit and Dzharylhach both connected to the mainland coast to form a single, continuous spit called the Course of Achilles. (Note: Also called Dromos Achilles (Achilles' Drome).) Based on the combined current land areas of Tendra Spit and Dzharylhach as well as historical records, the Course of Achilles would have had a total area of between approximately 68.94 km^{2} (26.62 sq mi) (Note: The approximate minimum area of 68.89 km^{2} is calculated by the addition of the modern-day areas of Tendra Spit (12.89 km^{2}) and Dzharylhach (56.05 km^{2}).) and 315.4 km^{2} (121.8 sq mi), (Note: According to Strabo's Geographica, between the 1st century BC and early 1st century AD, the Course of Achilles had a length of 1,000 stadia and a width between four plethra (an ancient Greek unit smaller than stadia) and two stadia, which would have equated to an absolute maximum calculated area of approximately 315.4 km^{2} (121.8 sq mi).) making it one of the largest spits in Ukraine at that time. Another former, though smaller, spit was Seribna Spit, which was historically located at the confluence of the Samara and Dnipro rivers; (Note: Seribna Spit was recorded by Ukrainian academic Dmytro Yavornytsky as being downstream from the small islands of Shevsky (Ukrainian: Шевський) and Hryniv (Гринів) on the left bank of the Dnipro and opposite from the large Stanovy Island (Становий острів, Stanovyi ostriv) located on the river's right bank. Due to the flooding of these islands together with the spit by the creation of the Dnipro Reservoir, the precise location of the spit is uncertain.) it became almost entirely submerged by the Dnipro Reservoir after the Dnipro dam's initial construction in 1932. Currently, there are 45 (Note: Dzharylhach is recorded as an island (Ukrainian: острів, romanized: ostriv) in the Register and is thus not included in this count.) named geographical features recognized as spits in the State Register of Geographical Names—the country's official geoportal maintained by the State Service of Ukraine for Geodesy, Cartography and Cadastre. Of these, the largest spit in the country and the longest spit in the world is the Arabat Spit, which separates the western parts of the Sea of Azov from the Syvash—a large area of salty, shallow lagoons in Crimea. During the Russo-Ukrainian war, many of Ukraine's spits that came under Russian control as well as those near and far from the frontline have experienced significant damage or artificial alterations due to the fighting and detrimental policies of Russian military and occupation officials.

== Political status ==
Following the Russian occupation and annexation of Crimea in 2014, the Autonomous Republic of Crimea-portion of the Arabat Spit, as well as additional smaller spits located on the Crimean peninsula, came under the control of Russian forces, who de facto administered the territory as part of the unrecognized Russian Republic of Crimea. Parts of the small, northern segment of the spit administratively located in Kherson Oblast, including the village of Strilkove, were also briefly occupied by unmarked Russian soldiers beginning from 15 March before their withdrawal on 9 December 2014. After the Donbas war, the Kryva Spit located in Donetsk Oblast was also occupied in 2014, with pro-Russian militants taking the spit's area and neighboring settlement of Siedove.

From the withdrawal of the Russian troops in December until the full-scale Russian invasion of Ukraine on 24 February 2022, the northern parts of the Arabat Spit were amongst the few areas geographically part of the Crimean peninsula that stayed under the control of Ukrainian authorities, while the Kryva Spit remained under the control of separatist forces as part of the Russian-backed Donetsk People's Republic. After the start of the full-scale invasion, the remaining northern segment of the Arabat Spit as well as the rest of Ukraine's Azov Sea coastline (including the five spits still under the control of Ukrainian authorities before 2022), were occupied by Russian forces. In addition, following their offensive into and occupation of Kherson Oblast, Russian troops also occupied the Kinburn and Bili Kuchuhury spits. The occupied spits were all integrated into Russia following its unilateral annexation of separatist-controlled and other Russian-occupied territories of Ukraine on 30 September 2022. Many of Ukraine's spits, including all of its Azov Sea spits, have remained under Russian de facto control since 2022 while the United Nations and most of the international community continue to recognize the territories as de jure part of Ukraine.

== List ==
Spits of Ukraine

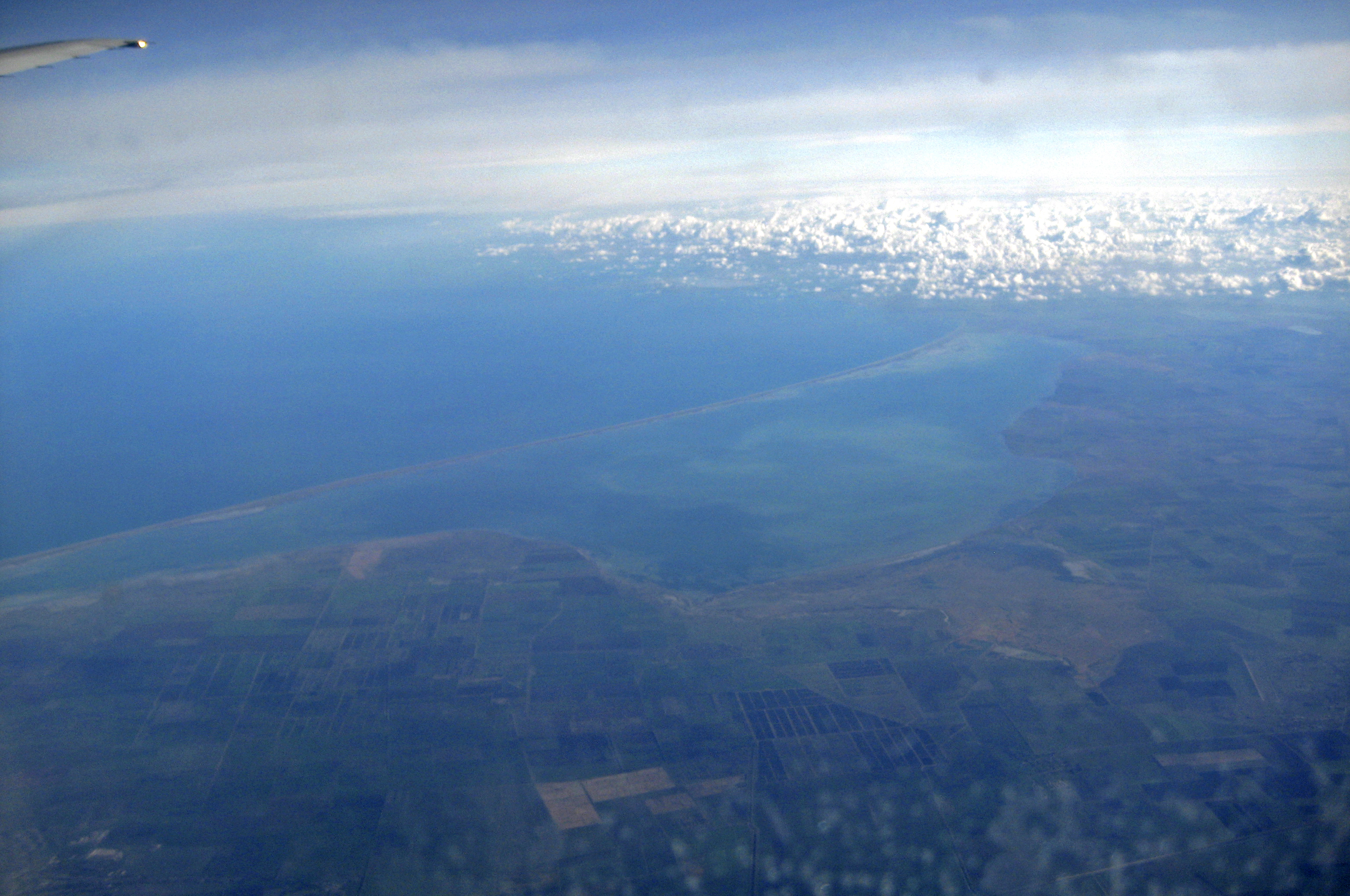
Arabat Spit, the largest spit in Ukraine and one of the largest spits in the world

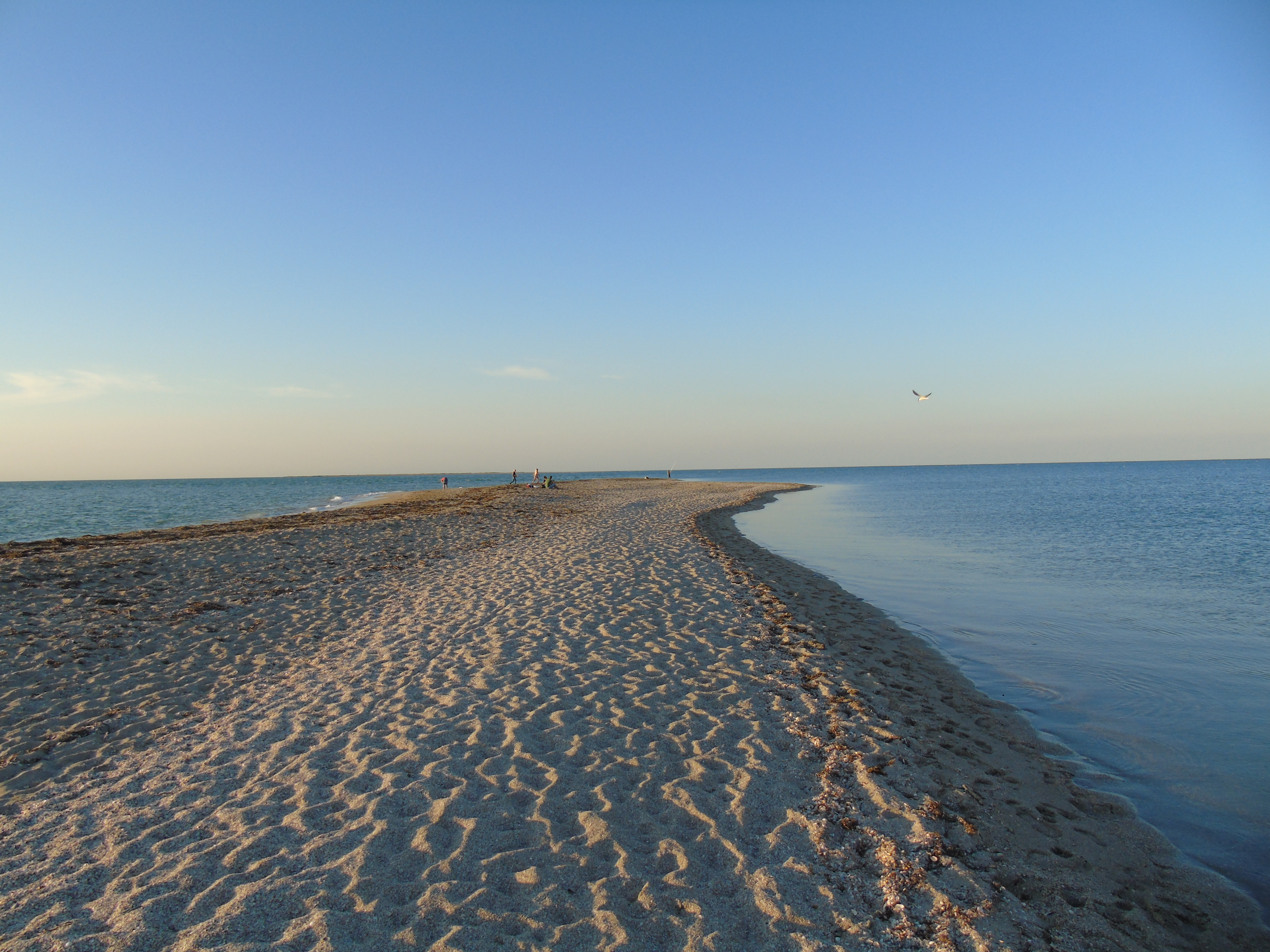
Bakalska Spit on the western coast of Crimea

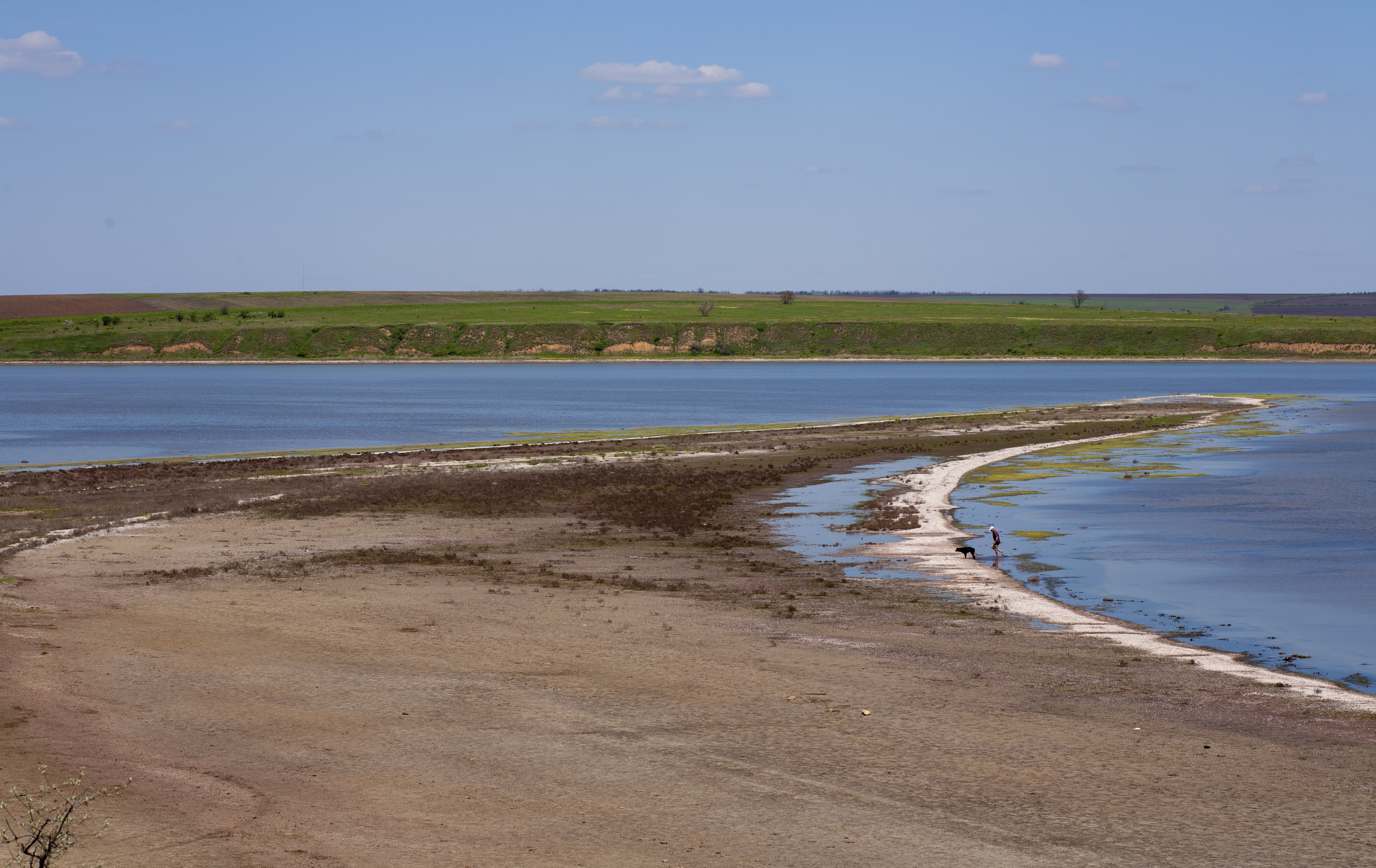
Arrow Spit on the Tylihul Estuary's western shore

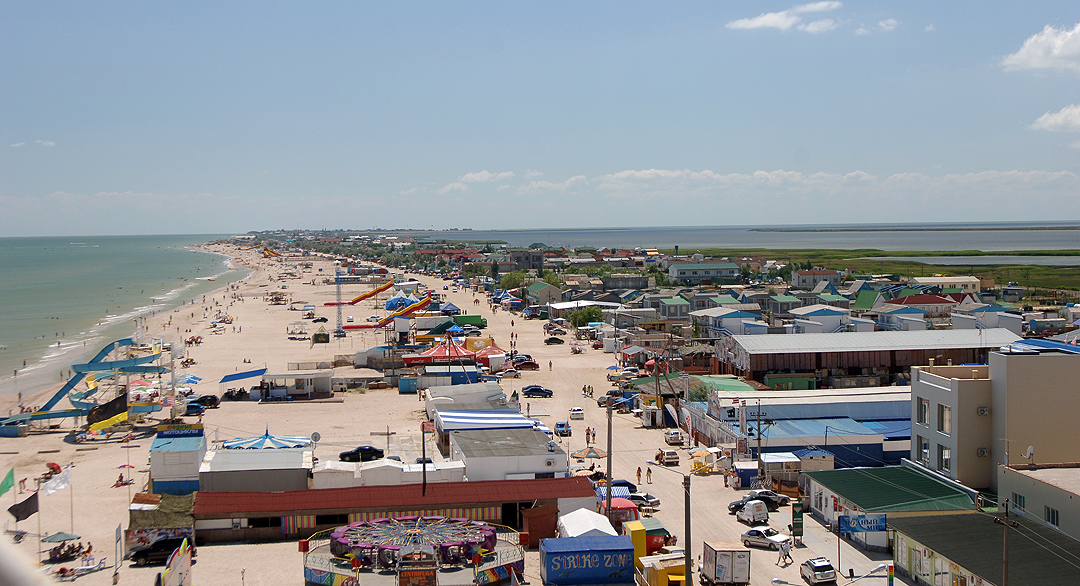
Kyrylivka's beaches on Fedotova Spit

* Geographical spit listed in the official government geoportal as an island.

Spits of Ukraine
Spit (Note: The official English name of each spit as listed in Ukraine's State Register of Geographical Names is used; additional common names and transliterations are indicated by footnotes, if applicable.)	Ukrainian name (Note: Links to the Ukrainian Wikipedia articles for each spit, if available)	Geocode (Note: In Ukraine, geographical and other objects are given registration numbers (i.e. unique identifiers) and listed in the country's official geoportal database, the State Register of Geographical Names, which is maintained by the State Service of Ukraine for Geodesy, Cartography and Cadastre. These codes are organized in the format Ф-#####, with the five hashes being placeholder text for the unique five digit numerical code of each object. The Ukrainian Cyrillic letter Ф (transliterated into English as F) is an abbreviation of фізико-географічних (transl. physical-geographical), indicating the objects' type as physical-geographical. The object registration numbers of each spit as indicated on the database is shown in the table.)	Administrative division	Geographic location	Water body	Area (Note: Spits without a recorded area are marked with a dash (—).)	Highest elevation (Note: Spits without a recorded peak elevation are marked with a dash (—).)	Coordinates	Refs.
Adzhyholska kosa	Аджигольська коса	F-13807	Mykolaiv			—	—		
Adzhyholska kosa	Аджигольська коса	F-13957	Mykolaiv, Mykolaiv Raion, Kutsurub rural hromada			—	—		
Arabat Spit	Арабатська Стрілка (Note: The name Арабатська Стрілка (Arabatska Strilka) translates to Arabat Arrow or Arrow of Arabat. Arabat Spit in Ukrainian is Арабатська Коса (Arabatska Kosa). It is also referred to as Arabatska Spit.)	F-13370	Crimea/Kherson (Note: Mostly located in the Autonomous Republic of Crimea, with a smaller portion in Kherson Oblast.)	Separates the Syvash lagoons from the Sea of Azov	Sea of Azov	395 km^{2} (153 sq mi)	—	45°42′00″N 35°00′00″E	
Arrow Spit	Коса Стрілка (Note: Links to the Ukrainian Wikipedia page for Arrow Spit Bird Reserve, which includes the territory of the spit as well as surrounding areas. There is currently no separate article on Wikipedia for the spit itself.)	F-45865	Odesa, Berezivka Raion (Note: The spit borders immediately next to the administrative boundary between Mykolaiv and Odesa Oblast, although it is located fully within the territory of Odesa Oblast.)	Located southeast of the nearby village Kairy on the Tylihul Estuary's western shore, near Sasyk Lagoon	Tylihul Estuary	<3.94 km^{2} (1.52 sq mi) (Note: The protected area of the Arrow Spit Bird Reserve, which includes the Arrow Spit itself and surrounding wetlands, is 3.94 square kilometres (1.52 sq mi). The area of the reserve that is geographically part of the spit is not indicated.)	—	46°55′51″N 31°00′04″E	
Bakalska Spit	Бакальська коса	F-13195	Crimea	In the northwestern Crimean peninsula, extending from the village Sterehushche and north of Bakkal Cove	Black Sea	<3 km^{2} (1.2 sq mi) (Note: In 2012, an official information board at the visitor center of the Bakalska Spit Regional Landscape Park listed the spit's area as 3 km^{2} (1.2 sq mi). After strong storms had passed through the area in 2005 and 2007, part of the spit's northern end was separated by the sea and transformed into an island. In April 2008, the Ministry of Environmental Protection and Natural Resources issued a permit for limited commercial sand mining from the Bakalska sand bank deposit, located 7 km (4.3 mi) outside the borders of the landscape park. Following local concerns of potential damage to the spit caused by the nearby operations as well as illegal sand mining on the spit itself, particularly in 2012, new laws were drafted in the Ukrainian parliament in 2013 to suspend the permit, add additional protections to the spit, and expand the boundaries of the park. After the Russian occupation of Crimea in 2014, the proposed law was disregarded by Russian occupation officials who licensed continued sand mining both outside and within the park. Due to the extensive commercial sand extraction since then, the spit's area has increasingly shrunken, with approximately 0.145 to 0.15 km^{2} (0.056–0.058 sq mi) of the spit becoming submerged in 2015, and approximately 0.33 km^{2} (0.13 sq mi) of the spit's area being reported as damaged or eroded by 2019. Because of the spit's deterioration, the present day area of the spit is significantly less than the area posted in 2012.)	1.3 m (4.3 ft)	45°46′00″N 33°11′00″E	
Berdiansk Spit (Note: Also referred to as Berdianska Spit.)	Бердянська коса	F-13741	Zaporizhzhia	South of the city of Berdiansk	Sea of Azov	7 km^{2} (2.7 sq mi)	2 m (6.6 ft)	46°39′00″N 36°47′00″E	
Bili Kuchuhury (Note: Also referred to as White Kuchuhury.)	Білі Кучугури	F-13596	Kherson	Extends from the far western half of the Tendra Spit towards the mainland Yahorlyk Kut peninsula through the Gulf of Tendra's waters	Black Sea	—	0.6 m (2.0 ft)	46°14′46″N 31°40′04″E	
Bilosaraiska Spit	Білосарайська коса	F-13795	Donetsk	In the northeast of the Azov Sea, extending from the spit's namesake village of Bilosaraiska Spit	Sea of Azov	44.45 km^{2} (17.16 sq mi)	1.8 m (5.9 ft)	46°53′30″N 37°19′50″E	
Byriuchyi Island (Note: Also referred to as Byriuchyi Island Spit (Ukrainian: Коса Бирючий Острів, romanized: Kosa Byriuchyi Ostriv) or simply Byriuchyi (Бирючий). Depending on weather and sea conditions, Byriuchyi alternates between being a geographic spit extending from Fedotova Spit and an island separated from Fedotova Spit by a narrow strait, with Byriuchyi becoming an island primarily during the autumn months when frequent storms on the Azov Sea flood the isthmus connecting Byriuchyi to Fedotova Spit.)	Бирючий Острів	F-13521	Kherson	In the northwest of the Azov Sea, extending from Fedotova Spit	Sea of Azov	27.92 km^{2} (10.78 sq mi)	—	46°07′36″N 35°06′12″E	
Chylova	Чилова	F-45835	Mykolaiv, Mykolaiv Raion			—	—		
Durylova	Дурилова	F-13578	Kherson			—	—		
Dzharylhach* (Note: Also transliterated as Dzharylgach.)	Джарилгач	F-13570	Kherson	Extends from the rural settlement of Lazurne towards the Isthmus of Perekop through Karkinit Bay	Black Sea	>56.05 km^{2} (21.64 sq mi) (Note: Prior to May 2023, Dzharylhach was the largest island in Ukraine with an area of 56.05 km^{2} (21.64 sq mi). Dzharylhach's area following its 2023 connection to the mainland by Russian troops is not indicated but is likely somewhat larger due to the addition of land reclaimed from the strait that had formerly separated it from the mainland.)	10 m (33 ft)	46°01′48″N 32°46′48″E	
Fedotova Spit	Федотова коса	F-13522	Kherson/Zaporizhzhia (Note: Mostly located in Zaporizhzhia Oblast, with a smaller portion in Kherson Oblast.)	In the northwest of the Azov Sea, extending from Kyrylivka	Sea of Azov	—	3.6 m (12 ft)	46°17′52″N 35°18′13″E	
Hlyboka kosa	Глибока коса	F-13581	Kherson			—	—		
Komysh-Burunska Spit (Note: Also known as Arshyntsevska Spit (Ukrainian: Аршинцівська коса, romanized: Arshyntsivska kosa).)	Комиш-Бурунська коса	F-13126	Crimea	In the southern part of the city of Kerch	Black Sea (Note: Located in the Kerch Strait near the entrance to the Azov Sea but still within the Black Sea's waters.)	—	1 m (3.3 ft)	45°16′05″N 36°26′06″E	
Kamysheva kosa	Камишева коса	F-13802	Mykolaiv			—	—		
Karolina-Buhaz	Кароліна-Бугаз	F-33993	Odesa, Bilhorod-Dnistrovskyi Raion			—	—		
Kosa Kryva	Коса Крива	F-13759	Zaporizhzhia			—	—		
Kinburn Spit (Note: Also referred to as Kinburnska Spit.)	Кінбурнська коса	F-13812	Mykolaiv/Kherson	Westernmost end of the Kinburn Peninsula, close to the Dnipro–Buh estuary	Black Sea	180 km^{2} (69 sq mi)	19 m (62 ft)	46°33′30″N 31°31′40″E	
Kryva Spit	Крива коса	F-13790	Donetsk	In the northeast of the Azov Sea, extending from Siedove	Sea of Azov	0.05 km^{2} (0.019 sq mi)	1.6 m (5.2 ft)	47°03′00″N 38°07′58″E	
Kryva	Крива	F-45864	Mykolaiv, Mykolaiv City Council			—	—		
Laherna kosa	Лагерна коса	F-13800	Mykolaiv			—	—		
Lantseva Kosa	Ланцева Коса	F-13799	Mykolaiv			—	—		
Levkina	Левкіна	F-13577	Kherson			—	—		
Liskova	Ліскова	F-45834	Mykolaiv, Mykolaiv City Council			—	—		
Mala Kosa	Мала коса	F-13527	Kherson			—	—		
Malenka kosa	Маленька коса	F-13631	Odesa			—	—		
Medvezha	Медвежа	F-13583	Kherson			—	—		
Milka kosa	Мілка коса	F-13580	Kherson			—	—		
Ovecha	Овеча	F-13587	Kharkiv			—	—		
Obytichna Spit (Note: Also known by its Russian transliteration Obytochna Spit.)	Обитічна коса	F-13750	Zaporizhzhia	In the northern Azov Sea, separating Obytichna Bay from Berdiansk Bay	Sea of Azov	—	1.8 m (5.9 ft)	46°31′56″N 36°12′18″E	
Ozharska	Ожарська	F-45861	Mykolaiv, Mykolaiv Raion			—	—		
Popova	Попова	F-13635	Odesa			—	—		
Pivdenna	Південна	F-45871	Odesa, Chornomorsk City Council			—	—		
Pivnichna	Північна	F-45868	Odesa, Ovidiopol Raion			—	—		
Ruska Spit	Руська коса	F-45862	Mykolaiv, Mykolaiv Raion	Located on the left bank of the Buh estuary northwest of Lymany and across from Voloska Spit	Southern Buh river	—	—	46°44′48″N 31°56′25″E	
Serednia Kosa	Середня Коса	F-13748	Zaporizhzhia			—	—		
Shahanska kosa	Шаганська коса	F-13637	Odesa			—	—		
Spaska Spit (Note: Formerly known as Zhaburna Spit (Ukrainian: Жабурна коса, romanized: Zhaburna kosa) until 1890.)	Спаська коса	F-45833	Mykolaiv, Mykolaiv City Council	Located in the Lisky neighborhood of Mykolaiv, on the city's left bank shore of the Buh estuary	Southern Buh river	—	—	46°57′33″N 31°56′14″E	
Svyniacha	Свиняча	F-13585	Kherson			—	—		
Synia kosa	Синя коса	F-13543	Kherson			—	—		
Tuzla (Note: The geographic status of Tuzla is ambiguous. Tuzla is classified in the official Ukrainian geoportal register as a spit but lacks a natural connection to the mainland. Historically, the land that currently comprises Tuzla was a large spit called Tuzla Spit (Ukrainian: Коса Тузла, romanized: Kosa Tuzla). In 1925, a storm eroded the land connection to the mainland Taman Peninsula, separating much of the spit into modern-day Tuzla Island. The strait separating the two reached over 1.0 km (0.62 mi) in width. With Russia's occupation and annexation of the Crimean peninsula in 2014, the Russian government began the construction of the Crimean Bridge to link the Taman Peninsula, located in Russian territory, with the illegally annexed city of Kerch, located in occupied Crimea. For the bridge's construction, the remains of the mainland-portion of the historic Tuzla Spit were artificially extended towards but not reaching Tuzla Island, while Tuzla Island itself was also used for the bridge. Following the completion of the bridge in 2018, Tuzla Island became connected by bridge to the mainland but remained separated by a narrow strait. Due to this complex history and the contested legality of the constructions, some sources refer to Tuzla as an island while others refer to it as a spit.)	Тузла	F-13375	Crimea			—	—		
Vasylkova kosa	Василькова коса	F-34258	Kherson			—	—		
Voloska Spit	Волоська коса	F-45863	Mykolaiv, Mykolaiv Raion	Located on the right bank of the Buh estuary near Prybuzke and across from Ruska Spit	Southern Buh river	—	—	46°43′39″N 31°55′03″E	
Yehypetska Arrow	Єгипетська Стрілка	F-34260	Kherson			—	—		
Zhebriianska Spit (Note: Also transliterated as Zhebriyanska Spit.)	Жебріянська коса	F-33848	Odesa, Izmail Raion	In the northwestern part of Zhebriian Bay, to the southeast of the village of Prymorske in the Danube Delta	Black Sea	1.6 km^{2} (0.62 sq mi)	4 m (13 ft)		

== See also ==
- Geography of Ukraine
- Spits of the Sea of Azov
- List of islands of Ukraine
- Peresyp
