= Ivory Coast of Sviatoslav National Nature Park =

National park in Ukraine

- Ukrainian: Національний природний парк «Білобережжя Святослава» (Biloberezhzhia Sviatoslava NNP)
- IUCN category II (national park)
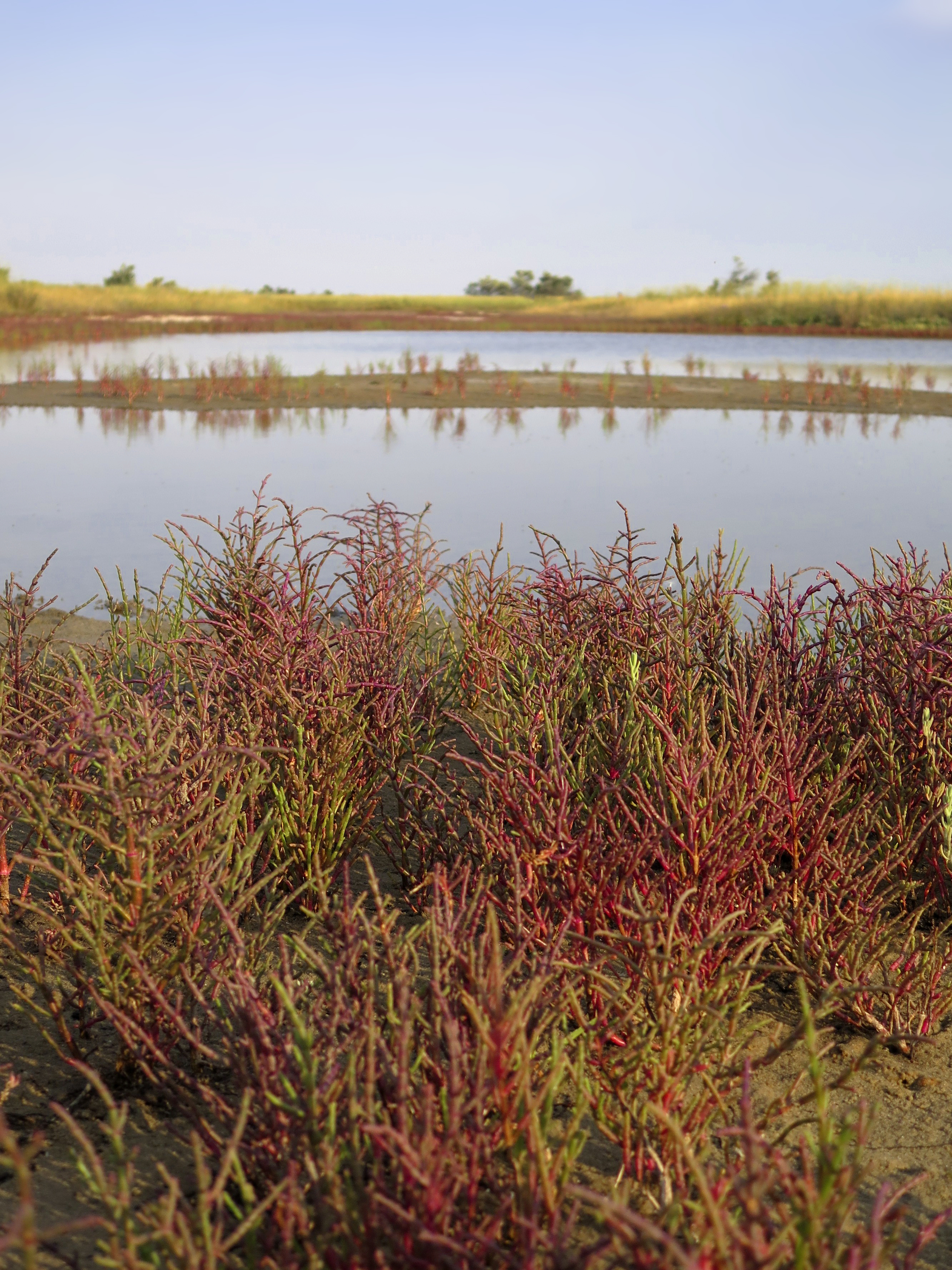
- National Nature Park Ivory Coast of Sviatoslav

- Location within Ukraine
- Location: Mykolaiv Oblast
- Nearest city: Ochakiv
- Coordinates: 46.533°N 31.5667°E
- Area: 35,223 hectares (87,038 acres; 352 km^{2}; 136 sq mi)
- Established: 2009
- Governing body: Ministry of Ecology and Natural Resources (Ukraine)
- Website: http://belosvyat.com.ua/

The Ivory Coast of Sviatoslav National Nature Park (Ukrainian: Національний природний парк «Білобережжя Святослава»), is situated on the north coast of the Black Sea in southern Ukraine. It covers portions of Dnieper–Bug estuary, the Kinburn Peninsula just south of the estuary, and Yahorlyk Bay, a shallow bay of the Black Sea itself. Adjacent to the site along the coast is the Black Sea Biosphere Reserve. The various tracts protect and display the steppe ecology of south Ukraine and the adjacent waters. The park is in Mykolaiv Raion in Mykolaiv Oblast.

== Topography ==
The park is located in the Black Sea Lowland on the farthest north of the western Black Sea, where the Dnieper River and the Southern Bug enter the sea together. The site is about 150 km west of the land bridge to the Crimean Peninsula. Along the north of the park is representative steppe and forest-steppe habitat. In the south are a patchwork of dry steppe, wetlands and adjacent salt water habitat. The estuary to the north of the Kinburn Spit is freshwater, and the bay and sea to the south are saltwater. The area is known for having many lakes – freshwater lakes fed by rain, and saltwater lakes fed by seepage from the sea.

== Climate and ecoregion ==
The official climate designation for the Kinburn Peninsula area is Humid continental climate – hot summer sub-type (Köppen climate classification Dfa), with large seasonal temperature differentials and a hot summer (at least one month averaging over 22 °C (72 °F). The park is in the Pontic–Caspian steppe ecoregion.

== Flora and fauna ==
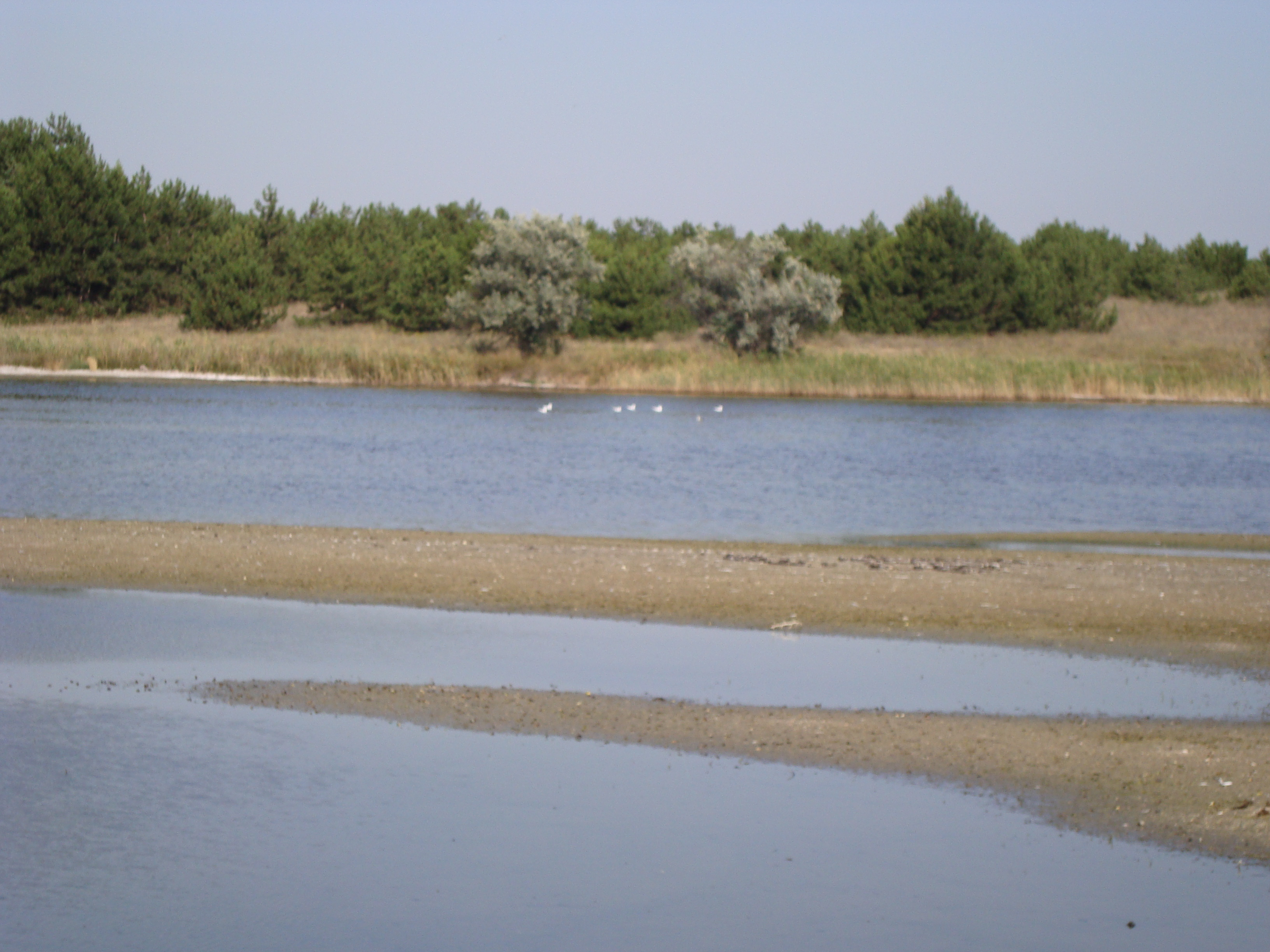
Pine stands on Kinburn Spit

The dominant vegetation on the Kinburn Spit are those of sandy steppe, with forest, meadow, hygrophylic and halophytic plant groups. Amid the grassy areas are stands of pine–oak forest, and marshes. Yahorlyk Bay to the south of the Kinburn Spit is a Ramsar wetland site.

== Public use ==
The park is relatively undeveloped; campers and hikers on the ecological routes are advised to bring their own food and water. There are water excursions available, and park ranges conduct guided tours for groups. Control of the protected areas of the park is still being improved. Illegal poaching and fishing have been problems in the past.

== See also ==
- National Parks of Ukraine
