= Tendra =

Tendra may refer to:

- Gulf (or Bay) of Tendra, Black Sea
- Spit (or Island) of Tendra, scene of Russian-Turkish naval battle
- Battle of Tendra, fought on 8 and 9 September 1790 in the Black Sea
- TenDRA Compiler
