= Tătaru Mare Island =

Island in Romania

Tătaru Mare
Native name: Tătaru Mare
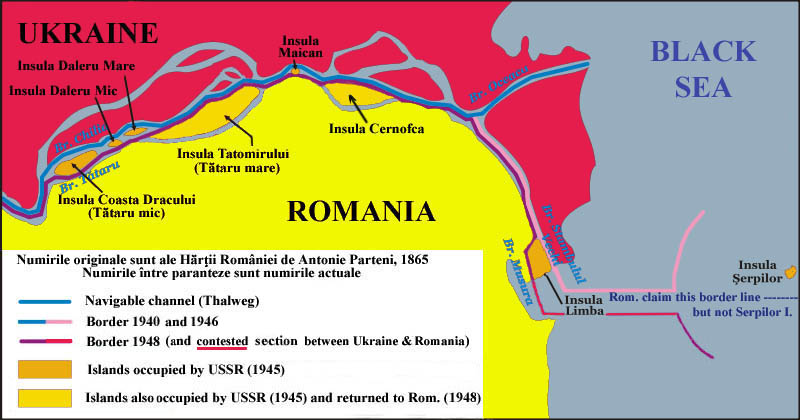
- Interactive map of Tătaru Mare

Geography
- Location: Danube, Chilia branch
- Coordinates: 45.395°N 29.205°E
- Area: 25 km^{2} (9.7 sq mi)

Administration
- Romania
- Tulcea County

Tătaru Mare Island (Romanian: Insula Tătaru Mare/Ostrovul Tătaru) is a Romanian island in the northernmost branch of the Danube Delta.

== Characteristics ==
The island has a surface area of 2,500 ha or 25 km^{2} or 9.7 sq mi and is of high importance to the local agriculture, its soil having a yearly output of up to 5 tons of wheat or 10 tons of corn per hectare. The island is home to the eponymous Ostrovu Tătaru village, within the Chilia Veche commune. Starting 2015, a Norwegian-funded minimum security prison functions on the island.

== History ==
The island was part of Romania until the start of the Second World War. In the fall of 1940, the Romanian Danube islands of Tătaru Mare, Dalerul Mic, Dalerul Mare, Maican and Limba were occupied by the Soviet Union. All of the five islands were re-occupied by Axis-aligned Romania in July 1941 (Operation München), only to be lost again in 1944 after King Michael's Coup. In early 1948, the Soviet Union agreed to return Tătaru Mare Island back to Romanian rule, the only one of the five Danube islands ultimately recovered by Romania.

== Maps ==
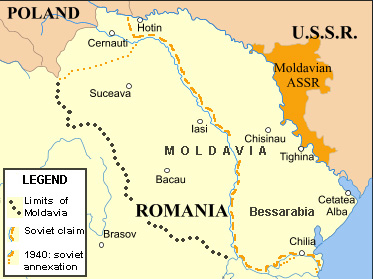
Tătaru Mare Island under Soviet occupation in 1940, marked by the dotted line just West of Chilia
