= Achillea (disambiguation) =

Achillea is a group of flowering plants.

Achillea may also refer to:

- Achillea (band), a band
- Chilia Veche, a town, formerly called Achillea
