= Spit (landform) =

Coastal bar or beach landform deposited by longshore drift

Diagram showing a spit

A spit contrasted with other coastal landforms.

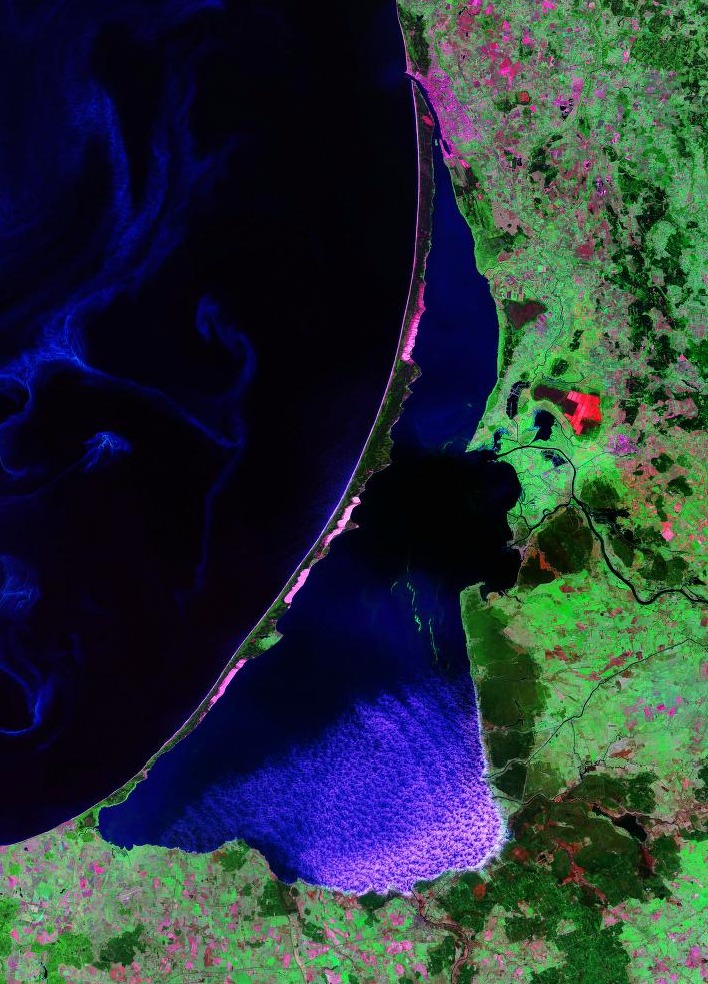
Curonian Spit, divided between Russia and Lithuania

A spit or sandspit is a deposition bar or beach landform off coasts or lake shores. It develops in places where re-entrance occurs, such as at a cove's headlands, by the process of longshore drift by longshore currents. The drift occurs because waves meet the beach at an oblique angle, moving sediment down the beach in a zigzag pattern. This is complemented by longshore currents, which further transport sediment through the water alongside the beach. These currents are caused by the same waves that cause the drift.

== Hydrology and geology ==
Where the direction of the shore inland re-enters, or changes direction, for example at a headland, the longshore current spreads out or dissipates. No longer able to carry the full load, much of the sediment is dropped. This is called deposition. This submerged bar of sediment allows longshore drift or littoral drift to continue to transport sediment in the direction the waves are breaking, forming an above-water spit. Without the complementary process of littoral drift, the bar would not build above the surface of the waves becoming a spit and would instead be leveled off underwater.

Spits occur when longshore drift reaches a section of headland where the turn is greater than 30 degrees. The spit will continue out into the sea until water pressure (e.g. from a river) becomes too great to allow the sand to deposit. Vegetation may then start to grow on the spit, and the spit may become stable and often fertile. A spit may be considered a special form of a shoal. As spits grow, the water behind them is sheltered from wind and waves, and a salt marsh is likely to develop.

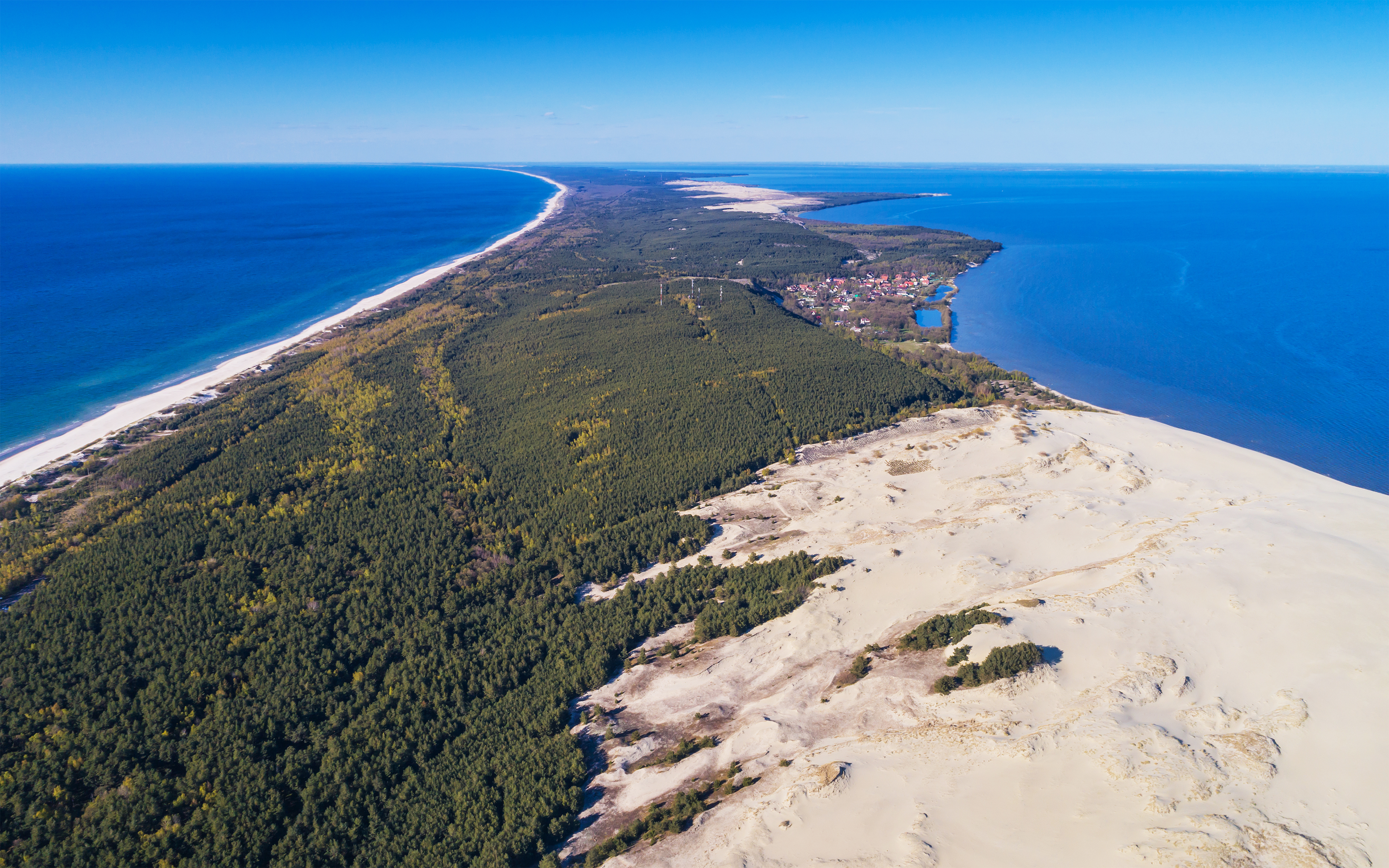
Curonian Spit, Russia

Wave refraction can occur at the end of a spit, carrying sediment around the end to form a hook or recurved spit. Refraction in multiple directions may create a complex spit. Waves that arrive in a direction other than obliquely along the spit will halt the growth of the spit, shorten it, or eventually destroy it entirely.

The sediments that make up spits come from a variety of sources including rivers and eroding bluffs, and changes there can have a major effect on spits and other coastal landforms. Activities such as logging and farming upstream can increase the sediment load of rivers, which may hurt the intertidal environments around spits by smothering delicate habitats. Roads or bulkheads built along bluffs can drastically reduce the volume of sediment eroded, so that not enough material is being pushed along to maintain the spit.

If the supply of sediment is interrupted the sand at the neck (landward end) of the spit may be moved towards the head, eventually creating an island. If the supply is not interrupted, and the spit is not breached by the sea (or, if across an estuary, the river), the spit may become a bar, with both ends joined to land, and form a lagoon behind the bar. If an island lies offshore near where the coast changes direction, and the spit continues to grow until it connects the island to the mainland, it is called a tombolo.

The end of a spit attached to land is called the proximal end, and the end jutting out into water is called the distal end.

== Notable spits around the world ==
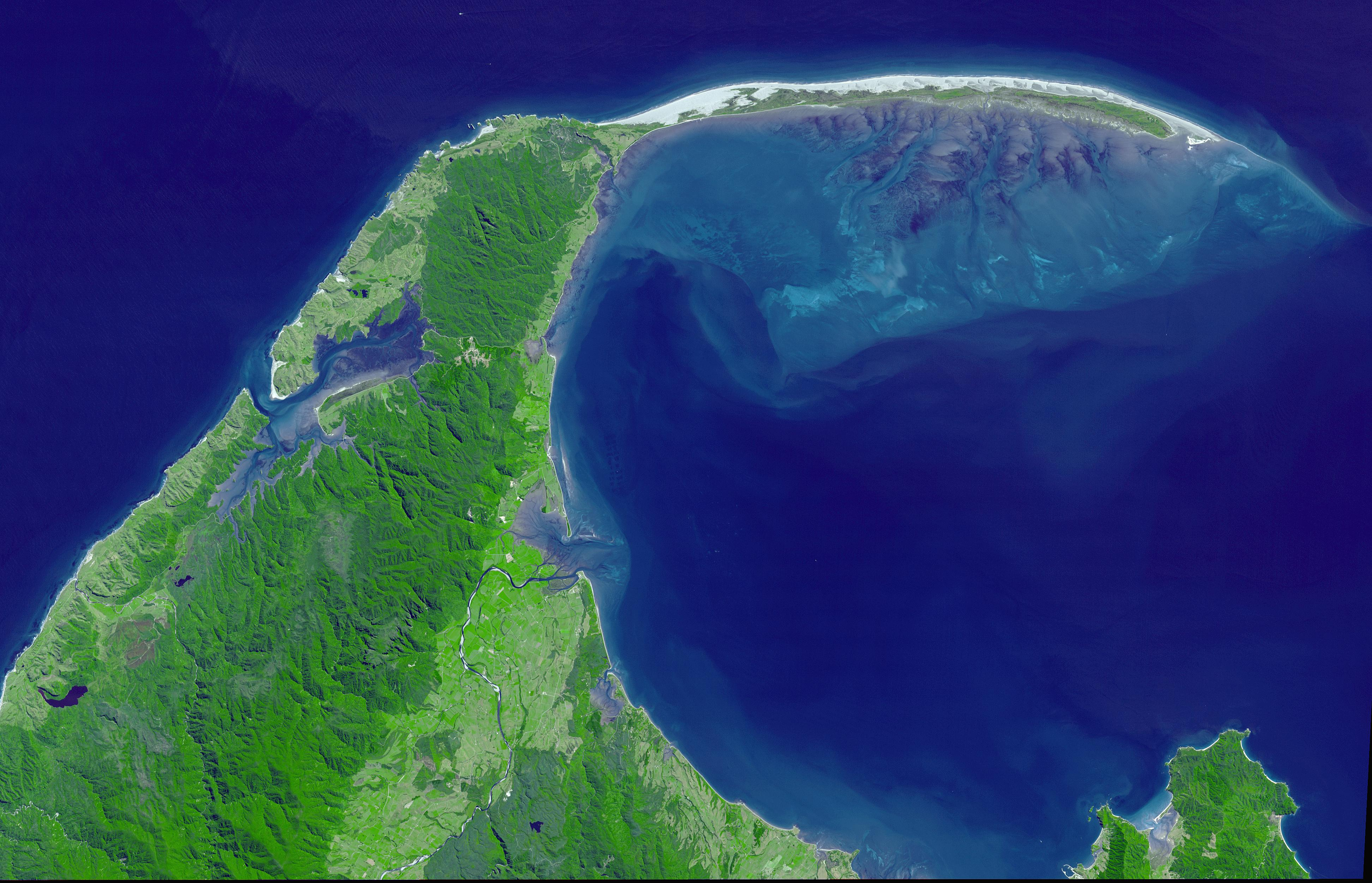
Farewell Spit, running eastwards from the northernmost point of New Zealand's South Island

There is debate as to the longest spit in the world, with both the Arabat Spit in the Sea of Azov and the Younghusband Peninsula in South Australia approximately 110 kilometres (68 mi) long.

The longest spit in a freshwater body of water is Long Point, Ontario, which extends approximately 32 km (20 mi) into Lake Erie.

Thirty-two-kilometre (20 mi) long Farewell Spit in New Zealand, in the north-west area of the South Island, is believed to be caused by the strong prevailing winds and currents, bringing sand eroded from the Southern Alps of the South Island northeastward along the west coast and depositing these into Golden Bay.

A well-known spit in the UK is Spurn Point at the Humber; it is approximately 4.8 km (3.0 mi) long. Another is Chesil Beach, which connects the Isle of Portland to the mainland.

The Curonian Spit, off the coast of Lithuania and Kaliningrad Oblast of Russia, separates the Curonian Lagoon from the Baltic Sea; it is 98 km long (61 mi). In a similar fashion, the Vistula Spit separates the Vistula Lagoon from Gdańsk Bay off the coast of Poland.

Zlatni Rat, a pebble beach jutting southward from the harbor town of Bol, on the Croatian island of Brač, is formed by Adriatic currents flowing east and west through the Hvar Channel, along the southern side of the island. The spit bends slightly west or east, changing its direction gradually, depending on the conditions of the tides and weather.

== Human settlement patterns ==
Since prehistory humans have chosen certain spit formations as sites for human habitation. In some cases, these sites have been chosen for proximity to marine resource exploitation; the Chumash Native American prehistorical settlement on the Morro Bay is one such location.

== See also ==
- Barrier island
- Isthmus
- List of geographical spits
- Ria, often confused with spit
- Shoal, a related landform
- Strait, the sea equivalent of an isthmus
- Tombolo
- List of spits of Ukraine
