= Tendra Spit =

Sandbar in Ukraine

Native name: Тендрівська коса
- Location within Kherson Oblast Location within Ukraine
- Interactive map of Tendra Spit

Geography
- Coordinates: 46°14′24″N 31°37′48″E
- Adjacent to: Black Sea, Gulf of Tendra
- Area: 12.89 km^{2} (4.98 sq mi)
- Length: 65 km (40.4 mi)
- Width: 1.8 km (1.12 mi)

Administration
- Ukraine (occupied by Russia)
- Oblast: Kherson Oblast
- Raion: Skadovsk Raion

Demographics
- Population: Uninhabited (2001)2001 Ukrainian Census

The Tendra Spit (Ukrainian: Тендрівська коса, romanized: Tendrivs'ka kosa), or Island of Tendra, is a sandbar in the Black Sea and part of Kherson Oblast in Ukraine.

The island separates the Gulf of Tendra from the Black Sea and is located at the southern and western part of the bay. In the west the island has a spit called Bili Kuchuhury which stretches east through the Gulf of Tendra as a shoal towards the Yahorlyk Kut peninsula. Bili Kuchuhury contains the Bili Kuchuhury Lighthouse.

The Tendra Lighthouse is also on the island.

== History ==
In classical antiquity, Tendra Spit and Dzharylhach both connected to the mainland coast to form a single, continuous spit called the Course of Achilles (also called Dromus Achilles).

The Battle of Tendra took place from 8 to 9 September 1790.

The mutiny of men on board the Russian battleship Potemkin took place off Tendra Spit in June 1905.

=== Russo-Ukrainian War ===
During the Russian invasion of Ukraine, on the night of 28 February 2024, Ukrainian Special Operations Forces troops from 73rd Maritime Special Operations Center attempted to make a landing on the sandbar. They were ambushed by the Russian troops and sustained heavy casualties. According to the Russian MOD, 4 boats out of 5 were destroyed or sunk and up to 25 Ukrainian soldiers were killed. One Ukrainian soldier was captured.

On 7 August 2024, Ukraine announced that it had conducted another raid on the Tendra Spit, destroying a Russian electronic warfare system, armoured vehicles and inflicting casualties on Russian personnel.

== Archaeology ==
Numerous expeditions have been focusing on human activity. The first naval expedition in 1824 under Captain Nikolaj Kritski unearthed 800 ancient coins, along with graffiti dedicated to Achilles, which confirmed the Cult of Achilles was active on the spit and that there was a sanctuary located previously on the spit. A later expedition during Soviet times found glazed pottery and amphorae from the Roman period, and later some artifacts from the late Middle Ages. A 2017 expedition focusing on the northern tip of Tendra Spit using sonar and visual surveys found fragments of amphorae from the 1st or 2nd century AD and some from the 1st century BC, tiles, and a bronze/copper plaque dated to the 1st century CE, which most likely came from an outer ship's plaiting during a shipwreck during the Roman period.

== See also ==
- Dzharylhach
- List of spits of Ukraine
- List of islands of Ukraine
