= Dovhyi Island =

Small sandy island in Ochakiv Raion, Mykolaiv Oblast, Ukraine

Native name: Довгий Острів
- Location within Mykolaiv Oblast

Geography
- Coordinates: 46°23′51″N 31°45′6″E
- Adjacent to: Black Sea, Yahorlyk Bay
- Area: 6 km^{2} (2.3 sq mi)
- Length: 6 km (3.7 mi)
- Width: 1 km (0.6 mi)

Administration
- Ukraine
- Oblast: Mykolaiv Oblast
- Raion: Mykolaiv Raion

Demographics
- Population: Uninhabited (2001)

The Dovhyi Island (Ukrainian: острів Довгий, lit. 'Long Island') is a small sandy island in Mykolaiv Oblast, Ukraine.

The island along with Kruhlyi island serves as a separation of Yahorlyk Bay from Black Sea located at the western part of the bay. It is located to the south from Kinburn Peninsula. Dovhyi island is 6 km (3.7 mi) in length and about 1 km (0.62 mi) in width.

== See also ==
List of islands of Ukraine
