= Chilia Veche =

- Commune
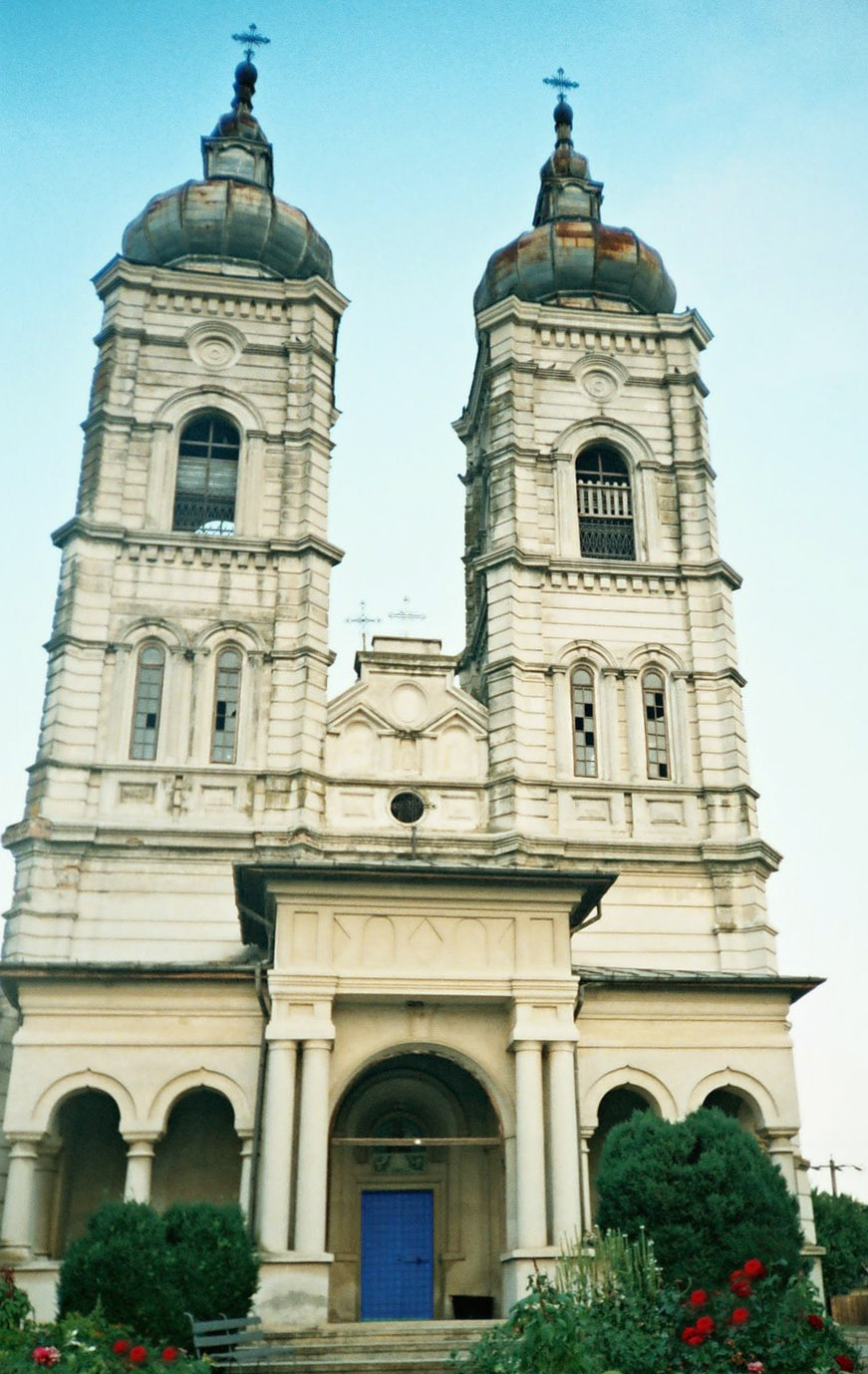
- Church in Chilia Veche

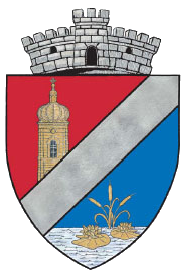
- Coat of arms

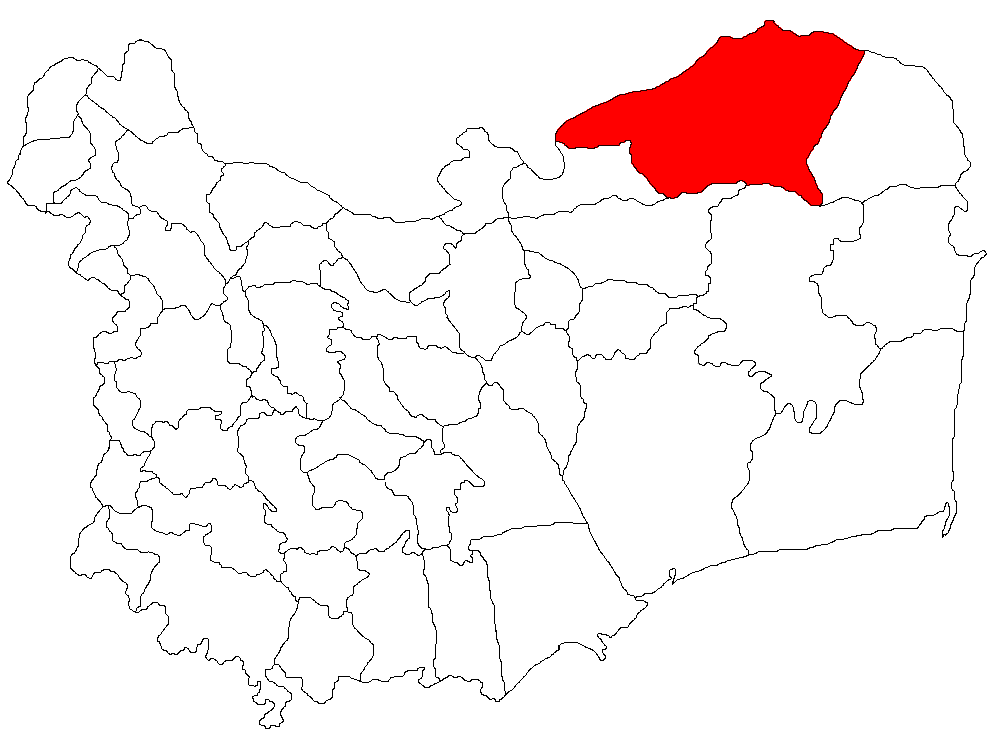
- Location in Tulcea County

- Location in Romania
- Coordinates: 45°25′N 29°17′E
- Country: Romania
- County: Tulcea
- Subdivisions: Chilia Veche, Câșlița, Ostrovu Tătaru, Tatanir

Government
  - Mayor (2024–2028): Timur-Alexandru Ciauș (PSD)
- Area: 533.58 km^{2} (206.02 sq mi)
- Elevation: 5 m (16 ft)
- Population (2021-12-01): 1,728
  - Density: 3.239/km^{2} (8.388/sq mi)
- Time zone: UTC+02:00 (EET)
  - Summer (DST): UTC+03:00 (EEST)
- Postal code: 827050
- Area code: +40 x40
- Vehicle reg.: TL
- Website: www.primariachilia.ro

Chilia Veche (Romanian pronunciation: /kiˈlija ˈveˈke/; meaning Old Chilia) is a commune in Tulcea County, Northern Dobruja, Romania, in the Danube Delta. It gave its name to the Chilia branch of the Danube, which separates it from Ukraine. It is composed of four villages: Câșlița, Chilia Veche, Ostrovu Tătaru and Tatanir.

Founded by the Greek Byzantines, it was given its name after the word for "granaries" - κελλίa, kellia, recorded earliest in 1241 in the works of Persian chronicler Rashid al-Din. Some scholars consider the mediaeval Genoese trade centre known as Lycostomo (Λυκόστομο) was also located here. A town on the other side of the Danube, now in Ukraine, known as Nova Kiliia (Romanian: Chilia Nouă) or "New Chilia", was built by Stephen the Great of Moldavia in order to counteract the Ottoman Empire (that had taken control of the former town in the 15th century).

Ostrovu Tătaru village, which has no permanent population, is located on Tătaru Mare Island.
