= Hvar Channel =

Channel in the Adriatic Sea

- Croatian: Hvarski kanal
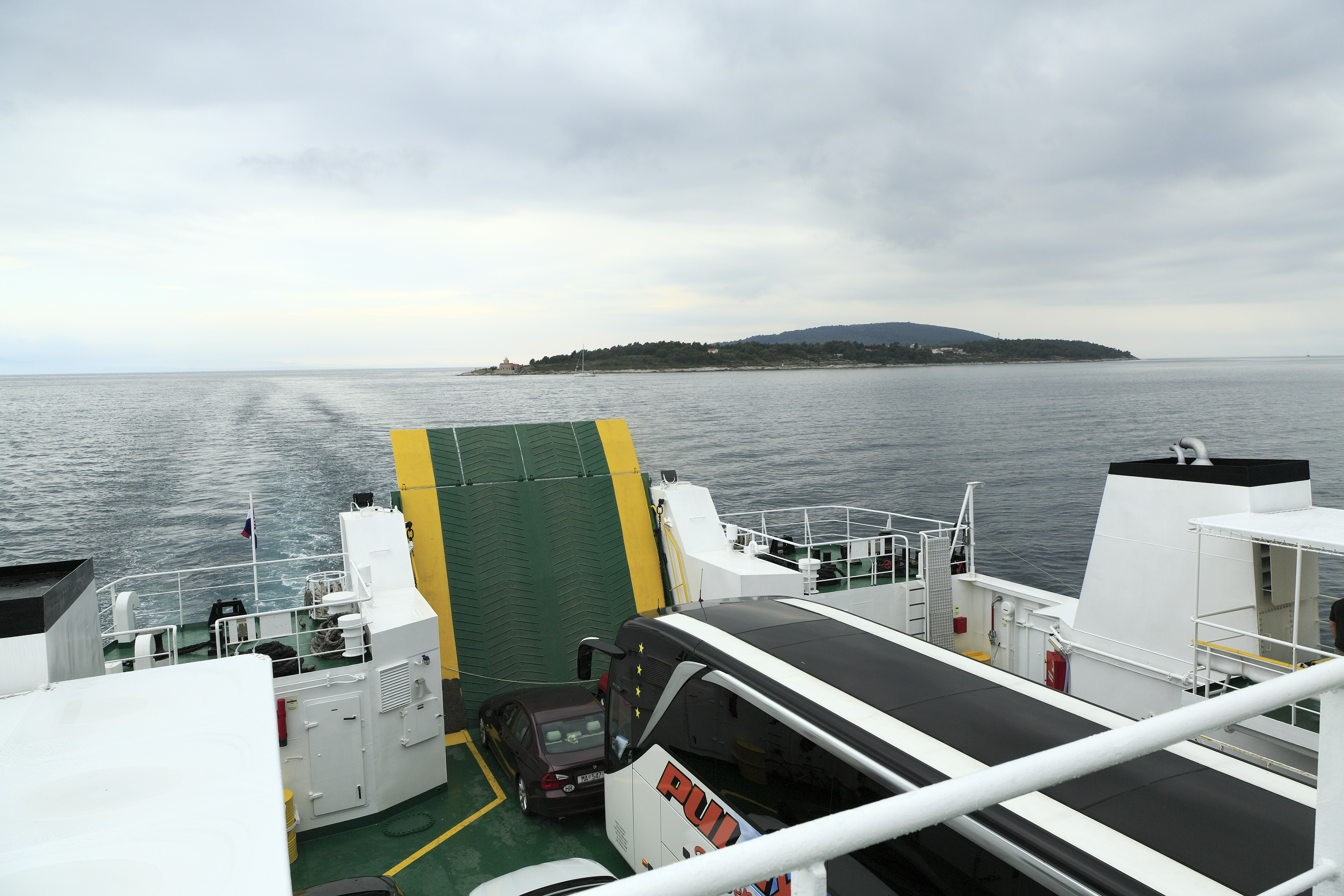
- The island of Hvar looks tiny but this is due to its elongated, narrow shape and is very deceptive.

- Location within Croatia
- Interactive map of Hvar Channel
- Coordinates: 43°14′33″N 16°37′49″E
- Part of: Adriatic Sea
- Basin countries: Croatia

The Hvar Channel (Croatian: Hvarski kanal) is a channel in the Adriatic Sea between the islands of Brač and Hvar.
