= Maican Island =

Ukrainian islet

Maican
Native name: Майкан
- Location within Odesa Oblast Location within Ukraine Location within Black Sea
- Interactive map of Maican

Geography
- Location: Danube, Chilia branch
- Coordinates: 45°26′17″N 29°23′41″E
- Length: 1.5 km (0.93 mi)
- Width: 0.7 km (0.43 mi)

Administration
- Ukraine

Demographics
- Population: 0

The Maican Island (Ukrainian: острів Майкан; Romanian: Insula Maican) is a Ukrainian islet in the Danube.

== Geography ==
The area of the island is 0.6 km², with a length of 1.5 km along the Danube riverbed, and a maximum width of 0.8 km. To the south of the island is the state border between Ukraine and Romania, established by the Treaty on Good Neighborliness and Cooperation between the two countries. According to international law, state borders along a river are established along the fairway, unless the parties have agreed otherwise. However, the fairway that used to run between the islands of Maican (Ukraine) and Babyna (Romania) has become silted up. As a result, shipping now runs between Maican and the Ukrainian coast. On this basis, in 2009. Romania expressed its territorial claims to the island in 2009.

The main reason for such claims is the huge losses Romania suffered after Ukraine put deepwater Danube-Black Sea canal into operation. The transfer of the island to Romania will allow the Romanian authorities to regain control over the shipping corridor on this section of the Danube.

Romania's territorial claims to Ukraine are not limited to the island of Maican. In 2004, Romania filed a lawsuit with the International Court of Justice to delimit the Black Sea shelf. As a result, Romania acquired about 9,000 km² or 79.34% of the disputed oil and gas shelf.

== See also ==
- Snake Island (Ukraine)
- List of islands of Ukraine
