= Black Sea Biosphere Reserve =

Protected area in littoral zone of Ukrainian northern Black Sea

- IUCN category Ia (strict nature reserve)
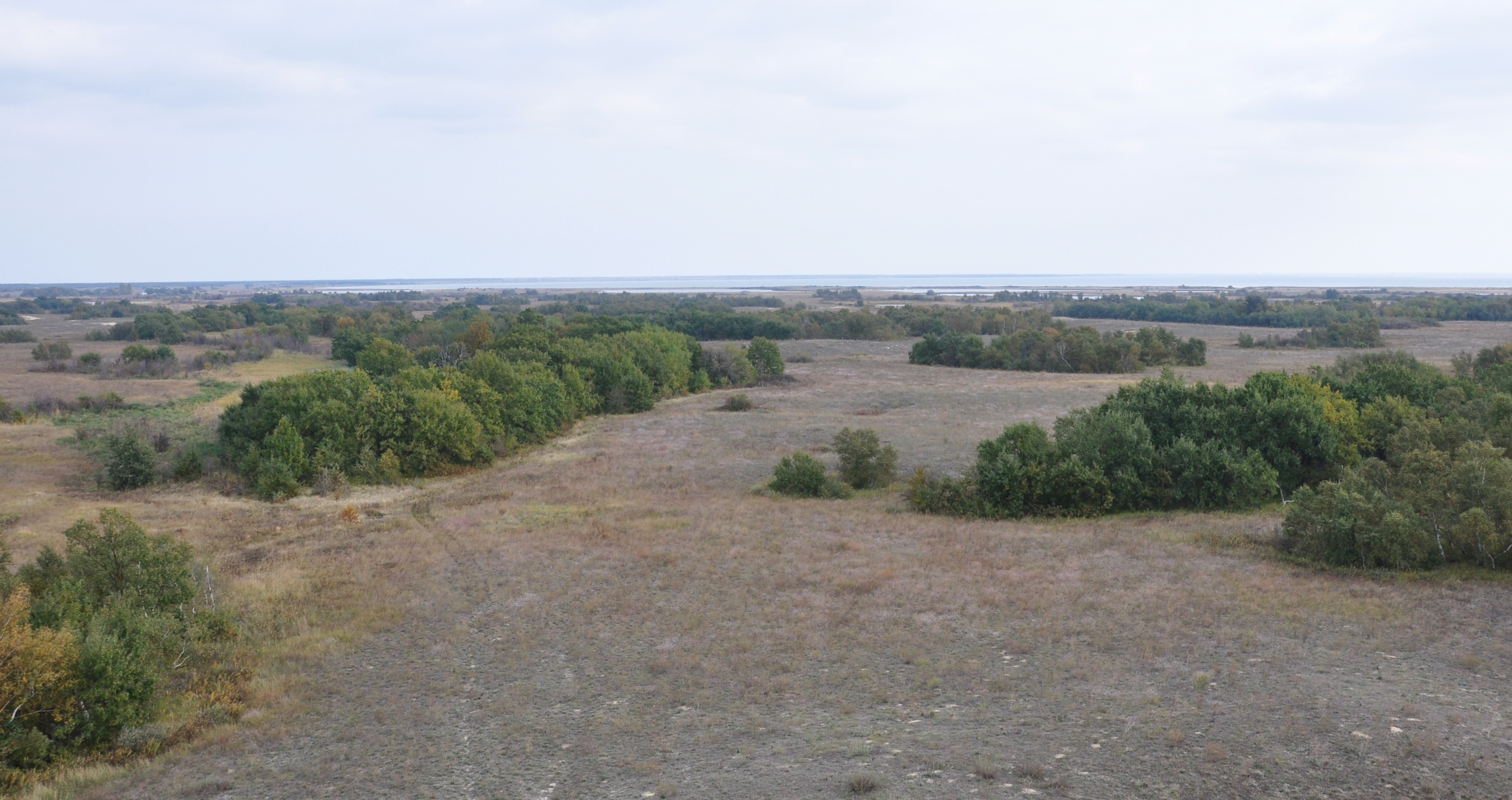
- View of Yahorlyk Bay, Black Sea Biosphere Reserve

- Location within Ukraine
- Location: Ukraine
- Coordinates: 46°15′00″N 31°52′00″E
- Area: 891.29 km^{2} (344.13 sq mi)
- Established: 1984
- Governing body: National Academy of Sciences of Ukraine
- Website: http://bsbr.org.ua/

The Black Sea Biosphere Reserve (Ukrainian: Чорноморський біосферний заповідник) is a biosphere reserve of Ukraine that is located at littoral zone of the northern Black Sea coast covering regions of the Kherson and Mykolaiv Oblasts and including Gulf of Tendra and Yahorlyk Bay. The reserve is part of the National Academy of Sciences of Ukraine.

== History ==
The preserve was initially established on July 14, 1927, as part of the Trans-Maritime Preserve by the decree No. 172 of the Council of People's Commissars of Ukrainian SSR. In 1933, the preserve became an independent research institution. In 1973 to the Black Sea Preserve were added the Danube floodplains, Kinski islands in Yahorlyk Bay, and the shallow portion of the Gulf of Tendra. Next year, the neighboring Yahorlyk reserve was annexed as well. In 1981, the Danube floodplains became an independent preserve. In 1983, there was established the Black Sea Biosphere Reserve that included the Black Sea State Preserve and the Yahorlyk State Ornithological Reserve (as its buffer zone). In December 1984, the reserve was accepted to the World Network of Biosphere Reserves. The territory of the preserve is included in the International list of Ramsar Convention.

The preserve was damaged in March 2022 during the Russian invasion of Ukraine, when ongoing fighting caused several fires in the area.

== Fauna ==
The fauna of the reserve includes about 3500 species. Among them are the most diverse insects, of which about 2200 species are known here, arachnids — 168 species, and mollusks — 65 species. Vertebrates are represented by 462 species, including a wide variety of birds — 304 species have been recorded. The reptile fauna comprises 9 species and is one of the most diverse among Ukrainian reserves. For all the years of observations in the marine waters of the reserve, 83 species of fish, or about 50% of the species composition of the Black Sea fish fauna, have been found. The terrestrial mammalian fauna includes 50 species, and the marine fauna — 3 species.

== See also ==
- List of nature reserves of Ukraine
- Environmental impact of the 2022 Russian invasion of Ukraine
