= Yahorlyk Kut =

Peninsula in Southern Ukraine

- Peninsula
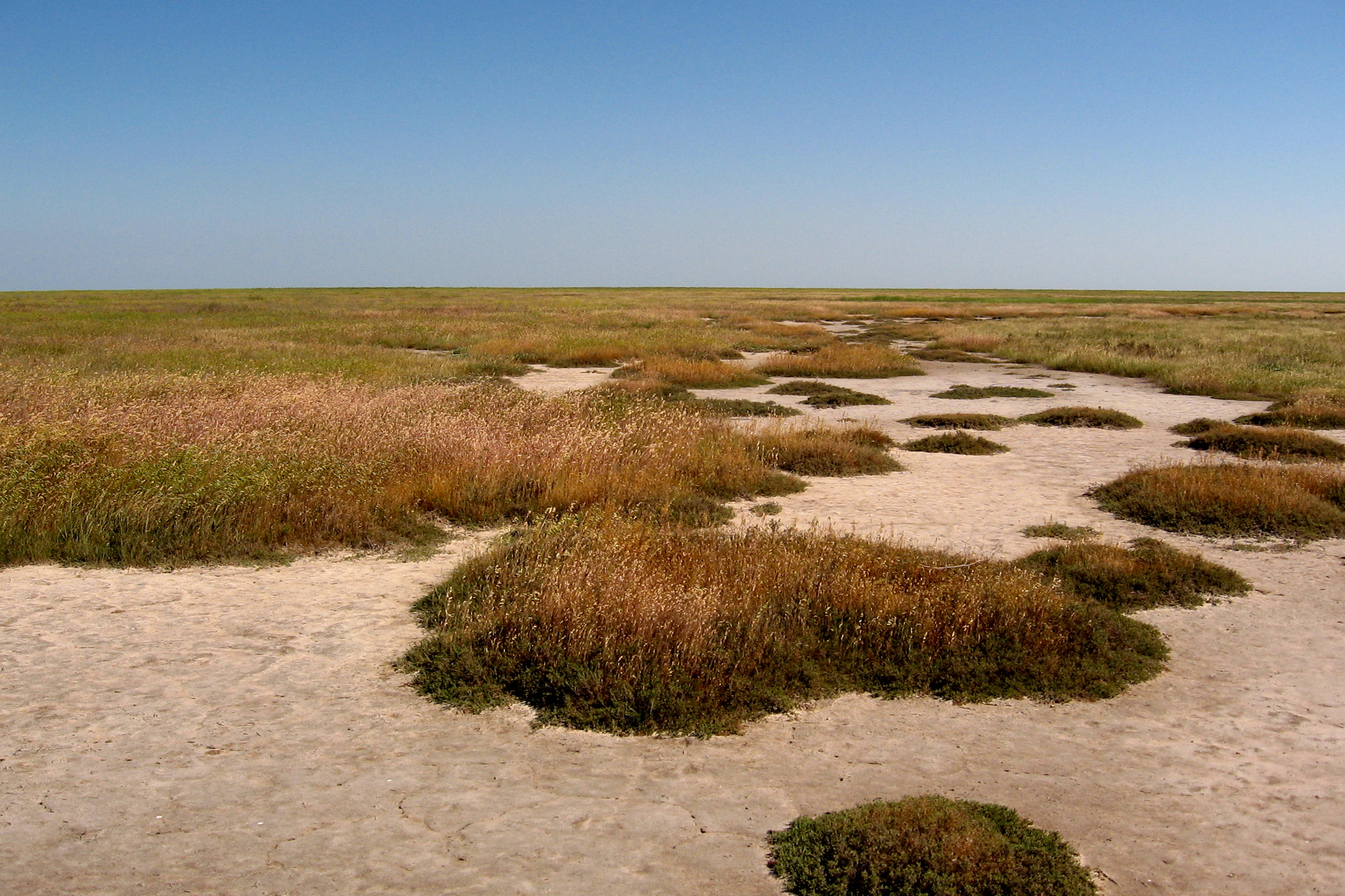
- Salt marshes within Yahorlyk Kut

- Interactive map of Yahorlyk Kut
- Coordinates: 46°17′59″N 31°49′47″E
- Location: Skadovsk district, Kherson Oblast, Ukraine

Yahorlyk Kut (Ukrainian: Ягорлицький Кут) is a peninsula in Southern Ukraine that separates Yahorlyk Bay from the Gulf of Tendra. Administratively the peninsula is part of Skadovsk Raion.

== Etymology ==
The name comes from combining Yahorlyk, which has multiple interpretations, but the most probable of which is from M. Fasmer, who derives it from the Turkish word ägri / ägrilik, which means crooked or curved. This is likely due to the crookedness of the peninsula's outline. It is combined with "kut", which is a Ukrainian word for a corner or nook, which describes the peninsula's shape.

== History ==
During the pre-19th century era, the land was used by nomadic pastoralists for sheep grazing, before in the 19th century becoming part of a German colonial estate to be used for livestock farming. It was also popular for fishing and salt extraction, with multiple settlements emerging nearby. After 1917, it became the area for a state sheep farm under Soyuzkarakulexport. From 1959 to 1994 it was used by the Soviet Air Force as a bombing range. During this time, most of the peninsula was transferred to the military, with less than 1000 hectares remaining under nature reserve protection.

At the end of July 2021, the Yahorlyk state test site was created in the area. It was created in response to the Annexation of Crimea, in which the Armed Forces of Ukraine lost the previous Chauda State Scientific and Testing Center. It is used for the firing of a range of weapons and testing long-range weapons after the development of the R-360 Neptune.

== Nature ==
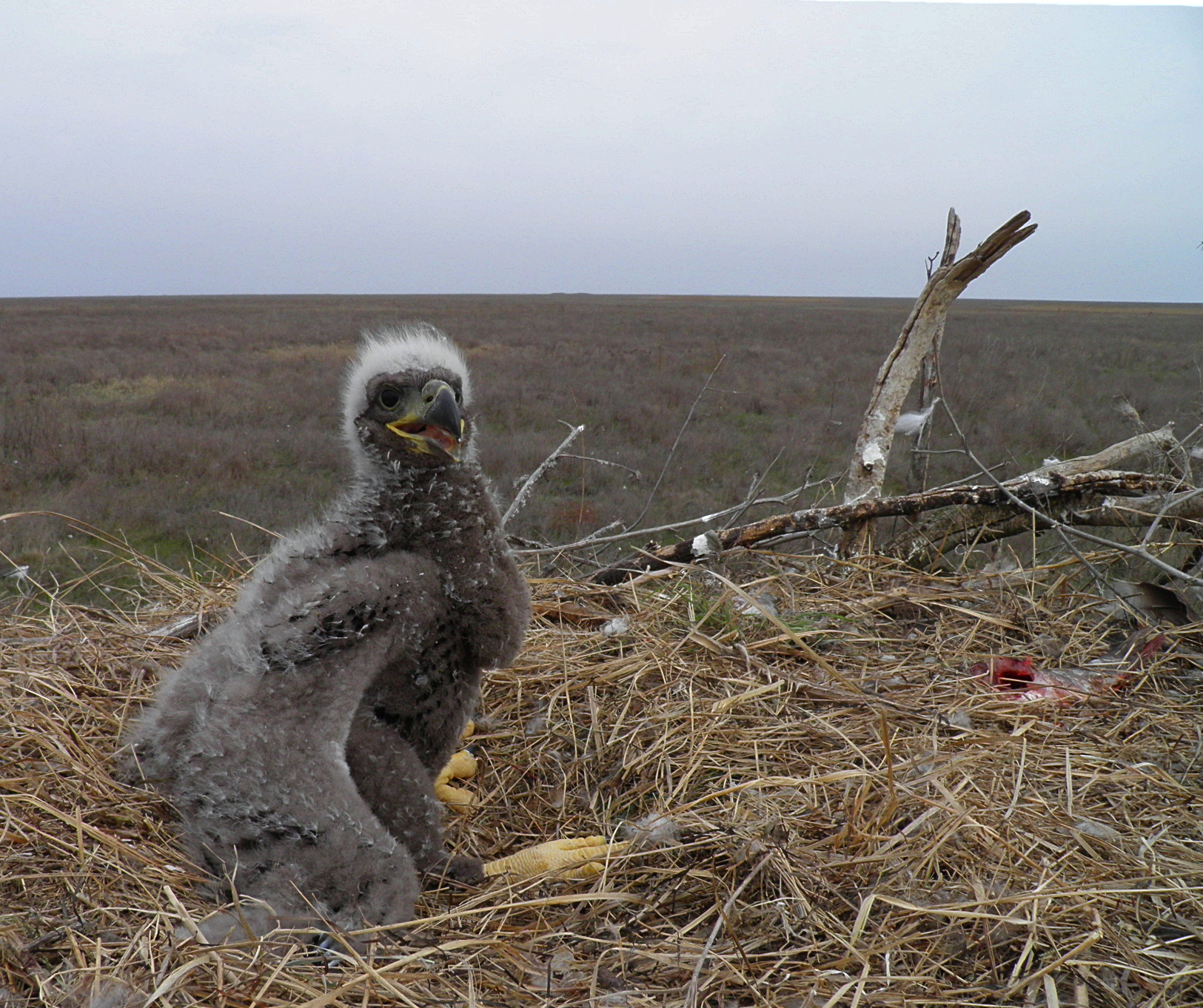
A white-tailed eagle in Yahorlyk Kut.

The landscape primarily consists of coastal salt marshes, reed thickets, continental lakes, and steppe fragments. It remains as one of the last intact coastal steppe zones in southern Ukraine, and remains highly biodiverse.

Yahorlyk Kut later became part of the Black Sea Biosphere Reserve due to it still containing the remains of Black Sea steppes and for also containing rare birds like the great bustard, little bustard, and the white-tailed eagle. It also supported a diffuse population of little ground squirrels, which were relatively abundant during the 1990s, but numbers of them have fallen due to the reduction of livestock grazing and overgrowth of steppe vegetation.
