= Dzharylhach =

Sandbank in Ukraine

Native name: Джарилгач
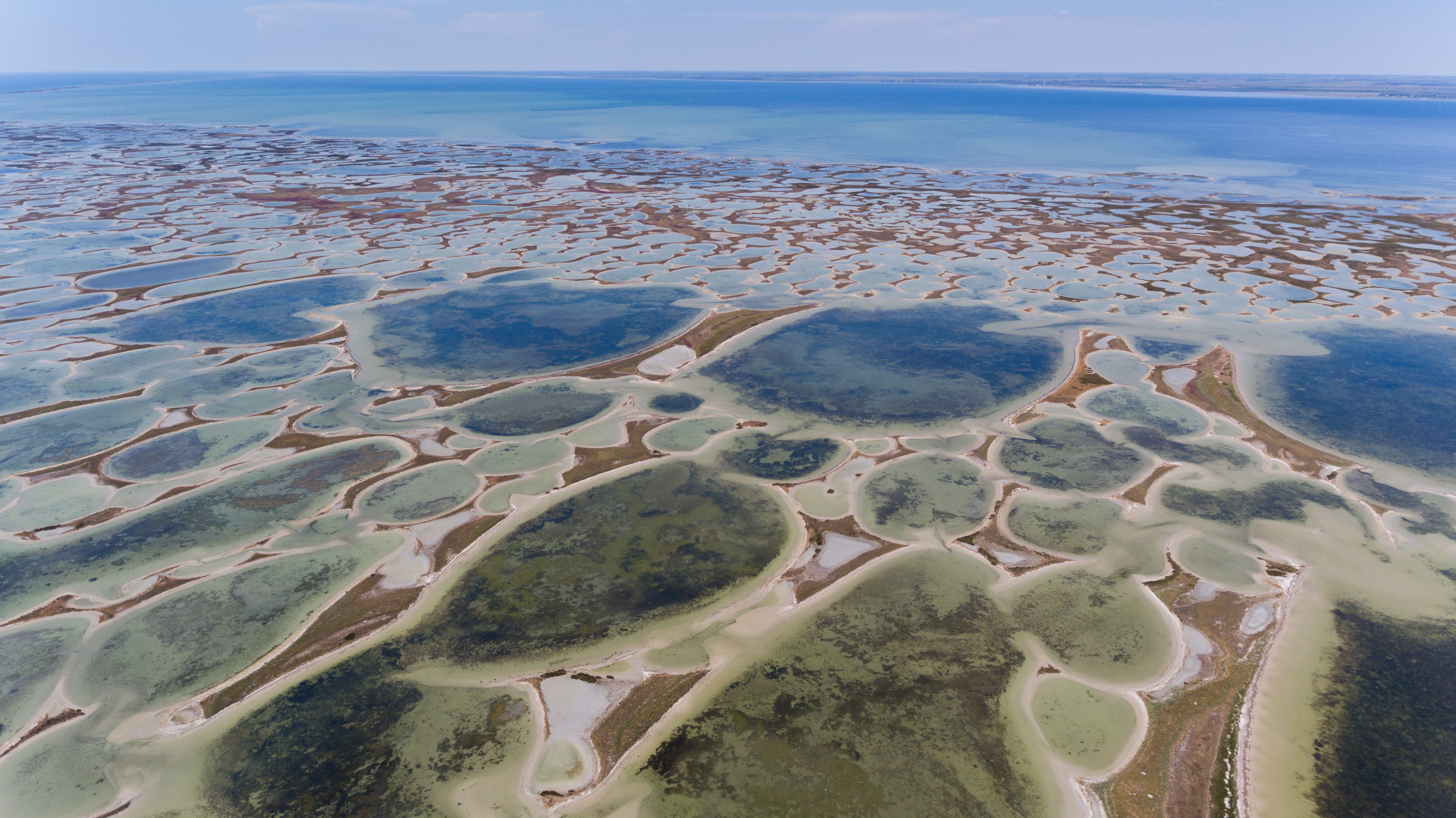
- The salt lakes of Dzharylhach

- Location within Kherson Oblast
- Interactive map of Dzharylhach

Geography
- Coordinates: 46.03°N 32.78°E
- Adjacent to: Karkinit Bay, Dzharylhach Bay
- Area: 56 km^{2} (22 sq mi)
- Length: 42 km (26.1 mi)
- Highest elevation: 2 m (7 ft)

Administration
- Ukraine
- Oblast: Kherson Oblast
- Raion: Skadovsk Raion

Demographics
- Population: Uninhabited (2001)2001 Ukrainian Census

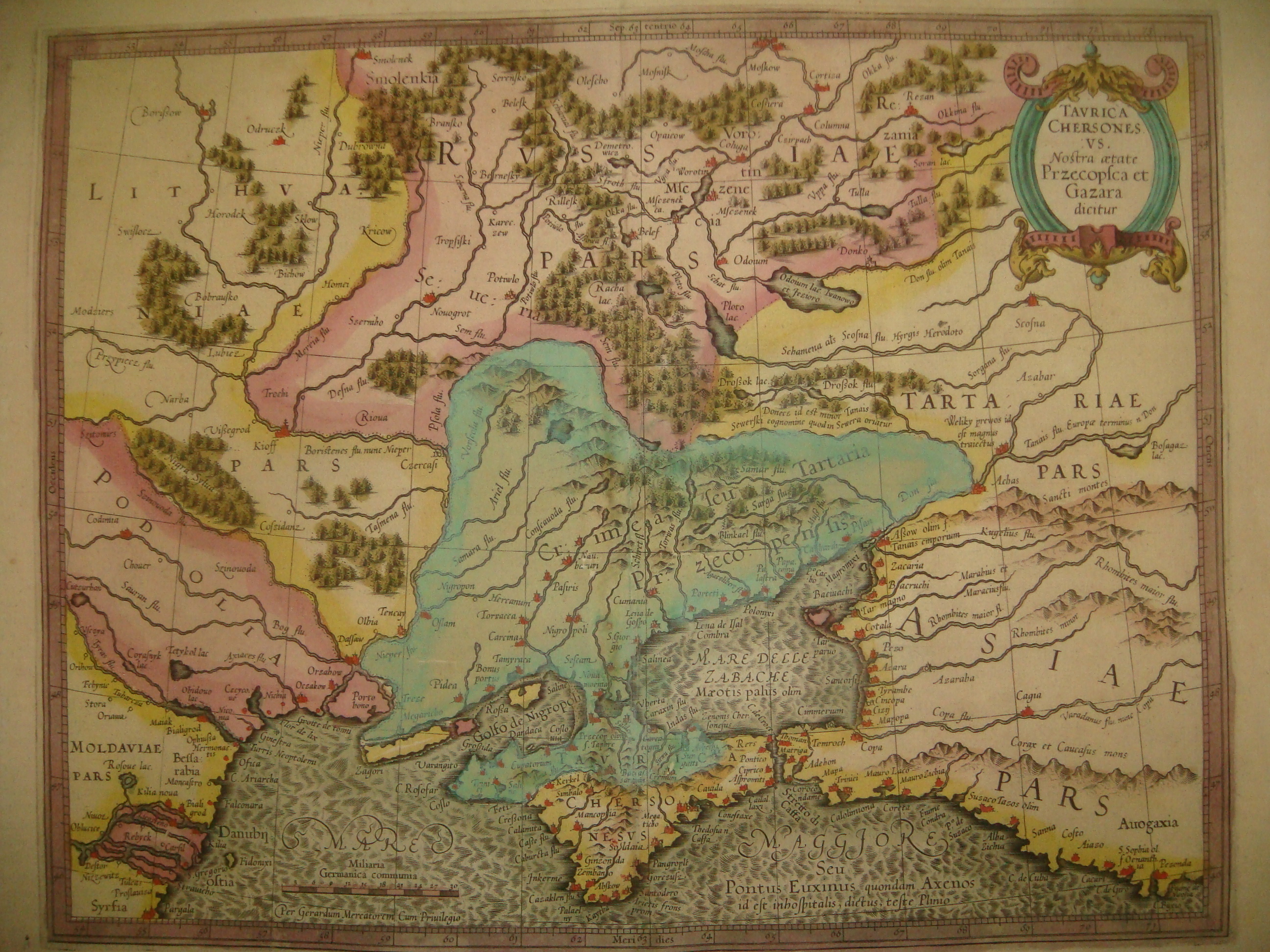
The Mercator's map

Dzharylhach (Cyrillic: Джарилгач, also spelled as Dzharylgach; Crimean Tatar: Carılğaç) is a sand bank in Skadovsk Raion, Kherson Oblast near Crimea in Ukraine. Along with the Tendra island that lies to the west, in the past it was a spit that Greeks called "Course of Achilles". To the west it stretches as a spit and as a shoal, which sometimes dries up, and connects to the continental portion of Kherson Oblast near the town of Lazurne. The wider portion used to be called Tamyraca. It was named after an ancient town of Tamyraca located on the continent across the bay.

Across from the island over the Dzharylhach Bay is the city of Skadovsk. Dzharylhach and its bay is part of the Dzharylhach National Nature Park.

Its area of 56 km^{2} and length of 42 km make it the Black Sea's biggest sand bank, located at the Karkinit Bay. The island has clean sandy beaches and mineral springs. In the middle of the island there is a fresh water spring, and more than four hundred small salty lakes are scattered all over its territory. The unique flora and fauna of Dzharylhach have been well preserved. It is a habitat for wild boars, deer, mouflon, as well as numerous seagulls and cormorant, hunting crabs, raps whelk and shrimp.

== Russian invasion of Ukraine ==
In the spring of 2023, Russian forces covered the crossing to the island with sand, permanently connecting it with the occupied part of the Kherson Oblast of Ukraine. They also created a military training ground on the island.

In August 2023, a large-scale fire occurred on the island. The fire destroyed more than 1,500 hectares of the area of the nature reserve on the island.

== Gallery ==
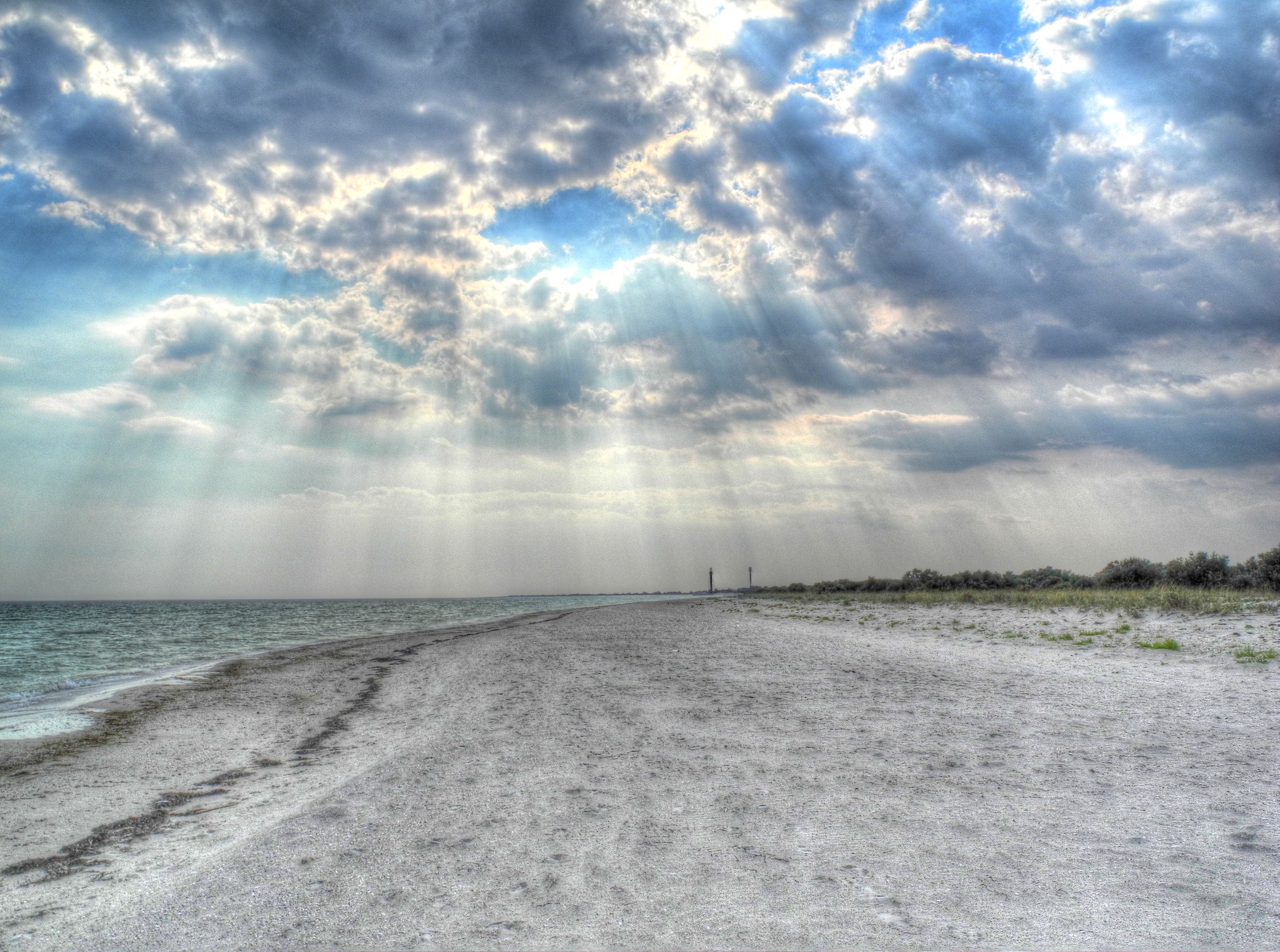
Dzharylhach beach line

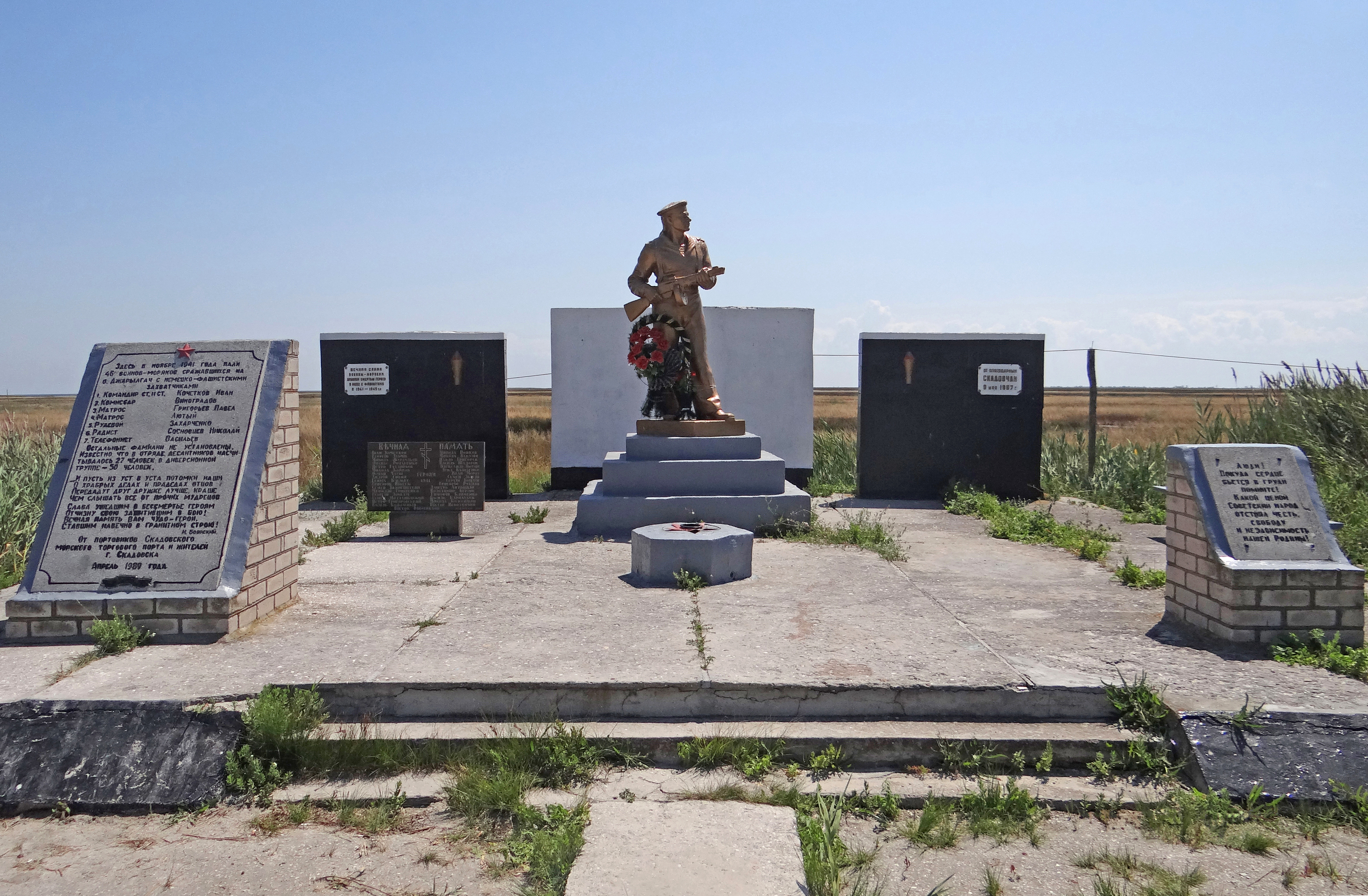
Mass grave of Soviet soldiers

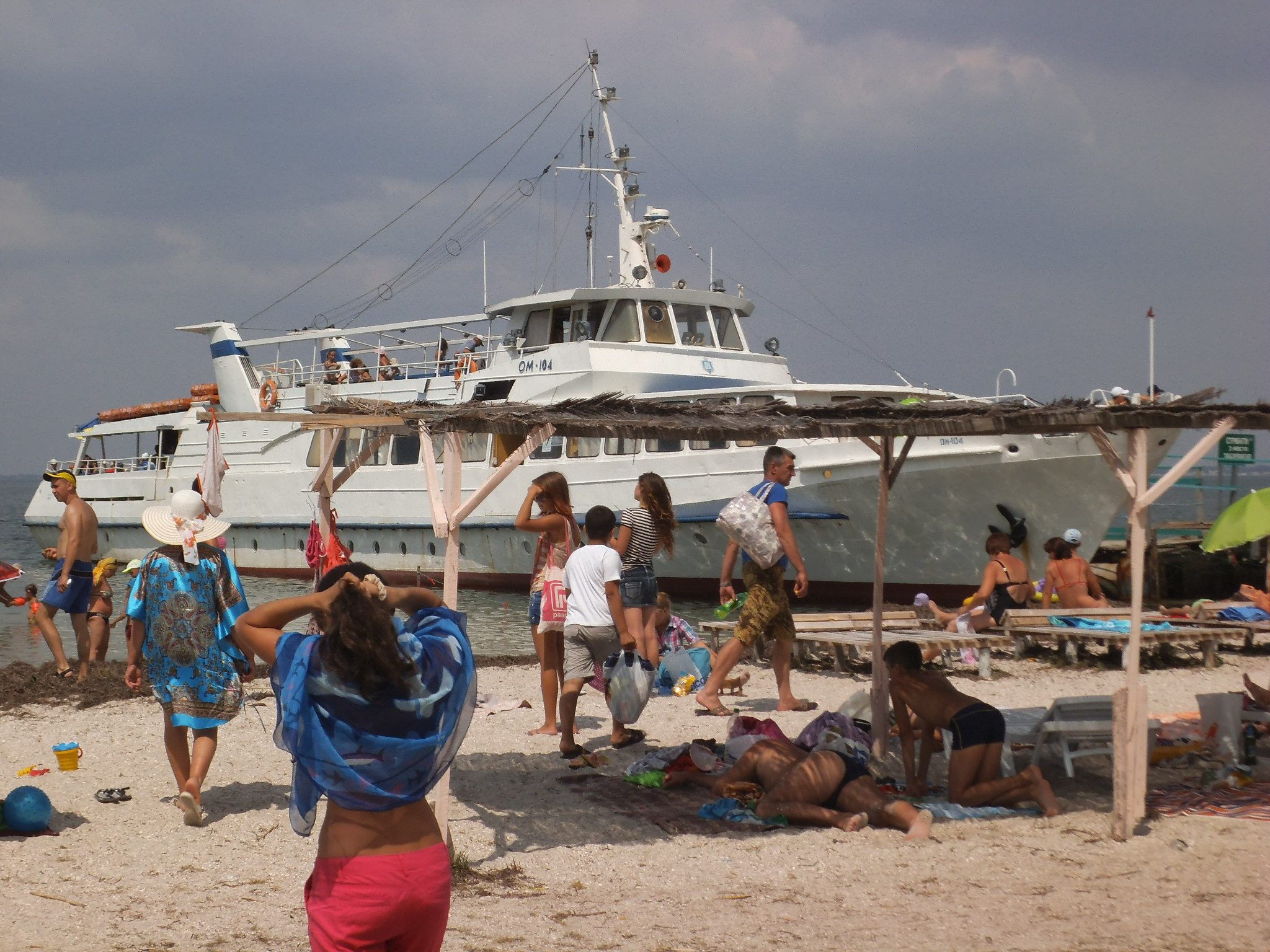
Beach resort with a pier (2013)

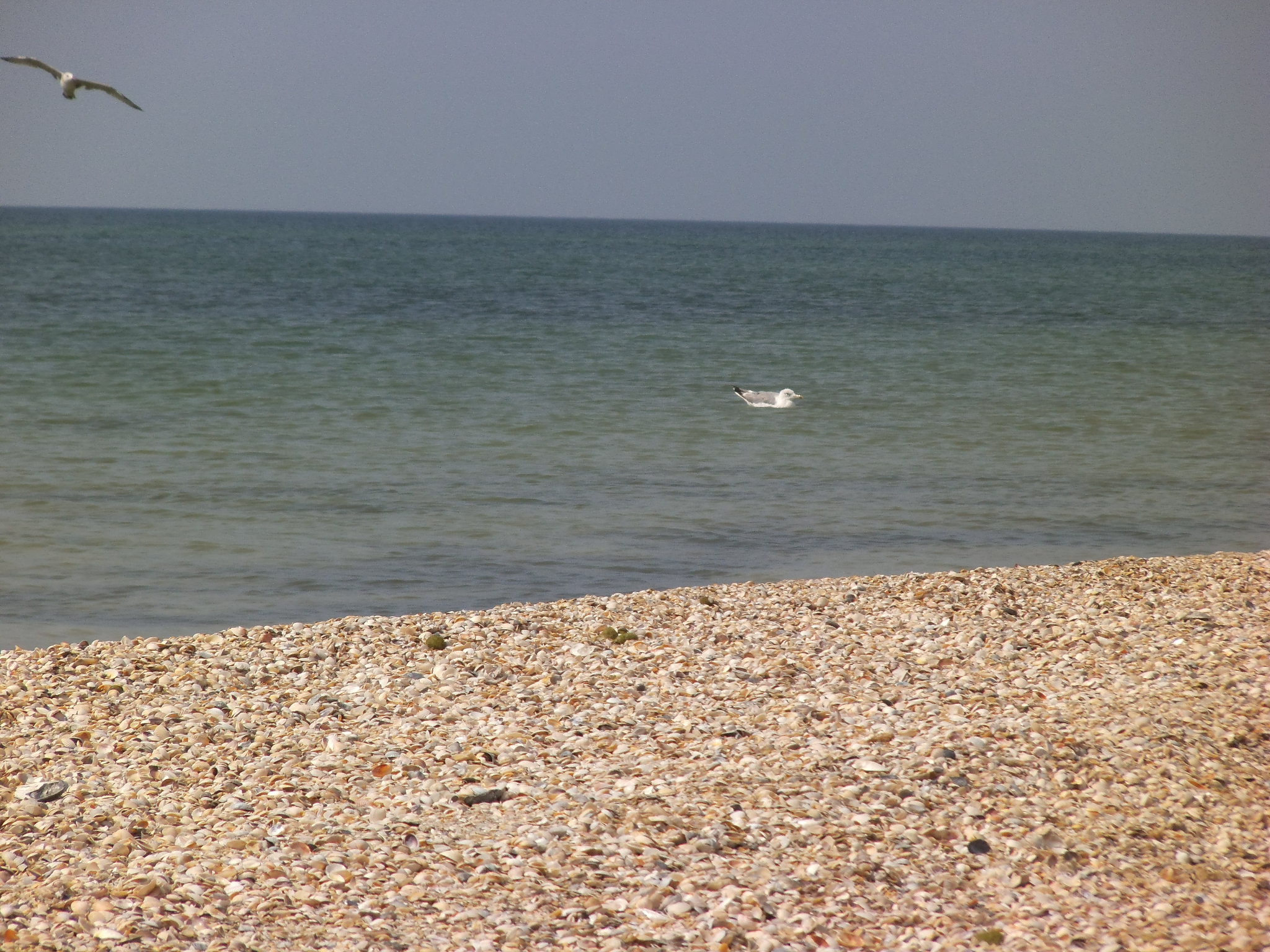
"Turtle beach" (2013)

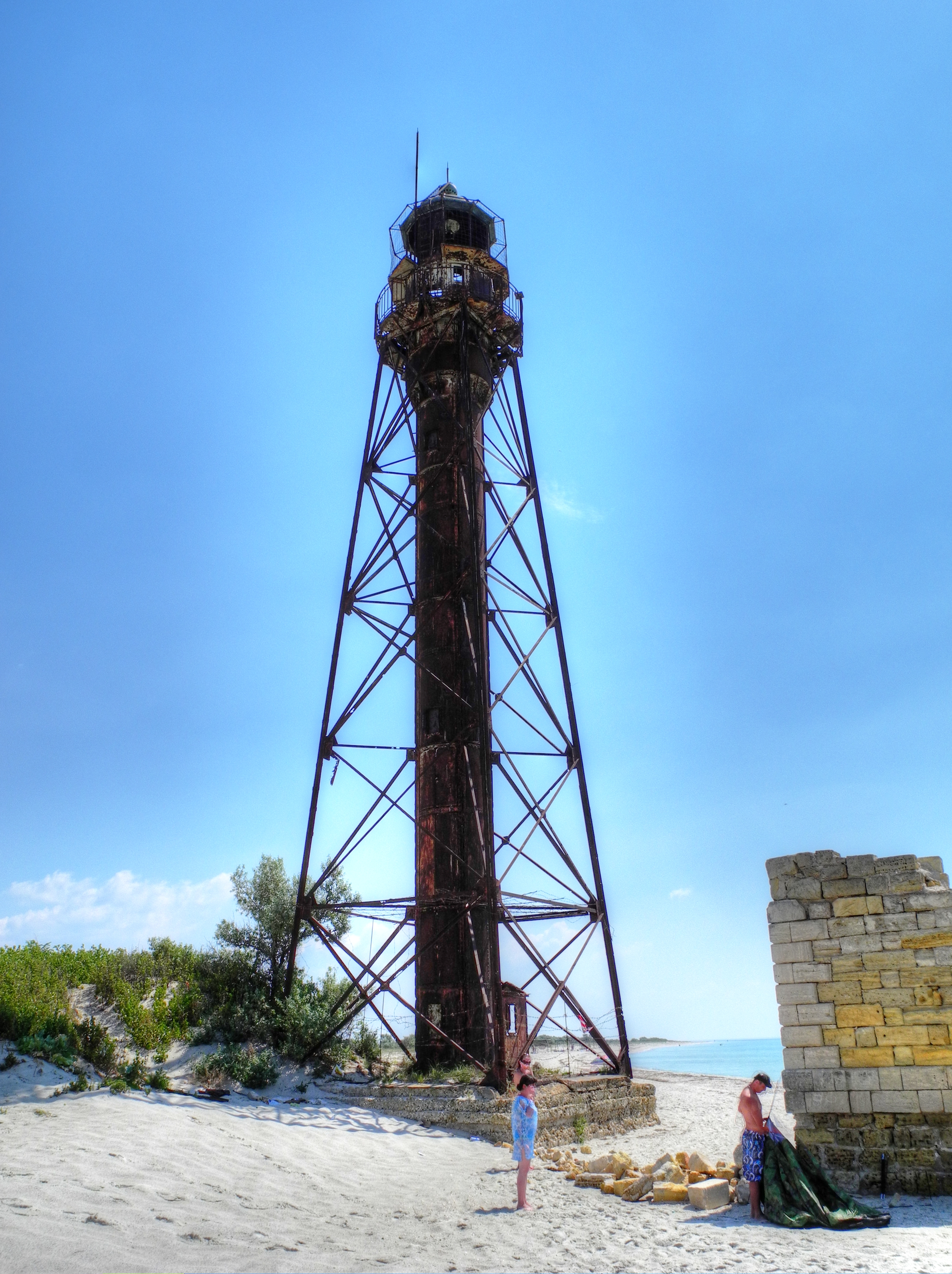
Old lighthouse

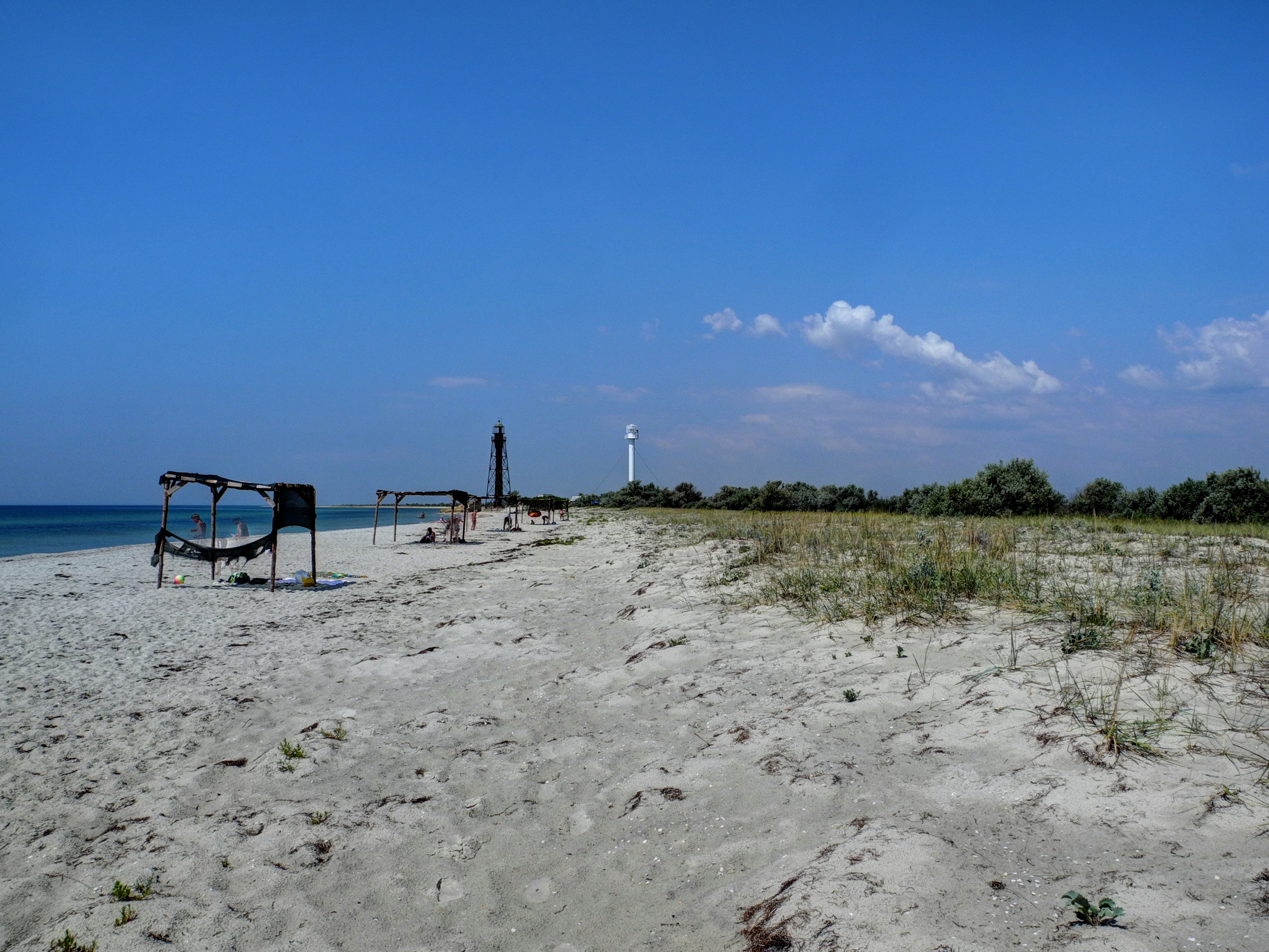
Another beach with two lighthouses in the background, old and new (2012)

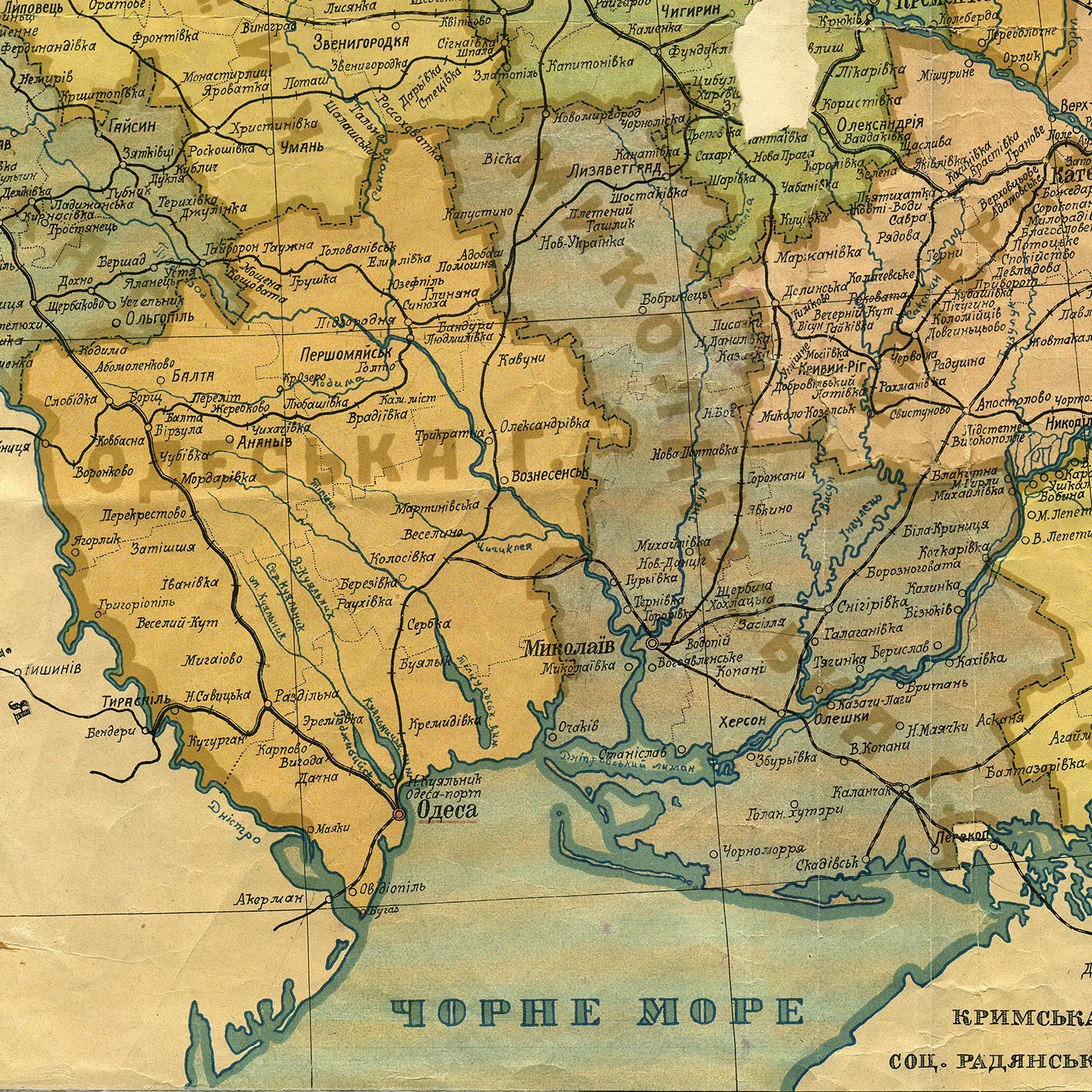
Map of Southern Ukraine (1922) where Dzharylhach is a spit (sandbar), not an island

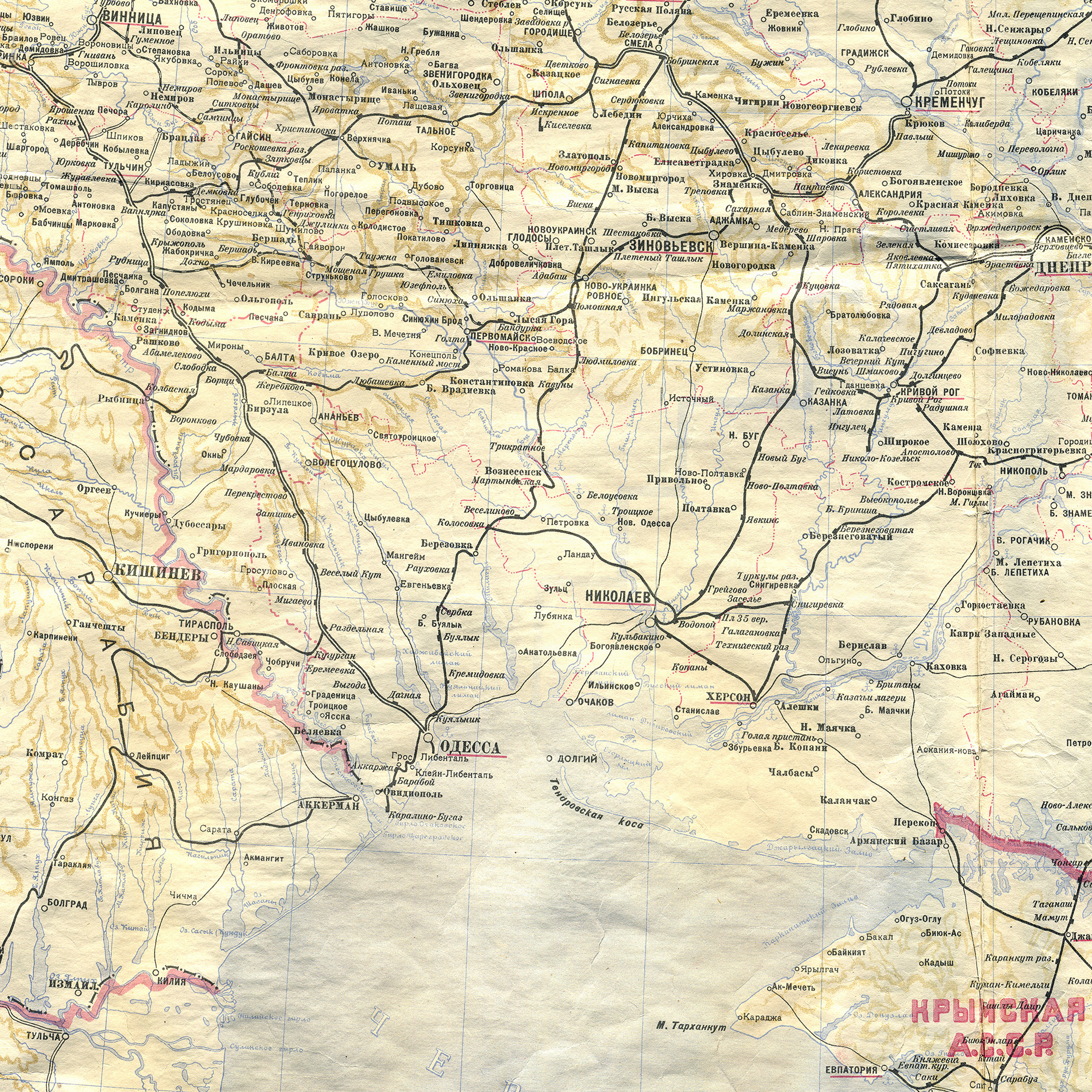
Map of Southern Ukraine (1928) where Dzharylhach is an island
