= Yahorlyk Bay =

Shallow water bay in Ukrainian north Black Sea

- Location within Kherson Oblast Location within Ukraine
- Interactive map of Yahorlyk Bay
- Location: Black Sea
- Coordinates: 46°24′N 31°49′E
- Ocean/sea sources: Atlantic Ocean
- Basin countries: Ukraine
- Max. length: 26 km (16 mi)
- Max. width: 15 km (9.3 mi)
- Max. depth: 5 m (16 ft)
- Salinity: 14-15 ‰
- Frozen: only during unusually harsh winters
- Islands: Dovhyi Island, Kruhlyi Island

Yahorlyk Bay (Ukrainian: Ягорлицька затока) is a shallow water bay near the coast of Ukraine (between peninsulas Yahorlyk Kut and Kinburn peninsula), northern Black Sea. The bay is separated from the sea by chain of islands Dovhyi and Kruhlyi. It is separated from the Gulf of Tendra by Yahorlyk Kut, and from the Dnieper-Bug estuary by the Kinburn Peninsula.

The water body has 26 km long, 15 km wide, up to 5 m depth.
