= Gulf of Tendra =

Tendra Bay

Coordinates: 46°12′N 32°01′E

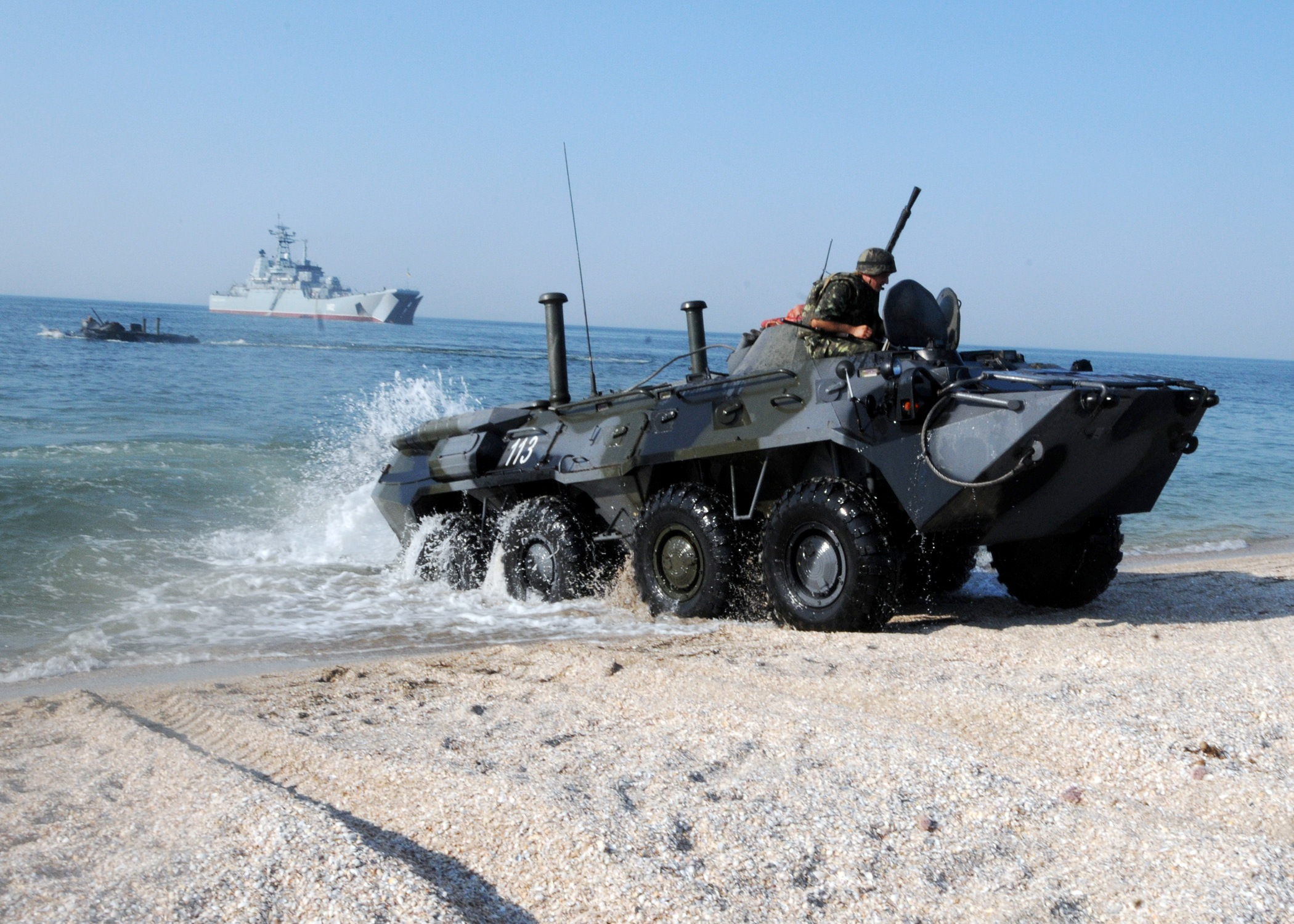
- Partnership for Peace operations on the Tendra Spit

- Location within Kherson Oblast Location within Ukraine
- Interactive map of Gulf of Tendra
- Location: Black Sea
- Ocean/sea sources: Atlantic Ocean
- Basin countries: Ukraine
- Max. length: 45 km (28 mi)
- Max. width: 7 km (4.3 mi)
- Max. depth: 6 m (20 ft)
- Salinity: 15-18 ‰

Gulf of Tendra or Tendra Bay (Ukrainian: Тендрівська затока) is a shallow water bay off the coast of Ukraine (south of the Yahorlyk Kut peninsula), northern Black Sea. The gulf is separated from the sea by the Tendra Spit. The gulf is 45 km long, 7 km wide, and up to 6 m depth.

It is included in the Black Sea Biosphere Reserve. From 1993 to 2003 it was included in the Montreux Record.
