= Lists of islands =

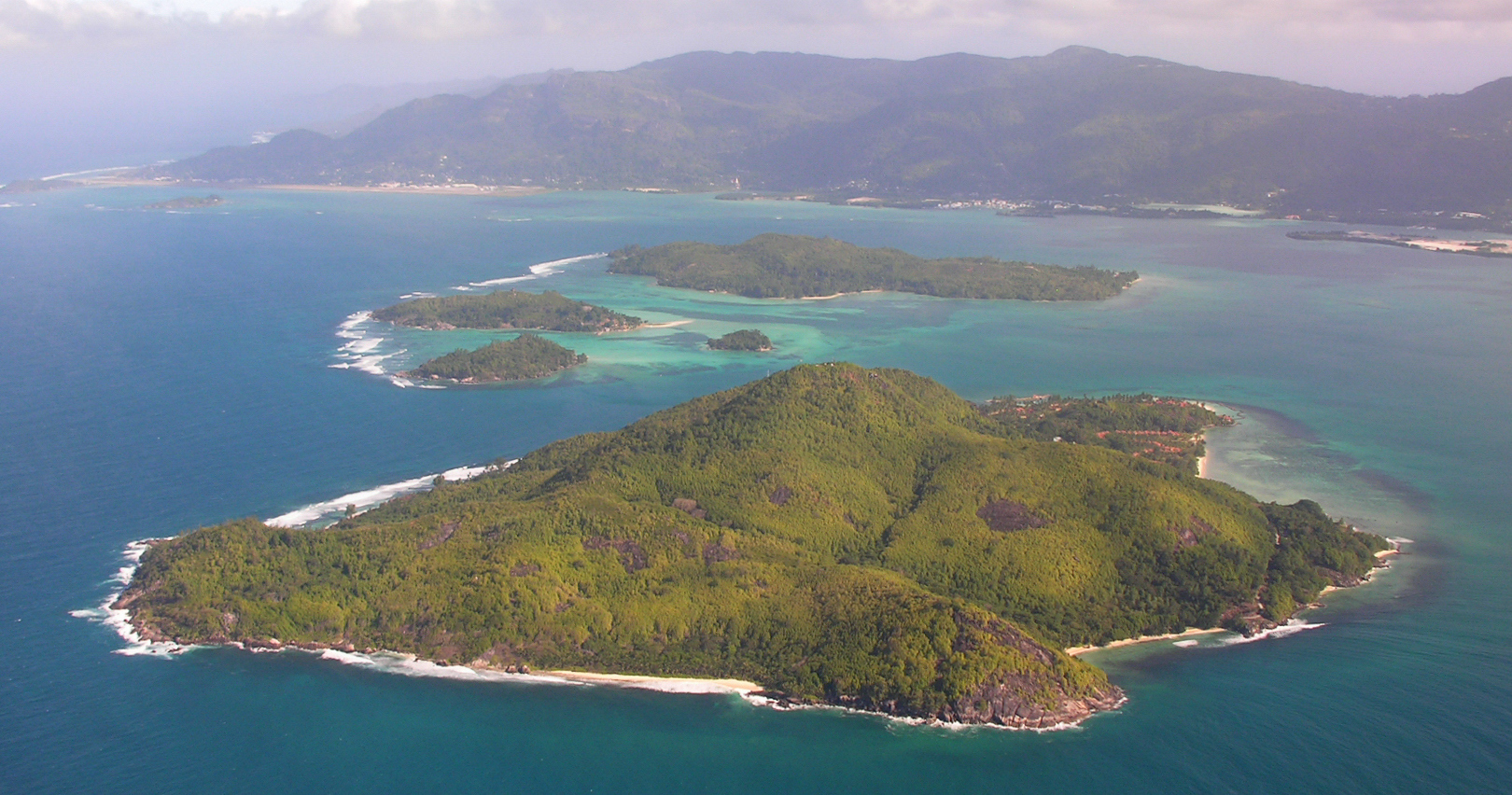
An aerial view of islands in the Seychelles

This is a list of the lists of islands in the world grouped by country, by continent, by body of water, and by other classifications. For rank-order lists, see the other lists of islands below.

== By country or location ==
=== Africa ===
- Ascension Island (United Kingdom)
- Algeria
- Angola
- British Indian Ocean Territory (United Kingdom)
- Cape Verde
- Comoros
- Djibouti
- Equatorial Guinea
- Eritrea
- Ethiopia
- Guinea Bissau
- Madagascar
- Malawi
- Mayotte (France)
- Namibia
- Nigeria
- Saint Helena (United Kingdom)
- São Tomé and Príncipe
- Senegal
- Seychelles
- South Africa
- Tanzania
- Tristan da Cunha (United Kingdom)

=== Antarctica ===
- British Antarctic Territory
- NZ Subantarctic Islands (New Zealand)
- List of Antarctic and subantarctic islands

=== Asia ===
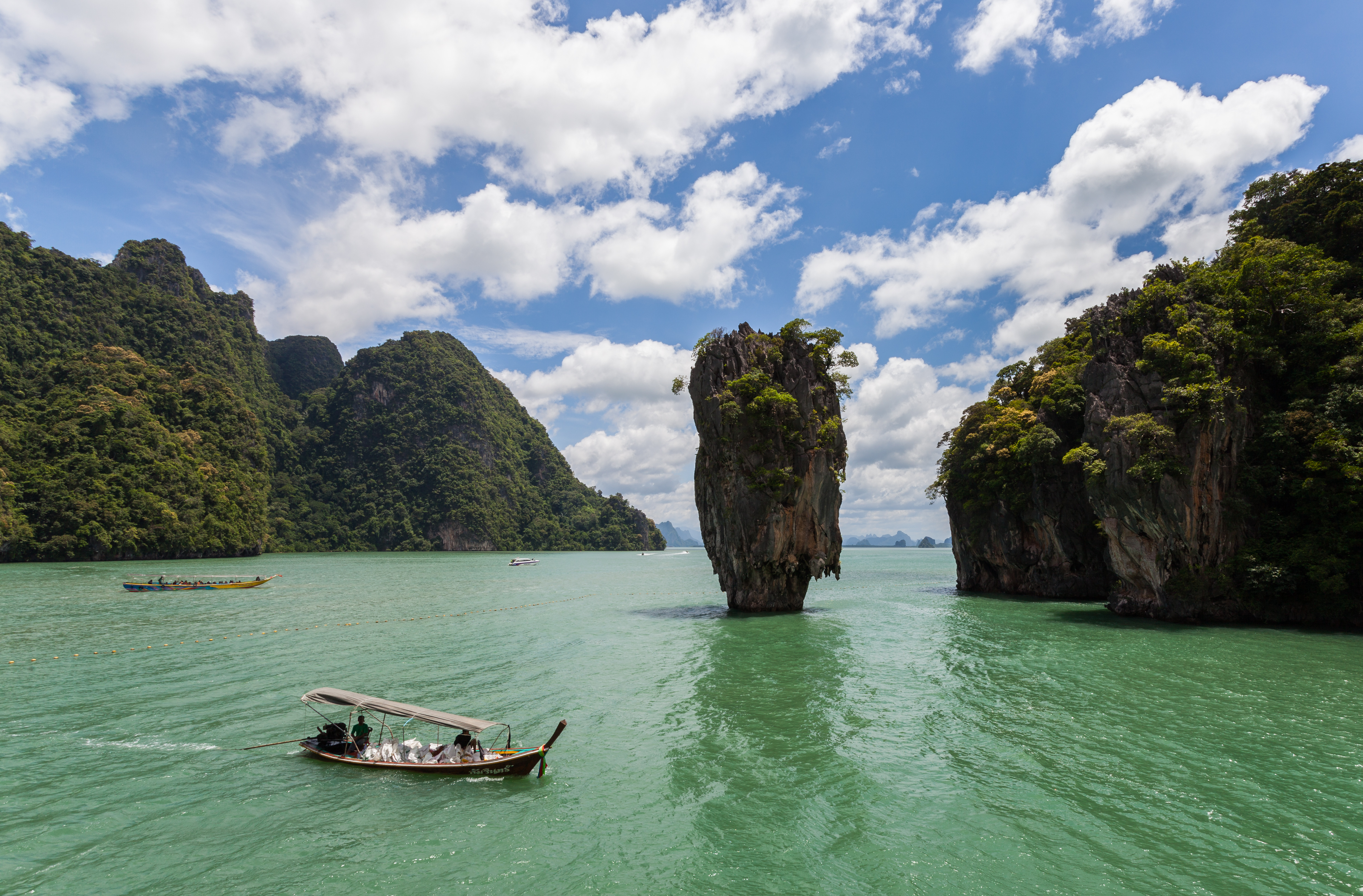
Ko Tapu (James Bond Island), Phang Nga province, Thailand

- Azerbaijan
- Bahrain
- Bangladesh
- Brunei
- Cambodia
- China
- East Timor
- Hong Kong
- India
- Indonesia
- Iran
- Iraq
- Israel
- Japan
- North Korea
- South Korea
- Kuwait
- Macau
- Malaysia
- Maldives
- Myanmar
- Pakistan
- Philippines
- Qatar
- Saudi Arabia
- Singapore
- Sri Lanka
- Syria
- Taiwan
- Thailand
- Turkey
- United Arab Emirates
- Vietnam
- Yemen

=== Europe ===
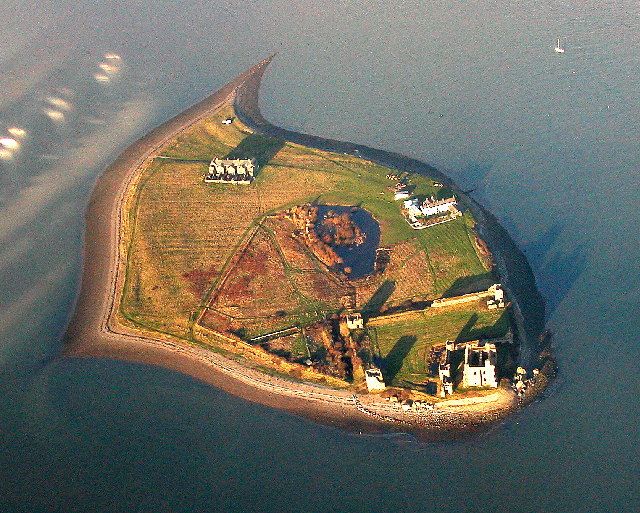
Piel Island, Cumbria. U.K.

- Albania
- Bulgaria
- Croatia
- Cyprus
- Denmark
- Estonia
- Faroe Islands (Denmark)
- Finland
- France
- Germany
- Greece
- Guernsey (United Kingdom)
- Hungary
- Iceland
- Republic of Ireland (inland islands)
- Isle of Man (United Kingdom)
- Italy
- Jersey (United Kingdom)
- Latvia
- Lithuania
- Malta
- Montenegro
- Netherlands
- North Macedonia
- Norway
- Poland
- Portugal
- Romania
- Russia
- Serbia
- Slovakia
- Slovenia
- Spain
- Sweden
- Switzerland
- Ukraine
- United Kingdom
  - England
  - Northern Ireland
  - Scotland
  - Wales

=== North America ===
- Anguilla (United Kingdom)
- Antigua and Barbuda
- Bahamas
- Barbados
- Belize
- Bermuda (United Kingdom)
- British Virgin Islands (United Kingdom)
- Canada
- Cayman Islands (United Kingdom)
- Costa Rica
- Cuba
- Dominica
- Dominican Republic
- El Salvador
- Greenland (Denmark)
- Grenada
- Guadeloupe (France)
- Guatemala
- Haiti
- Honduras
- Jamaica
- Kingdom of the Netherlands
  - Aruba
  - Curaçao
  - Sint Maarten
  - Caribbean Netherlands
- Martinique (France)
- Mexico
- Montserrat (United Kingdom)
- Nicaragua
- Panama
- Puerto Rico
- Saint Barthélemy (France)
- Saint Kitts and Nevis
- Saint Lucia
- Saint Martin (France)
- Saint Vincent and the Grenadines
- Trinidad and Tobago
- Turks and Caicos Islands (United Kingdom)
- United States (by area)
- United States Virgin Islands

=== Australia and Oceania ===
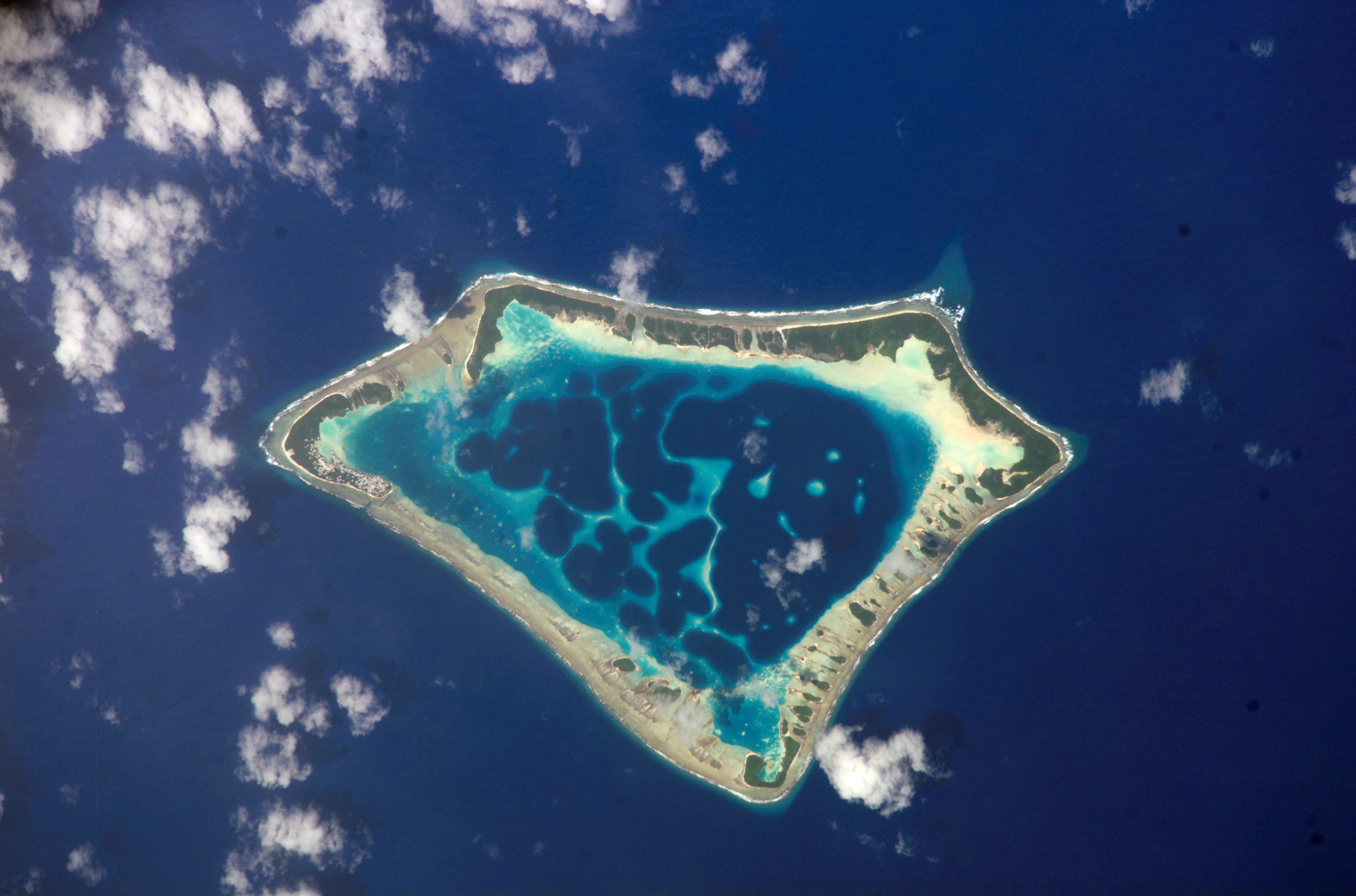
Atafu island in Tokelau

- American Samoa (United States)
- Australia
- Fiji
- Hawaii
- Kiribati
- Marshall Islands
- Federated States of Micronesia
- Nauru
- New Caledonia (France)
- New Zealand (outlying islands)
- Palau
- Papua New Guinea
- Pitcairn Islands (United Kingdom)
- Samoa
- Solomon Islands
- Tonga

=== South America ===
- Argentina
- Bolivia
- Brazil
- Chile
- Colombia
- Ecuador
- Falkland Islands
- French Guiana (France)
- Guyana
- Paraguay
- Peru
- South Georgia and the South Sandwich Islands (United Kingdom)
- Suriname
- Uruguay
- Venezuela

== By continent ==
- Africa
- Americas
  - North America
    - Caribbean
    - Central America
  - South America
- Antarctica
- Asia
- Europe
  - European islands by area
  - European islands by population
- Oceania
  - Australia
  - New Zealand

== By body of water ==
=== By ocean ===
- Arctic Ocean
- Atlantic Ocean
  - Baltic Sea
  - Black Sea
  - Caribbean Sea
  - Irish Sea
  - Mediterranean Sea
    - Adriatic Sea
    - Aegean Sea
    - Ionian Sea
- Indian Ocean
  - Persian Gulf
- Pacific Ocean
  - East China Sea
  - South China Sea
- Southern Ocean

=== By other bodies of water ===
- Lake islands
  - Great Lakes (North America)
- Red Sea
- River islands
  - Danube River (Europe)

== Ancient islands ==
- Afro-Eurasia
- America
- Antarctica
- Australia
- Doggerland
- Hawaiian–Emperor seamount chain (Pacific, extension of Hawaiian Islands)
- Ile Du Sud- African Banks (in the Amirantes)
- Insular Islands, Pacific
- Intermontane Islands, Pacific
- Majority of granitic Seychelles, which were remnants of India splitting from Africa to form Madagascar.
- Majority of the Great Chagos Bank
- Nazareth Bank
- Owen Bank, Chagos Arch., submerged atoll
- Owen Bank (Seychelles) (not to be confused with Chagos atoll)
- Saya de Malha, Formerly largest Mascarene Island
- Soudan, Mascarenes
- The ancient volcanic island of Cargados Carajos, which sank to a coral atoll
- The majority of the Alphonse Atoll, Seychelles
- Thorpe Bank, Seychelles
- Topaze Bank, Seychelles
- Walters Shoals, just south of Madagascar, was once a large tropical island.
- Zealandia (the Antipodes)

== Other lists ==
- Body of water
- Landmass
- List of archipelagos
- List of archipelagos by number of islands
- List of artificial islands
- List of countries by number of islands
- List of divided islands
- List of fictional islands
- List of island countries
- List of islands by area
- List of islands by highest point
- List of islands by name
- List of islands by population
- List of islands by population density
- List of islands in lakes
- List of islands named after people
- List of islands of Europe
- List of islands created since the 20th century
- List of phantom islands
- List of private islands
- List of tallest lake islands
- Recursive islands and lakes
- Lost lands
- Former island

== See also ==
- List of peninsulas
