= List of islands in the Black Sea =

This is a list of islands in the Black Sea.

== Bulgaria ==
- Ambelits Island (Bulgarian: Остров Амбелиц), bay of Lozenets
- Bird Island (Bulgarian: Птичи остров), in Arapya Bay
- Crocodile Island (Остров Крокодила), in Stomoplo Bay
- St. Anastasia Island (Остров Света Анастасия), in Atiya Bay
- St. Cyricus Island (Остров Св. Кирик), bay of Sozopol (with artificial connection to Sozopol)
- St. Ivan Island (Остров Св. Иван), bay of Sozopol
- St. Peter Island (Остров Св. Петър), bay of Sozopol
- St. Thomas Island (Snake Island) (Остров Св. Тома (Змийски остров)), bay of Arkoutino

== Romania ==
- K Island (Romanian: Insula K) - divided with Ukraine
- Sacalin Island
- Insula Sulinei

== Russia ==
- Krupinin Island
- Sudzhuk Island
- Utrish Island

== Turkey ==
- Giresun Island
- Hoynat Islet
- Kefken Island
- Öreke Islands
- Tavşan Islet

== Ukraine ==
- Adalary, pair of rocks near Gurzuf, Crimea
- Berezan Island
- Dovhyi Island and smaller Kruhly, Velyky and Konsky islands in the Yahorlyk Bay
- Dzharylhach Island - the largest one in the Black Sea (56 km^{2})
- Kalanchak Islands, Oyster Islands, and others in the Karkinit Bay, east of Dzharylhach, near Crimea
- Nova Zemlya (Ukrainian: Нова Земля) - divided with Romania
- Orlov Island, Yahorlyk Islands, Siberian Islands, Babyn Island and a few others in the Gulf of Tendra
- Snake Island
- Swan Islands in Karkinit Bay, off northwestern Crimean coast
- Tendra Spit, a spit which is separated into several islands.
- Rocks-ships, rocks south of Opuk Cape, Kerch peninsula

Islands in the numerous estuaries:

- Kozachyi Island in the Dnieper Estuary, south of Ochakiv
- Yanushev Island, Verbky Islands, Tendra Island and other along the southern coast of the Dnieper Estuary

== See also ==
- List of islands
