= List of islands of Europe =

This is a list of the larger offshore islands of Europe.

== In the Atlantic Ocean ==
- Major islands and the island groups of the British Isles
  - Great Britain
  - Ireland

England

- Isle of Wight
- Isle of Sheppey
- Hayling Island
- Foulness Island
- Portsea Island
- Canvey Island
- Mersea Island
- Walney Island
- Wallasea Island
- Lundy
- Isles of Scilly

Scotland

Main archipelagoes

- Shetland
- Orkney
- Outer Hebrides
- Inner Hebrides
- Islands of the Clyde
- Islands of the Forth
- Outlying islands

Largest islands

- Lewis and Harris
- Skye
- Mainland, Shetland
- Mull
- Islay
- Mainland, Orkney
- Arran
- Jura
- South Uist
- North Uist

Wales

- Anglesey
- Holy Island

Ireland

- Achill Island
- Aran Islands
- Rathlin Island

Isle of Man

- Isle of Man
- Calf of Man

- Channel Islands

- Jersey
- Guernsey
- Alderney
- Sark

- Major Danish islands:

- Samsø
- Sejerø

- Major Swedish islands:

- Orust
- Hisingen
- Tjörn

- Other major Atlantic islands:

- Azores (Portugal) - politically and culturally associated with Europe
- Madeira (Portugal) - politically and culturally associated with Europe
- Canary Islands (Spain) - politically and culturally associated with Europe
- Faroe Islands (Denmark)
- Greenland (Denmark) - geographically a part of the continent of North America, politically and culturally associated with Europe.
- Iceland - traverses the border between the North American and the Eurasian continental plates, politically and culturally associated with Europe.

== In the Great Belt and the Sound (Øresund/Öresund) ==
- Danish islands:

- Funen
- Peberholm
- Sprogø
- Zealand

== In the Baltic Sea ==
- Major Danish islands:

- Bornholm
- Falster
- Lolland

- Major Estonian islands:

- Abruka
- Hiiumaa
- Kihnu
- Muhumaa
- Naissaar
- Osmussaar
- Piirissaar
- Ruhnu
- Saaremaa
- Vilsandi
- Vormsi

- Major Swedish islands:

- Gotland
- Öland
- Värmdö

- Major Finnish islands:

- Åland
- Hailuoto

- Major German islands:

- Fehmarn
- Rügen
- Usedom/Uznam (Germany and Poland)

- Major Polish islands:

- Aestian Island (artificial island in the Vistula Lagoon)
- Usedom/Uznam (Germany and Poland)
- Wolin

- Major Russian islands:

- Beryozovye Islands

== In the North Sea ==
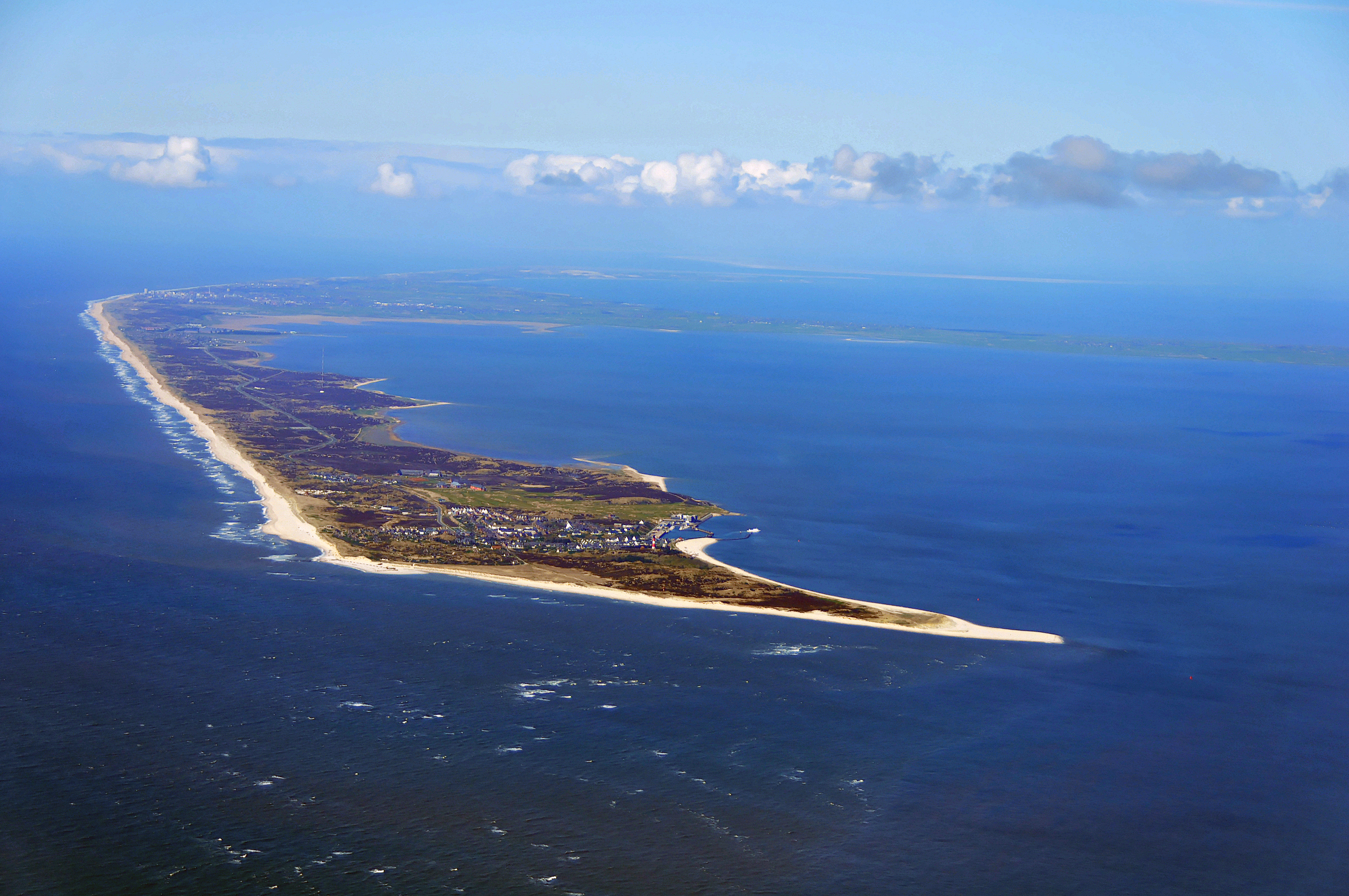
North Frisian Islands in Germany

- German and Dutch islands:
  - Frisian Islands
- Danish Wadden Sea Islands
- North Jutlandic Island

== In the Mediterranean Sea ==
- Western Mediterranean:
  - Balearic Islands (Spain)
  - Islas Chafarinas (Spain; plazas de soberanía)
  - Islas Alhucemas (Spain; plazas de soberanía)
  - Comino (Malta)
  - Cominotto (Malta)
  - Corsica (France)
  - Elba (Italy)
  - Fungus Rock (Malta)
  - Gozo (Malta)
  - Filfla (Malta)
  - Ischia (Italy)
  - Lampedusa (Italy; geographically African)
  - Lampione (Italy)
  - Linosa (Italy)
  - Malta (Malta)
  - Manoel Island (Malta)
  - Pantelleria (Italy)
  - Ponza (Italy)
  - Sardinia (Italy)
  - Sicily (Italy)
  - St. Paul's Islands (Malta)
- Southern Mediterranean:
  - Crete (Greece)
  - Euboea (Greece)
  - Lesbos Island (Greece)
  - Rhodes (Greece)
  - Chios (Greece)
  - Cyclades (Greece)
  - Dodecanese (Greece)
  - Sporades (Greece)
  - Northeastern Aegean Islands (Greece and Turkey)
  - Argo-Saronic Islands (Greece)
  - Ionian Islands (Greece)
  - Sazan (Albania)
  - Sveti Nikola Island (Montenegro)
  - Brač (Croatia)
  - Cres (Croatia)
  - Čiovo (Croatia)
  - Dugi Otok (Croatia)
  - Hvar (Croatia)
  - Iž (Croatia)
  - Korčula (Croatia)
  - Krk (Croatia)
  - Lastovo (Croatia)
  - Lošinj (Croatia)
  - Mljet (Croatia)
  - Molat (Croatia)
  - Murter (Croatia)
  - Pag (Croatia)
  - Pašman (Croatia)
  - Rab (Croatia)
  - Šolta (Croatia)
  - Ugljan (Croatia)
  - Vir (Croatia)
  - Cyprus (Cyprus; geographically Asian)

The rest of Greek Islands, Cyprus and Croatia are also part of Southern Mediterranean.

== In the Black Sea ==
- Bulgarian islands are parts of Eastern Mediterranean.
  - St. Anastasia Island
  - St. Cyricus Island
  - St. Ivan Island
  - St. Thomas Island
- Romanian islands
  - Sacalinu Mare Island
  - Sacalinu Mic Island
- Turkish islands, between Europe And Asia
  - Amasra Tavşan Adası
  - Büyükada (Amasra)
  - Giresun Island
  - Hoynat Islet
  - Kefken Island
  - Öreke
- Ukrainian islands
  - Snake Island

== In the Arctic Ocean ==
- Norwegian islands:
  - Jan Mayen
- Svalbard (territory of Norway):
  - Bear Island
  - Spitzbergen
  - Nordaustlandet
- Russian islands:
  - Bolshevik Island
  - Franz Josef Land
  - Komsomolets Island
  - Novaya Zemlya
  - October Revolution Island
  - Pioneer Island
  - Schmidt Island
  - Severnaya Zemlya

== In the Norwegian Sea ==
- Norwegian islands
  - Senja
  - Hitra
  - Lofoten
  - Sørøya

== Islands in lakes ==
- Islands in Italy:
  - San Giulio island Orta lake
  - Isola Bellad Maggiore lake
  - Isola Madred Maggiore lake
  - Isola dei Pescatorid Maggiore lake
- Islands in North Macedonia:
  - Golem Grad Island Prespa Lake

== Islands in rivers ==
- Kundziņsala, Daugava River, Latvia
- Tiber Island, Italy
- Île de la Cité, Paris, France
- Margaret Island, Budapest, Hungary

== See also ==
- List of European islands by area
- List of European islands by population
- List of islands in the Danube
- Islands in the River Thames, England, United Kingdom
