= List of islands of Mayotte =

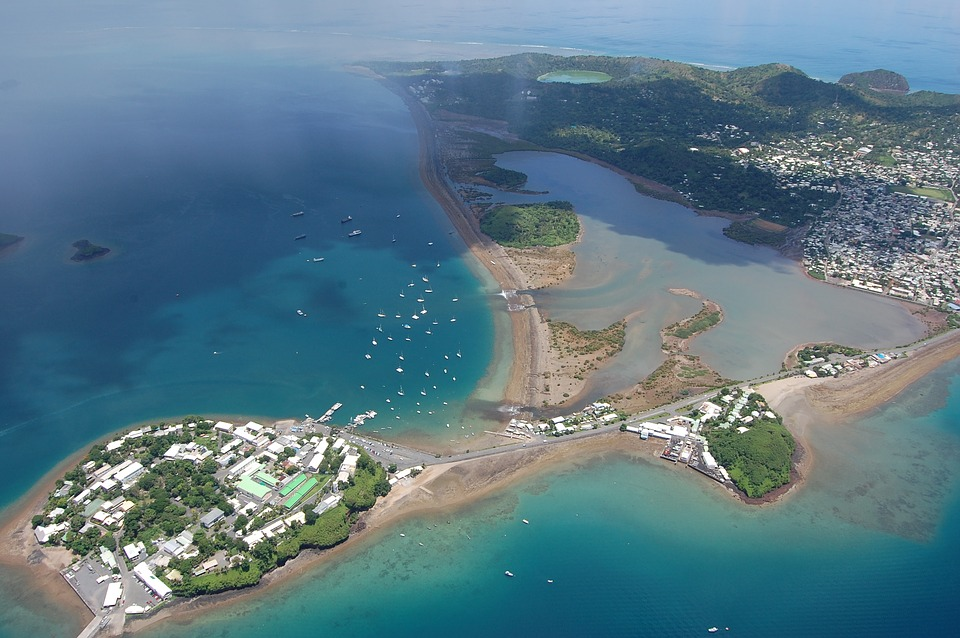
Sky view of Dzaoudzi, along with a part of Pamandzi.

The following is a list of islands of Mayotte:

== Table of islands ==
Island	Capital	Other cities	Area (km^{2})	Population
Mayotte Islands	Mamoudzou	Dzaoudzi, Tsingoni, Sada,	374.0	212700
Grand-Terre	Mamoudzou	Combani, Koungou, Majicavo-Koropa, Passamainty, Sada,	360.0	185680
Chissioua Mbouzi	Mbouzi		0.84	0
Chissioua Mtsamboro	Mtsamboro		2.0	20
Other Islands	Chissioua Bandrele		0.21	0
Pamandzi	Dzaoudzi	Labattoir, Pamandzi,	10.95	27000
Mayotte	Mamoudzou	Dzaoudzi, Tsingoni, Sada,	374.0	212700

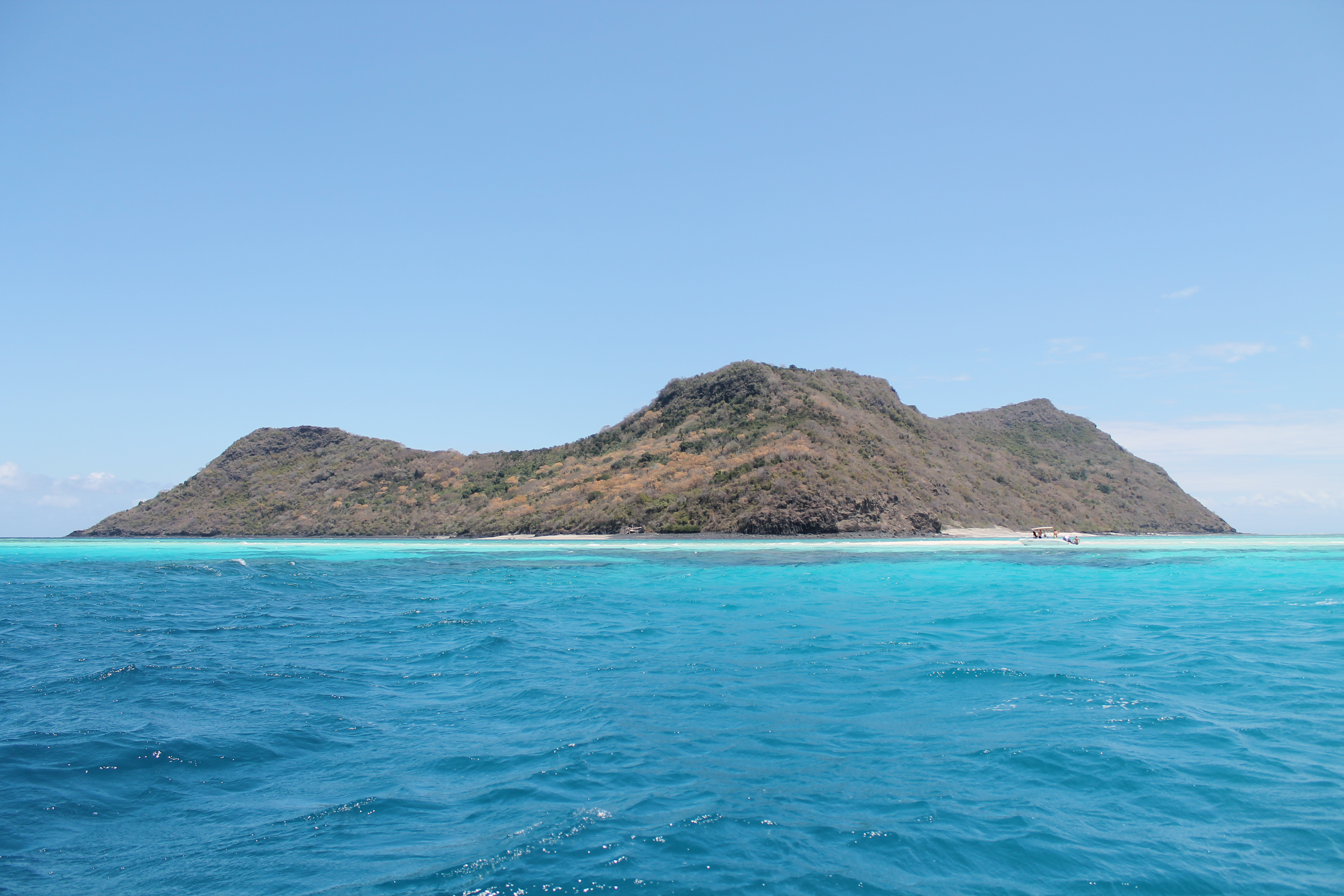
Chissioua Mtsamboro

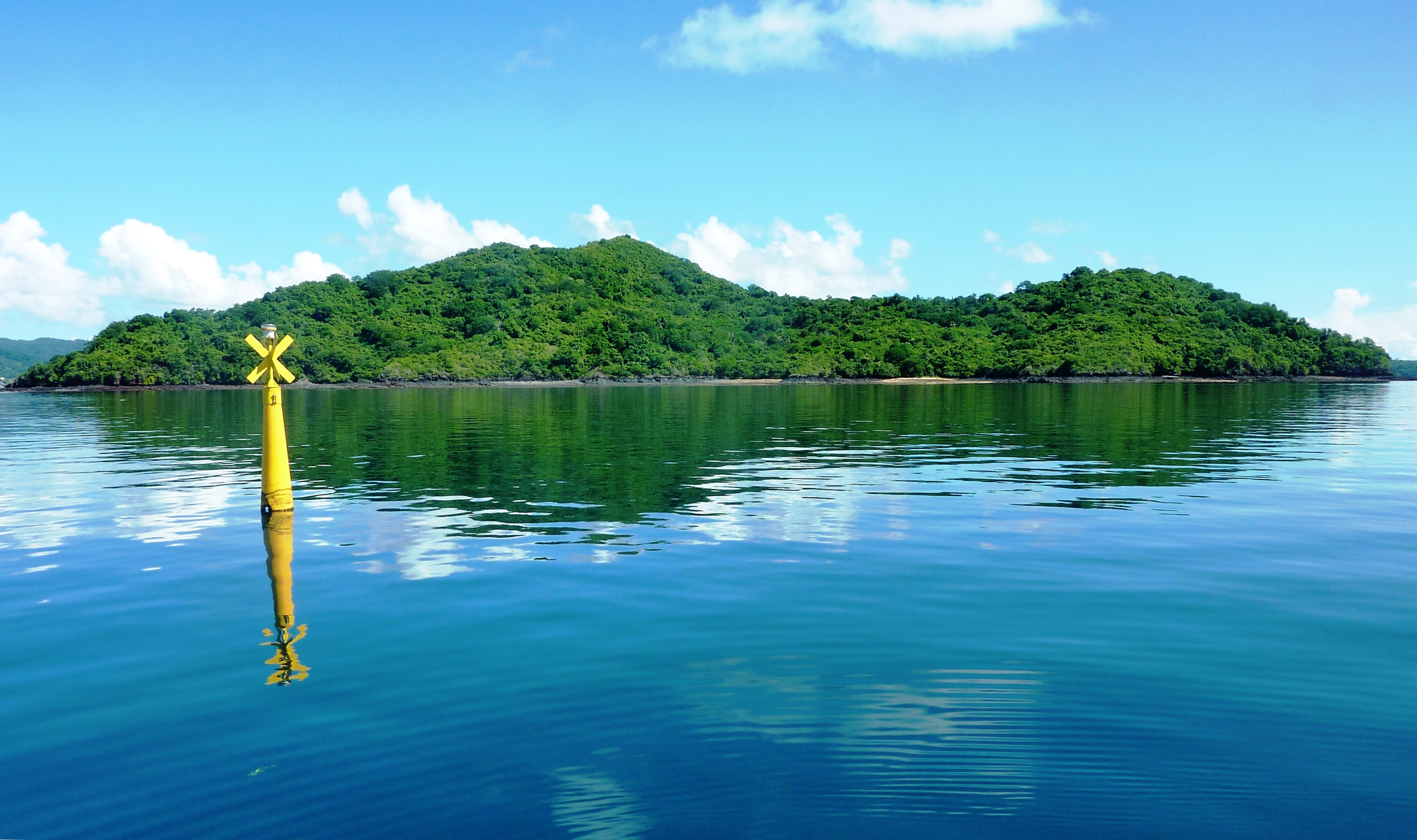
Chissioua Mbouzi

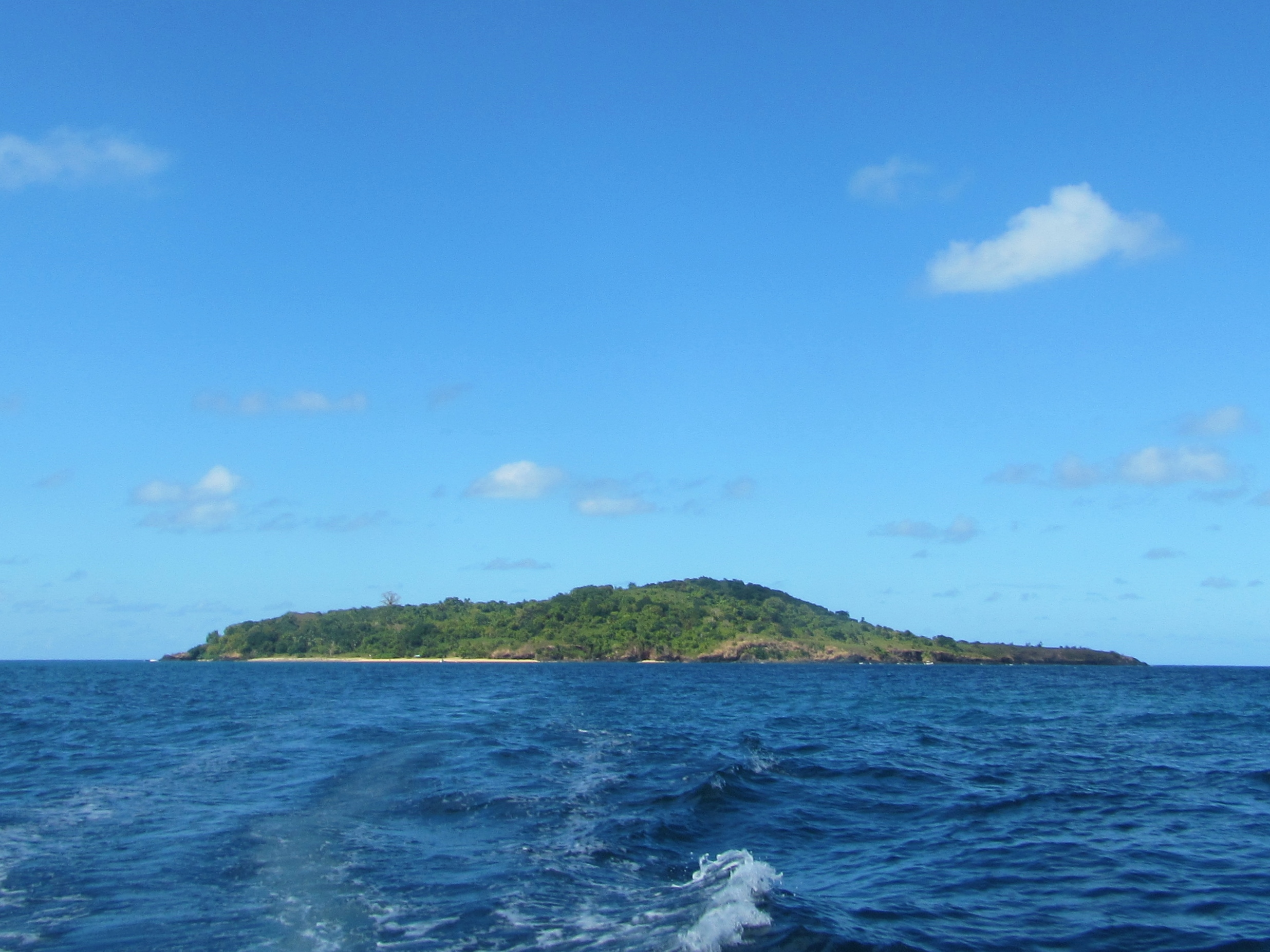
Chissioua Bandrele

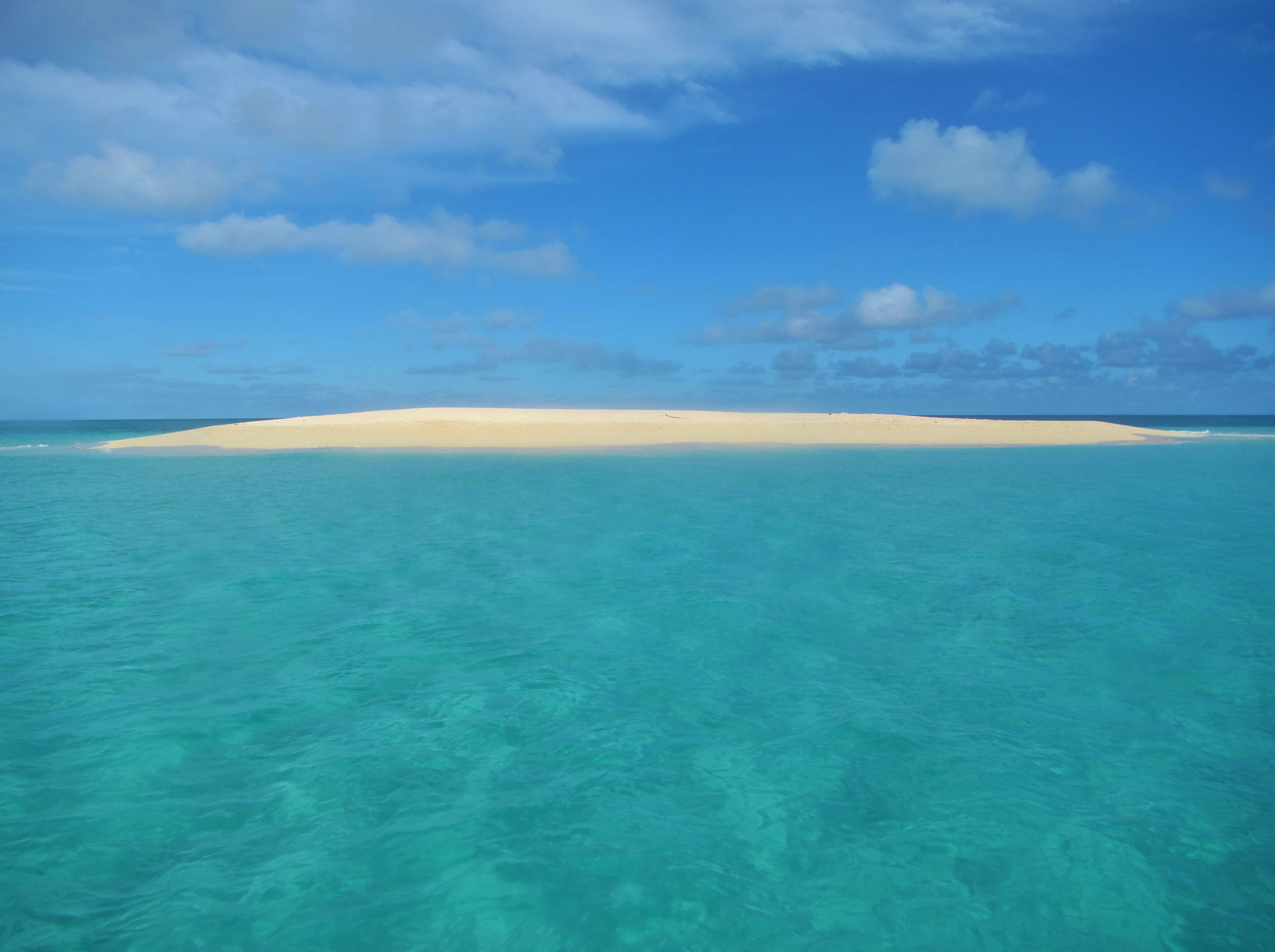
Îlot de Sable Blanc

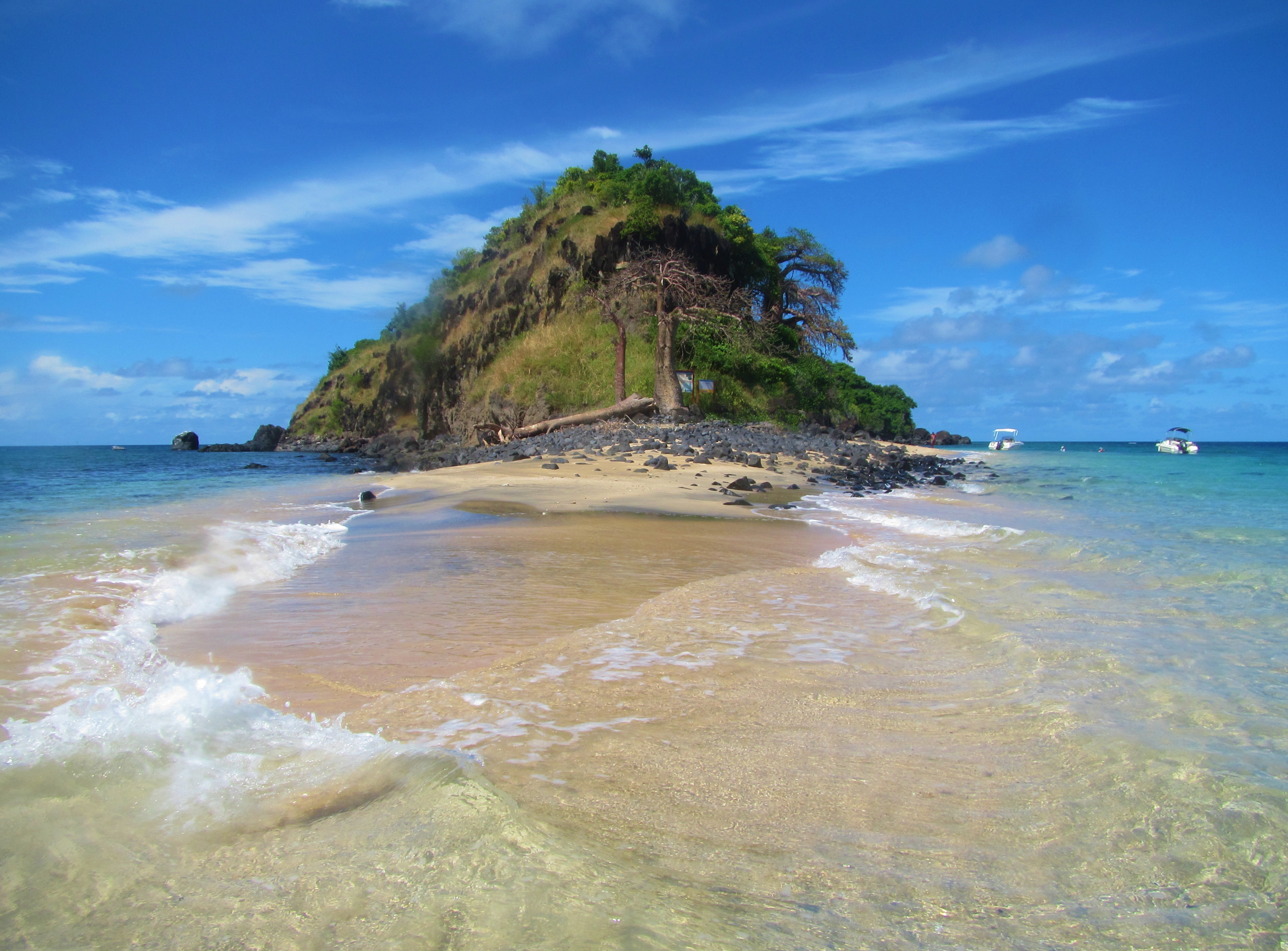
Chissioua Bambo

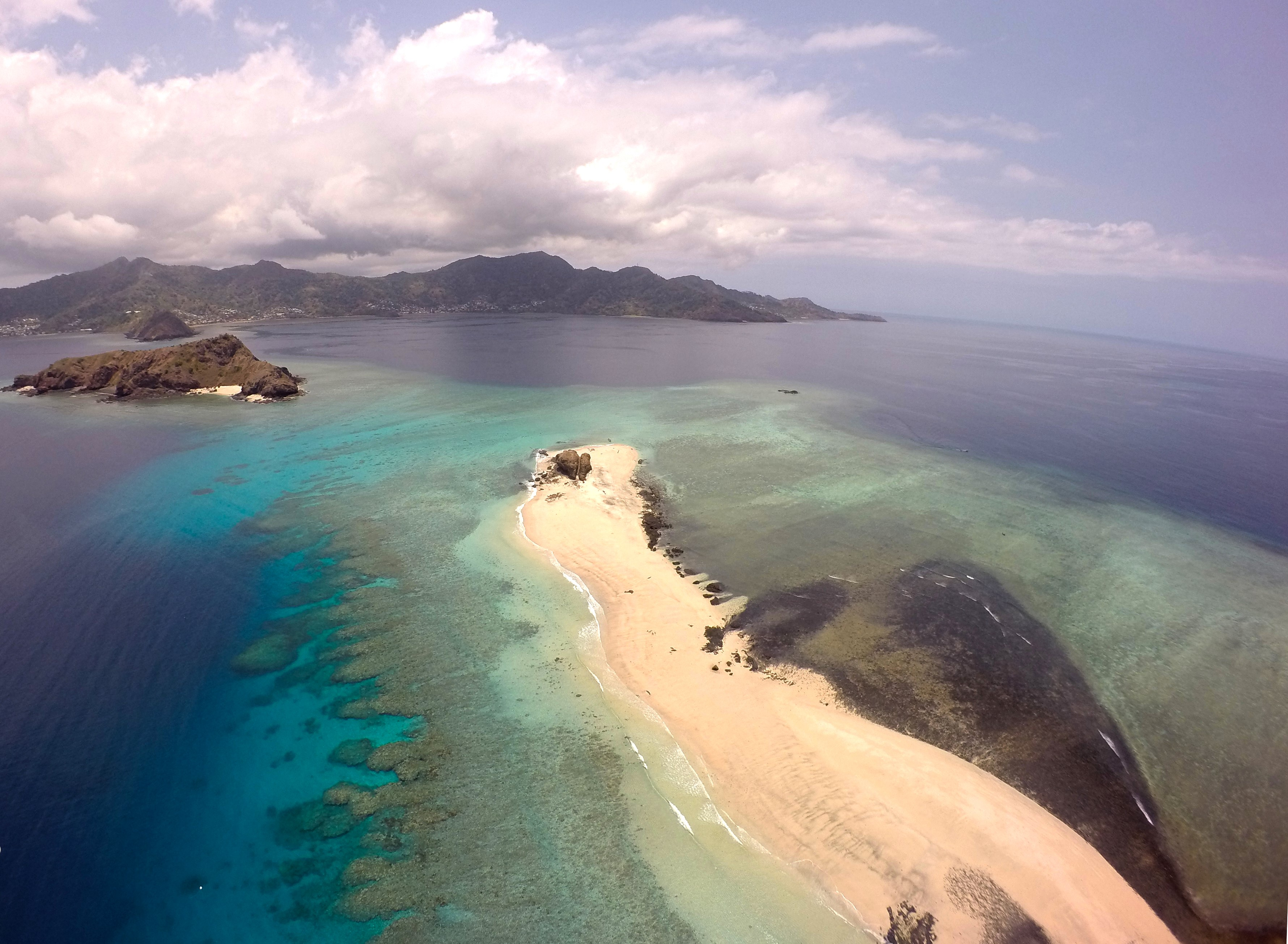
Choazil Islands.

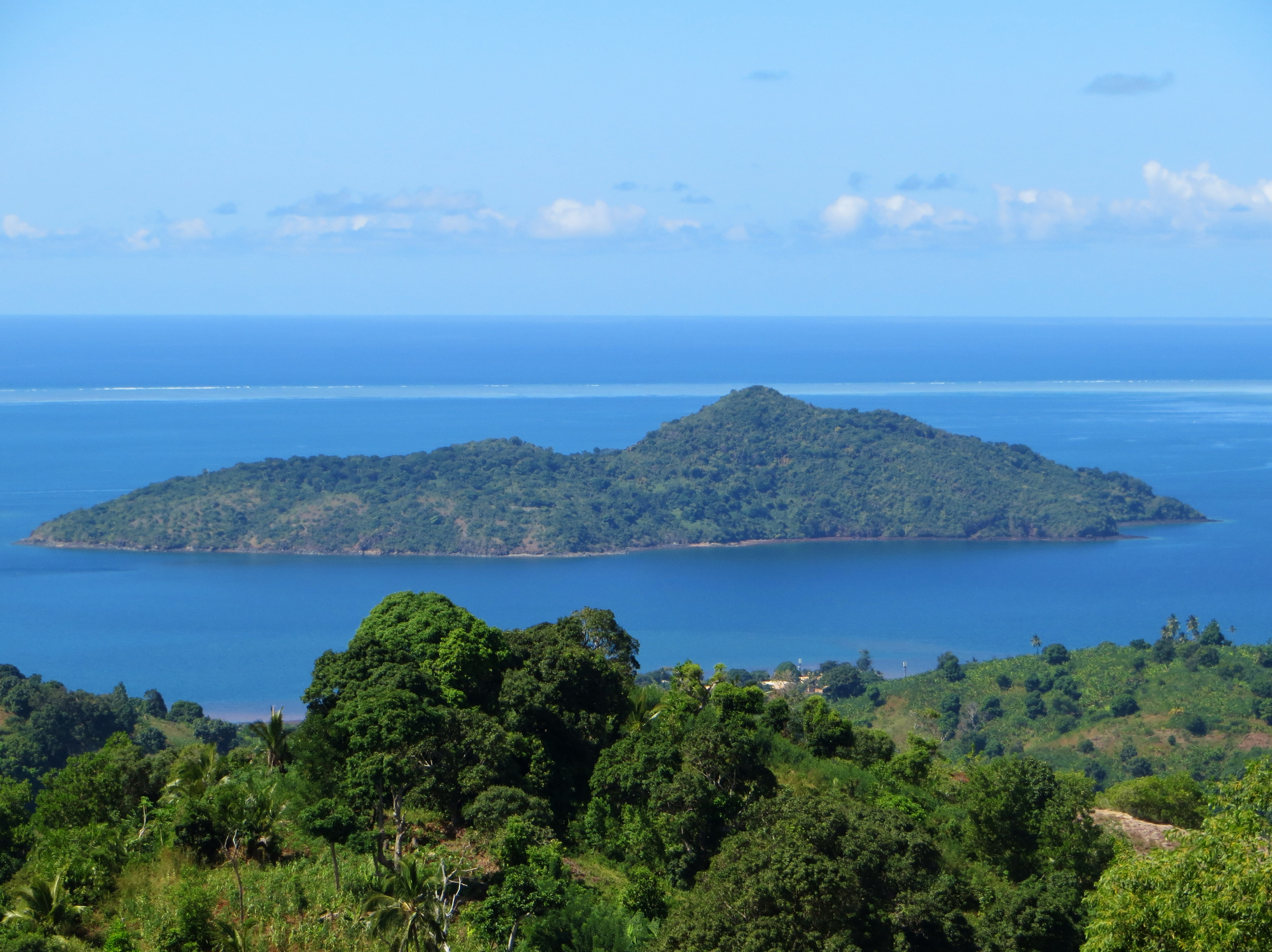
Chissioua Mbouzi seen from Grande Terre.

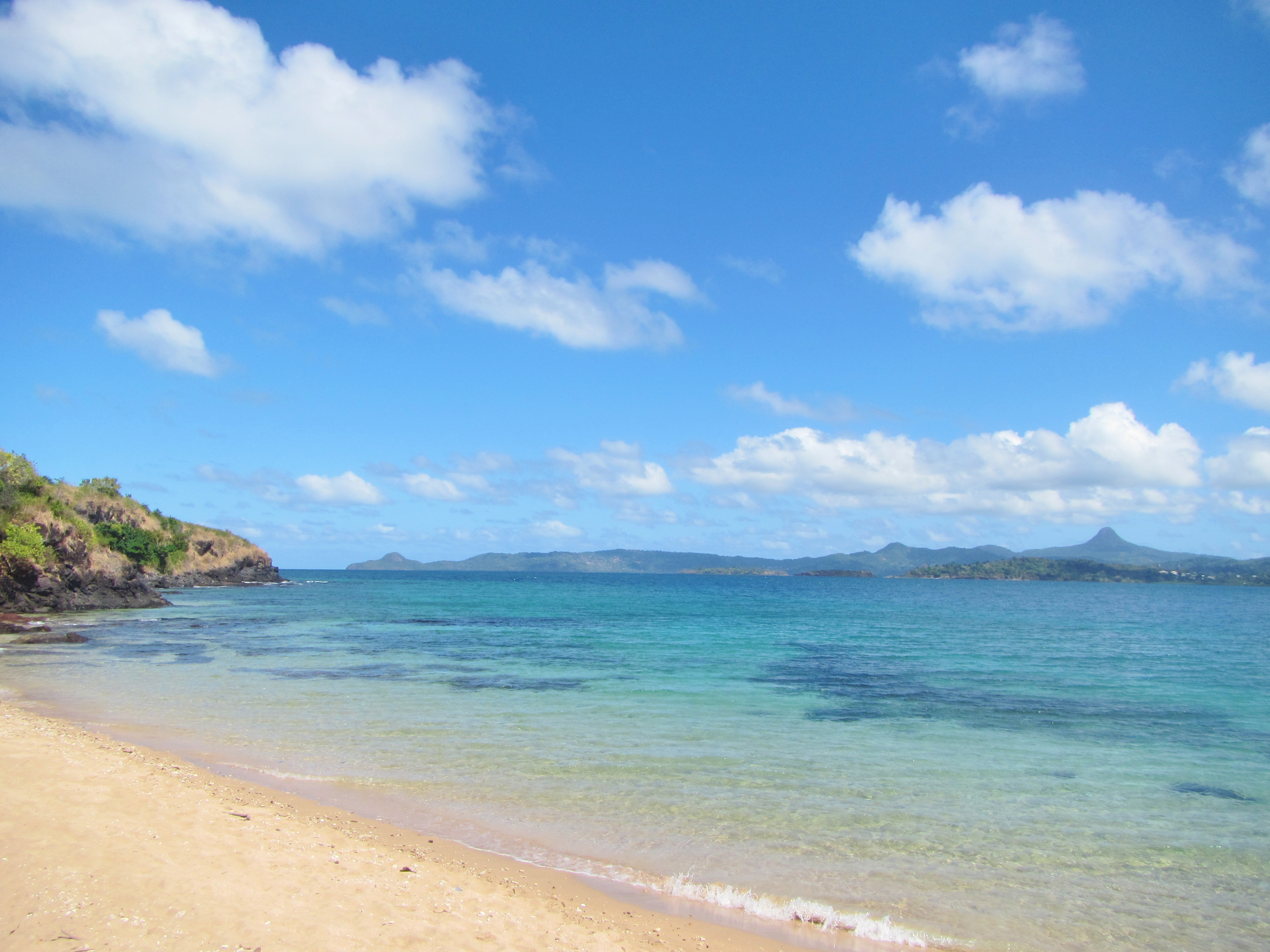
Southward view from Chissioua Bandrélé.

Other Islands:

- Chissioua Handrema
- Chissioua Karoni
- Chissioua Kolo Issa
- Chissioua Mbouini
- Chissioua Mtiti
- Chissioua Mtsongoma
- Chissioua Pengoua
- Chissioua Pouhou
- Chissioua Sada
- Ile Andrema
- Ile Blanche
- Ile Kakazou
- Ile Mogte Amiri
- Ile Vatou
- Île Verte (Mayotte)
- Choazil Islands
- Iles Hajangoua
- Ilot De Sable Blanc
- Les Quatre Freres

== See also ==
- Communes of Mayotte
- List of cities in Mayotte
