= Perşembe (disambiguation) =

Perşembe (Turkish for "Thursday") is a town and district of Ordu Province on the Black Sea coast of Turkey.

Perşembe may also refer to several places:

- Perşembe, Zonguldak, a town in Çaycuma district of Zonguldak Province, Turkey
- Hoynat Islet, also called Perşembe Islet, a Turkish islet in the Black Sea
- Perşembe Plateau, a high meadow and tourist attractions in the area of Aybastı, Turkey
