= Oyster Island =

Oyster Island(s) may refer to:

== New Zealand ==
- Oyster Island, New Zealand, an island off Tāhunanui, South Island, New Zealand
- Oyster Island, an islet off Great Barrier Island in the outer Hauraki Gulf, North Island, New Zealand

== United States ==
- Oyster Island (New Jersey), a peninsula formerly called Oyster Island, now Bergen Neck, in New Jersey
  - Oesters Eylandt, meaning "Oyster Island", a former name of the historical municipality of Bergen, New Netherland, in New Jersey
- Oyster Island (New York Harbor), former name of Ellis Island and two other islands in New York Harbor
- Oyster Island (Washington), a small island at the mouth of the Cedar River in Washington state

== Other places ==
- Oyster Island (Hampshire), a small island of archaeological significance in Langstone Harbour, Hampshire, England
- Oyster Island (Ireland), a long thin landmass at Rosses Point, at the entrance to Sligo Harbour, Ireland
- Oyster Island (Vanuatu), a small island off the island of Espiritu Santo in the Vanuatu archipelago
- Oyster Islands (Ukraine), see List of islands in the Black Sea

== See also ==
- Mayu Lighthouse, a lighthouse on Oyster Island in Myanmar, see List of lighthouses in Myanmar
- Oyster Rock, an island in Mumbai Harbour, Mumbai, India
- Oyster Rocks, part of the Tin Kettle Island Group, off Tasmania, Australia
- Oyster Rocks, Karachi, a small archipelago off the coast of the Clifton neighbourhood, Karachi, Pakistan
