= List of islands of Israel =

This is a list of islands of Israel, from North to South:

- Rosh HaNikra Islands
  - Shahaf
  - Nachlieli
  - Tchelet
- Achziv Islands
  - Achziv Island. Popular name in Israel is "Love Island". Legal to access.
  - Chegafyoun
  - Achziv Reef
- Hof Dor Islands, Dor
  - Shchafit
  - Dor
  - Tefet
  - Hofmi
- Yonim Island, Ma'agan Michael
- Caesarea Islands, Caesarea
- Mikhmoret Rock, Mikhmoret
- Andromeda Rock, Jaffa, Tel Aviv. Near the entrance of Jaffa Port.
- Adam Rock, Bat Yam.

== Lake islands ==
- Dead Tree Salt Island in the Ein Bokek basin of the Dead Sea
- Kinneret Island in the Sea of Galilee
