= Mtsamboro =

Commune in Mayotte, France

- Commune
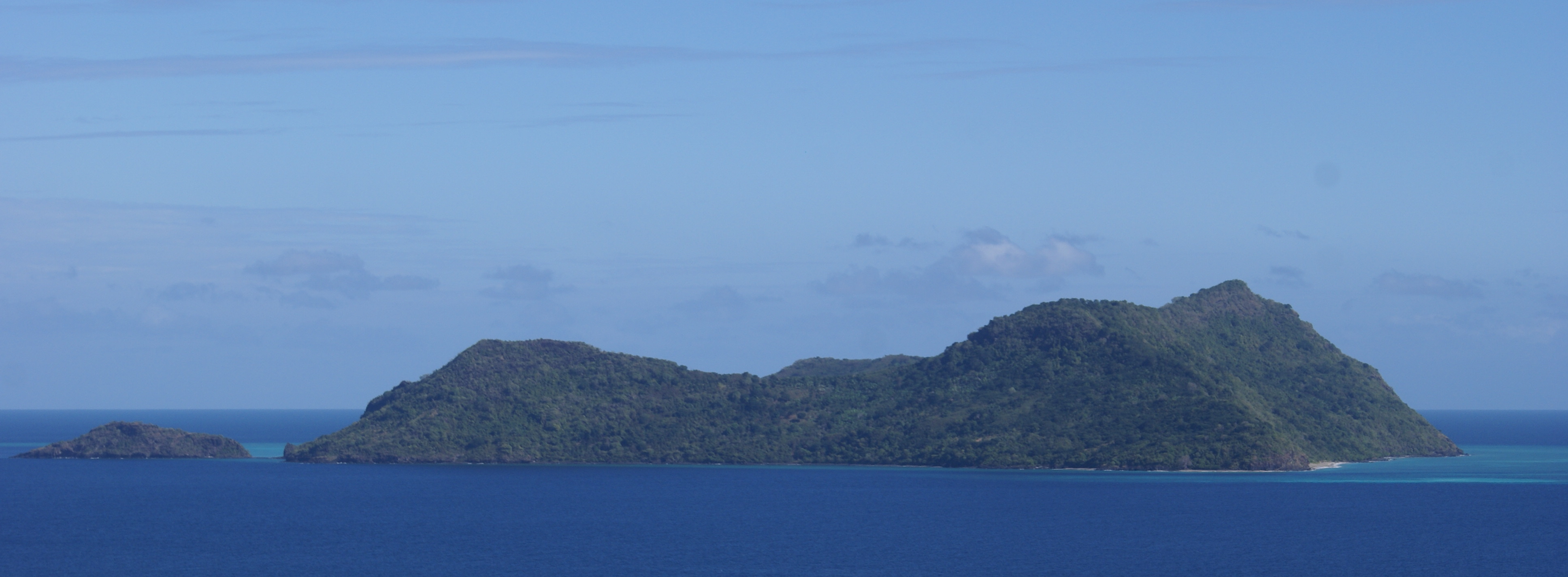
- Chissioua Mtsamboro

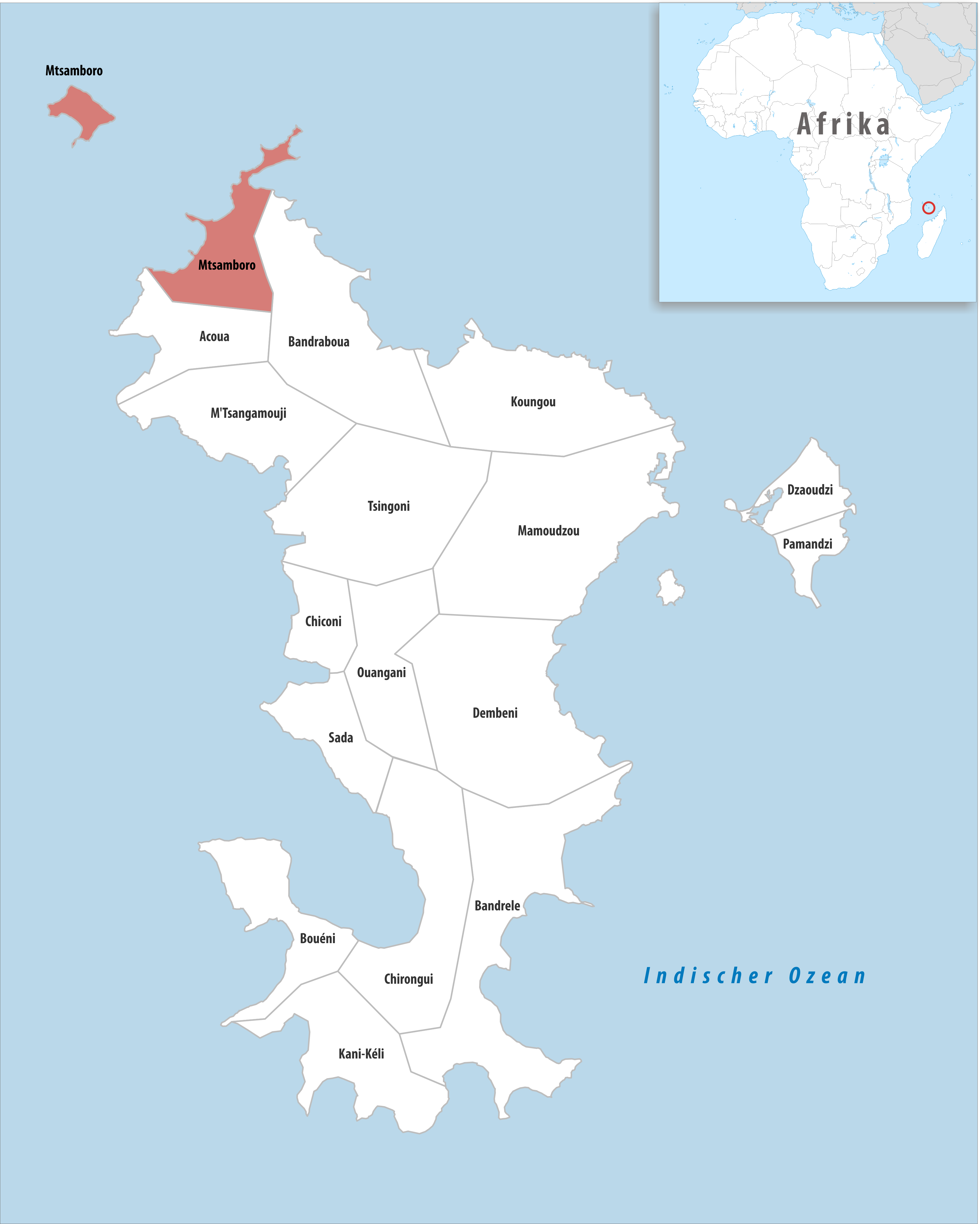
- Location of the commune (in red) within Mayotte
- Location of Mtsamboro
- Coordinates: 12°42′04″S 45°04′05″E
- Country: France
- Overseas region and department: Mayotte
- Canton: Mtsamboro
- Intercommunality: CA Grand Nord de Mayotte

Government
  - Mayor (2020–2026): Laïthidine Ben Saïd
- Area^{1}: 16.41 km^{2} (6.34 sq mi)
- Highest elevation: 480 m (1,570 ft)
- Lowest elevation: 0 m (0 ft)
- Population (2017): 7,705
  - Density: 469.5/km^{2} (1,216/sq mi)
- Time zone: UTC+03:00
- INSEE/Postal code: 97612 /97630
- ^{1} French Land Register data, which excludes lakes, ponds, glaciers > 1 km^{2} (0.386 sq mi or 247 acres) and river estuaries.

Mtsamboro (French pronunciation: [mtsɑ̃bɔʁo]) is a small fishing town and commune in northwest Mayotte, a French overseas department in the Indian Ocean. Its population according to the 2017 census is 7,705. Included in the commune are the Choazil Islands and Chissioua Mtsamboro. The main economic activity is fishing and orange production.

== History ==
Archaeology has revealed an occupation existed in thirteenth and fourteenth centuries on the Jiva beach named Mshambara, and traces of a medina dating from the fifteenth to seventeenth centuries in the quartier of Mjikura. Mtsamboro has an important place in the history of Mayotte: this town was the first capital of the Shirazi Sultanate as it hosted the first Sultan of Mayotte at the end of the fifteenth century. Mtsamboro was the main commercial port of the island and was visited by many European vessels. The town, like many others in Mayotte, was ruined and abandoned in the eighteenth century. In Mjikura are the ruins of a royal palace and tombs, an important location for the Sultans of Mayotte.

== Geography ==
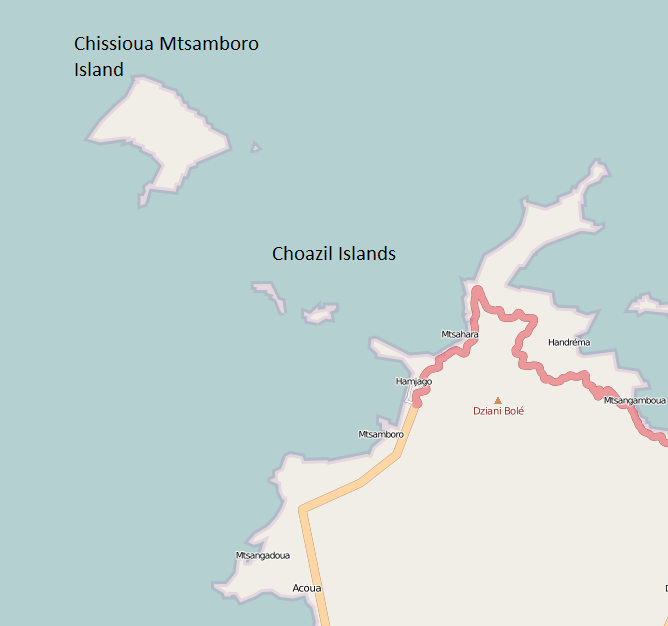
Map

The village of Mtsamboro lies on the northwest coast of the island along National Road 1. To the northeast is the village of Mtsahara and to the southwest is Mtsangadoua. Two small peninsulas jut out in the village area, the larger of which lies roughly a mile north of the village centre and separates the main village of Mtsamboro and Hamjago from Mtsahara. The larger peninsula is also the nearest point of land to Choazil Island, which with another form the Choazil Islands. This stretch of water is known as the Choazil Passage, part of the Mozambique Channel. North of the Choazil Islands is the larger Chissioua Mtsamboro (widely known as Zamburu Island); both islands are under the administration of the commune of Mtsamboro. Chissiou Mtsamboro is separated from the Choazil Islands by the Zamburu Passage. Chissiou Mtsamboro is a mountainous island, providing shelter to the main stretch of beach, tucked away in the southwest of the island which contains a main settlement and numerous huts dotted along the beach. The area to the southeast is heavily forested and forms part of the Reserve Forestiere Des Cretes Du Nord. To the east is a mountain called Dziani Bole, with an altitude of 472 metres.

=== Climate ===
Mtsamboro has a tropical savanna climate (Köppen climate classification Aw). The average annual temperature in Mtsamboro is 27.1 °C (80.8 °F). The average annual rainfall is 1,435.4 mm (56.51 in) with January as the wettest month. The temperatures are highest on average in April, at around 28.3 °C (82.9 °F), and lowest in August, at around 25.6 °C (78.1 °F). The highest temperature ever recorded in Mtsamboro was 35.3 °C (95.5 °F) on 12 April 2020; the coldest temperature ever recorded was 15.0 °C (59.0 °F) on 9 September 2000.

Climate data for Mtsamboro (1991–2020 averages, extremes 1991−present)
Month	Jan	Feb	Mar	Apr	May	Jun	Jul	Aug	Sep	Oct	Nov	Dec	Year
Record high °C (°F)	34.7 (94.5)	35.2 (95.4)	35.2 (95.4)	35.3 (95.5)	35.0 (95.0)	34.0 (93.2)	33.7 (92.7)	33.4 (92.1)	33.8 (92.8)	33.9 (93.0)	33.6 (92.5)	35.1 (95.2)	35.3 (95.5)
Mean daily maximum °C (°F)	31.3 (88.3)	31.6 (88.9)	32.1 (89.8)	32.5 (90.5)	32.1 (89.8)	31.1 (88.0)	30.3 (86.5)	30.1 (86.2)	30.0 (86.0)	30.3 (86.5)	30.6 (87.1)	31.3 (88.3)	31.1 (88.0)
Daily mean °C (°F)	27.8 (82.0)	28.0 (82.4)	28.2 (82.8)	28.3 (82.9)	27.8 (82.0)	26.6 (79.9)	25.8 (78.4)	25.6 (78.1)	25.7 (78.3)	26.5 (79.7)	27.2 (81.0)	27.9 (82.2)	27.1 (80.8)
Mean daily minimum °C (°F)	24.2 (75.6)	24.4 (75.9)	24.3 (75.7)	24.1 (75.4)	23.5 (74.3)	22.1 (71.8)	21.3 (70.3)	21.0 (69.8)	21.4 (70.5)	22.7 (72.9)	23.8 (74.8)	24.5 (76.1)	23.1 (73.6)
Record low °C (°F)	22.0 (71.6)	20.0 (68.0)	21.0 (69.8)	21.0 (69.8)	16.5 (61.7)	17.5 (63.5)	15.5 (59.9)	16.0 (60.8)	15.0 (59.0)	19.0 (66.2)	21.4 (70.5)	21.0 (69.8)	15.0 (59.0)
Average precipitation mm (inches)	277.4 (10.92)	223.3 (8.79)	262.0 (10.31)	134.8 (5.31)	48.8 (1.92)	28.3 (1.11)	18.1 (0.71)	28.0 (1.10)	40.6 (1.60)	90.2 (3.55)	112.3 (4.42)	171.6 (6.76)	1,435.4 (56.51)
Average precipitation days (≥ 1.0 mm)	14.7	13.1	15.8	10.6	5.5	3.5	3.0	4.0	5.0	8.0	8.7	11.2	103.1
Mean monthly sunshine hours	145.9	139.2	167.6	173.6	175.8	169.6	—	—	—	—	—	—	—
Source 1: Météo-France
Source 2: Meteociel (sunshine 1981-2010)

== Economy ==
The economy is mainly based around agriculture and fishing; it is notable area for orange production.

== Notable landmarks ==
The main mosque is de Vendredi Mosque. It contains the Collège de M'tsamboro and Hôtel Mtsamboro. There are at least 3 small sports grounds, two of which lie in very close proximity to the larger peninsula, near Mtsahara.
