= Maribor Island =

River island in Slovenia

Maribor
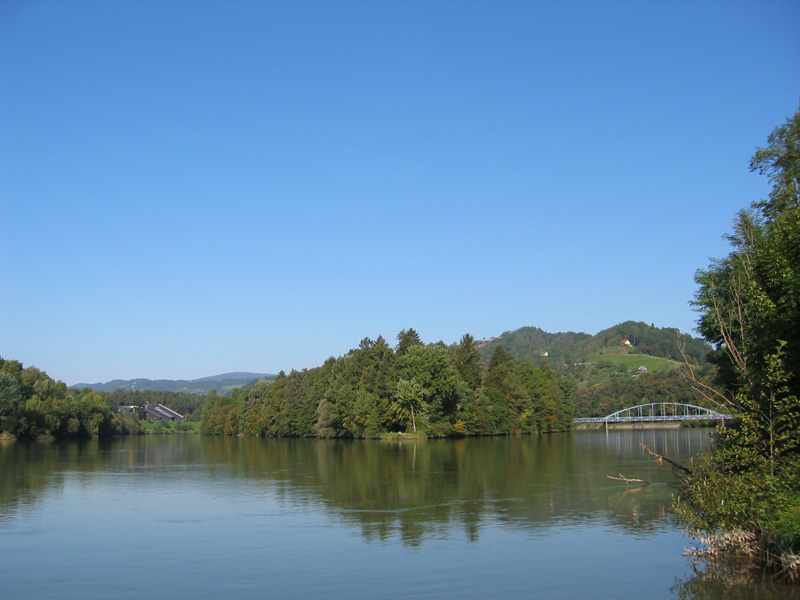
- Maribor Island

- Location within Slovenia

Geography
- Location: Drava River
- Coordinates: 46°34′02″N 15°36′42″E
- Area: 0.11 km^{2} (0.042 sq mi)

Administration
- Slovenia

Demographics
- Population: 0

The Maribor Island (Slovene: Mariborski otok) is the name of a natural island on the Drava river near the town of Maribor, in the region of Lower Styria (Spodnja Štajerska) of the European country of Slovenia. In 1951 it was protected as a natural heritage, and today it has the condition of natural geomorphological and botanical monument. At the same time it is an important habitat for animal species, especially birds. Access to the island is possible thanks to a picturesque path that leads along the left bank of the Drava past the bay of Koblarjev.

The formation of the island was due to natural circumstances such as the rapids on the Drava River, where the hydroelectric dam near Maribor Island. There are typical forest species such as birds, especially in winter, it becomes a refuge for waterfowl. Registered, there are 75 species, of which 31 species nest.

== See also ==
- List of islands of Slovenia
