= K Island =

Island in the Black Sea, disputed between Romania and Ukraine

Coordinates: 45°11′08″N 29°45′45″E

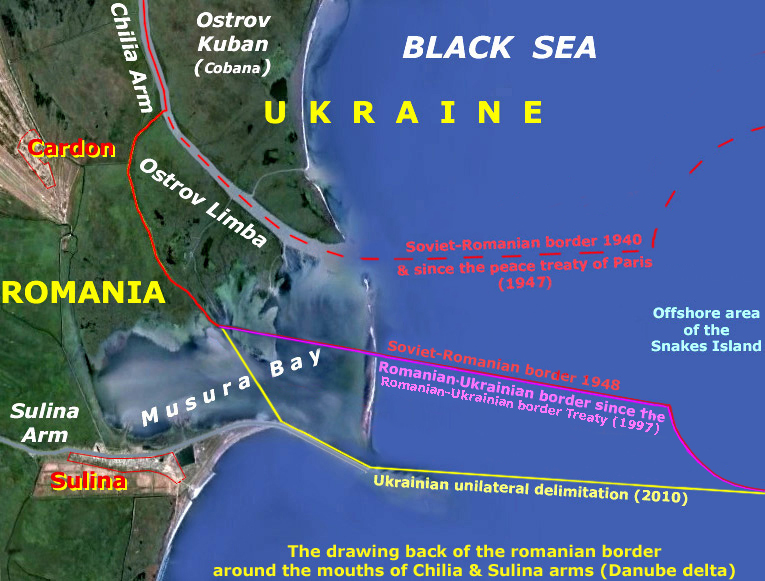
Musura Bay, Black Sea

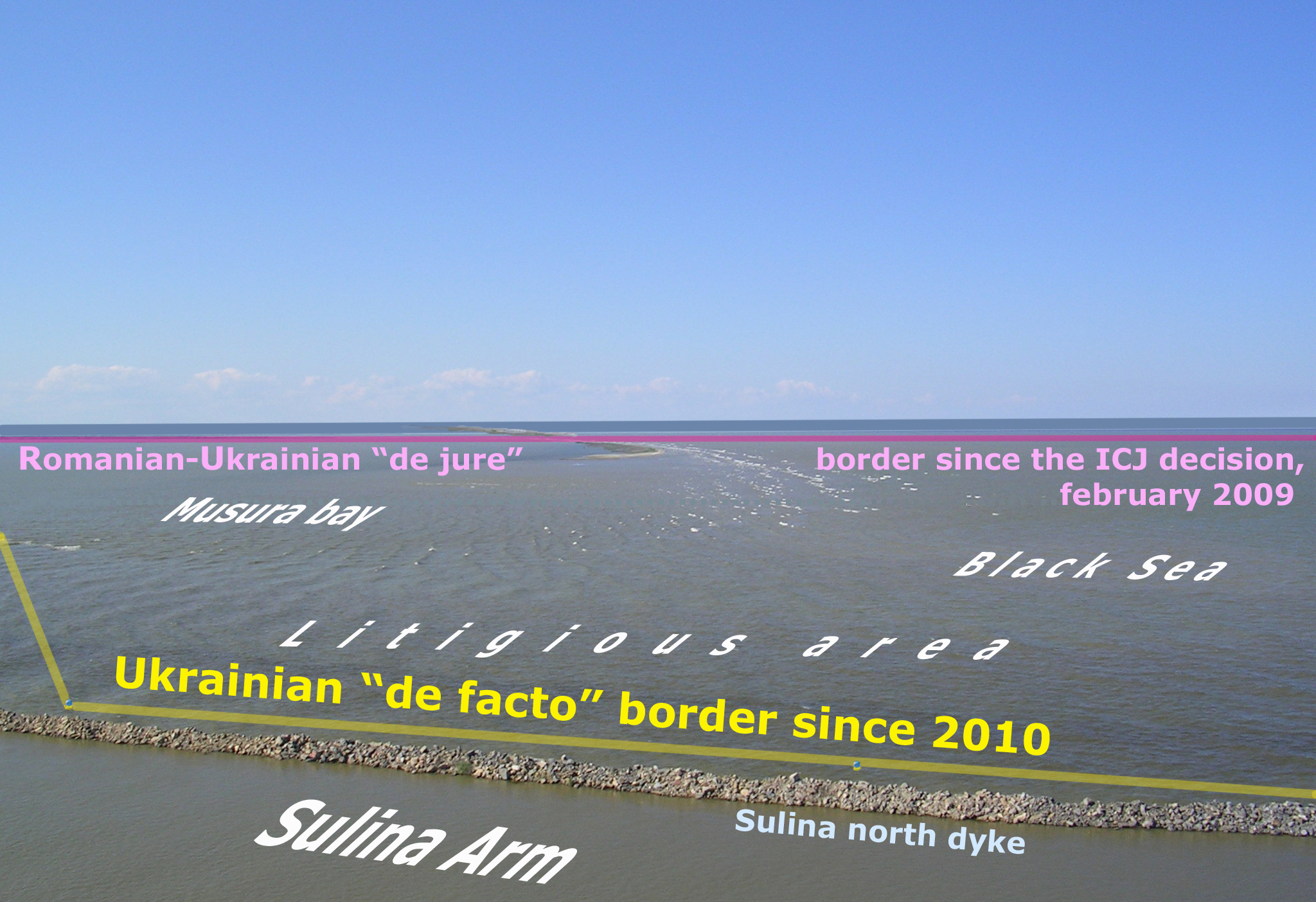
De jure & de facto borders between Ukraine & Romania, Musura Bay, Black Sea, 2011

The K or Nova Zemlia Island (Romanian: Insula K; Ukrainian: Острів Нова Земля, New Earh Island), sometimes referred to as the Island of Happiness (Romanian: Insula Fericirii), is a newly formed and uninhabited island in the Musura Bay where the Danube Delta meets the Black Sea. The island was a disputed territory until 2009 and is currently divided between Romania (40%) and Ukraine (60%).

== Geography ==
The island is 7 km (4.3 mi) long and 80 m (260 ft) wide, with an area of 560 ha. It started forming in the early 2000s and while it is predominantly made out of sand, in recent years forms of vegetation have appeared. K Island and Sacalin Island are Romania's newest territories and are continuing to grow. The island is especially popular for birdwatching, with many tourists taking day trips to the island.

== See also ==
- List of divided islands
- List of islands of Ukraine
