= Mtsahara =

Village in Mtsamboro, Mayotte

Coordinates: 12°40′52″S 45°5′1″E

Mtsahara is a village in the commune of Mtsamboro on Mayotte.
