= Hamjago =

- Village
- Location within Mayotte
- Coordinates: 12°41′9″S 45°4′19″E
- Country: France
- Overseas Territory: Mayotte
- Commune: Mtsamboro
- Time zone: UTC+3 (EAT)

Hamjago is a village in the commune of Mtsamboro on Mayotte. Most residents (93%) speak Kibushi, the local dialect of the Malagasy language.
