= Zamburu Passage =

Water passage in the Mozambique Channel near Mayotte

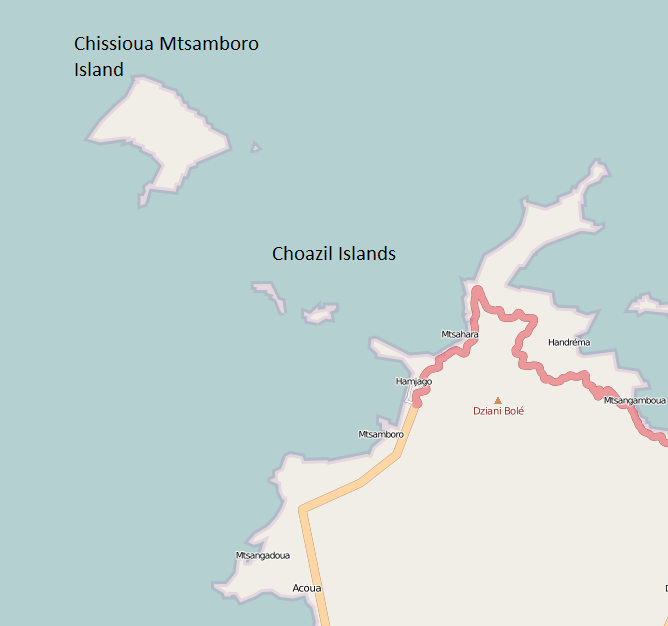

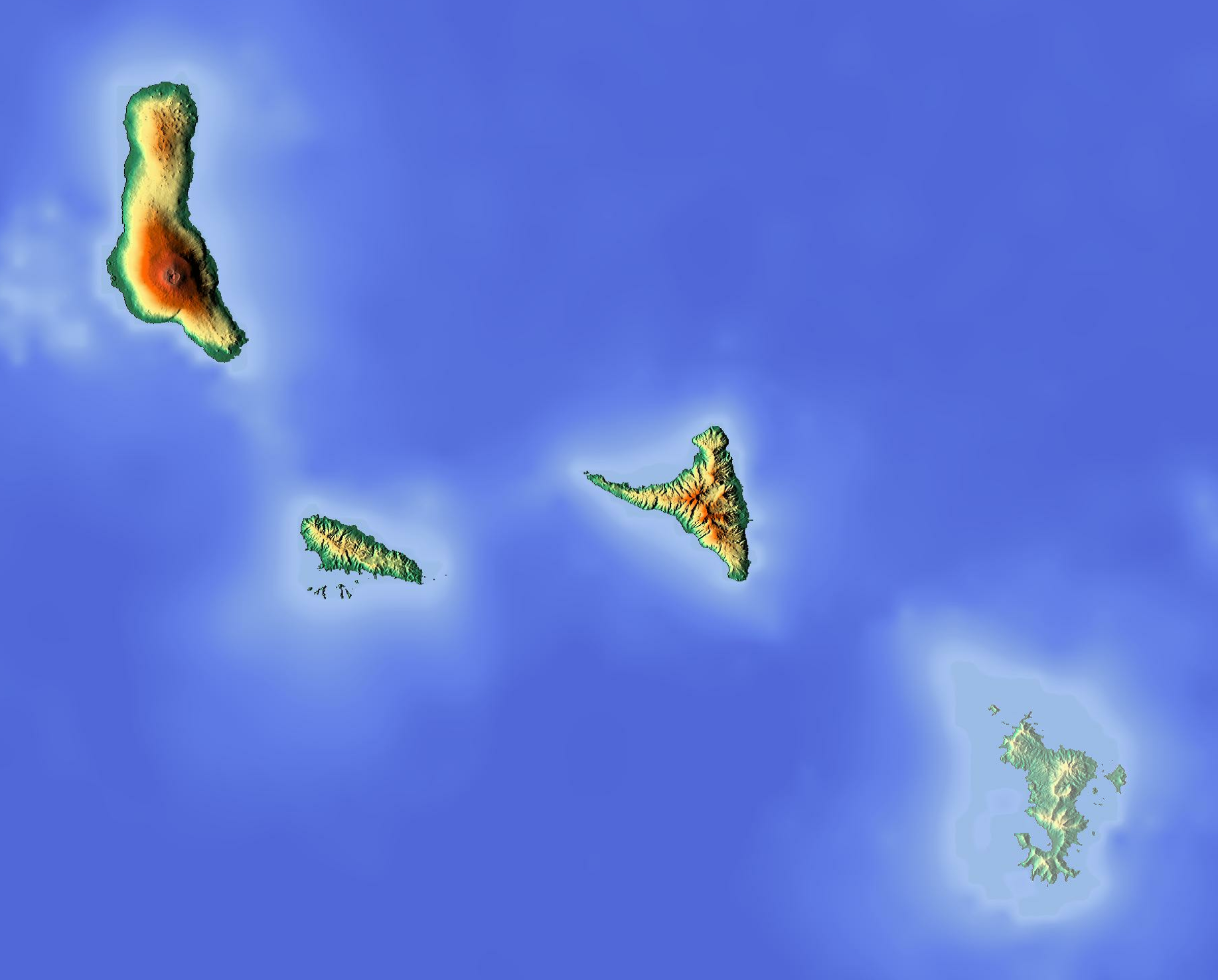
- Zamburu Passage in relation to Comoros
- Location: Mayotte
- Coordinates: 12°40′45.73″S 45°3′46.13″E
- Type: Passage
- Part of: Mozambique Channel
- Islands: Choazil Islands, Chissioua Mtsamboro

Zamburu Passage is a passage in the Mozambique Channel which separates the Choazil Islands from Chissioua Mtsamboro (Zamburu Island), 3 miles off the northwest coast of Mayotte.

The Seaman's Guide to the Navigation of the Indian Ocean and China Sea of 1867 said as follows:

Approaching Mayotta from the N.W., Zamburu cannot be mistaken; if approaching to the northward of the outlying shoal, keep Zamburu peak to the southward of S.E. 1/2 S., which will give the shoal a berth of over a mile. Bring and keep Cape Duamuni on with the second summit (the south-western peak) of Pamanzi S.E. 1/3 S., until Zamburu peak bears West, when run East from the latter until the next marks come on—viz., Point Congo on with the second summit of Pamanzi S.E. 3/4 S. Observe, however, that Point Congo is not the extreme of land ...; there is a point beyond it—ill defined on the chart—which a stranger is apt to mistake for Point Congo. The point which is the extreme land (Point Makaoen) must be made to overlap the second summit of Pamanzi as much as the second summit appears above it. This will take you in the fairway between the narrows, and continuing that course you will leave Prévoyante Shoal on your right hand (going in). When Morne hill comes on with Zamburu peak N.W. by W., steer from these last marks. You may then pass close to Aombé islet, which is steep-to on its west and south sides, and thence pursue a midchannel course into Pamanzi bay, or round to the anchorage south-west of Zaudzi. In rounding Zaudzi spit, do not haul to the southward until the four Nossi Effatsi islands open westward of Mognaméri.

Entering Zamburu passage with the leading mark on, when between Zamburu and North reef, there is a bank of 7 fathoms' soundings, apparently good anchoring ground. The French frigates Cordelière and Somme sounded on this bank; it is a mile in extent N. by E. and S. by W., lying right in the fairway with least water 4 1/2 fathoms; at its north and south extremes there are 6 1/2 fathoms; it may be dangerous in parts for vessels of heavy draught.
