= Choazil Passage =

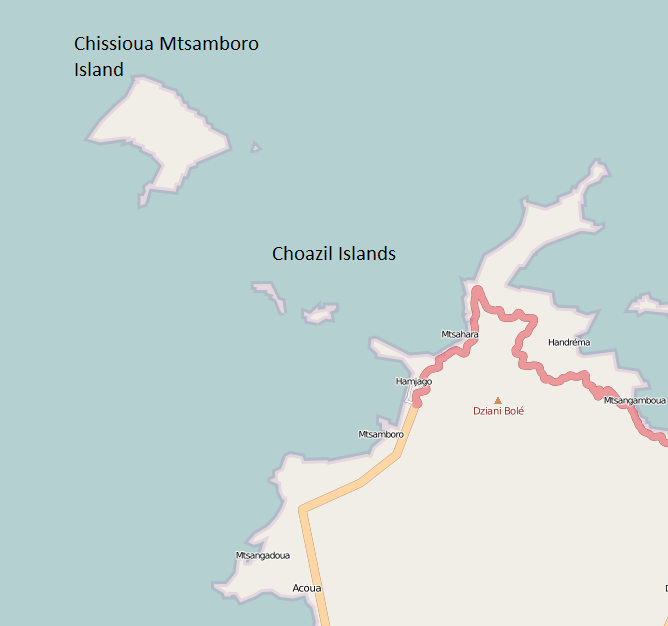
Map

Choazil Passage is a passage in the Mozambique Channel which separates the mainland of Mtsamboro in northwest Mayotte from the Choazil Islands. It is said to be 5.5 fathoms (33 ft; 10.1 m) deep mid channel.
