= List of islands of Slovenia =

Bled Island

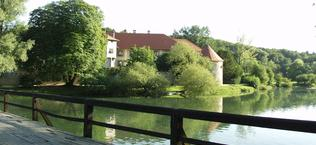
Otočec

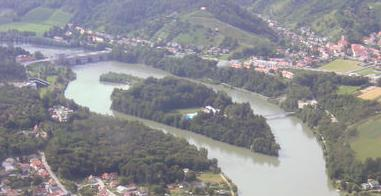
Maribor island

List of islands of Slovenia

== Sea islands ==
- An unnamed island in Lucija, part of the marina

== Former islands ==
- Koper
- Izola

== Lake islands ==
- Bled island
- An underground island in Cross Cave

== River islands ==
- Downtown Ljubljana is an artificial island surrounded by the Ljubljanica River and the Gruber Canal
- Kostanjevica na Krki
- Maribor Island
- Otočec

== List of islands ==
#	Island	Area(km²),(ha)	Coordinates	Location
1	Kostanjevica na Krki	0.115 (11.5 ha)	45°50′45″N 15°25′12″E	Krka (Sava)
2	Maribor Island	0.11 (11 ha)	46°34′00″N 15°36′41″E	Maribor
3	Otočec	0.025 (2.5 ha)	45°50′16″N 15°14′08″E	Krka (Sava)
4	Nameless island at Lucija	0.02 (2 ha)	45°30′15″N 13°35′40″E	Adriatic Sea
5	Bled Island	0.012 (1.2 ha)	46°21′43″N 14°05′24″E	Lake Bled
