= Andromeda's rock =

Rock in the Mediterranean Sea

Coordinates: 32.0562°N 34.7508°E

Andromeda Rock
- Rock formation
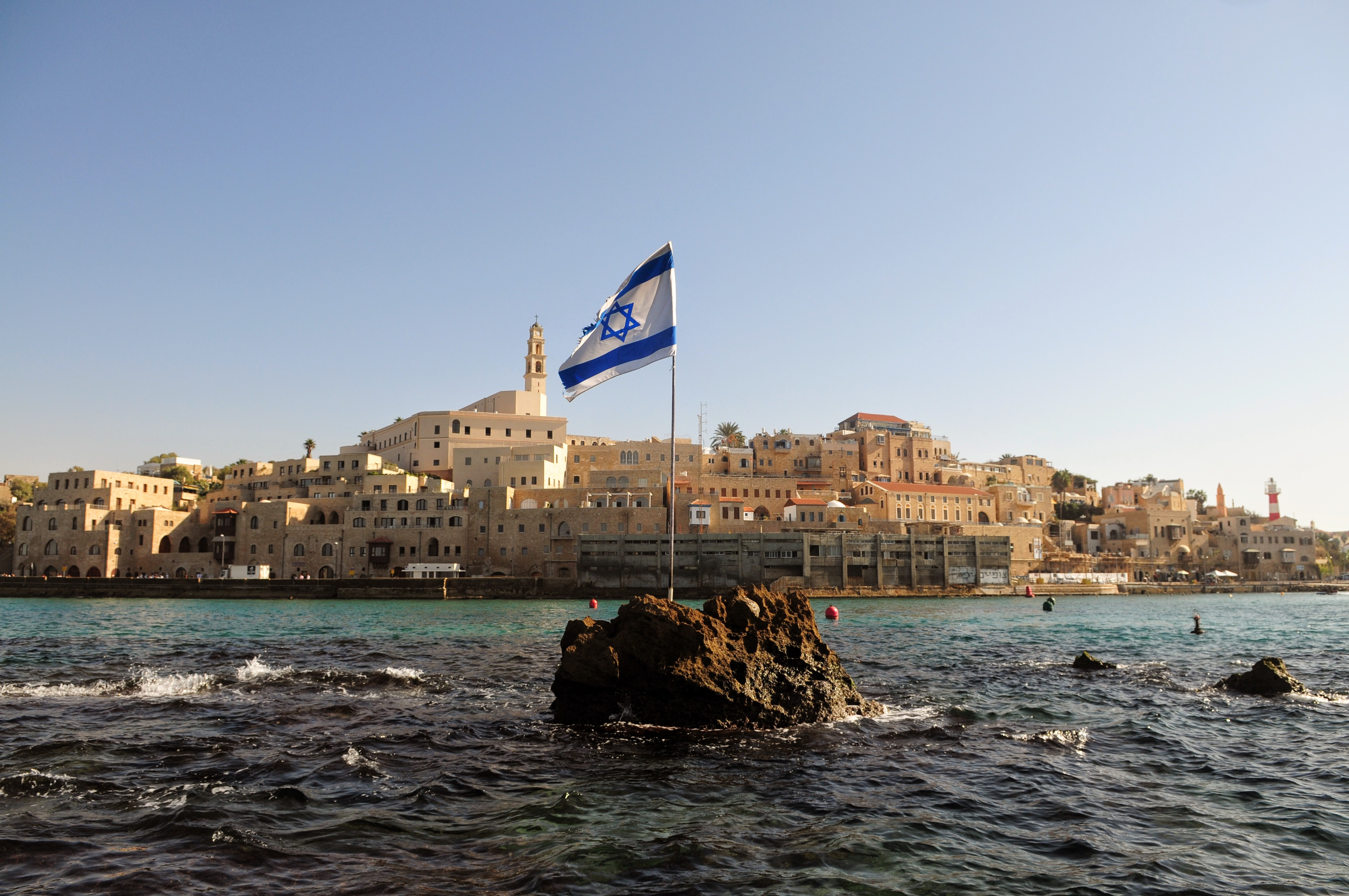
- Andromeda's rock in front of the old city of Jaffa

- Coordinates
- Location: Mediterranean Sea, off the coast of Jaffa, Israel
- Etymology: Named after Andromeda from Greek mythology

The Andromeda Rock is a rock jutting out of the Mediterranean in front of the old town of Jaffa, in Israel, where it serves as a local tourist attraction. According to Greek mythology, this was the site where King Cepheus's daughter Andromeda was chained and sacrificed to a sea monster, but was timely rescued by Perseus, who then married Andromeda.

== Story of name ==
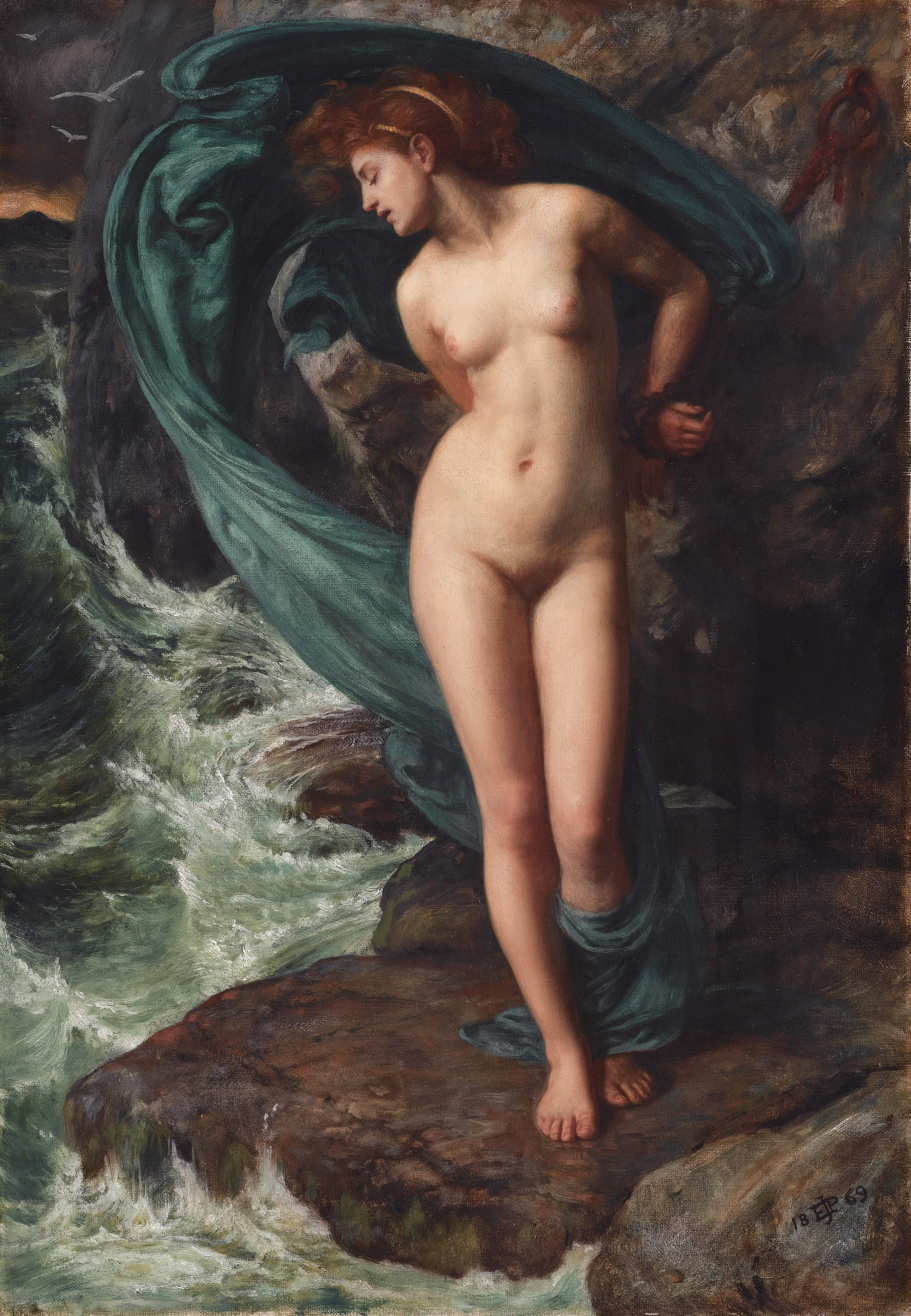
Edward Poynter's - Andromeda. 1869

The name Andromeda Rock originates from Greek mythology, which recounts that Andromeda was an Ethiopian princess whose mother, Cassiopeia, daughter of the wind god Aeolus, married the founder of the city Cepheus. When her mother boasted of her daughter's great beauty, she incurred the wrath of Poseidon, god of the sea, who believed his daughters were more beautiful than Andromeda. He stirred up waves that threatened to destroy the city, and to appease him, Andromeda was chained to a rock on the seashore and given as a sacrifice to the sea monster. The hero Perseus freed her from her chains and killed the sea monster that wanted to devour Andromeda using the head of Medusa, which turned anyone who looked at it into stone.

Ze'ev Vilnai in his book "Legends of the Land of Israel" describes this legend in another version, according to which a terrible fish lived in the sea opposite the shores of Jaffa that sank ships and killed many sailors, and its wrath was only appeased if the most beautiful of Jaffa's daughters was sacrificed to it each year. One year Andromeda was chosen as the annual sacrifice and chained in iron chains to the rock on the beach. As the fish approached to swallow her, her lover Perseus appeared, riding a winged horse, killed the fish with his sword and saved Andromeda.

Pliny the Elder, from the 1st century BCE, tells of the rib of the fish, named Cetus, which was 40 feet long and was brought to Rome, and of the city of Jaffa, saying And in front of it is found a rock which shows marks made by the chains with which Andromeda was bound to it. In Jaffa the cult of the mythical goddess called Cetus was widespread.

Another ancient legend states that Japheth son of Noah son of Noah built the city of Jaffa even before the Flood, and that Noah's grave is under the rock that is within the sea of Jaffa. Professor Nahum Slouschz wrote:

"A legend... according to which the city of Jaffa was built by the three sons of Noah who dwelt there. And on one of the rocks found about a parasang [ancient Persian unit of length] within the sea Noah their father is buried underneath a rock to which the Greek myth's giant Andromedus chained [Andromeda]...".

== Gallery ==
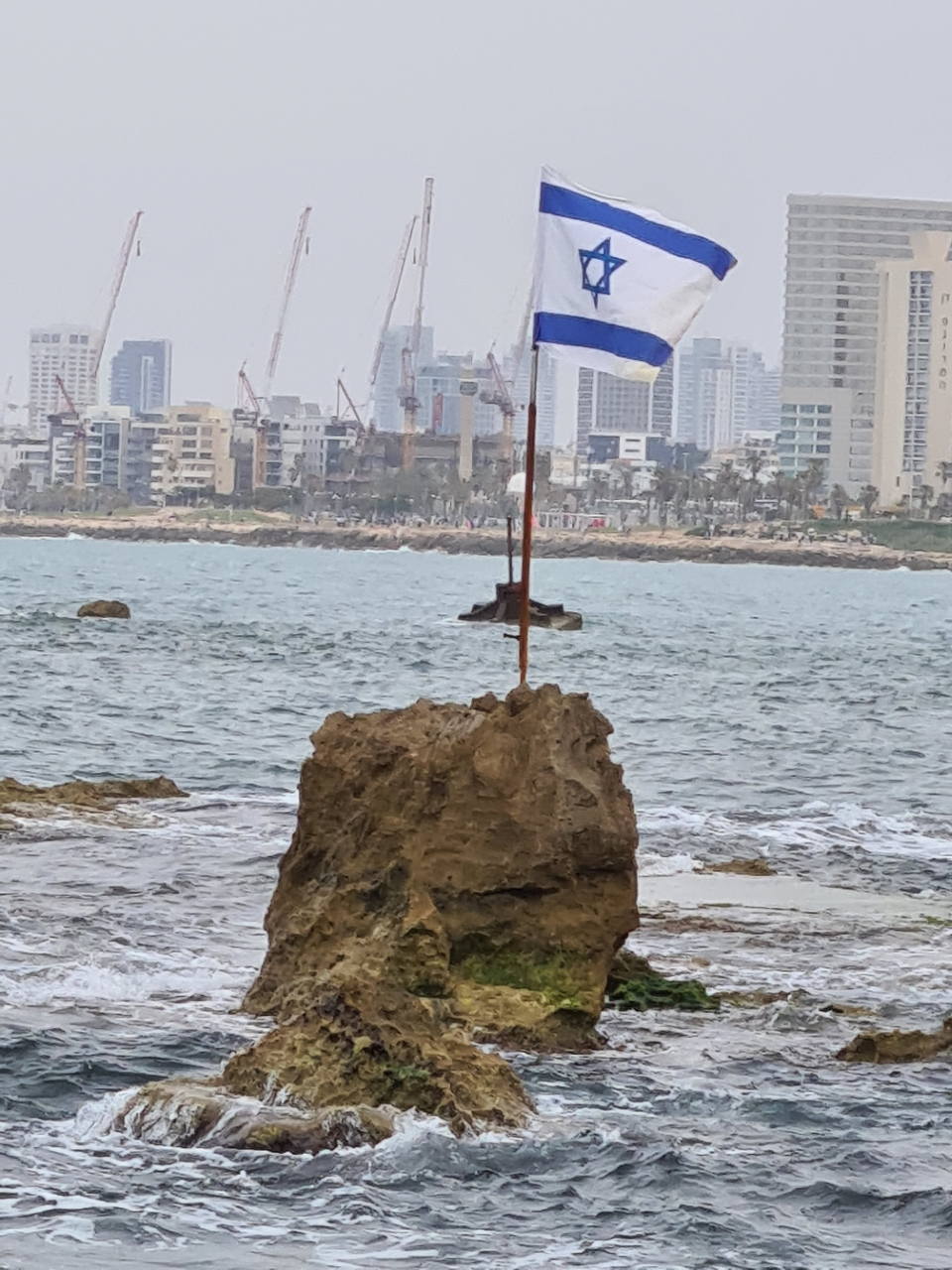
Andromeda's Rock, Israel

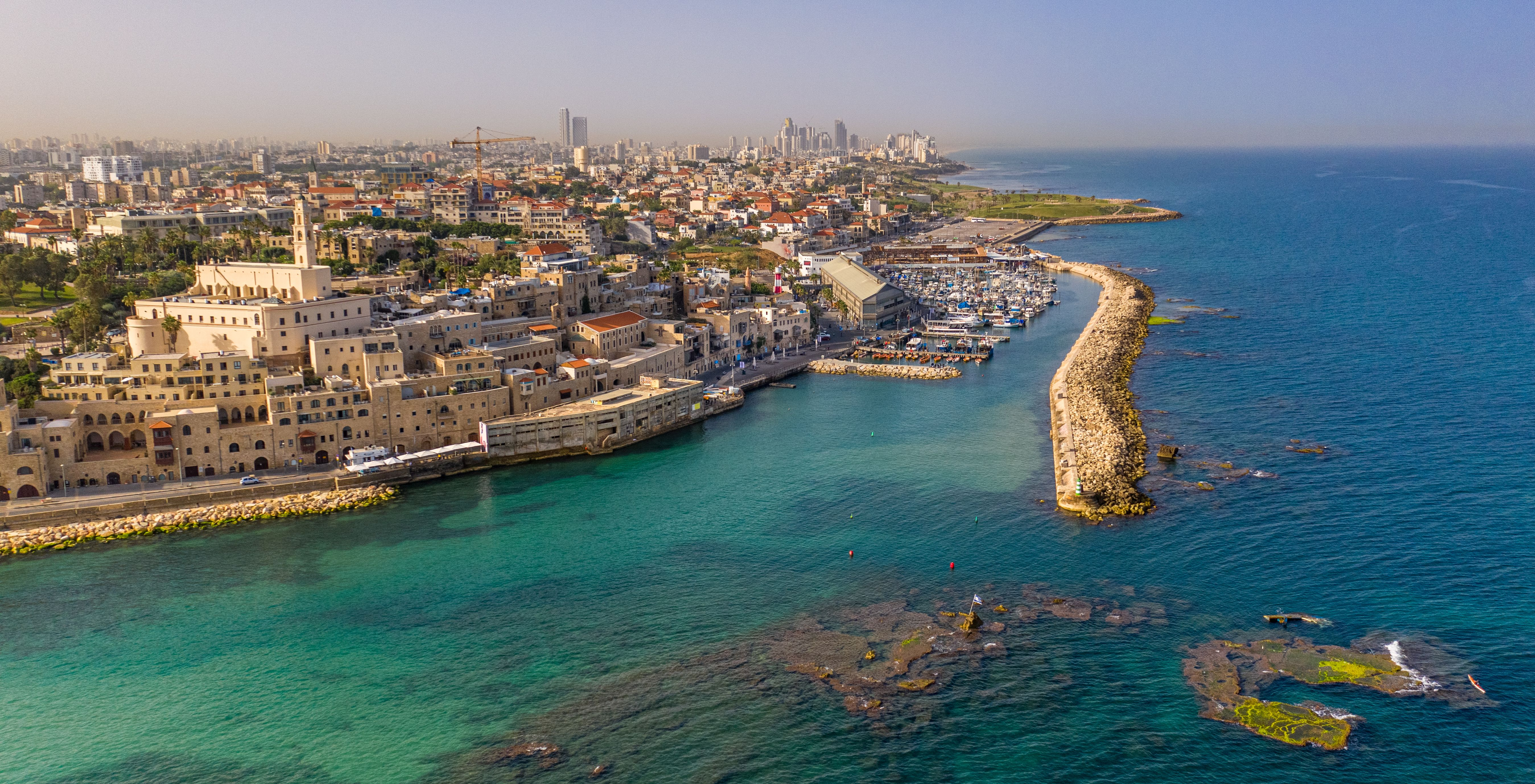
The Port of Jaffa

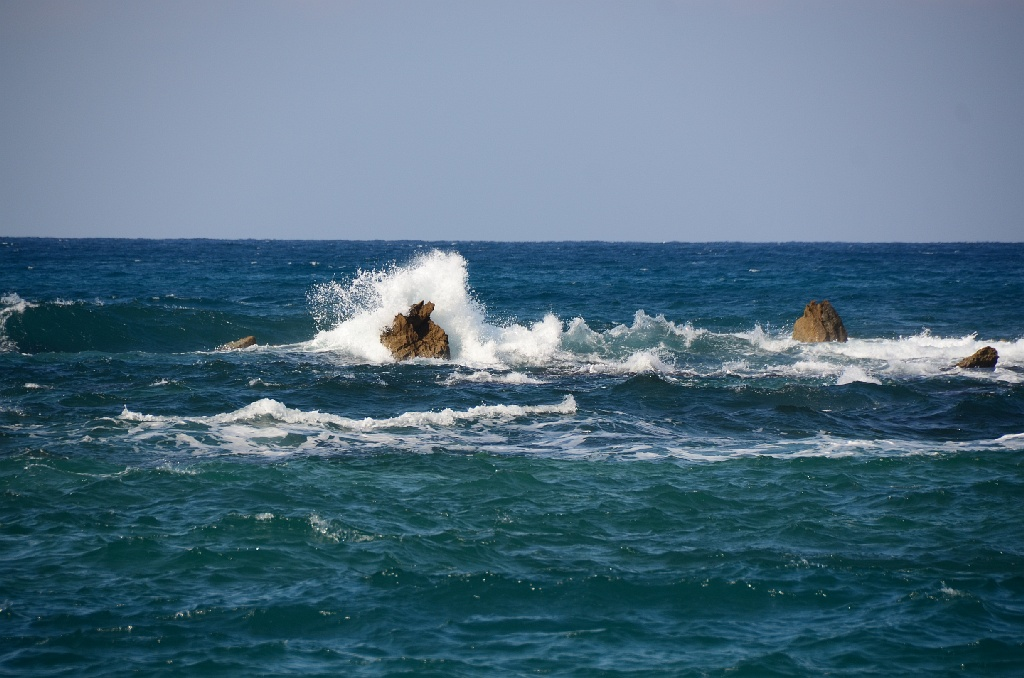
The rock

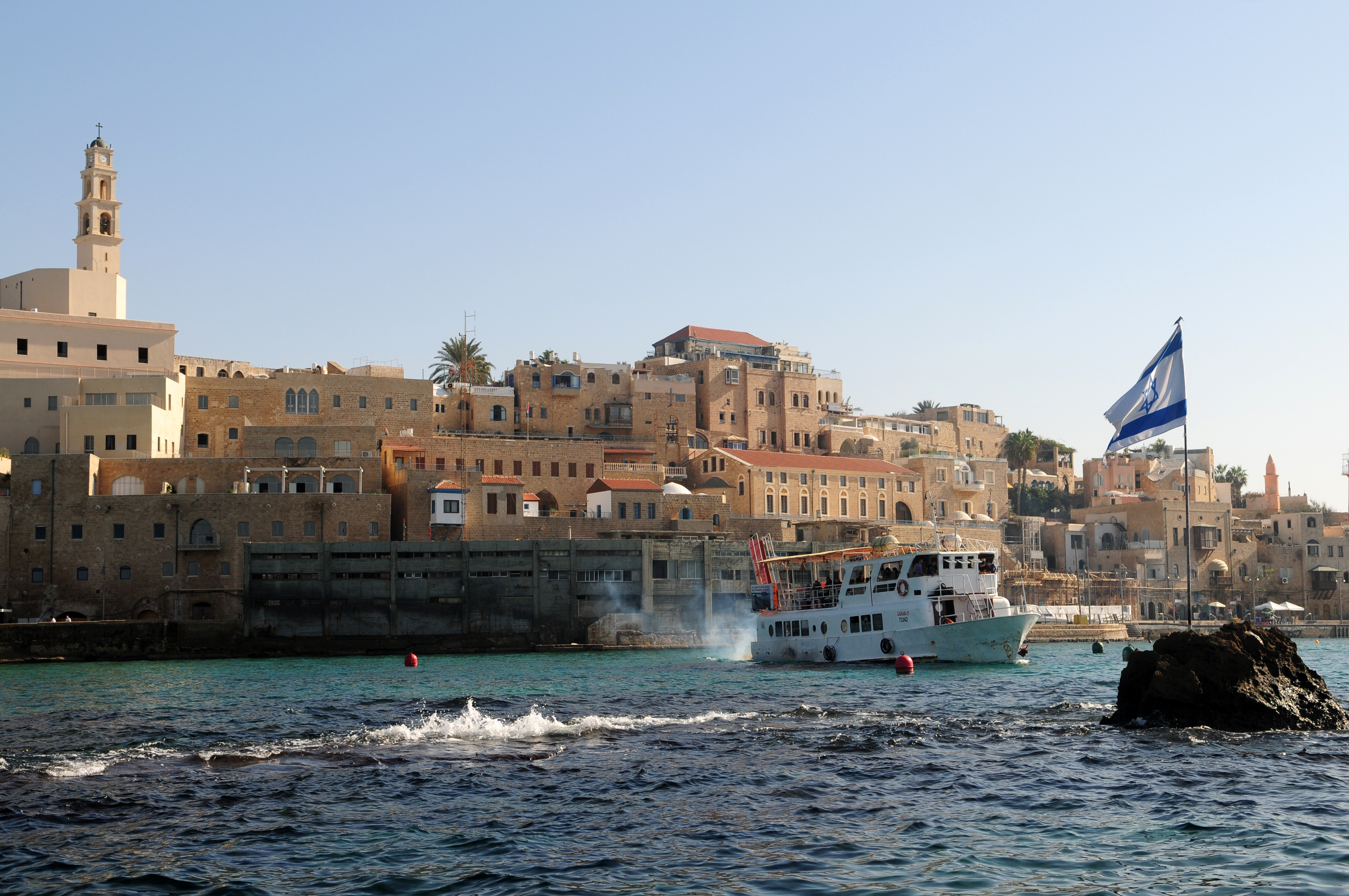
The rock, with Jaffa's port in the background

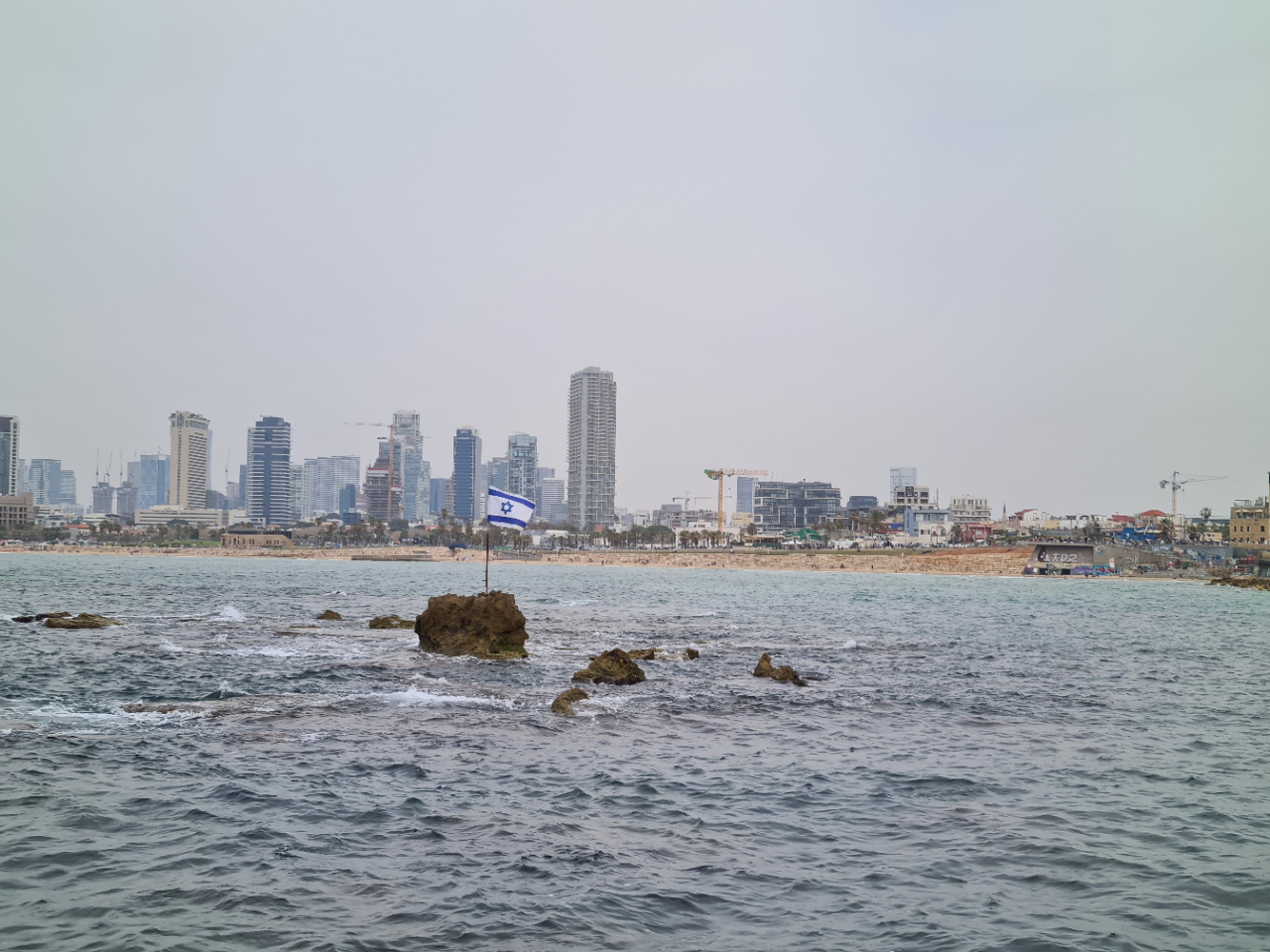
Andromeda's rock
