= Chissioua Mtsamboro =

French island in the archipelago of Mayotte

Coordinates: 12°38′41″S 45°1′53″E

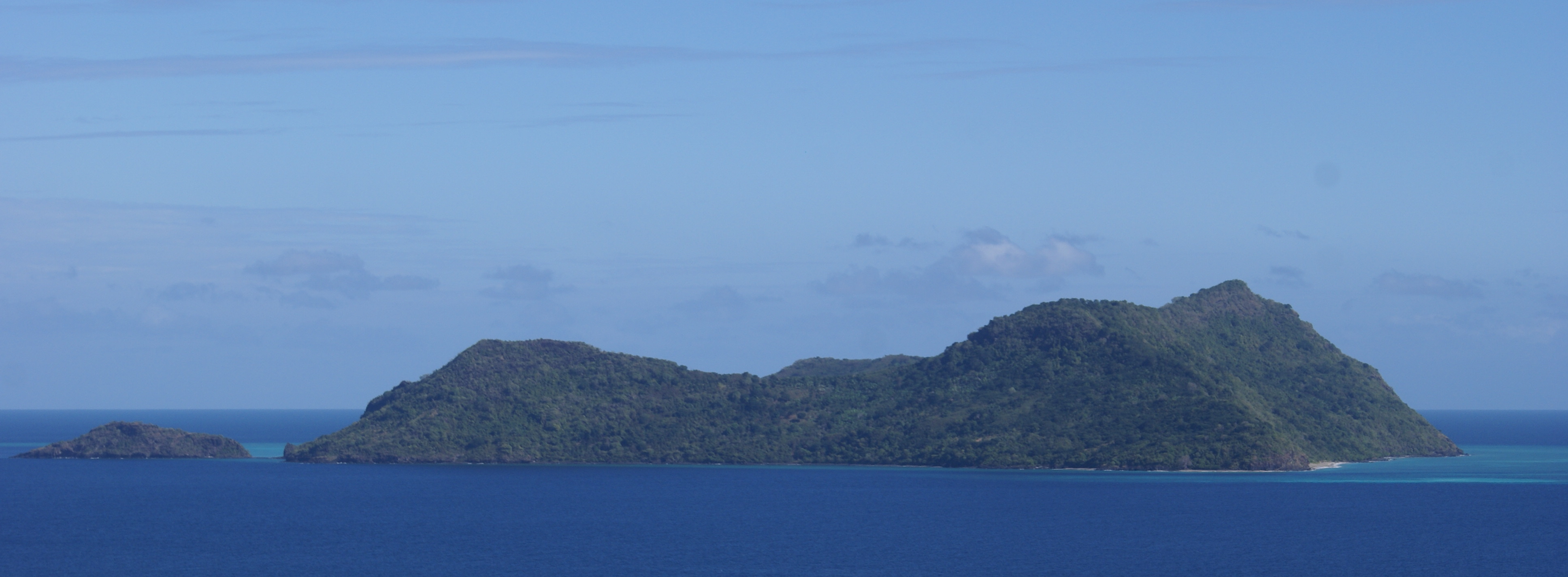
Chissioua Mtsamboro in Mayotte.

The larger island of Chissioua Mtsamboro seen off the northwest coast of Mayotte

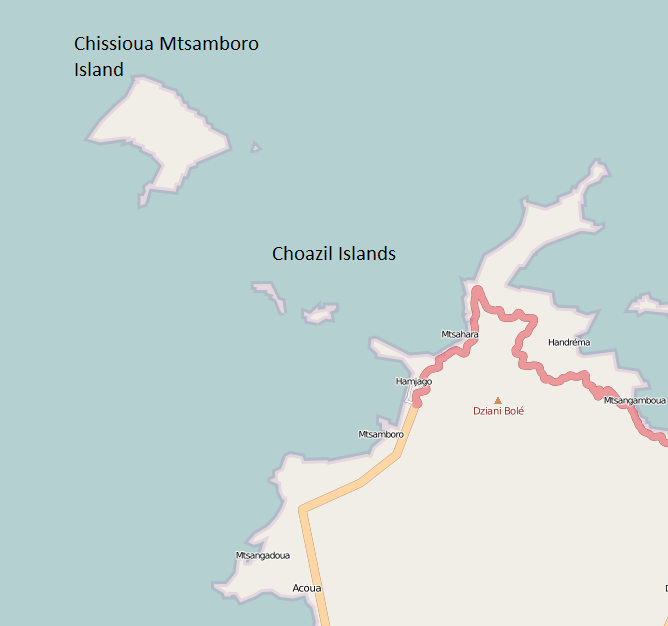
Map

Chissioua Mtsamboro (French pronunciation: [ʃisjua mtsɑ̃bɔʁo]), widely known previously as M'Tsamboro islet, is a French island located in the archipelago of Mayotte, in the Indian Ocean. It lies north of the Choazil Islands, just off the coast of Mtsamboro. This stretch of water is known as the Zamburu Passage, part of the Mozambique Channel. Chissiou Mtsamboro is a mountainous island covering 2.6 square kilometres (1.0 sq mi), providing shelter to the main stretch of beach, tucked away in the southwest of the island which contains a main settlement and numerous huts dotted along the beach. Its highest point reaches an altitude of 273 metres (896 ft). The soundings close to the reef which surrounds the island is from 10 to 15 fathoms (60 to 90 ft; 18 to 27 m).
