= List of islands of Ethiopia =

This is a list of islands of Ethiopia.

== Lake Abaya ==
Islands of Lake Abaya:

- Aghise Island
- Alge Island
- Aruro Island
- Darato Island
- Gatame Island
- Gidicho Island
- Ugayo Island

== Lake Afrera ==
Island(s) of Lake Afrera:

- Franchetti Island

== Lake Shala ==
Island(s) of Lake Shala:

- Pelican Island

== Lake Tana ==
Islands of Lake Tana:

- Daga Island
- Dek Island
- Gelila Zakarias
- Kebran Island
- Mitraha Island
- Rema Island
- Tana Qirqos

== Lake Ziway ==
Islands of Lake Ziway:

- Bird Island
- Debre Sina
- Funduro
- Galila
- Tadecha
- Tulu Gudo

== See also ==
- Geography of Ethiopia
