= Caesarea Islands =

Collection of islands situated near Caesarea, Israel

Native name: איי חוף קיסריה
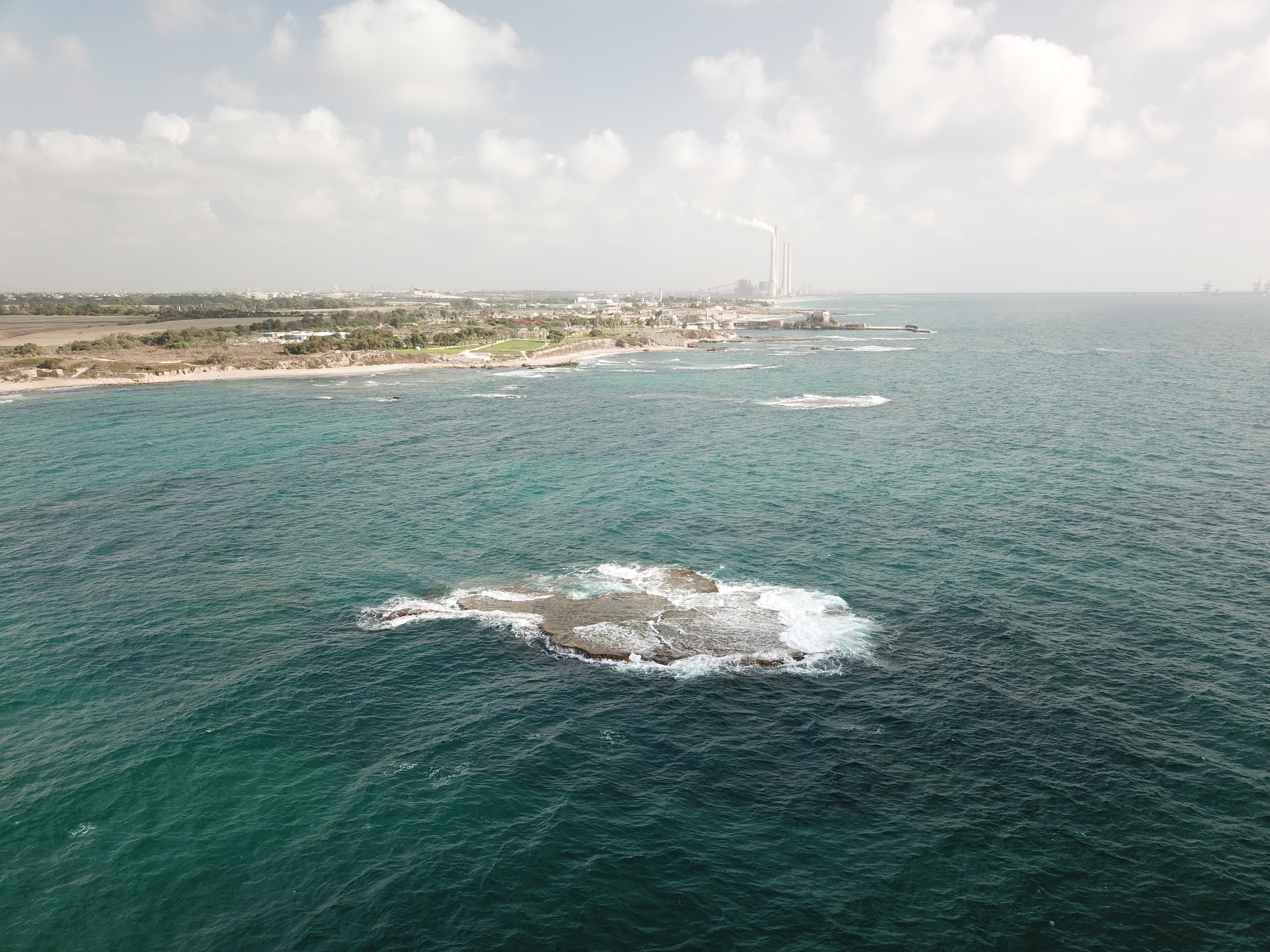
- Interactive map of Caesarea Islands

Geography
- Location: Caesarea beach, Mediterranean Sea

Administration
- Israel

Caesarea Islands are a collection of islands situated near Caesarea, Israel. These islands are remnants of the Kurkar ridge, which became separated from the mainland due to sedimentation.

== Northern Island ==
One notable island in this group is the northern Island, located approximately 400 meters from the coast, north of Caesarea. It is renowned as a diving spot in the Caesarea. The island can be accessed by boat from the Caesarea Club or by a long swim from the Arches Beach, which is situated north of the Caesarea National Park.

== Topography ==
The northern Island is notable for its rich marine life, boasting a higher density of fish and other marine animals compared to other sites around Caesarea. the area features caves that penetrate beneath the island, winding ravines, and long canyons. The surface of the island is marked by a grid-like formation.
