= List of islands of Iraq =

The following is an incomplete list of islands of Iraq.

- Aloos Island, Euphrates (Al Anbar Governorate)
- Hajjam Island
- Jubbah Island, Euphrates (Al Anbar Governorate)
- Om al-Babi Island, Shatt al-Arab
- Om al-Khanazeer Island (Mother of Pigs Island), Baghdad
- Majnoon Island
- Sindbad Island, Shatt al-Arab
- Om Al-Rasas Island (Mother of Lead Island), Shatt al-Arab
- Qanus Island, Tigris (Salah ad Din province)

== See also ==
- Hufaidh, a mythical island in Iraq
- Geography of Iraq
