= Choazil Islands =

Mayotte Islands

Coordinates: 12°40′37″S 45°3′26″E

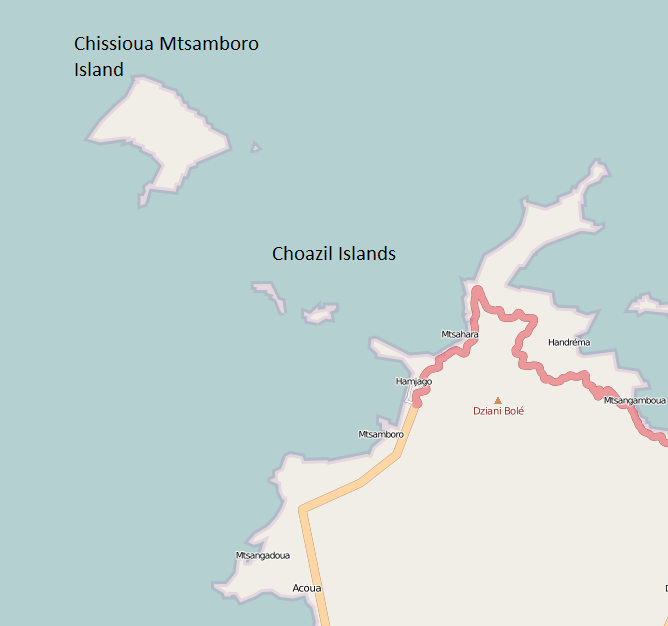
Map

The Choazil Islands, also known as the Malandzamia Islands, are two small islands located off the shore of Mtsamboro, northern Mayotte in the Indian Ocean. To the northwest is the larger Chissioua Mtsamboro (widely known as Zamburu Island). This stretch of water is known as the Choazil Passage, part of the Mozambique Channel.

The provincial capital is the town of Taro, located on the small island of Taro.

Coral reefs border all sides of the island except the southern. The western of the Choazil Islands is 50 metres (164 ft) high. The soundings close to the reef surrounding Zamburu are from 10 to 15 fathoms (60 to 90 ft; 18 to 27 m).
