= Tavşan Islet =

Island in Turkey

Native name: Tavşan Adası
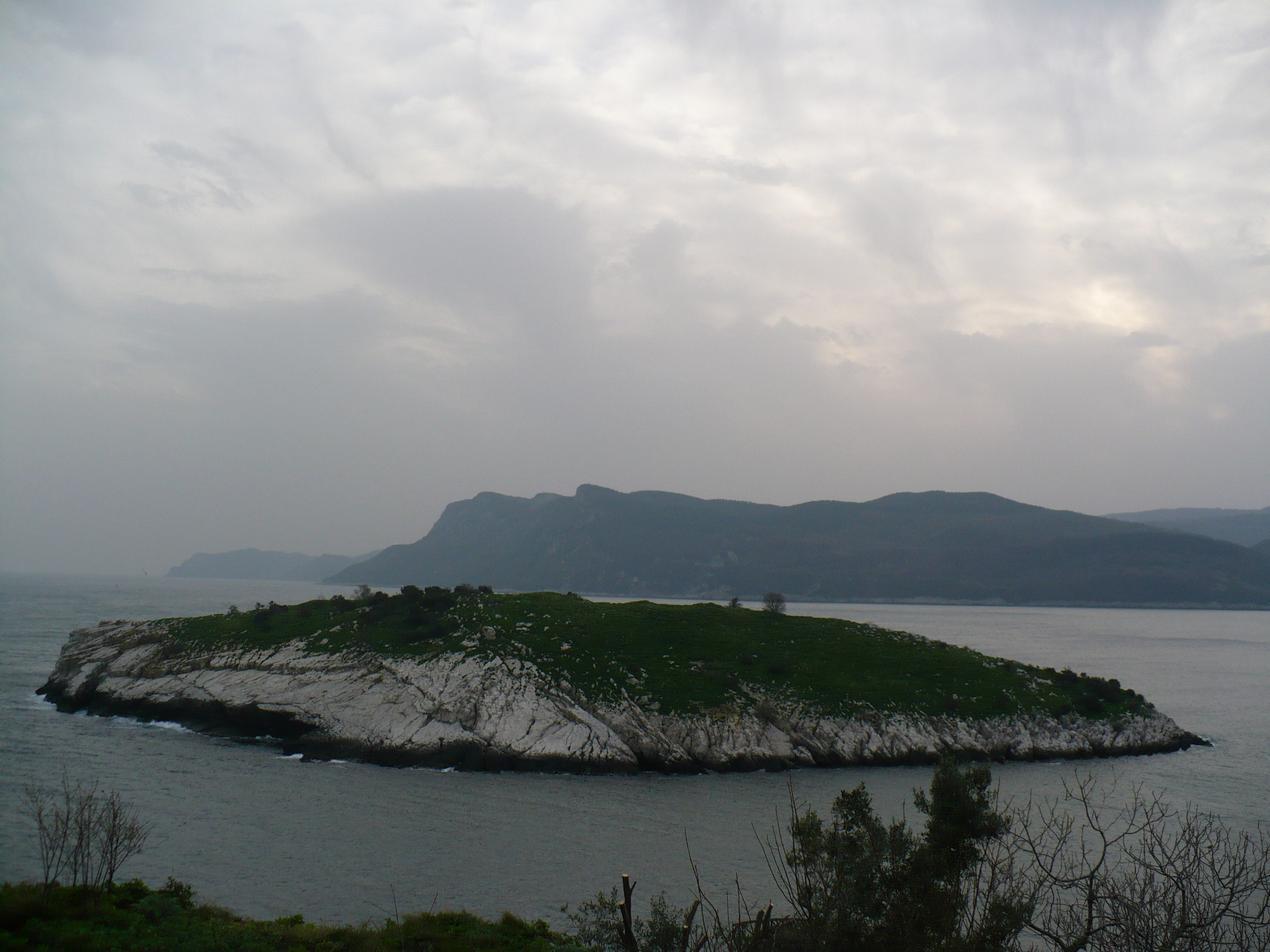
- Tavşan Island

- Location within Turkey
- Interactive map of Tavşan Islet

Geography
- Location: Black Sea
- Coordinates: 41°45′06″N 32°23′03″E
- Area: 0,025 km^{2} (9.7 sq mi)
- İl (province): Bartın Province
- İlçe: Amasra

Tavşan Islet (literally "Rabbit Islet" ) is a Black Sea islet in Turkey. It is named after the rabbits of the island.

The islet is situated to the north of Amasra ilçe (district) of Bartın Province at 41°45′06″N 32°23′03″E. Its distance to coast is less than 200 metres (660 ft). Its area is about 25,000 square metres (270,000 sq ft).

There are ruins of a cross shaped-plan church in the island from Republic of Genoa occupation era in the Medieval age. Currently, the island is uninhabited. But there are frequent visitors from the main land because of a belief that the sick people who pass through a rock gap in the north eastern part of the island soon get well.
