= Hoynat Islet =

Island in Turkey

Hoynat Island
Native name: Hoynat Adası
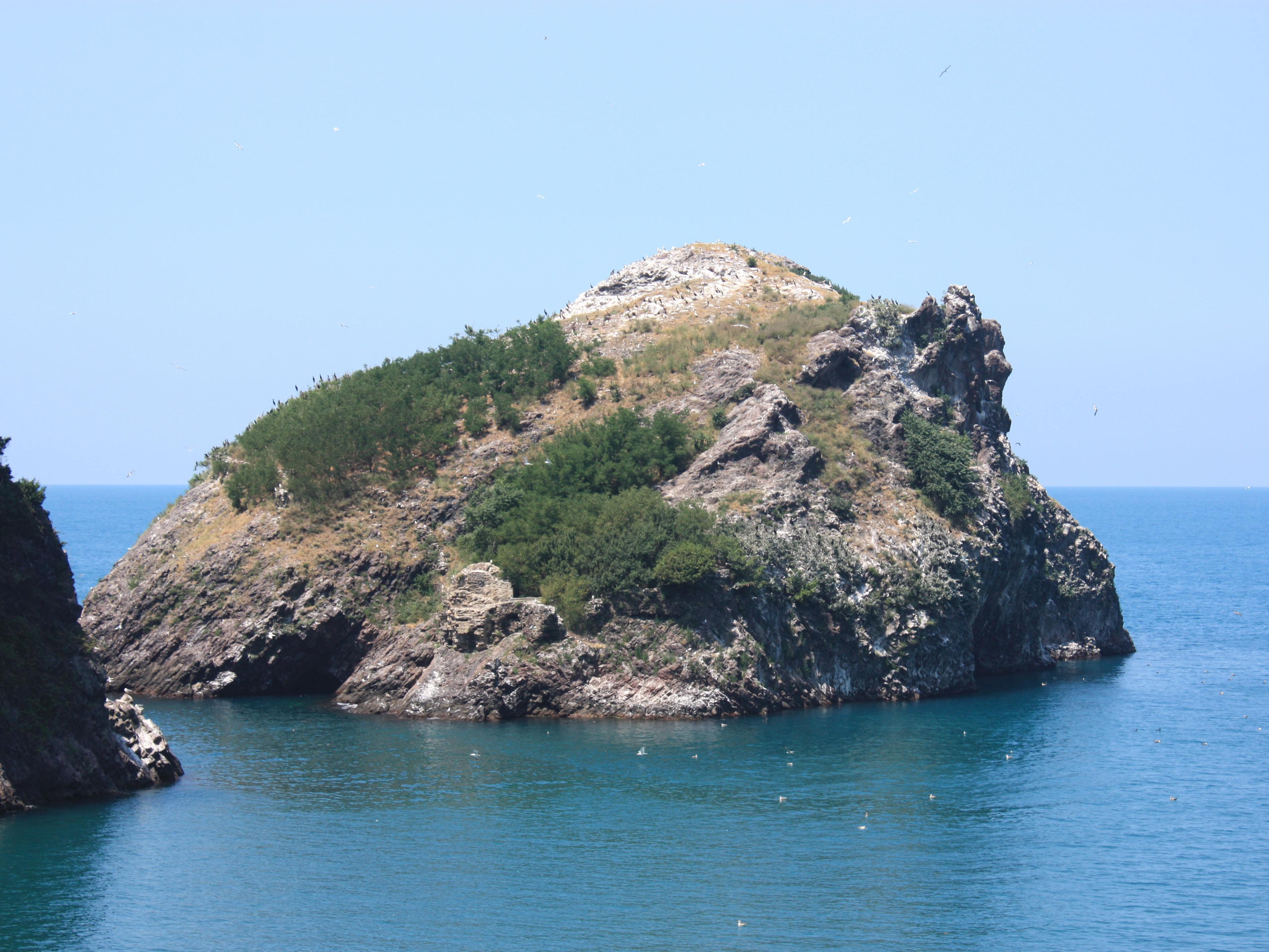
- From the mainland (south)

- Location within Turkey
- Interactive map of Hoynat Island

Geography
- Location: Black Sea
- Coordinates: 41°07′03″N 37°43′43″E

Administration
- Turkey
- İl (province): Ordu Province
- İlçe: Perşembe

Hoynat Islet (a.k.a. Perşembe Islet Turkish: Hoynat Adası) is a Turkish islet in the Black Sea.

Administratively it is a part of Perşembe ilçe (district) of Ordu Province. The distance between the coast and the islet is less than 100 metres (330 ft). The total area of the islet is about 700 square metres (7,500 sq ft).

Historically the uninhabited islet was a hideout and storage location of the sailors. Now the island is known as the main reproduction area of the European shags in Turkey.
