= Sacalin Island =

Island in Danube delta in Romania

Coordinates: 44°47′15″N 29°32′29″E

Sacalin Island is a newly formed island in the Black Sea, right off the coast of the Romanian Danube Delta, off the Sfântu Gheorghe branch. Initially Sacalin was made up of two smaller islands, Sacalinu Mare [Greater Sacalin] (1400 ha) and Sacalinu Mic [Lesser Sacalin] (90 ha). In time, the two merged into one continuous landmass. The Romanian government has declared the area an ecological reserve Sacalin-Zătoane (21410 ha) and no settlement is permitted on the island. Sakalin-Zătoane Island is surrounded on all sides by lakes, fishponds, rivers, canals and the Black Sea.
