= Snake Island (Ukraine) =

Island in the Black Sea

Native name: острів Зміїний
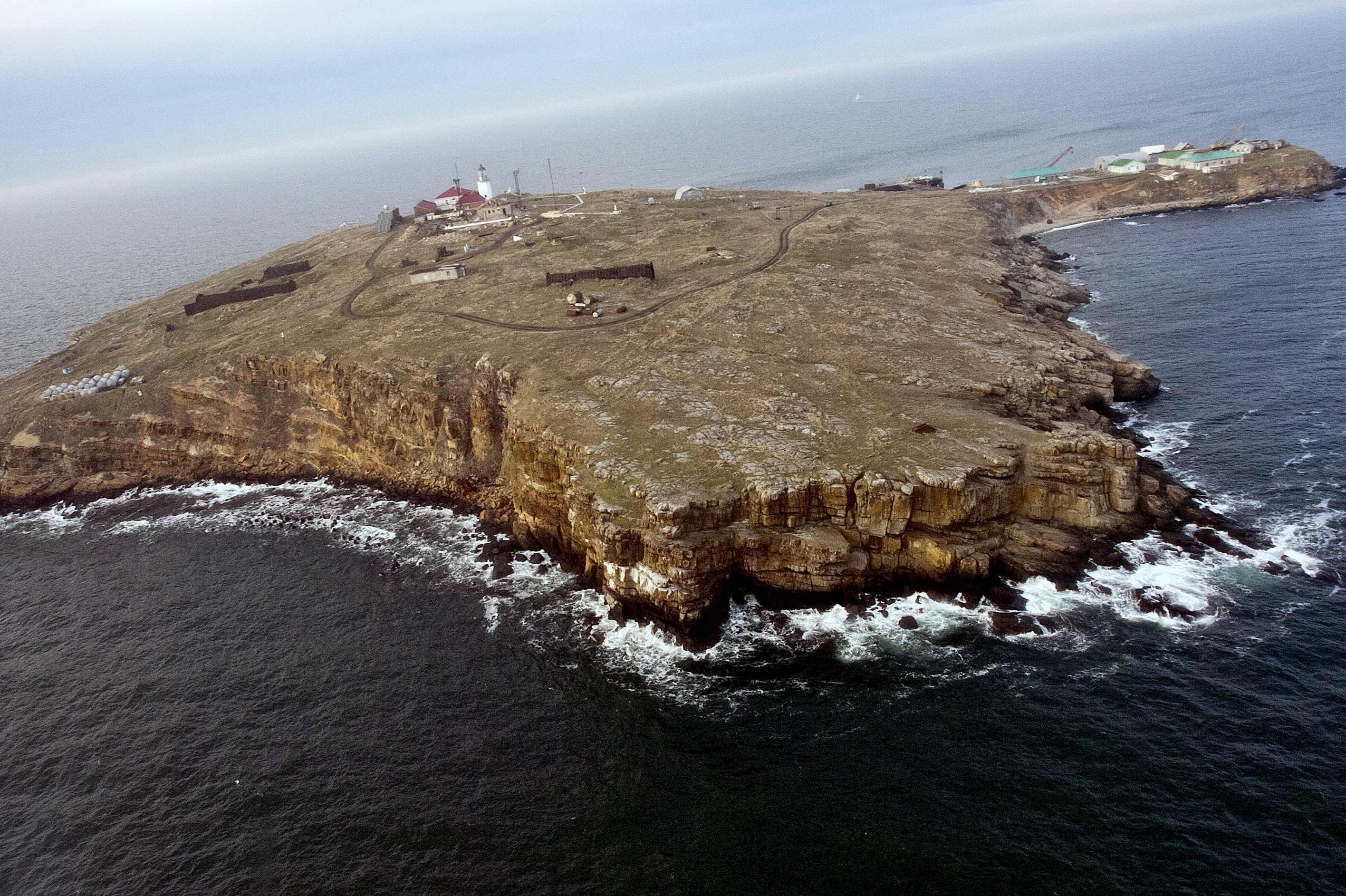
- 2008 photo of the island

- Location within Odesa Oblast Location within Ukraine Location within Black Sea

Geography
- Location: Black Sea
- Coordinates: 45°15′N 30°12′E
- Area: 0.17 km^{2} (0.066 sq mi)
- Length: 662 m (2172 ft)
- Width: 440 m (1440 ft)
- Highest elevation: 41 m (135 ft)
- Highest point: N/An

Administration
- Ukraine
- Oblast: Odesa Oblast
- Raion: Izmail Raion
- Hromada: Vylkove urban hromada
- Largest settlement: Bile

Demographics
- Population: 0
- Pop. density: 0/km^{2} (0/sq mi)

Immovable Monument of National Significance of Ukraine
- Official name: Культурний шар о. Зміїний (Cultural layer of the Snake Island)
- Type: Archaeology
- Reference no.: 150015-Н

Snake Island, also known as Serpent Island, White Island, Island of Achilles or Zmiinyi Island (Ukrainian: острів Зміїний, romanized: ostriv Zmiinyi; Romanian: Insula Șerpilor), is a Ukrainian island located in the Black Sea, near the Danube Delta, with an important role in delimiting Ukrainian territorial waters.

The island has been known since classical antiquity, and during that era hosted a Greek temple to Achilles. Today, it is administered as part of Izmail Raion of Ukraine's Odesa Oblast.

The island was reported to have under 30 people in 2012. Ukraine had founded a village, Bile, in February 2007 to consolidate the status of the island as an inhabited place. This happened during a border dispute between Romania and Ukraine from 2004 to 2009, during which Romania contested the technical definition of the island and its maritime borders. The territorial limits of the continental shelf around Snake Island were delineated by the International Court of Justice in 2009, providing Romania with almost 80% of the disputed maritime territory.

In the Russian invasion of Ukraine, two Russian navy warships attacked and captured Snake Island. It was subsequently bombarded heavily by Ukraine and recaptured within a few months, following a Russian withdrawal.

== Geography and ecology ==
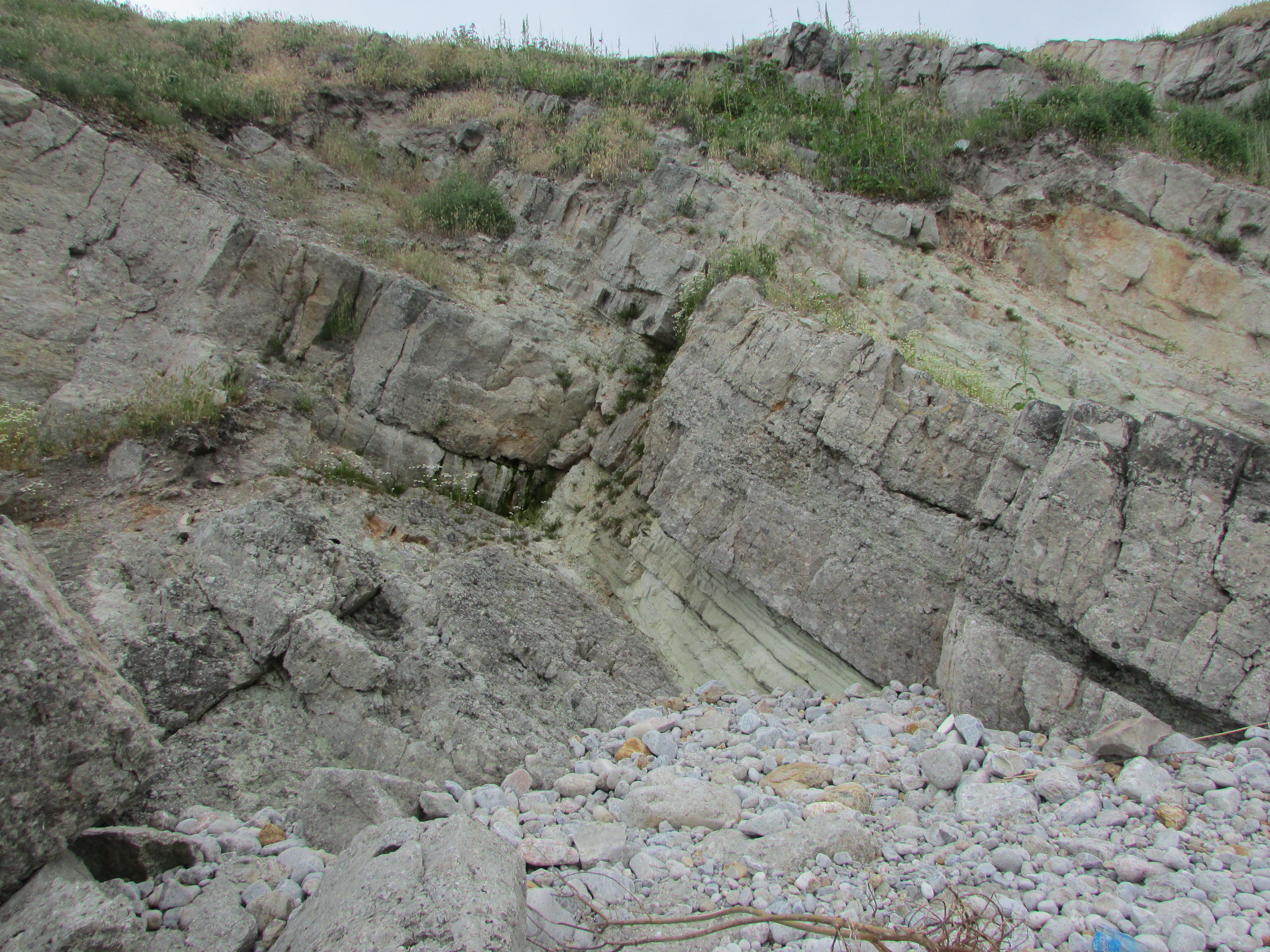
Rock outcrop of conglomerate on the island

Snake Island is located 35 km from the coast, east of the mouth of the Danube River. The island is irregularly shaped, with an area of 0.205 km^{2} (0.079 sq mi) and a maximum diameter of about 700m. The gently sloping terrain reaches its highest point 41 metres (135 ft) above sea level.

The bedrock of the island consists of Silurian and Devonian sedimentary rocks, primarily metamorphosed, highly cemented quartzite conglomerate-breccias, with subordinate conglomerate, sandstone and clay, which form cliffs surrounding the island up to 25 metres high. The structural geology of the island is defined by a wavy monocline oriented to the northeast, with a small anticline in the eastern part of the island. The island is crisscrossed by faults with both N-S and NE-SW orientations.

The nearest coastal location to the island is Kubanskyi Island on the Ukrainian part of the Danube Delta, located 35 km (22 mi) away between the Bystroe Canal and Skhidnyi Channel. The closest Romanian coastal city, Sulina, is 45 km (28 mi) away. The closest Ukrainian city is Vylkove, 50 km (31 mi) away, though the port of Ust-Dunaisk is closer at 44 km (27 mi).

At the end of 2011, 58 fish species (12 of which are included in the Red Data Book of Ukraine) and six crab species were recorded in the coastal waters of Zmiinyi Island. A presidential decree of 9 December 1998, Number 1341/98, declared the island and coastal waters as a state-protected area. The total protected area covers 232 hectares (570 acres).

The island was one of the last hauling-out sites in the basin for critically endangered Mediterranean monk seals until the 1950s.

Blackish individuals of the dice snake were once common on Snake Island

The eponymous snake population was identified as the non-venomous dice snake (Natrix tessellata), a smallish colubrid which is widespread in the Black Sea region. The local population was probably never large (and may be entirely extinct nowadays) due to the complete absence of the wetland habitats and amphibian prey preferred by Natrix snakes. It was notable for a high proportion of melanistic individuals and once proposed as a distinct subspecies Natrix tessellata heinrothi. But apart from the proportion of color morphs (which is probably due the founder effect), no consistent differences from continental dice snakes were noted, and the supposed subspecies is not considered distinct anymore. Since the presence of snakes on the island was only prominently noted on the island in the Medieval era – it was called "White Island", and known for its seabirds but not for its snakes, in Antiquity –, their origin is unclear and introduction by humans in historic times cannot be ruled out.

== Population and infrastructure ==
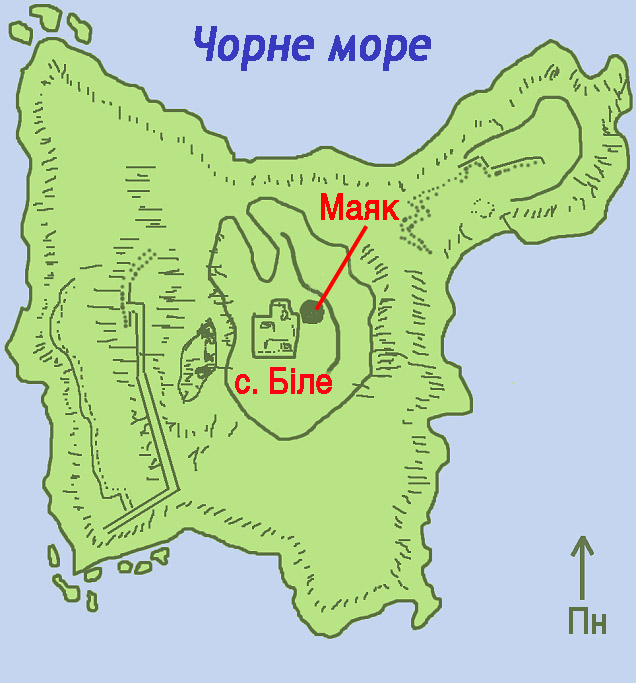
Map of the island

About 100 inhabitants live on the island's only settlement, Bile, mostly frontier guard servicemen with their families and technical personnel. In 2003, an initiative of the Odesa I. I. Mechnikov National University established the Ostriv Zmiinyi marine research station every year, at which scientists and students from the university conduct research on local fauna, flora, geology, meteorology, atmospheric chemistry, and hydrobiology.

In accordance with a 1997 Treaty between Romania and Ukraine, the Ukrainian authorities withdrew an army radio division, demolished a military radar, and transferred all other infrastructure to civilians. Eventually, the Romania-Ukraine international relationships soured (see "Maritime delimitation" section) when Romania tried to assert that the island is no more than a rock in the sea. In February 2007, the Verkhovna Rada approved establishing a rural settlement as part of Vylkove city which is located some distance away at the mouth of the Danube.

In addition to a helicopter platform, in 2002 a pier was built for ships with up to 8 meter draught, and construction of a harbour is underway. The island is supplied with navigation equipment, including a 150-year-old lighthouse. Electric power is provided by a dual solar/diesel power station. The island also has civil infrastructure such as the marine research station, a post office, a bank (branch of the Ukrainian bank "Aval"), the first-aid station, a satellite television provider, a phone network, a cell phone tower, and an Internet link. Most of building structures are located either in the middle of the island by a lighthouse or the northeastern peninsula of the island by its pier.

The island lacks a fresh water source. Its border guard contingent is regularly resupplied by air. Since 2009 the development of the island was suspended due to financing which caused a great degree of concern of local authorities asking for more funding from the state.

=== Lighthouse ===
Snake Island Lighthouse
- Mаяк
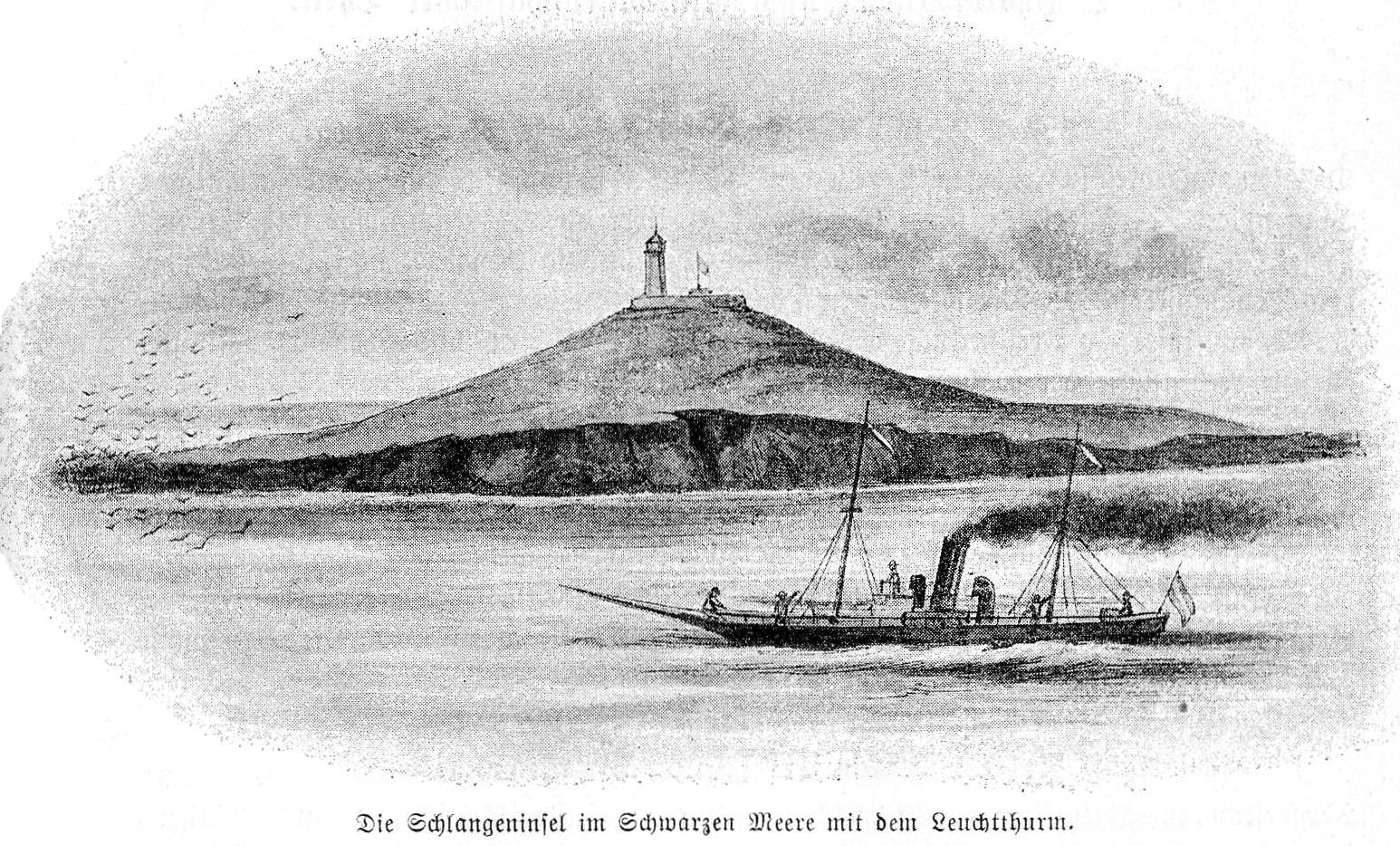
- The lighthouse in the background in 1896

General information
- Type: service
- Location: Bile, Ukraine
- Elevation: 40 metres (130 ft)
- Completed: Autumn 1842

Height
- Height: 12 metres (39 ft)

Design and construction
- Main contractor: Black Sea Fleet

The Snake Island Lighthouse was built in the autumn of 1842 by the Black Sea Fleet of the Russian Empire. The lighthouse is an octagonal-shaped building, 12 meters tall, located near the highest elevated area of the island, 40 meters above the sea level. The lighthouse built on site of the previously destroyed temple of Achilles is adjacent to a housing building. The remnants of the Greek temple were found in 1823.

As lighthouse technology progressed, in 1860 new lighthouse lamps were bought from England, and one of them was installed in the Lighthouse in 1862. In the early 1890s a new kerosene lamp was installed, with lamp rotating equipment and flat lenses. It improved the lighthouse visibility to 37 kilometres (20 nmi). The lighthouse was either destroyed or damaged in the First World War (it is not clear which). It was subsequently rebuilt (see #World War I below).

The lighthouse was heavily damaged during World War II by Soviet aviation and German retreating forces. It was restored at the end of 1944 by the Odesa military radio detachment. In 1949 it was further reconstructed and equipped by the Black Sea Fleet. The lighthouse was further upgraded in 1975 and 1984. In 1988 a new radio beacon "KPM-300" was installed with radio signal range of 280 kilometres (150 nmi).

In August 2004, the lighthouse was equipped with a radio beacon "Yantar-2M-200", which provides differential correction signal for global navigation satellite systems GPS and GLONASS.

The lighthouse is listed as UKR 050 by ARLHS, EU-182 by IOTA, and BS-07 by UIA.

== History and mythology ==
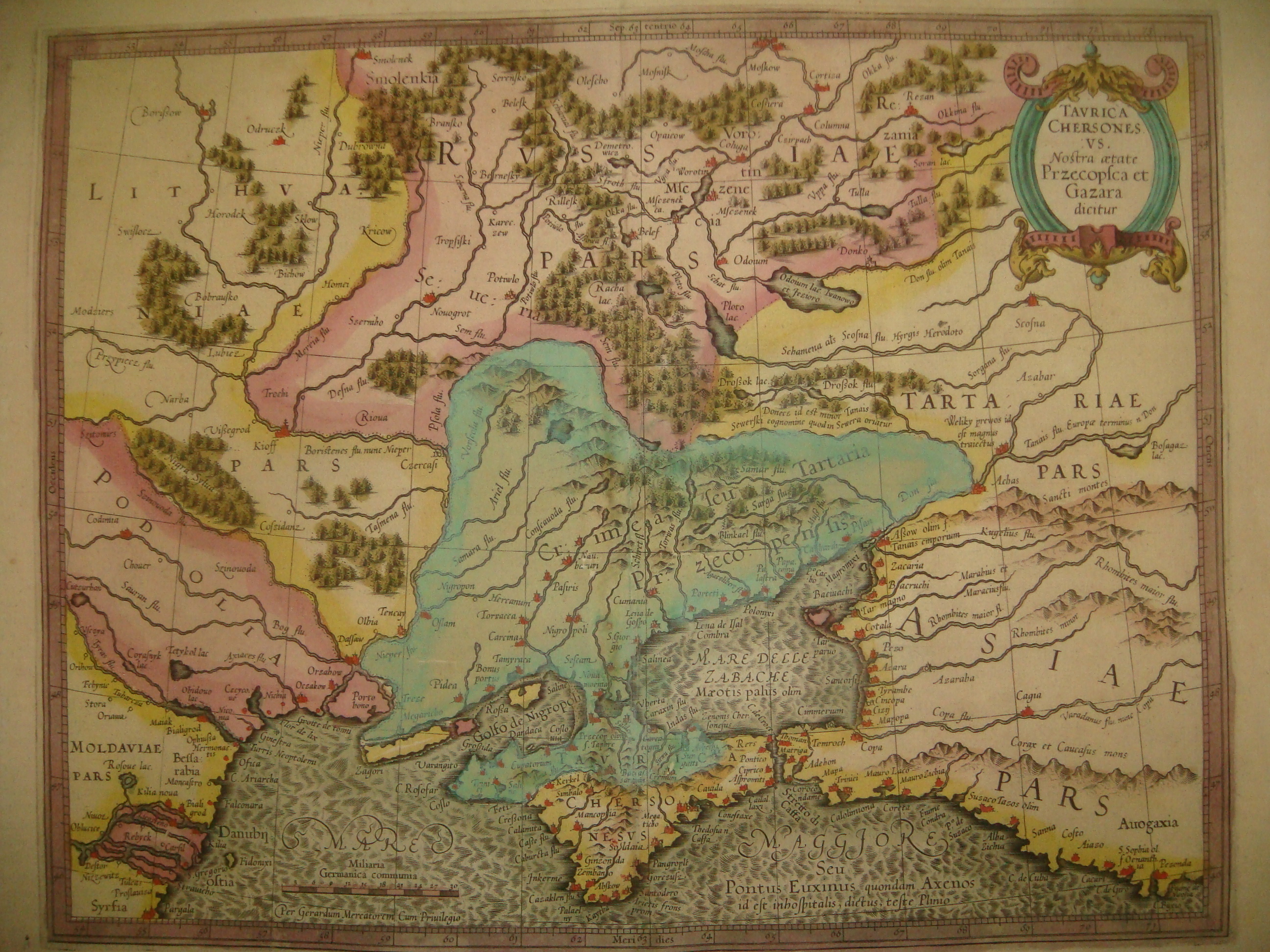
Fidonixi on the Mercator's map

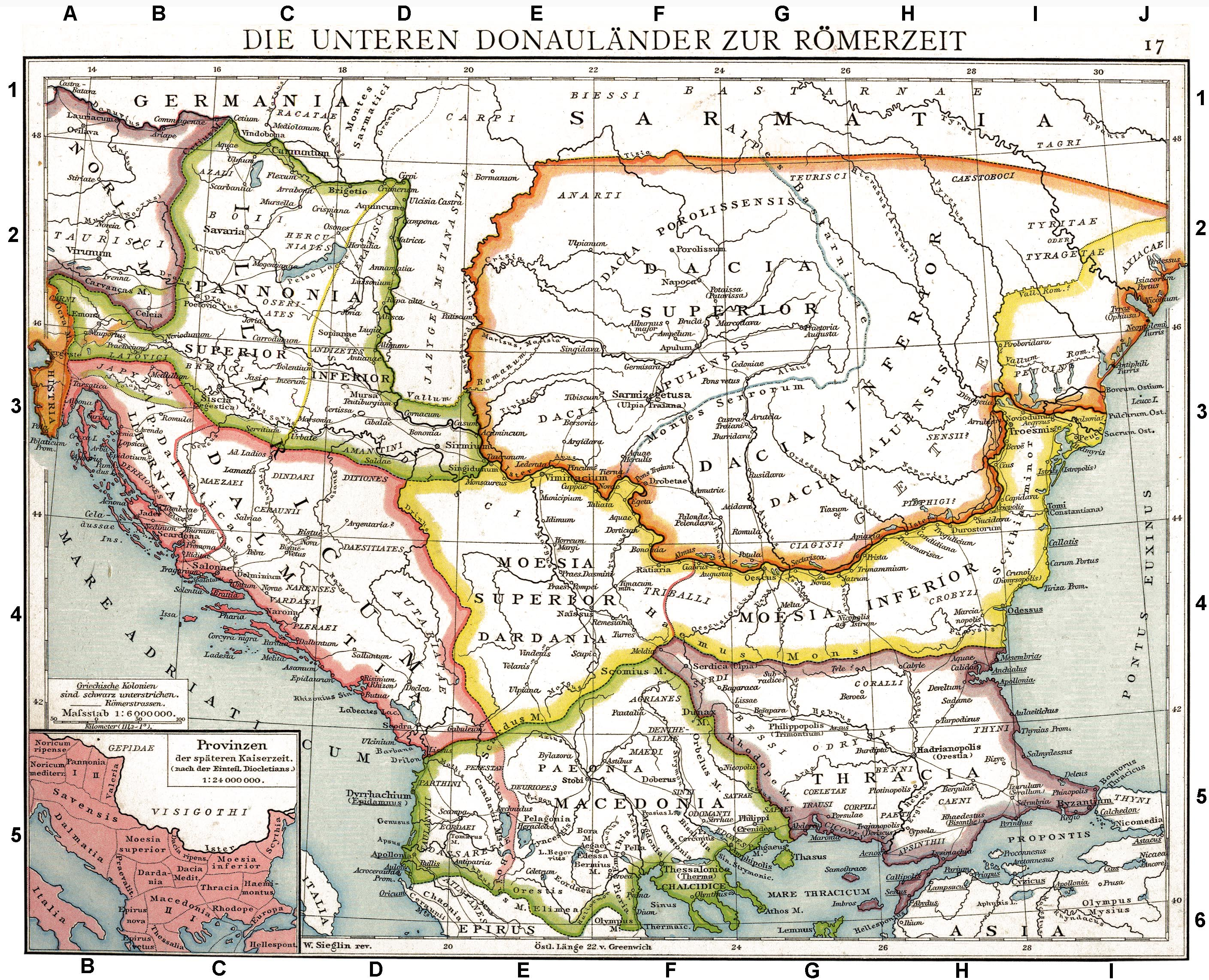
The island carries the name of Leuce on this map of Johann Gustav Droysen

=== Ancient history and myths ===
The island was named Leuke (Ancient Greek: Λευκή, 'White Island') by the Greeks, and was similarly known by Romans as Alba, probably because of its white marble formations. According to Dionysius Periegetes, it was called Leuke because the serpents there were white. According to John Tzetzes, the island was named "White" either because it appears white from sea foam or because it is home to many white birds. Joannes Zonaras writes that it was called white because of the white birds. According to Arrian, it was called Leuke due to its color. He and Stephanus of Byzantium mentioned that the island was also referred to as the Island of Achilles (Ancient Greek: Ἀχιλλέως νῆσος and Ἀχίλλεια νῆσος) and the Racecourse of Achilles (Δρόμον Ἀχιλλέως and Ἀχίλλειος δρόμος), though this is now identified with the Tendra Spit. Pliny wrote that it was also known as Macaron (Μακάρων, 'Island of the Blessed'). John Tzetzes writes that the island was also known as Spilos (Σπῖλος). In a Nemean Ode, Pindar refers to it as "the shining island of Achilles" (φαεννὰν Ἀχιλεὺς νᾶσον).

The island was sacred to the hero Achilles and had a temple of him with a statue inside. Solinus wrote that on the island stood a sacred shrine into which no bird would enter; if by chance one did fly in, it would quickly hasten away. According to Arrian, in the temple there were many offerings to Achilles and Patroclus. Furthermore, people came to the island and sacrificed or set animals free in honour of Achilles. He also added that people said that Achilles and Patroclus appeared in front of them as hallucinations or in their dreams while they were approaching the coast of the island or sailing a short distance from it. Pliny the Elder wrote that the tomb of the hero was on the island. According to the legend, on the island no bird flew higher than the temple of Achilles.

The uninhabited isle Achilleis ("of Achilles") was the major sanctuary of the hero, where "seabirds dipped their wings in water to sweep the temples clean", according to Constantine D. Kyriazis. Several temples of Thracian Apollo can be found here, and there are submerged ruins.

According to Greek myths the island was created by Poseidon for Achilles to inhabit, but also for sailors to have an island to anchor at the Euxine Sea, but the sailors should never sleep on the island. According to a surviving epitome of the lost Trojan War epic of Arctinus of Miletus, the remains of Achilles and Patroclus were brought to this island by Thetis, to be put in a sanctuary, furnishing the aition, or founding myth of the Hellenic cult of Achilles centred here. According to another myth Thetis gave the island to Achilles and let him live there. The oracle of Delphi sent Leonymus (other writers called him Autoleon) to the Island, telling him that there Ajax the Great would appear to him and cure his wound. Leonymus said that on the island he saw Achilles, Ajax the Great, Ajax the Lesser, Patroclus, Antilochus and Helen of Troy. In addition, Helen told him to go to Stesichorus at Himera and tell him that the loss of his sight was caused by her wrath. Pomponius Mela wrote that Achilles was buried there and the island had the eponym of Achillea. Apollodorus writes that the Greeks buried Achilles together with Patroclus on the island, mingling their bones.

In Andromache, a work of Euripides, Thetis mention the island and said that Achilles was "dwelling on his island home".

Antoninus Liberalis writes that Artemis transported Iphigenia to the island, where she joined Achilles. There, the goddess transformed her into an ageless, immortal being, gave her the name Orsilochia, and Iphigenia became Achilles companion. By contrast, John Tzetzes mentions another myth, in which Achilles fell in love with Iphigenia and searched for her, when he failed to find her, he settled on the island.

Ruins believed to be of a square temple dedicated to Achilles, 30 meters to a side, were discovered by the Russian naval Captain N. D. Kritzkii in 1823, but the subsequent construction of a lighthouse on the site obliterated all trace of it. Ovid, who was banished to Tomis, mentions the island, so do Ptolemy and Strabo. The island is described in Pliny the Elder's Natural History, IV.27.1. It is also described in Arrian's Letter to Emperor Hadrian, a historical document movingly drawn upon by Marguerite Yourcenar in her Memoirs of Hadrian.

Several ancient inscriptions were found on the island, including a 4th-century BC Olbiopolitan decree which praises someone for defeating and driving out the pirates that lived on the "holy island". Another inscription which found on the island and dates back to the fifth century BC writes: "Glaukos, son of Posideios, dedicated me to Achilles, lord of Leuke"

A fragment was found on the island which was signed by the ancient painter Epiktetos and the potter Nikosthenes.

The island was one of the three sites in the Black Sea which stand out in the cult of Achilles, the other two being the Racecourse of Achilles and the Pontic Olbia.

=== Ottoman era ===
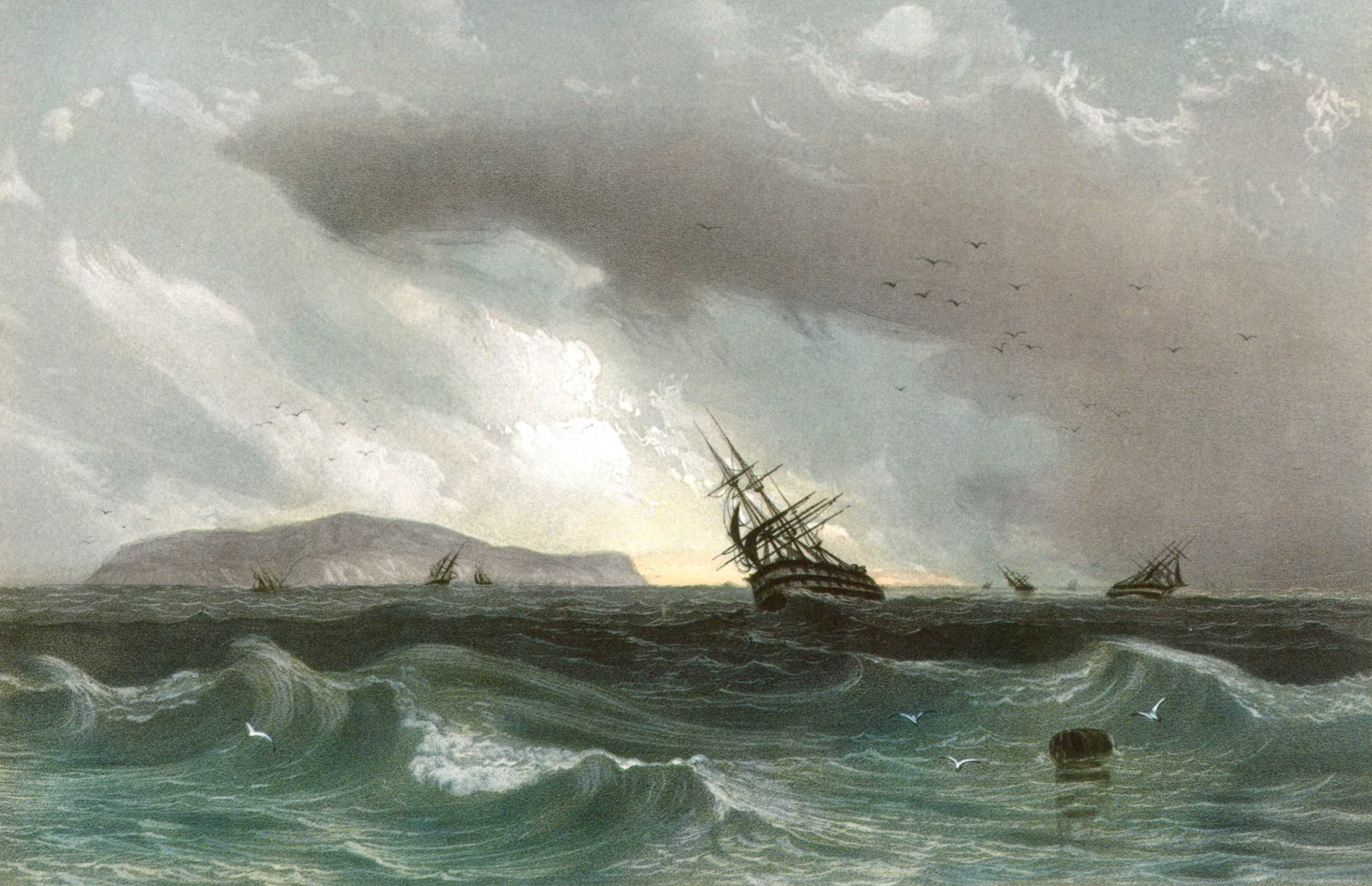
Snake Island (Ostriv Zmiinyi) by Carlo Bossoli, 1856

The Greeks during the Ottoman Empire renamed it Fidonisi (Greek: Φιδονήσι, 'Snake Island') and the island gave its name to the naval Battle of Fidonisi, fought between the Ottoman and Russian fleets in 1788, during the course of the Russo-Turkish War of 1787–1792.

In 1829, following the Russo-Turkish War of 1828–1829, the island became part of the Russian Empire until 1856. Adèle Hommaire de Hell and Xavier Hommaire de Hell who traveled through the region, described their experiences in a book published in 1847, noting that the Russians had retained the original Greek name of Fidonisi. They also observed that the island was long uninhabited and mentioned the presence of ruins, suggesting that it would be of interest to explore them further, as some inscriptions had been discovered there.

In 1877, following the Russo-Turkish War of 1877–1878, the Ottoman Empire gave the island and Northern Dobruja region to Romania, as a reimbursement for the Russian annexation of Romania's Southern Bessarabia region.

=== World War I and interwar period ===
As part of the Romanian alliance with Russia, the Russians operated a wireless station on the island, which was destroyed on 25 June 1917 when it was bombarded by the Ottoman cruiser Midilli (built as SMS Breslau of the German Navy). The lighthouse (built by Marius Michel Pasha in 1860) was also damaged and possibly destroyed.

The 1920 Treaty of Versailles reconfirmed the island as part of Romania. The lighthouse was rebuilt in 1922.

=== World War II ===
The island, under Romanian control during the Second World War, was the location of a radio station used by the Axis forces, which turned it into a target for the Soviet Black Sea Fleet. The island's defences mainly consisted of several 122 mm and 76 mm anti-aircraft guns, captured from the Russians. The Romanian marine platoon defending the island was also equipped with two 45 mm coastal guns, two 37 mm anti-aircraft guns, and two anti-aircraft machine guns.

The first naval action took place on 23 June 1941 (one day after the Wehrmacht had begun the War against the Soviet Union), when the Soviet destroyer leader Kharkov together with the destroyers Bezposhchadny and Smyshlyonyi and several torpedo boats ran a patrol near the island, but found no Axis ships.

On 9 July 1941, the Soviet destroyer leader Tashkent together with four other destroyers (Bodry, Boiky, Bezuprechny, and Bezposhchadny) conducted a shipping sweep operation near the island, but did not make any contacts.

On 7 September 1941, two Soviet submarines of the Shchuka class (Shch-208 and Shch-213) and three of the M class (M-35, M-56, and M-62) conducted a patrol near the island.

On 29–30 October and 5 November 1942, the Romanian minelayers Amiral Murgescu and Dacia, together with the Romanian destroyers Regina Maria, Regele Ferdinand, the Romanian flotilla leader Mărăști, the Romanian gunboat Stihi and four German R boats laid two mine barrages around the island.

On 1 December 1942, while the Soviet cruiser Voroshilov together with the destroyer Soobrazitelny were bombarding the island with forty-six 180 mm and fifty-seven 100 mm shells, the cruiser was damaged by Romanian mines, but it managed to return to Poti for repairs under her own power. During the brief bombardment, she struck the radio station, barracks and lighthouse on the island, but failed to inflict significant losses.

On 11 December 1942, the Soviet submarine Shch-212 was sunk by a Romanian minefield near the island along with all of her crew of 44. The Soviet submarine M-31 was either sunk as well by the Romanian mine barrages near the island on 17 December, or sunk with depth charges by the Romanian flotilla leader Mărășești on 7 July 1943.

On 25 August 1943, two Romanian motorboats spotted a Soviet submarine near the island and attacked her with depth charges, but it managed to escape.

The Romanian marines were evacuated from the island and Soviet troops occupied it on 29–30 August 1944.

=== Post-WWII history ===
The Paris Peace Treaties of 1947 between the protagonists of World War II stipulated that Romania cede Northern Bukovina, the Hertsa region, Budjak, and Bessarabia to the Soviet Union, but made no mention of the mouths of the Danube and Snake Island.

Until 1948, Snake Island was a part of Romania. On 4 February 1948, during the delimitation of the frontier, Romania and the Soviet Union signed a protocol that left Snake Island and several islets on the Danube south of the 1917 Romanian-Russian border under Soviet administration. Romania disputed the validity of this protocol, since it was never ratified by either of the two countries; nevertheless it did not make any official claim on the territories.

The same year, in 1948, during the Cold War, a Soviet radar post was built on the isle (for both naval and anti-aircraft purposes).

The Soviet Union's possession of Snake Island was confirmed in the Treaty between the Government of the People's Republic of Romania and the Government of the Union of the Soviet Socialist Republics on the Romanian-Soviet State Border Regime, Collaboration and Mutual Assistance on Border Matters, signed in Bucharest on 27 February 1961.

Between 1967 and 1987, the USSR and Romanian side negotiated the delimitation of the continental shelf. The Romanian side refused to accept a Russian offer of 4,000 km^{2} (1,500 sq mi) out of 6,000 km^{2} (2,300 sq mi) around the island in 1987.

Following the collapse of the Soviet Union in 1991, Ukraine inherited control over the island. A number of Romanian parties and organizations consistently claimed it should be included in its territory. According to the Romanian side, in the peace treaties of 1918 and 1920 (after World War I), the isle was considered part of Romania, and it was not mentioned in the 1947 border-changing treaty between Romania and the Soviet Union.

In 1997, Romania and Ukraine signed a treaty in which both states "reaffirm that the existing border between them is inviolable and therefore, they shall refrain, now and in future, from any attempt against the border, as well as from any demand, or act of, seizure and usurpation of part or all the territory of the Contracting Party". However, both sides have agreed that if no resolution on maritime borders can be reached within two years, then either side can go to the International Court of Justice to seek a final ruling.

In 2007, the island's only settlement Bile was founded.

In 2008, twelve Ukrainian border guards died when their helicopter flying from Odesa to Snake Island crashed, killing all but one on board.

Until 18 July 2020, the island belonged to Kiliia Raion. The raion was abolished in July 2020 as part of the administrative reform of Ukraine, which reduced the number of raions of Odesa Oblast to seven. The area of Kiliia Raion was merged into Izmail Raion.

=== Russian invasion of Ukraine ===
Militarily, Snake Island, 35 kilometres (22 mi) from the coast of Ukraine, is within the range of missile, artillery, and drone strikes from the shore, and exposed to attacks from all directions from air and sea. It is a strategically significant island in the Black Sea, and Russian control over the island would allow a total blockade of the Ukrainian port city of Odesa.

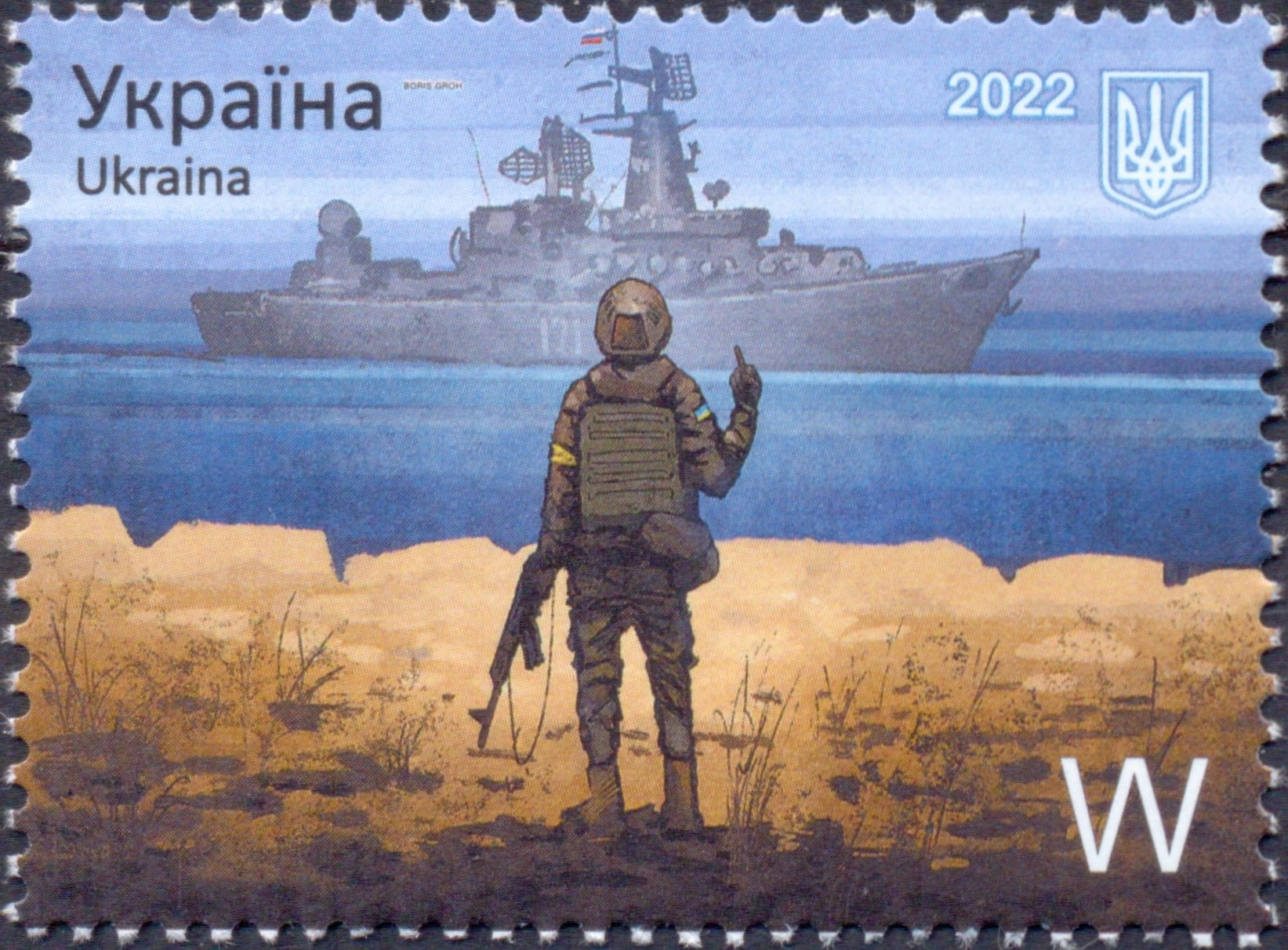
Ukrainian postage stamp, depicting a Ukrainian soldier giving Russian cruiser Moskva the finger

On 24 February 2022, on the first day of the Russian invasion of Ukraine, two Russian naval warships Vasily Bykov and Moskva, attacked Snake Island. Upon receiving a transmission from one of the Russian naval warships requesting surrender or else threatening bombardment, a Ukrainian border guard responded, "Russian warship, go fuck yourself." The response gained worldwide attention and became a symbol of Ukrainian resistance. Later on the same day, Russian forces landed and captured the island.

Initially, the Ukrainian government erroneously reported that all 13 members of the garrison had died in the attack, and President Volodymyr Zelenskyy "posthumously" awarded the Hero of Ukraine, Ukraine's highest award, to the 13 defenders. The Ukrainian navy clarified later in February that the garrison were alive. On 29 March 2022, the Defence Ministry of Ukraine posted on Twitter that the speaker of the phrase had been freed from captivity and given a medal for bravery. The Ukrainian Postal Service in April 2022 issued a stamp showing a Ukrainian soldier showing the finger (an offensive gesture of defiance) to the Russian ship Moskva.

Ukrainian forces launched an operation to expel the Russians from Snake Island, targeting exposed Russian positions in an over four month-long campaign. Ukrainian military sources said they carried out attacks on both the island proper and on any Russian vessels bringing troops and weapons to it. New Western weapons supplies to Ukraine were key to turning the tide of the campaign in Ukraine's favor, especially the HIMARS rocket system.

In late June 2022, Russian forces withdrew from the island in what the BBC referred to as both a symbolic and strategic victory for Ukraine. Ukrainian sources claimed the Russians fled in two speedboats after being unable to withstand Ukrainian strikes. Russia referred to the withdrawal as a "gesture of goodwill" after completing its military objectives on the island.

On 8 July 2023 President Zelenskyy visited the island to commemorate Ukrainian soldiers who defended it. On 13 July 2023 Russian forces dropped a single aerial bomb on the island.

== Maritime delimitation ==
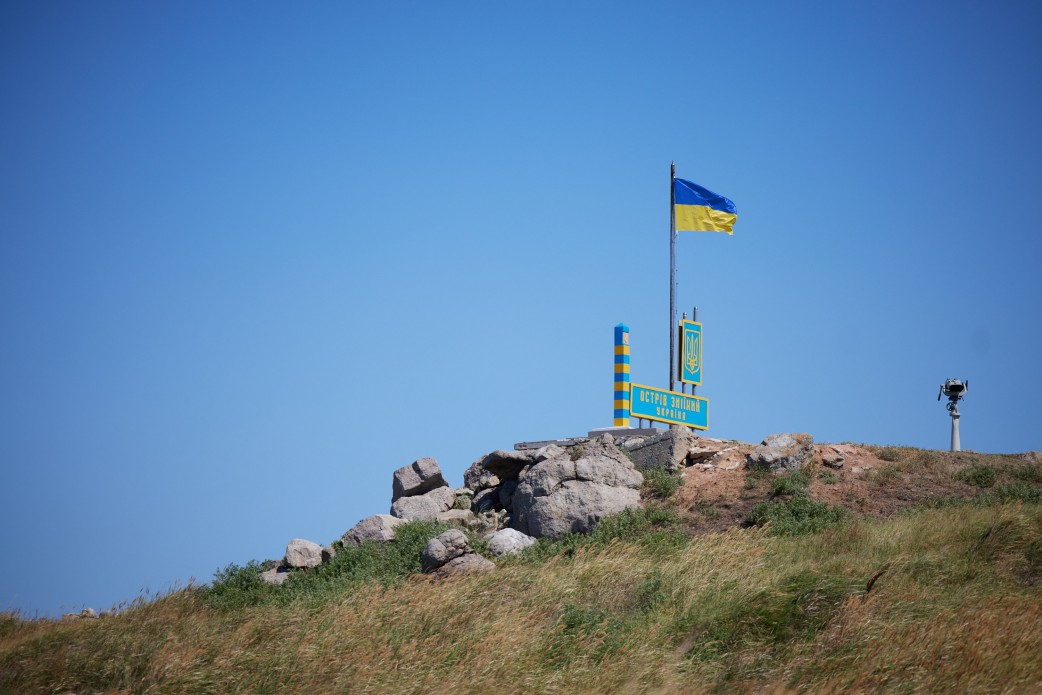
Snake Island with Ukrainian flag in August 2021

The status of Snake Island was important for delimitation of continental shelf and exclusive economic zones between Romania and Ukraine. If Snake Island were recognized as an island, then continental shelf around it should be considered as Ukrainian water. If Snake Island were not an island, but an islet, then in accordance with international law the maritime boundary between Romania and Ukraine should be drawn without taking into consideration the isle location.

On 4 July 2003, the President of Romania Ion Iliescu and the President of Russia Vladimir Putin signed a treaty about friendship and cooperation. Romania promised not to contest territories of Ukraine or Moldova, which it lost to the Soviet Union after World War II, but requested that Russia as a successor of the Soviet Union recognized in some form its responsibility for what had happened.

On 16 September 2004, the Romanian side brought a case against Ukraine to the International Court of Justice (ICJ) in a dispute concerning the maritime boundary between the two States in the Black Sea.

In 2007, Ukraine founded the small settlement of Bile on the island, which was criticized by Romania.

On 3 February 2009, the ICJ delivered its judgment, which divided the sea area of the Black Sea along a line which was between the claims of each country. The Court invoked the disproportionality test in adjudicating the dispute, noting that the ICJ, "as its jurisprudence has indicated, it may on occasion decide not to take account of very small islands or decide not to give them their full potential entitlement to maritime zones, should such an approach have a disproportionate effect on the delimitation line under consideration" and owing to a previous agreement between Ukraine and Romania, the island "should have no effect on the delimitation in this case, other than that stemming from the role of the 12-nautical-mile arc of its territorial sea" previously agreed between the parties.

== See also ==
- Bystroye Canal
- Filfla
- Maican Island
- Romania–Ukraine relations
- Soviet Navy surface raids on Western Black Sea
- Russian warship, go fuck yourself
- List of islands of Ukraine

== References and footnotes ==
=== General ===
- Korrespondent.net: December 2003 report on Snake Island dispute, including aerial picture of the isle (in Russian)
- Korrespondent.net: Maritime Delimitation as of August 2005 (in Russian)
- BBC Romanian report on the bank opening (in Romanian)
- Aurelian Teodorescu, "Snake Island: Between rule of law and rule of force": The Ostriv Zmiinyi dispute from the Romanian perspective (in Romanian)
- Constantine D. Kyriazis, Eternal Greece: Achilles' sanctuary
- Nicolae Densușianu, Dacia Preistorică, 1913, I.4; Literary references to the island in Antiquity
- Cotidianul: "OMV cauta petrol linga Insula Serpilor" (in Romanian)
- Olexandr Fomin, The history of Snake Island Lighthouse, Zerkalo Nedeli, 26 February 2000. (in Russian)
- Civic Media, Ukraine and Romania in strategic war in the Black Sea, Civic Media, October 2007. (in Romanian)
- Civic Media, The natural right of Romania over the Serpent Island, Civic Media, October 2007. (in Romanian)
