= Prorva Channel =

Partly canal and partly natural river branch in the Danube Delta, in Ukraine

Coordinates: 45°28′30″N 29°43′49″E

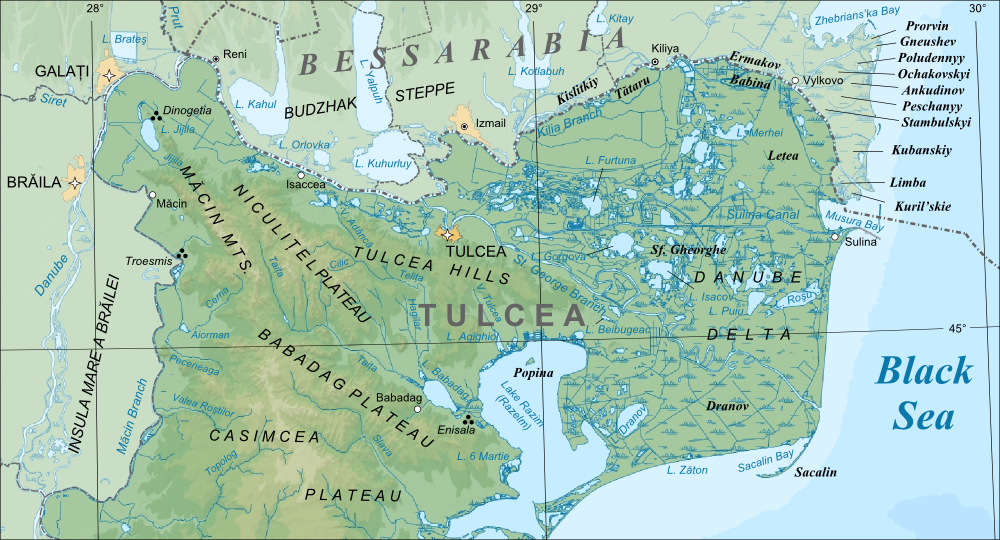
Danube Delta chart

The Prorva Channel, Prorva Canal, or Prorva branch is a channel in the Danube Delta, in Ukraine. It is partly a natural branch of the Danube Delta, and partly a canal constructed in 1957 by the Soviet Union.

According to an official report of the Ukrainian Ministry of Ecology, "Since 1958 the navigable waterway through the Prorva Branch had become the main channel for cargo transportation in the Ukrainian part of the Danube Delta", while the Bystroye Channel was reserved for military use until 1992 (and the Bystroye saw only occasional merchant traffic thereafter).

After the dissolution of the Soviet Union, the Prorva (alongside other Ukrainian waterways) became neglected, and transportation on it stopped around 1994-1997 due to silting, leaving Ukraine without its own deep-water canal between the Danube and the Black Sea. According to Ukrainian NGO International Centre for Policy Studies, dredging of the Prorva amounted to removing over 200,000 cubic meters annually after its opening, but by the mid-1980s that volume had increased twenty-fold.

Its reestablishment is among the suggestions to restore Ukrainian waterways, as an alternative to the controversial Bystroye Canal project.
