= Charles Goutzwiller =

French art historian and engraver

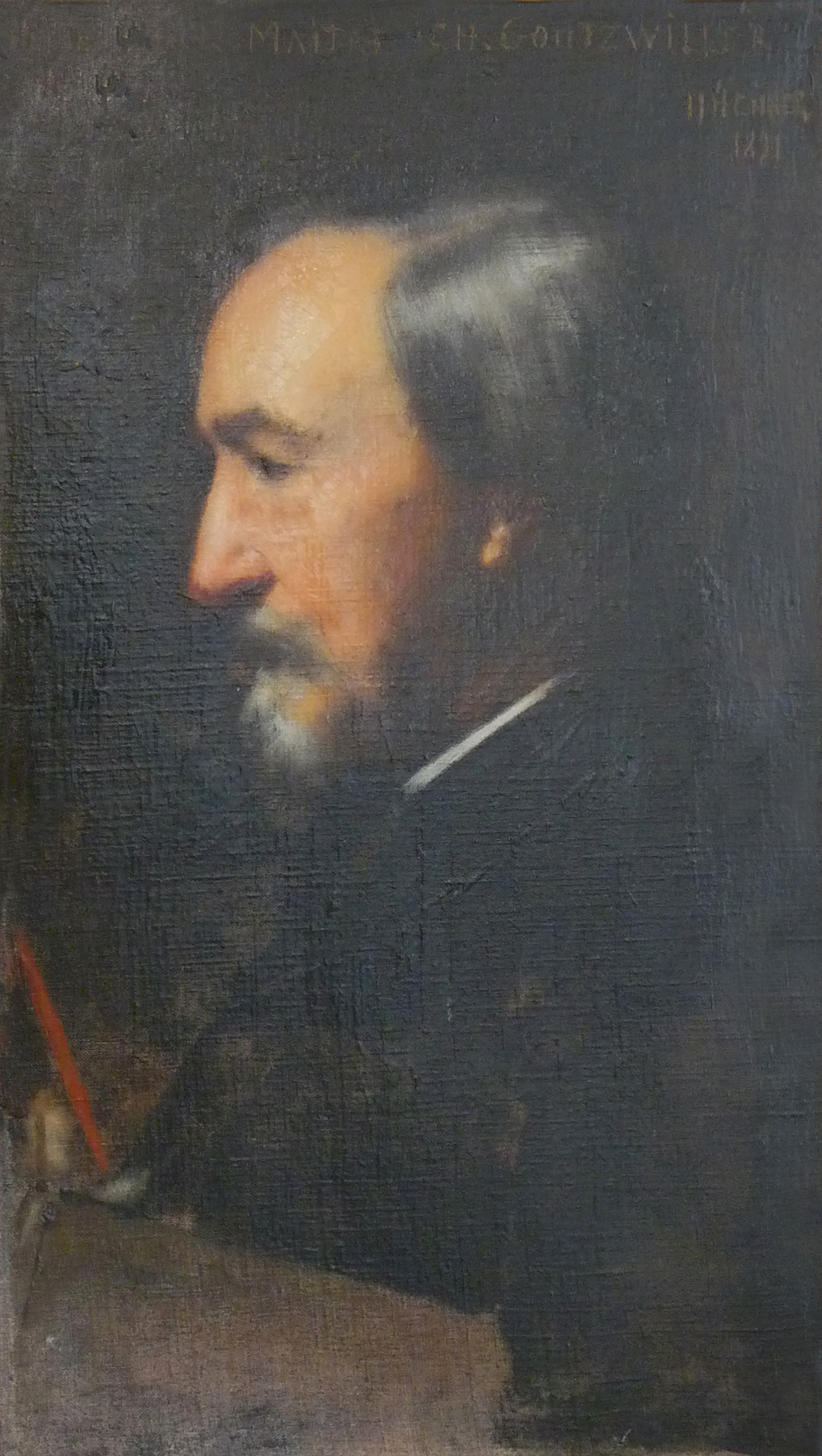
Charles Goutzwiller by Jean-Jacques Henner

Charles Antoine Adam Goutzwiller (September 3, 1819 – February 2, 1900) was a French art historian and engraver. At the Altkirch's college, he was the first professor of drawing of the painter Jean-Jacques Henner, who executed his portrait in 1891.

== Publications ==
- « X. Hommaire de Hell. Étude biographique », in Revue d'Alsace, Colmar, 1860 (p. 337, 385, 469 et 529) et 1861 (p. 69 et 145)
- Le Musée de Colmar : Notice sur les peintures de Martin Schongauer et de divers artistes des anciennes écoles allemandes, C. Decker, Colmar, 1867, 80 p.
- Le Comté de Ferrette : esquisses historiques, 1868 (domaine publique disponible en téléchargement libre :https://archive.org/details/LeComtDeFerrette)
- Curiosités alsaciennes. Les vases de Ribeauvillé, Impr. de Vve L. L. Bader, Mulhouse, 1872, 28 p.
- « Le retable de Luemschwiller », in Revue alsacienne, 1886, no. 6
- Souvenirs d'Alsace, portraits, paysages : à travers le passé, Impr. nouvelle, Belfort, 1898, 475 p., at Gallica

== Gallery ==
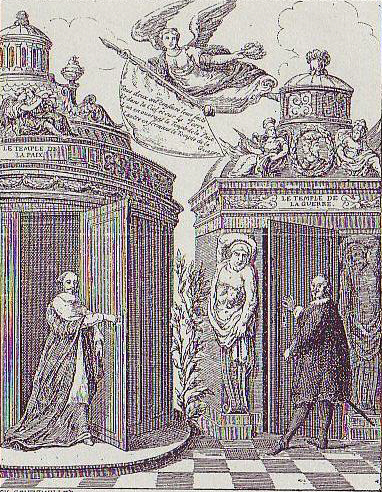

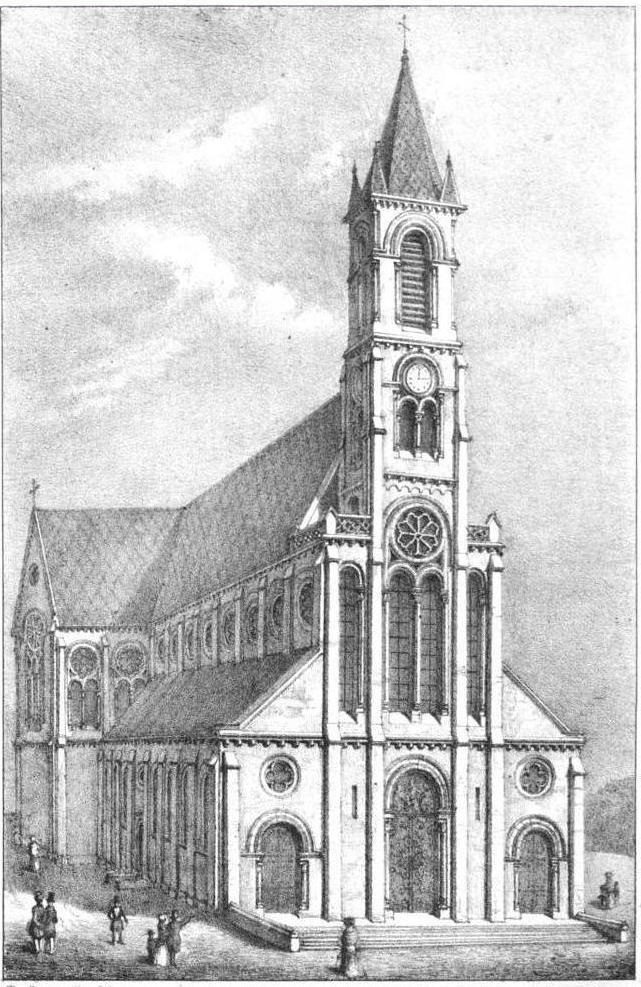

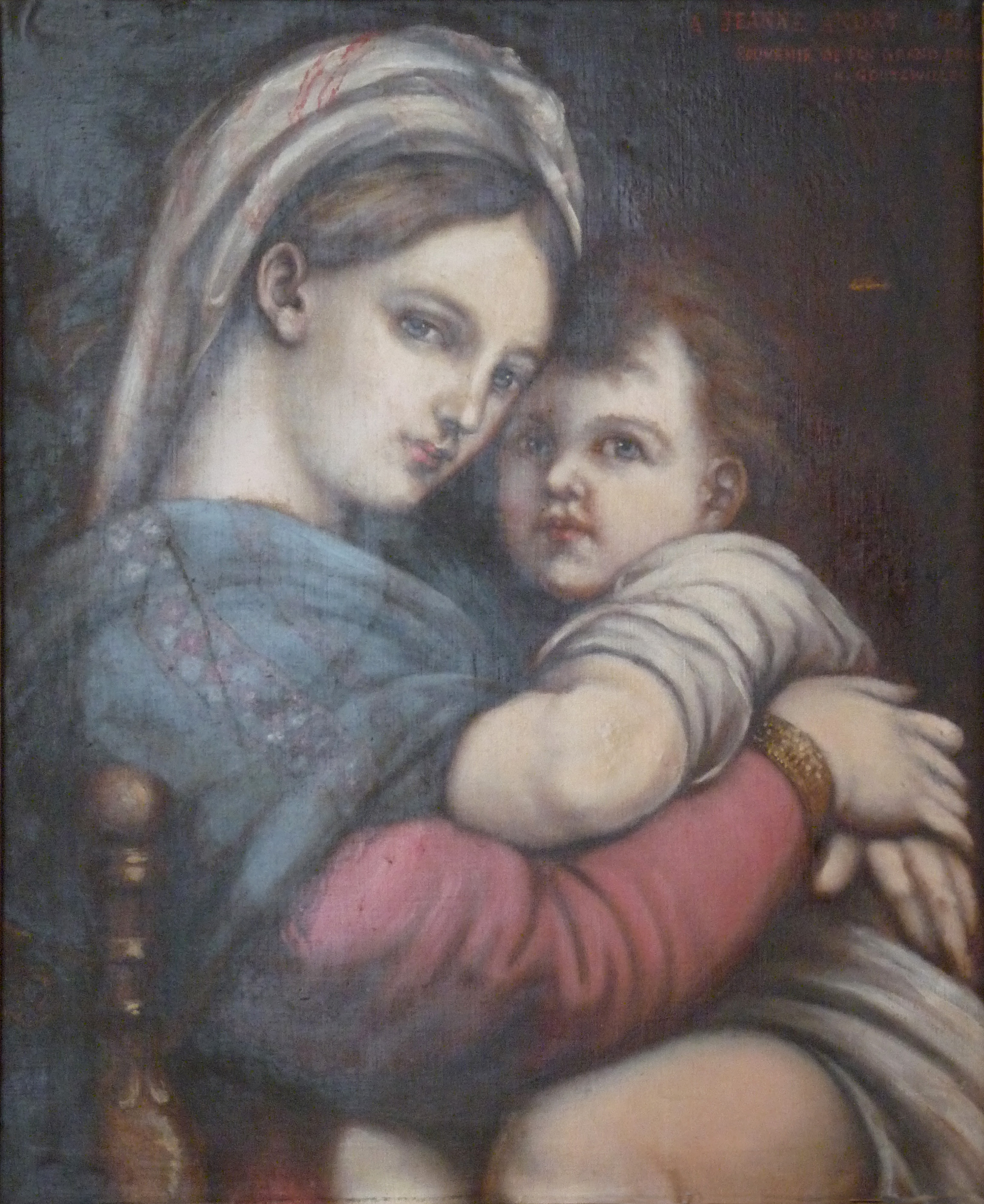

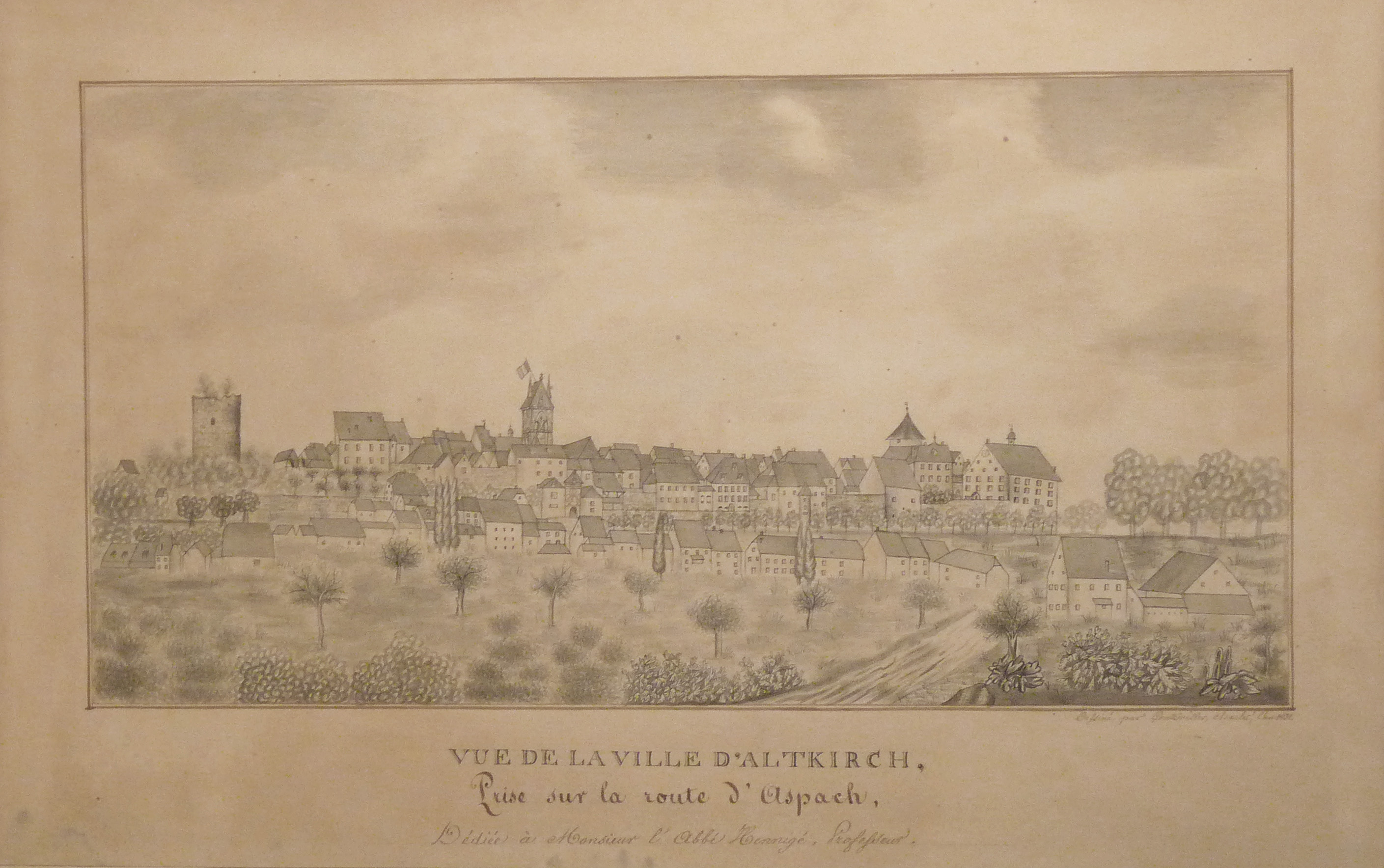

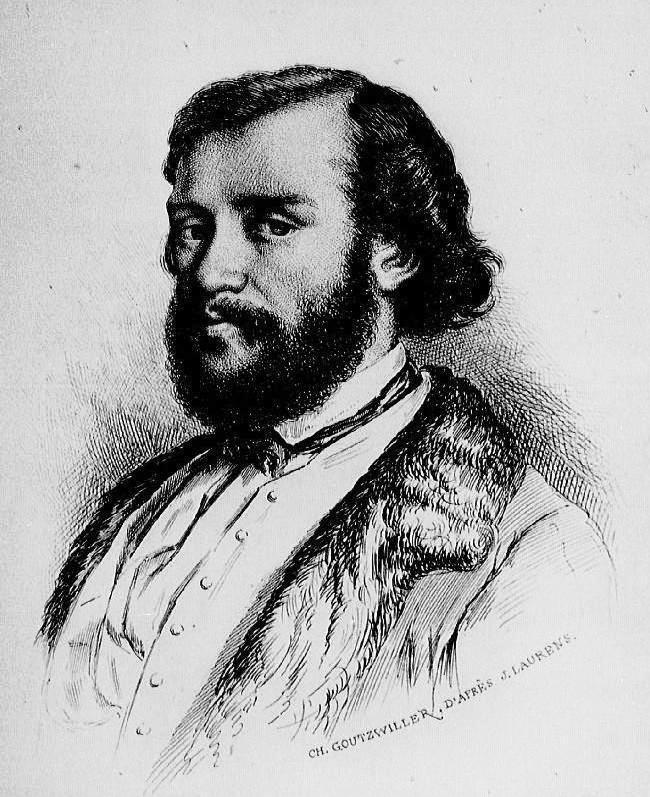
