= Racecourse of Achilles =

The Racecourse of Achilles (Ancient Greek: Αχίλλειος δρόμος) is a narrow strip of land north-west of Crimea and south of the mouth of the Dnieper in Ukraine, running nearly due west and east. It is now divided into two parts called Tendra Spit and Dzharylhach.

According to ancient legends Achilles pursued Iphigenia to this peninsula and there practised for his races. The land was called Racecourse of Achilles because the hero celebrated his victory there with competitive games and also there he and his men routinely exercised when there was a respite from the fighting.

Herodotus briefly mentions a "racetrack of Achilles" in the fourth book of the Histories (4.55) while he describes the history and geography of the Black Sea region controlled by the Scythians. He describes it as laying nearby the River Hypacyris, known today as the Southern Bug River.

The Leuke island in the Black Sea, modern Snake island, was also called racecourse of Achilles.
