= Autoleon =

Ancient Greek mythological figure

In Greek mythology, Autoleon (Ancient Greek: Αὐτολέων) was a hero of Croton in Magna Graecia, of which the following story is told. Pausanias relates precisely the same story of one Leonymus (Ancient Greek: Λεώνυμος).

It was customary with the Opuntian Locrians, whenever they drew up their army in battle array, to leave one place in the lines open for their national hero Ajax. Once in a battle between the Locrians and Crotonians in Italy, Autoleon wanted to penetrate into this vacant place, hoping thus to conquer the Locrians. But the shade of Ajax appeared and inflicted on Autoleon a wound from which he suffered severely. The oracle advised him to conciliate the shade of Ajax by offering sacrifices to him in the island of Leuce. This was done accordingly, and Autoleon was cured.

While in the island of Leuce, Autoleon also saw Helen, who gave him a commission to Stesichorus. This poet had censured Helen in one of his poems and had become blind in consequence. Helen now sent him the message, that if he would recant, his sight should be restored to him. Stesichorus composed a poem in praise of Helen and recovered his sight.
