= Bystroye Canal =

Canal in the Danube Delta

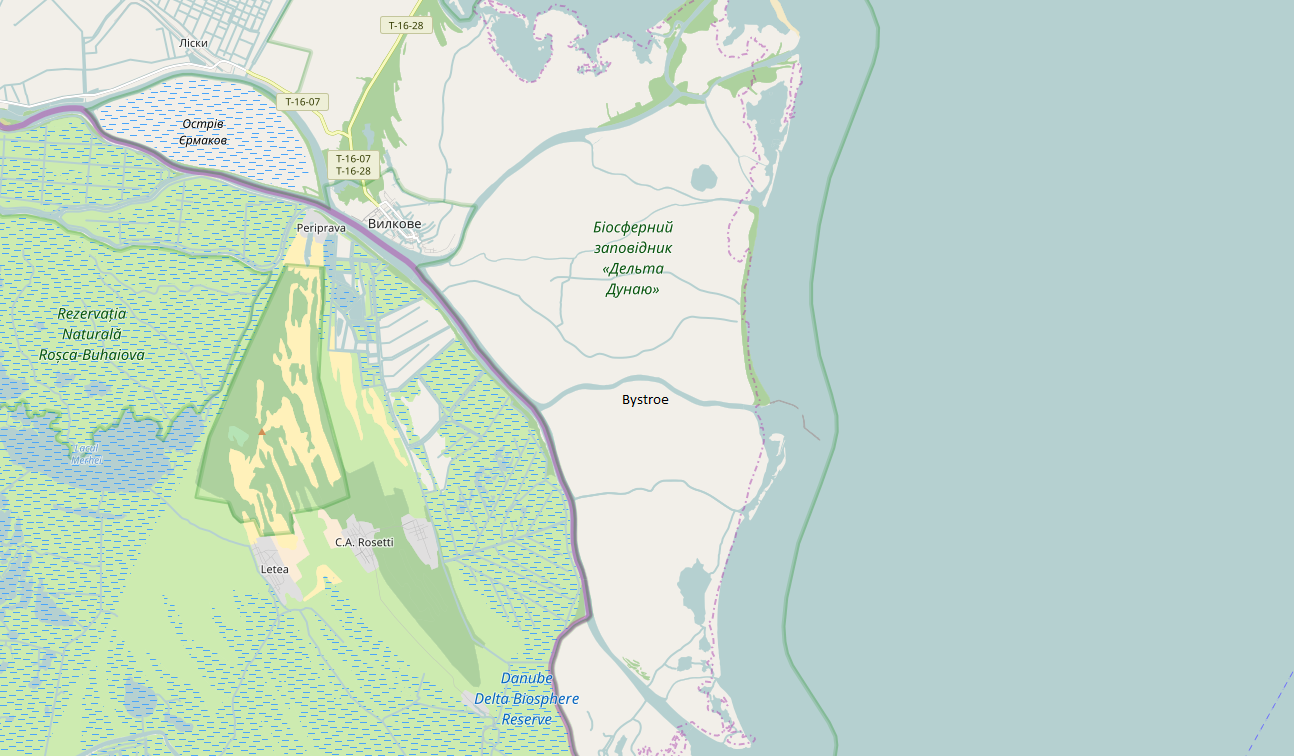
- Map of the canal
- Interactive map of Bystroye Canal
- Country: Ukraine

Geography
- Direction: East
- Start point: Danube
- End point: Black Sea
- Beginning coordinates: 45°20′24″N 29°39′19″E
- Ending coordinates: 45°20′18″N 29°45′49″E

The Deepwater Navigation Course "Danube – Black Sea" (Ukrainian: ГСХ «Дунай — Чорне море») is a deep-water canal in the Danube Delta that runs through the Danube Delta distributaries Chilia, Old Istambul and Bystre. Through most of its length it coincides with the Romania-Ukraine border that stretches along Danube. The canal is served by the Ukrainian state company Ukrainian Sea Ports Authority and its piloting services branch Delta Lotsman. A portion of the canal, Bystroe, which stretches through the territory of Ukraine rather than along the main course raised concerns in Romania which emphasized ecological issues as it stretches through the Ukrainian "Danube Delta" Biosphere Reserve.

== Description ==
Originally the distributary (Bystroe or Bystre) of Danube Delta was among the main Soviet (and Soviet Ukraine) waterways until 1959, when its exploitation stopped due to silting that occurred after Romanian authorities on a political initiative created own Danube – Black Sea Canal away from the border with the Soviet Union.

After the Prorva distributary became silted in 1997, Ukraine was left without its own deep-water canal between the Danube and the Black Sea. According to the Ukrainian NGO International Centre for Policy Studies, the use of Romanian Sulina distributary costs Ukraine ₴0.7-1.2 million annually.

There was a project proposed by Ukraine to reopen its navigation. According to official Ukrainian plans, it was to be completed in 2008. The intent was to provide a deep-water route from the Danube to the Black Sea under Ukrainian control, in order to reduce ship transit costs and provide an alternate route to Romania.

Initial dredging started in 2004 and the canal was declared open on May 10, 2007, for ships not exceeding 4.5 meters in draft.

=== Safety ===
Along the whole course of the Ukrainian deepwater shipping course there established modern systems of navigation and shipping safety. Navigational equipment of the sea shipping courses corresponds to the system of the International Association of Marine Aids to Navigation and Lighthouse Authorities (IALA), region A; and the Basic provisions on navigation along Danube.

The shipping safety is provided by marine pilots and other piloting services of the Ukrainian state company Delta Lotsman. Navigational services are provided with modern specialized ships, GPS coastal stations, AIS coastal navigation as well as radar automated posts.

All objects are integrated into one regional system of ship traffic management "Dunai" which provides not only ship traffic safety, but also greatly improves efficiency of ship traffic. The traffic participants are presented with operational meteorological and hydrological information, traffic status information, factors that might complicate shipping, etc. According to the Ministerial order #132 of 24 May 2005 for navigation and hydrographic provision of Danube shipping safety is responsible the state company "Derzhhidrohrafiya".

The pilot project provides a traffic speed limit of ships along the sea access canal and Bystroe distributary 7 knots. At the other sites of shipping course the speed is regulated by local rules of shipping. It is recommended to limit the approach of vessels to sea access canal at wind speeds of over 15 meters per second and a wave height of 2 meters.

== Dispute between Romania and Ukraine ==
Ecologists, including the World Wildlife Fund, have raised significant concerns about damage to the Danube Delta ecosystem. An inquiry commission established under the auspices of the Convention on Environmental Impact Assessment in a Transboundary Context (of which Romania and Ukraine are both signatories) unanimously decided that the canal would have a significant adverse ecological impact.

In 2004 the European Commission issued a "Statement on Opening of Bystroye Canal in Ukraine" saying that "The European Commission deeply regrets the reported opening to navigation of the initial part of the Bystroye canal between the River Danube and the Black Sea. The canal route goes through a specially protected UNESCO World Heritage area in the Danube Delta which is also subject to the international Ramsar Convention on the protection of wetlands." The Ukrainian NGO International Centre for Policy Studies also protested the decision of the Ukrainian government, writing that "in its desire to get the canal as soon as possible, the Cabinet of Ministers of Ukraine did not pay proper attention to considering all the alternatives, and approved an unjustified decision that violates Ukraine’s environmental interests and will heap greater expenditures upon the budget than those intended to be reduced by the building of the canal".

After the apparent failure of diplomatic efforts, the government of Romania, where most of the Danube Delta lies, is reportedly considering building a 20 km canal that would absorb the Danube's water upstream of Ukraine's small piece of the river, in order to render the planned Bastroye Channel useless and thereby discourage Ukraine from attempting such a project. The Romanian canal would be designed so that it could be shut at any time, returning the river more or less to its current state.

The Danube Delta has been a UNESCO World Heritage Site since 1991. The European Union has repeatedly asked Ukraine to halt the project, as have Romania and the United States. The Worldwide Fund for Nature has said the canal threatens the delta's most important wetland, where 70 percent of the world's white pelicans and 50 percent of pygmy cormorants live.

The official inauguration of the project was scheduled for Ukrainian Independence Day August 24, 2004, but was postponed until August 26. On August 24, around 140 non-profit organisations and trade unions submitted an open letter at the Ukrainian embassy in Bucharest, Romania saying the project may endanger more than 280 bird species and 45 freshwater fish species living in the delta. "If Ukraine goes ahead with its plan ... the delta will become a fetid swamp," said a statement by one of the unions. On August 26 Ukraine officially inaugurated the project and the Romanian government announced plans to bring a lawsuit against Ukraine at The Hague-based International Court of Justice, invoking the Ramsar Convention on wetlands.

In May 2005, parties of the Aarhus Convention agreed on political sanctions against Ukraine. Ukraine announced the temporary halt of the project in June, 2005. In February 2006 "The Conference for the Sustainable Development of the Danube Delta" was held in Odesa with participation of Romania, Moldova and Ukraine and involved international organizations, work on the channel is still planned in accordance with international conventions.

In 2023, after 20 years of dispute, Romania and Ukraine reached an agreement according to which Romania would not object to Ukraine's expansion of the canal as long as the project complied with environmental protection provisions.

== See also ==
- Romania–Ukraine relations
- Maican Island
- Maritime delimitation between Romania and Ukraine
