= Romania–Ukraine relations =

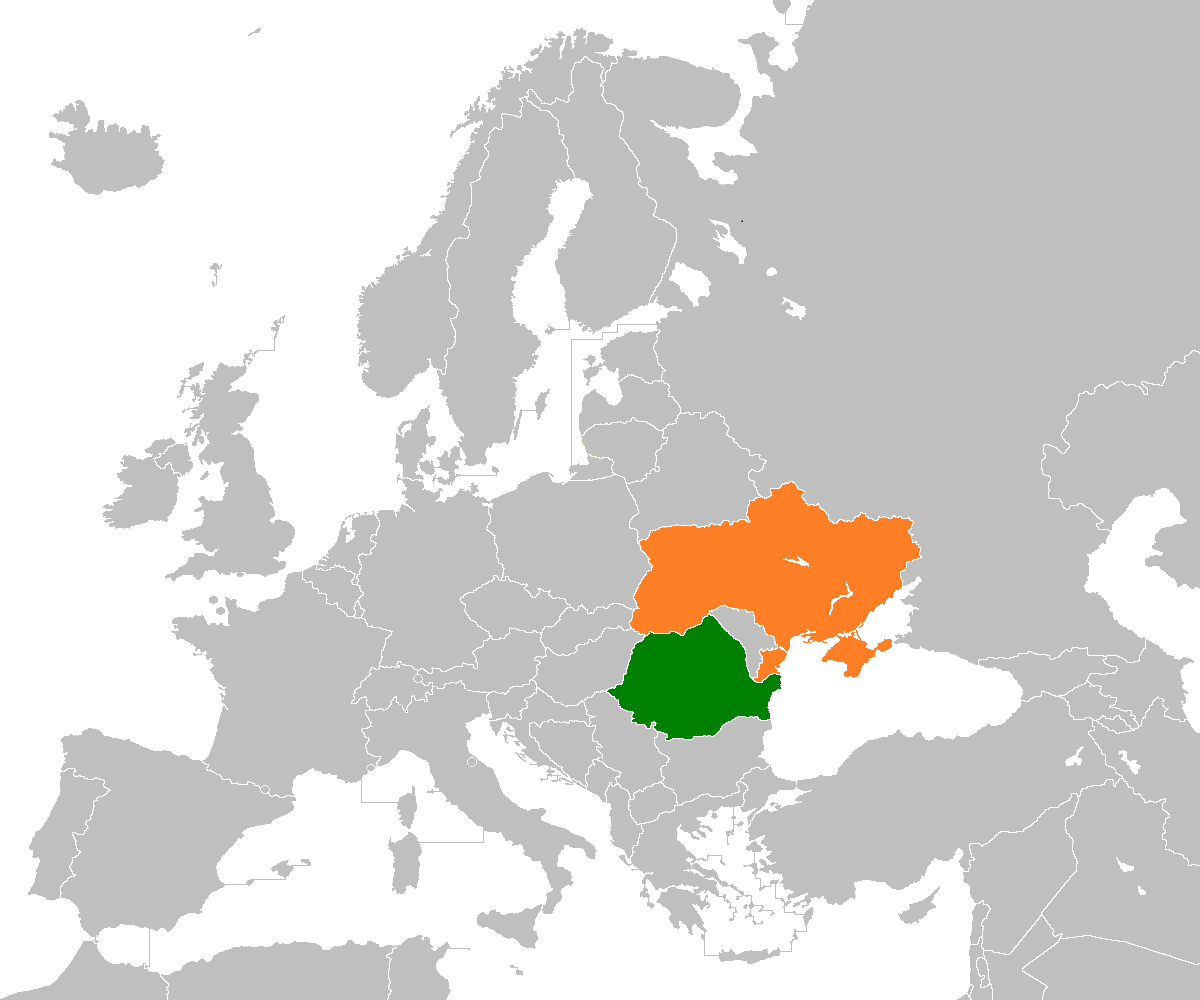
- Romania: Ukraine

Romania–Ukraine relations are foreign relations between Romania and Ukraine. Diplomatic relations between both countries were established on 9 February 1918 and re-established in 1992.

== Disputes ==
Romania and Ukraine had been negotiating a broad treaty of friendship and cooperation for several years, but disagreement over ownership of the Snake Island and more importantly the oil and gas reserves that are thought to lie beneath its area of the Black Sea, as well as the northern border of Romania with Ukraine, had kept the sides apart. In June 1997, Romania signed a bilateral treaty with Ukraine that, among other concerned, resolved territorial and minority issues that had impeded the development of improved relations between the two countries:

- The dispute between Romania and Ukraine over borders near the Snake Island (approx 50 km east of Sulina) and its continental shelf of the Black Sea under which significant gas and oil deposits may exist, has been resolved after the 2009 ruling of the International Court of Justice.
- The dispute between Romania and Ukraine over the construction of the Bystroye Canal.
- Issues regarding the Romanian minority in Ukraine (including self-declared Moldovans)

== History ==
As written by Ion Bistreanu, a former Romanian ambassador to Ukraine, in his memoirs, a 1994 public opinion poll in Ukraine on which countries posed the greatest threat to the independence and territorial integrity of Ukraine placed Romania second, only behind Russia.

The status of Snake Island was important for the Maritime Delimitation in the Black Sea case for the delimitation of continental shelf and exclusive economic zones between the two countries. If Snake Island were recognized as an island, then continental shelf around it should be considered as Ukrainian water. If Snake Island were not an island, but a rock, then in accordance with international law the maritime boundary between Romania and Ukraine should be drawn without taking into consideration the isle location.

On 4 July 2003 the President of Romania Ion Iliescu and the President of Russia Vladimir Putin signed a treaty about friendship and cooperation. Romania promised not to contest territories of Ukraine or Moldova, which it lost to Soviet Union after World War II, but requested that Russia as a successor of the Soviet Union recognized in some form its responsibility for what had happened. On 16 September 2004 the Romanian side brought a case against Ukraine to the International Court of Justice (ICJ) in a dispute concerning the maritime boundary between the two States in the Black Sea. On 2007, Ukraine founded the small settlement of Bile on the island, which was criticized by Romania.

On February 3, 2009, the ICJ delivered its judgment, which divided the sea area of the Black Sea along a line which was between the claims of each country. The Court invoked the disproportionality test in adjudicating the dispute, noting that the ICJ, "as its jurisprudence has indicated, it may on occasion decide not to take account of very small islands or decide not to give them their full potential entitlement to maritime zones, should such an approach have a disproportionate effect on the delimitation line under consideration" and owing to a previous agreement between Ukraine and Romania, the island "should have no effect on the delimitation in this case, other than that stemming from the role of the 12-nautical-mile arc of its territorial sea" previously agreed between the parties.

In 2009, Yuriy Yekhanurov, the Minister of Defence of Ukraine, named Romania and Russia as Ukraine's likeliest adversaries, as they would have territorial claims against the country as he asserted.

On 5 September 2020, the Minister of National Defense of Romania Nicolae Ciucă and the Minister of Defense of Ukraine Andriy Taran signed an agreement for technical and military cooperation between the two countries. That year, it was announced that Romania would open a consulate for Ukraine in Sighetu Marmației.

On 4 April 2022, amid the 2022 Russian invasion of Ukraine, Zelenskyy gave a speech to the Parliament of Romania. Later, on 26 April, a group of Romanian officials visited Kyiv, promising more cooperation between Romania and Ukraine. After this, a Russian hacking group started a campaign of cyberattacks against Romanian government and other official websites.

On 19 April 2022 Romania announced a planned reform to the government decree that regulates the export of military weapons and national defence products in order to provide these weapons not only to NATO allies but also to Ukraine. The Ministry of Defense developed the draft decree which states that the reason behind this decision is Russia's aggression against Ukraine.

On 3 December 2025, the Verkhovna Rada, the parliament of Ukraine, approved a bill excluding "Moldovan" and Russian from Ukraine's list of languages protected in accordance with the European Charter for Regional or Minority Languages (ECRML). Ukrainian parliament member Yevheniia Kravchuk stated "We are correcting a historical inaccuracy. Instead of the artificial 'Moldovan' language, we are consecrating the Romanian language, just as it is recognized in Moldova itself." Volodymyr Zelenskyy, then President of Ukraine, signed the document on 12 June 2026, and it entered into force on 13 June.

On 22 January 2026, Chamber of Deputies of Romania member Petru Gabriel Negrea, of the party Alliance for the Union of Romanians (AUR) and a businessman who had offered support to Ukrainian refugees, announced he had been banned from entering Ukraine, stating he had been verbally told he was considered an "enemy of the Ukrainian people" by Ukrainian border authorities and that he had been detained "in degrading conditions and physically pushed across the border"; he attributed this treatment to his public defense of the rights of the Romanian minority in Ukraine.

On 12 March 2026, Zelenskyy signed a decree formally establishing the Romanian Language Day as a holiday in Ukraine every 31 August. This was done for the "development of reciprocal understanding and reciprocal respect, as well as cooperation in Ukrainian–Romanian relations". At the time, the Ukrainian Language Day was celebrated in Romania every 9 November. Additionally, on 8 May that year, Ukraine included Romania together with 27 other named countries in its list of countries whose citizens could hold dual citizenship. Ukraine's previous law regarding citizenship had been a point of dissatisfaction for the Romanian minority of the country. With this move, ethnic Ukrainians from Romania would be able to use a simplified procedure to become citizens of Ukraine. Moldova was also included later on the list as it was formally announced on 26 June that year.

== Resident diplomatic missions ==
- Romania has an embassy in Kyiv and consulates-general in Chernivtsi and Odesa and a consulate in Solotvyno.
- Ukraine has an embassy in Bucharest.
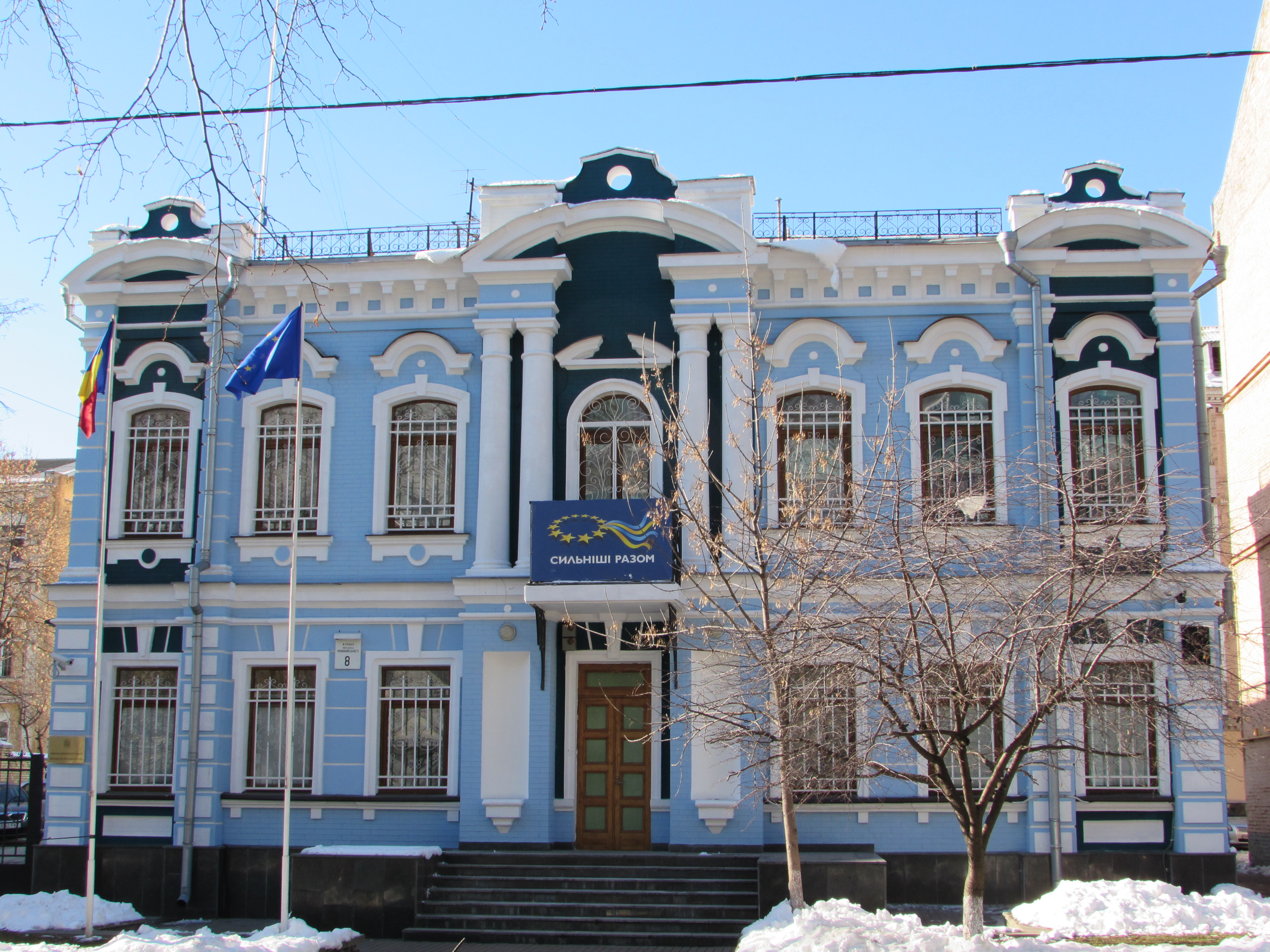
Embassy of Romania in Kyiv

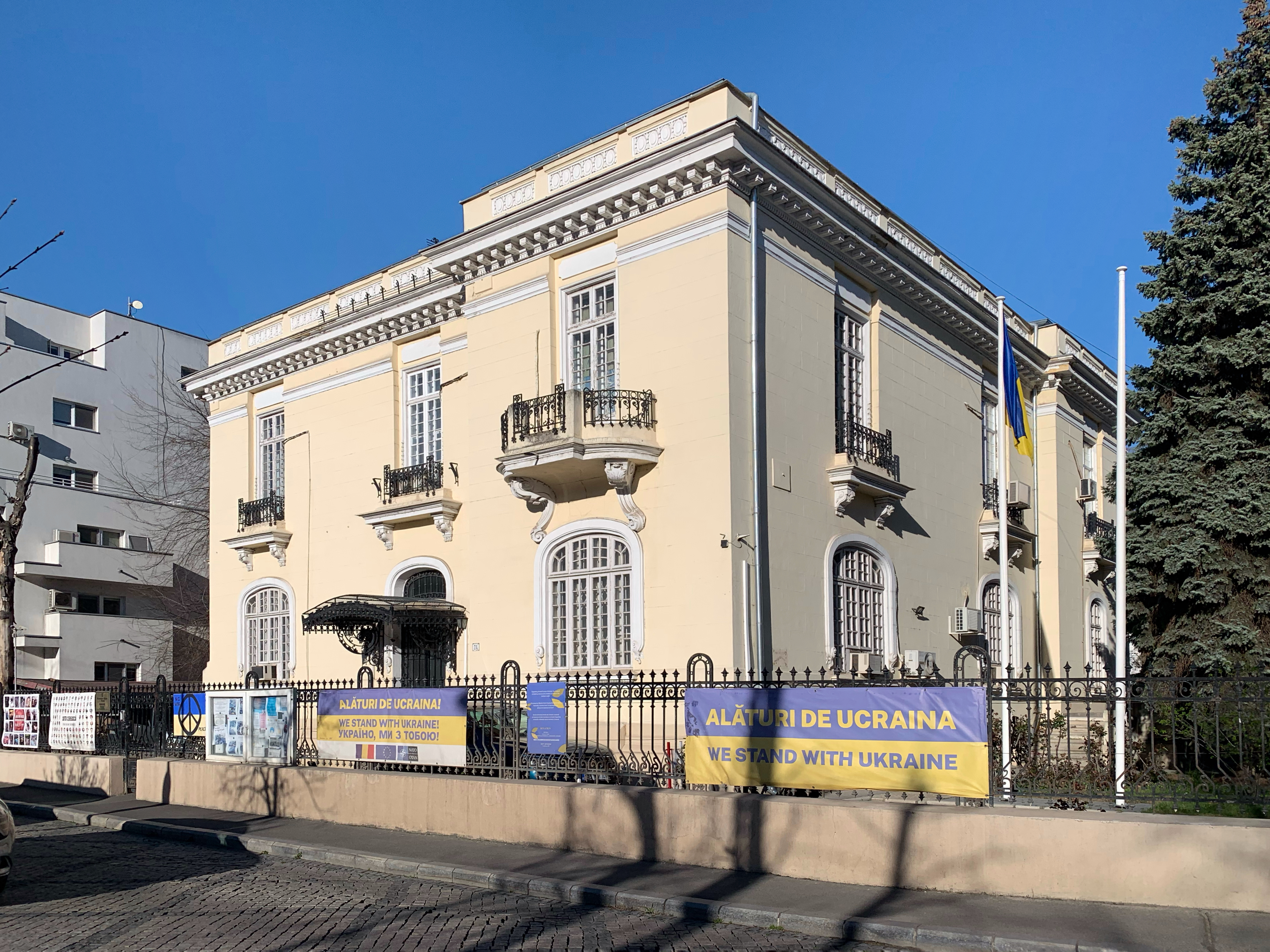
Embassy of Ukraine in Bucharest

== See also ==
- Romanian Orthodox Church in Ukraine
- Romania–Ukraine border
- Foreign relations of Romania
- Foreign relations of Ukraine
- Romanians in Ukraine
- Ukrainians of Romania
- Ukraine–European Union relations
- Accession of Ukraine to the European Union
- Odesa Triangle
