= Jules Laurens =

French artist (1825–1901)

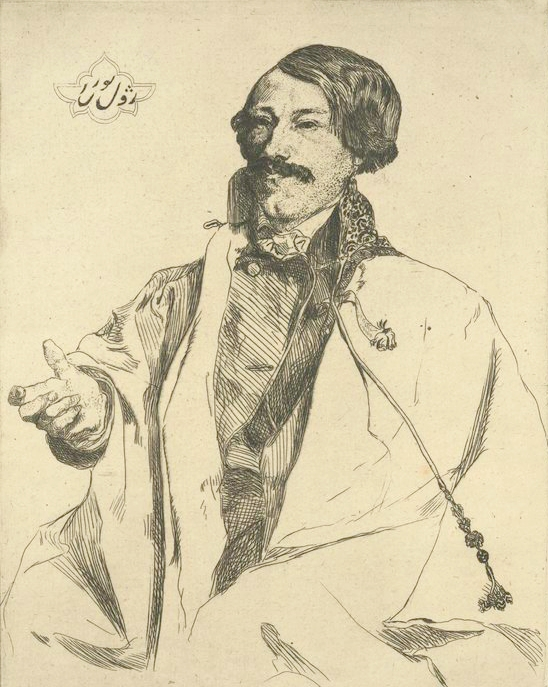
- Jules Laurens by Félix Bracquemond
- Born: 26 July 1825; Carpentras, France
- Died: 5 May 1901 (aged 75); Saint-Didier, Vaucluse
- Education: École des Beaux-Arts
- Known for: Painter, lithographer and author
- Movement: Orientalist

Jules Joseph Augustin Laurens, commonly known as Jules Laurens, (26 July 1825, Carpentras - 5 May 1901, Saint-Didier, Vaucluse) was a French artist in drawing, painting, and lithography who is remembered above all for his Oriental works.

== Early life ==
One of a family of five, at the age of 12 he went to live with his brother, Jean-Joseph (1801–1890) in Montpellier where he attended the city's art college while benefitting from his brother's artistic contacts. He went on to Paris, studying under Paul Delaroche at the École des Beaux-Arts, first exhibiting in 1840 and completing his studies in 1846.

== Career ==
Laurens was chosen by the geographer Xavier Hommaire de Hell to join him on an extended scientific journey to Turkey and Iran (1846-1848). During this time, Laurens made over a thousand drawings of the sites, costumes and people he encountered on his travels. They included many portraits of Iranian personalities. His biography "Nazar-Andaz" gives an account of de Hell's death at Isfahan in August 1848. Thanks to the French ambassador, Laurens was able to reach Tehran from where he sent back de Hell's notes together with his own drawings. Hundreds of them were presented in the Atlas historique et scientifique, the fourth volume of the Voyage en Turquie et en Perse published by de Hell's wife. Some of Laurens' lithographs were published in L'Illustration and Tour du Monde, both popular periodicals, while the originals, together with his early watercolours were given to the library of the École des Beaux-Arts. Laurens also painted examples of Qajar art while in Iran, including his Danseuse au tambourin.

Laurens continued his career in France after returning in 1849, exhibiting paintings and engravings in virtually every Salon from 1850 to 1891. He was also active in literary circles where he met many celebrities. His La Légende des ateliers, published in his later days, contains anecdotes of his travels.

== Works ==
- Les rochers de Vann, Musée d’Orsay
- Campagne de Téhéran, Avignon
- L’hiver en Perse, Bagnères
- Ruines de palais persan, Carpentras
- La mosquée bleue à Tauris, Montpellier
- Village fortifié dans le Khorassan, Toulon
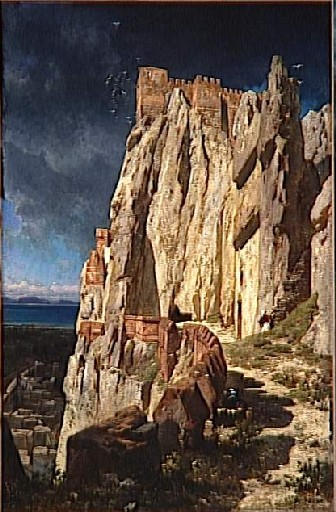
Les rochers de Vann

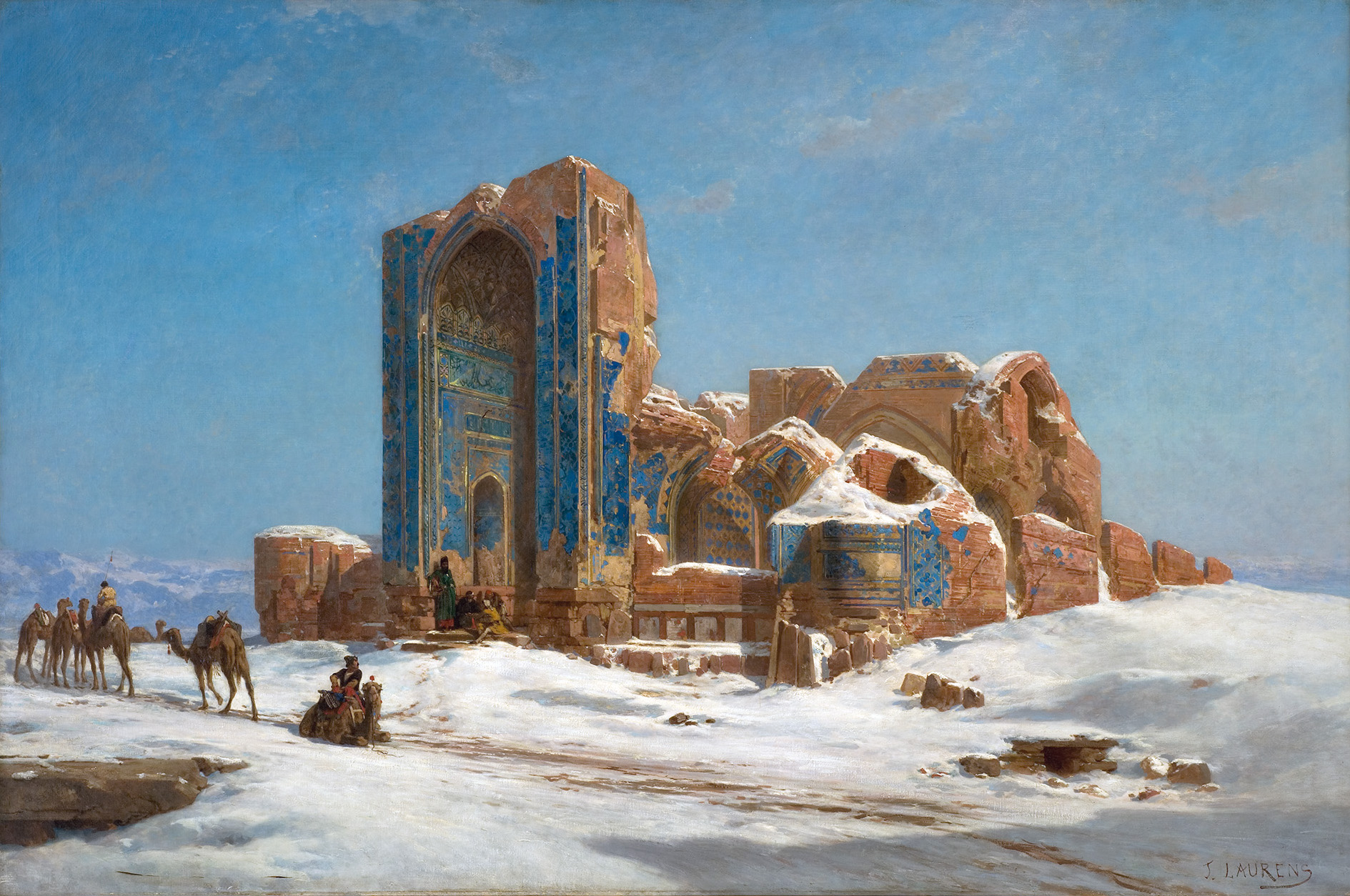
La Mosquée bleue à Tauris

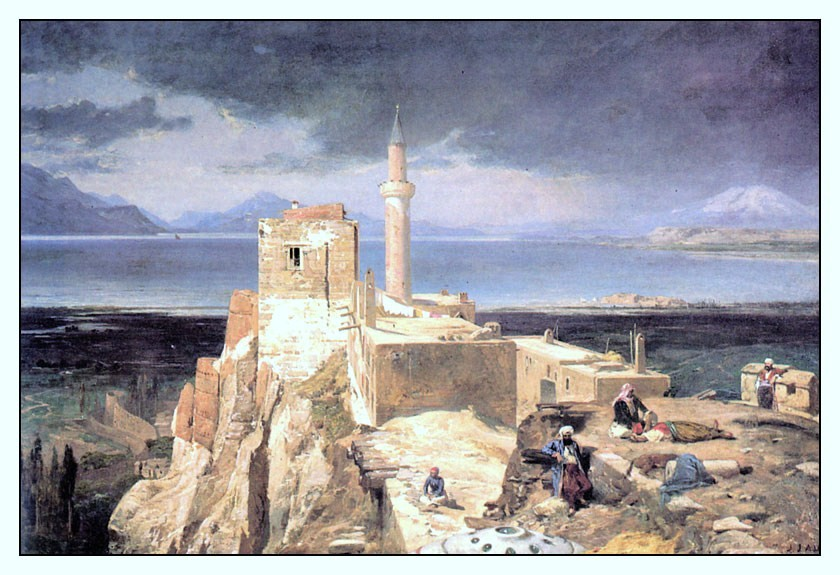
Lac et la forteresse de Van en Arménie

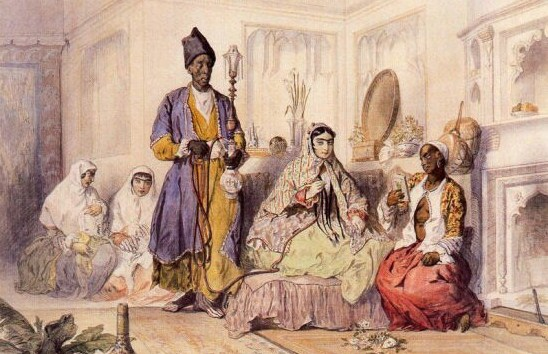
Dans un harem de Téhéran

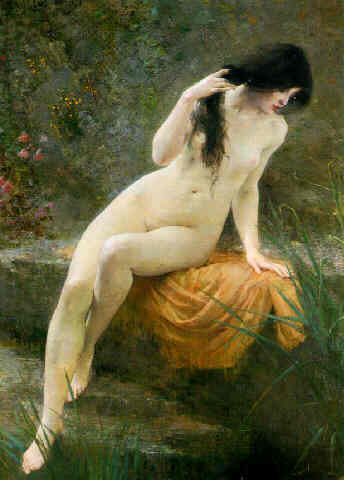
La Baigneuse
