= Romanian Language Day =

Holiday about the Romanian language

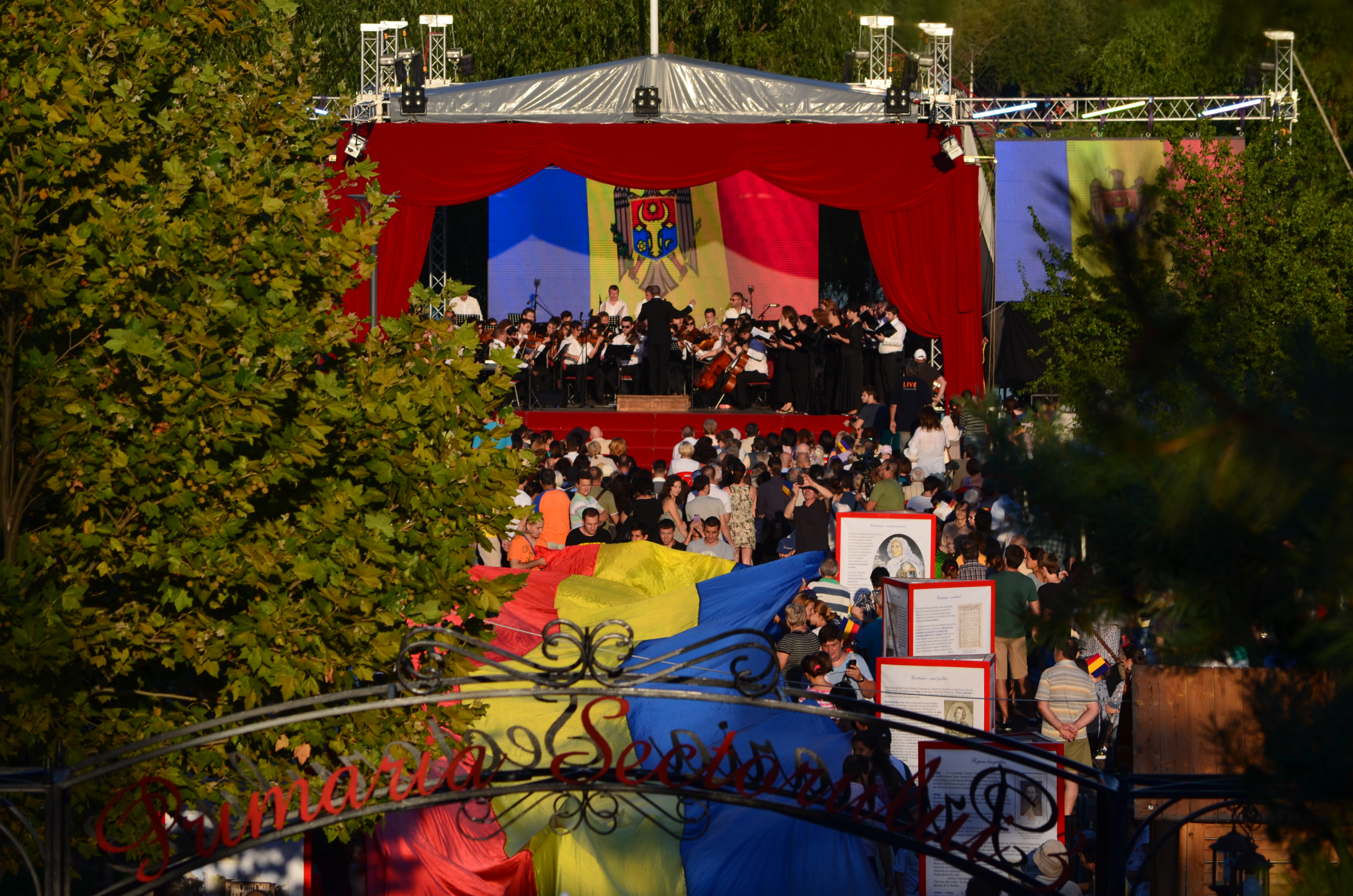
- Romanian Language Day in Bucharest, Romania, in 2014
- Observed by: Romania, Moldova, Ukraine
- Type: National
- Celebrations: Cultural and educational events
- Date: 31 August
- Next time: 31 August 2027
- Frequency: annual

The Romanian Language Day (Romanian: Ziua Limbii Române, Romanian pronunciation: [ˈziwa ˈlimbij roˈmɨne]; Ukrainian: День румунської мови, romanized: Den rumunskoyi movy) is a holiday in Romania, Moldova and Ukraine celebrated every 31 August for the Romanian language. Romanian is a Romance language, being part of the same linguistic family as the French, Italian, Portuguese and Spanish languages.

The holiday was first proposed in Romania in 2011, when MPs of the Romanian Parliament from all political parties submitted a request to the Senate to make 31 August the "Romanian Language Day". Earlier, in the same year, organizations and associations of Romanians in Bulgaria, Hungary, Serbia and Ukraine had already declared 31 August as such, starting to celebrate it in 2012 and asking the Romanian state to also recognize the holiday. The Senate approved it on 6 December 2011, while the Chamber of Deputies accepted it on 19 February 2013. Romanian President Traian Băsescu promulgated the holiday on 13 March 2013, which was published in the Monitorul Oficial six days later. According to the law that accepted the holiday, Law No. 53/2013, it can be celebrated by national public authorities and foreign diplomatic missions, which may organize cultural and educational events of a scientific or "evocative" character.

A holiday celebrating the Romanian language had originally been enacted on 23 June 1990 in Moldova. It was named "Limba noastră cea română" ("Our Romanian Language"), but this was changed in 1994 to simply "Limba noastră" ("Our Language"). On 2 March 2023, the Parliament of Moldova voted in a law that renamed the holiday, now being known in the country as the Romanian Language Day as well. On 31 August 2023, the first time the holiday was celebrated in Moldova under the name of "Romanian Language Day", there were a multitude of events in the country. Notably, the Romanian Academy and the Academy of Sciences of Moldova held a meeting and jointly organized a simultaneous event at the headquarters of both organizations in Bucharest and Chișinău respectively. The Romanian Language Day is a non-working day in Moldova.

The Romanian Language Day is also an official holiday in Ukraine, taking place every 31 August as well. It was established on 12 March 2026, with the signing of a decree by Volodymyr Zelenskyy, the President of Ukraine, on the occasion of an official visit to Bucharest in Romania. The decree aimed at the "development of reciprocal understanding and reciprocal respect, as well as cooperation in Ukrainian–Romanian relations". Romania then already celebrated the Ukrainian Language Day in its country every 9 November. At the time, Ukraine's ethnic Romanian community numbered over 400,000 people, with the Ukrainian minority in Romania amounting to around 45,000 people. During its first official observance in Ukraine, the Romanian Language Day was commemorated in Chernivtsi (Cernăuți) and Odesa (Odesa).

Extraofficially, the Romanian Language Day is also celebrated and recognized internationally. For example, the Romanian embassy in Madrid, Spain, congratulated on this day all Romanian-speaking persons for "preserving their national identity through their language" and announced that it supported the initiative of the Romanian Cultural Institute's (ICR) branch in Madrid to start an online campaign to pay homage to the work of Romanian literature translators to Spanish. Cultural organizations also ensure that indigenous Romanian diaspora communities can also celebrate the holiday. This has been the case in Vidin (Vidin; Bulgaria), Chernivtsi and Zakarpattia Oblast (Ukraine, before the 2026 officialization of the holiday), the Timok Valley and Vojvodina (Serbia) and Méhkerék (Micherechi; Hungary).

== See also ==
- Public holidays in Moldova
- Public holidays in Romania
- Public holidays in Ukraine
