= Adèle Hommaire de Hell =

19th-century French explorer and writer

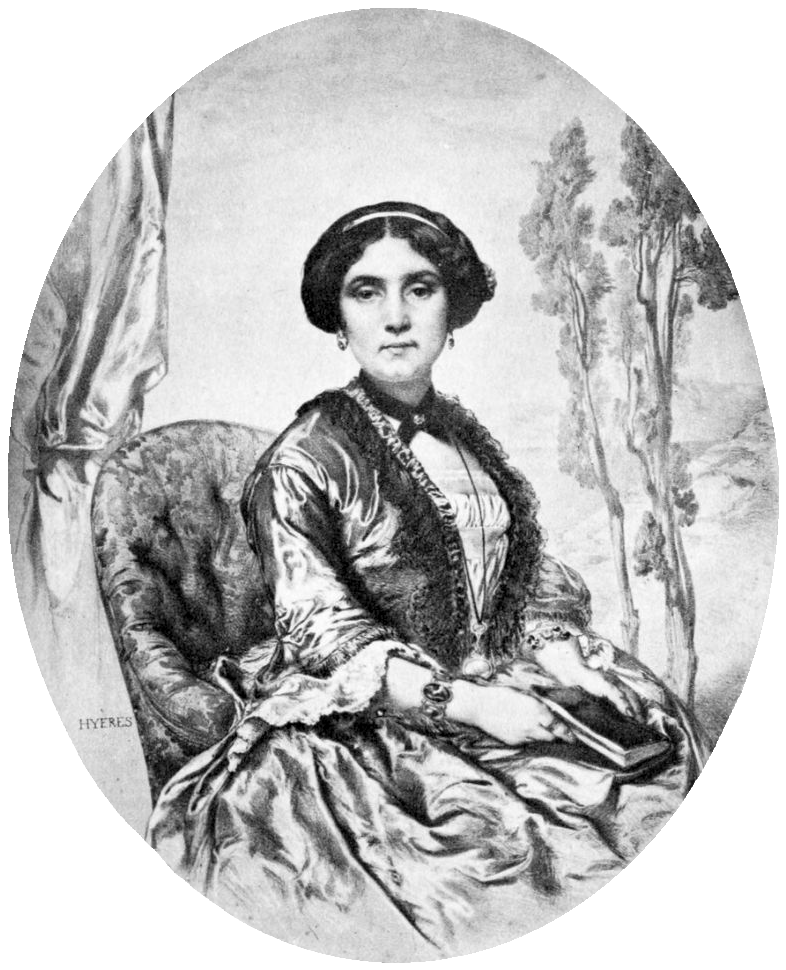
Adèle Hommaire de Hell

Jeanne Louise Adélaïde Hommaire de Hell née Hériot (1819–1883) was a French explorer and writer. From the mid-1830s, together with her husband, the geographer and engineer Xavier Hommaire de Hell, she undertook exploratory journeys to the Ottoman Empire, Moldavia, New Russia, the Caspian steppes, the Caucasus and Crimea. She is remembered above all for compiling detailed records of these journeys which were published from 1846 to 1868. She also documented her journey to Martinique where she visited her son in 1862.

== Biography ==
Born in 1819 in the Artois region of northern France, Jeanne Louise Adélaïde Hériot was brought up by her elder sister following her mother's early death. As her father was a schoolteacher, the family moved frequently as he took up posts in Franche-Comté, Bourbonnais and Auvergne. They later settled in Paris where she attended a school at Saint-Mandé.

Following the death of her father, she joined her sister in Saint-Étienne. In 1833 when just 15 she met and married Ignace Xavier Morand Hommaire de Hell, a student at the École de mines. In 1835, despite their recent marriage and the expected birth of their first child, her husband accepted a French-government assignment in Constantinople. After he had escaped a shipwreck, she joined him there with her baby son in May 1836.

Following her husband's discovery of iron mines near Kherson in 1838, he was commissioned to undertake an exploratory journey to New Russia. After extensive preparations, the couple set out in May 1840 on what was to be a four-year expedition from Ekaterinoslav on the River Dnieper to Yalta on the Crimean peninsula, travelling through Astrakhan along the coast of the Caspian Sea to the Manych River and then to the Caucasus and the Sea of Azov. From Adèle Hommaire's account of the expedition, Voyage dans les steppes de la Mer Caspienne et dans la Russie Méridionale (1860), she was enchanted by experiencing the primitive conditions of life in a tent or by staying with local inhabitants or government officials in the towns and villages they encountered. She also describes in detail the components which made up their expedition: camels, horses, armed escorts and attendants (Kalmyks and Cossacks), beds, cooking implements and supplies, as well as a carriage in which she and her husband made the journey.

Xavier Hommaire undertook a further journey to Persia but without Adèle. He died there of fever in August 1849. Thanks to his wife who completed the accounts of his travels and expanded his notes, Voyage en Turquie et en Perse was published in 1855.

In 1868, she travelled to Martinique where she visited her eldest son.

Adèle Hommaire de Hal died on 16 May 1883.

== Selected publications ==
- Adèle Hommaire de Hell (1846). Rêveries d'un voyageur. Amyot.
- Adèle Hommaire de Hell (1860). Voyage dans les steppes de la mer Caspienne et dans la Russie méridionale. L. Hachette.
- Adèle Hommaire de Hell (1868). Les Steppes de la mer Caspienne. Didier.
- Adèle Hommaire de Hell (1870). À travers le monde. Didier.
