= International Centre for Policy Studies =

Ukrainian think tank

The International Centre for Policy Studies (ICPS) is an independent NGO, founded in 1994 which aims to promote public policy concepts and practice and apply them to influential policy research that affects both the public and private sectors in Ukraine.

== Mission ==
Promotion of reforms, democratic principles of governance, and social transformations in Ukraine.

Main focus areas:

- Foreign Policy;
- Political Competition;
- Government Decisions;
- Reforms support;
- Conflict Settlement;
- Constitutional Process;
- Economic Forecast;
- Gender Equality;
- Fight against Corruption;

== Background ==
ICPS was founded in 1994 upon the initiative of the Prague-based Open Society Institute (OSI). At that moment, ICPS was the first independent think-tank in Ukraine. Its mission was to analyse economic policy and prepare long-term forecasts for the Government and President of Ukraine.

== Implemented projects ==
Over the past 24 years, ICPS has successfully completed a large number of projects in political and economic spheres aimed at increasing Ukraine's capacity in the world. During 2015-2018 the ICPS implemented 39 projects in the areas of reforms, reintegration and modernization of Ukraine. Several of those projects covered all the regions of the country.

List of implemented projects in 2015 – 2018:

Supporting reforms focus:

- Enhancing the Economic Capacity of Rural Areas in the Context of the Implementation of the EU-Ukraine AA;
- Hidden Triggers of Economic Growth in V4 Plus Ukraine;
- Analysis of the Quality of Reform Implementation and its Inter-Sectoral Influence;
- Transparent, Financially Sound and Competitive Municipalities in Ukraine;
- Impact Analysis of the EU-Ukraine DCFTA.

Conflict resolution focus:

- Initiating the Participatory National Dialogue in Ukraine
- Modelling of the Minsk agreements implementation and support of strategic advisors at the Ministry of Temporary Occupied Territories and IDPS
- Communication Campaign “Reinvent Respect” on Promotion of Tolerance and Mutual Understanding in the Society

Constitutional process focus:

- Participatory Dialogue for Constitutional Reform;
- Using World Expert Experience and Public Consultations in the Process of Amending the Constitution of Ukraine.

Gender equality focus:

- Empowering Women;
- Equal Opportunities for Men and Women in Politics, Business and Civil Society;
- Beyond the Protocol – Women and International Politics in Germany and Ukraine;
- Women’s Participation in Ukrainian Politics;
- Modernising Ukraine via Gender Equality Implementation.

Fight against corruption focus:

- Local Watchdogs to Ensure Control over Public Finances (for Rivne, Kherson, Sumy, Chernivtsi and Zhytomyr regions);
- Local Watchdogs in Ensuring Control over Public Finances (for Khmelnytskyi, Rivne, Chernivtsi, Chernihiv and Kherson regions);
- Coalition of regional CSOs for public finance control.

Leaders of Change focus:

- Ukraine Information Initiative training in Berlin;
- Visegrad Academy for Political Leadership;
- Mapping of the Needs of Political Education in Ukraine

== Regular Publications ==
- Inside Ukraine, regular analytical reports on the internal developments in Ukraine;
- Economic Insights and Forecasts, monthly analysis of Ukraine’s economic situation.

== Regular activities ==
- Diplomatic briefings, regular meetings with foreign diplomats based in Ukraine to discuss state decisions, political competition and economic forecast under the Chatham House rules;

== Membership/affiliations in professional associations/organizations ==
- PASOS, a network of policy centres in Central and Eastern Europe and Central Asia;
- Ukrainian Think Tanks Liaison Office in Brussels, an association of Ukrainian think tanks with a unique focus on joint action at the EU level to advance reforms within Ukraine and the European integration of Ukraine;
- EU-Ukraine Civil Society Platform, an instrument of bilateral cooperation between the EU and civil society in Ukraine envisaged by the country’s Association Agreement with the EU;
- Ukrainian National Platform of the Eastern Partnership Civil Society Forum, an open site for NGOs for the discussions, consultations, information activities in the implementation framework of the Eastern Partnership policy;
- Public Council at the Parliamentary Committee on Foreign Policy of Ukraine, a platform of public experts, aimed at providing public expertise of the foreign policy of Ukraine;
- Public Council at the inter-fractional union “Equal Opportunities” at the Parliament of Ukraine, a platform of non-governmental organisations and experts, aimed at promotion of gender equality in politics, public administration and society in Ukraine;

== Major donors (2015 – 2018) ==
- International Renaissance Foundation, Ukraine's one of the largest organization providing financial and operational assistance to the development of an open and democratic society in Ukraine by supporting key civic initiatives.
- Matra, social transformation programme of the Government of the Netherlands;
- German Marshall Fund of the United States, a programme aimed to contribute research and analysis and convenes leaders on transatlantic issues relevant to policymakers.
- UK-UA Reform Assistance Programme of the UK Department for International Development;
- Finnish Local Cooperation Fund, a fund administered by the Embassy of Finland in Kyiv and aimed at supporting local NGOs;
- Canada Fund for Local Initiatives, a program that supports small projects proposed and implemented by local NGOs and other grassroots organizations such as village councils, cooperatives and women’s groups;
- International Visegrad Fund, which aims to facilitate and promote the development of closer cooperation between the V4 region and other countries, especially in the Western Balkan and Eastern Partnership regions
- Interpeace, independent, international peacebuilding organization, initially established by the UN to develop innovative solutions to build peace.

== International recognition ==
2017: ICPS was ranked by 2017 Global Go To Think Tank Index Report prepared at the University of Pennsylvania (USA):

- 34th position in the Top Think Tanks in Central and Eastern Europe Category,
- 52nd position in the Top Education Policy Think Tanks Category;
- 112th position in the Top Foreign Policy and International Affairs Think Tanks Category.

2016: ICPS was ranked by 2016 Global Go To Think Tank Index Report prepared at the University of Pennsylvania (USA):

- 33nd position in the Top Think Tanks in Central and Eastern Europe Category,
- 54th position in the Top Education Policy Think Tanks Category;
- 113th position in the Top Foreign Policy and International Affairs Think Tanks Category.

2015: ICPS was ranked by 2015 Global Go To Think Tank Index Report prepared at the University of Pennsylvania (USA):

- 32nd position in the Top Think Tanks in Central and Eastern Europe Category,
- 55th position in the Top Education Policy Think Tanks Category;
- 112th position in the Top Foreign Policy and International Affairs Think Tanks Category.

2014: ICPS was ranked by 2014 Global Go To Think Tank Index Report prepared at the University of Pennsylvania (USA):

- 40nd position in the Top Think Tanks in Central and Eastern Europe Category,
- 54th position in the Top Education Policy Think Tanks Category.
- 2013: ICPS was ranked by 2013 Global Go To Think Tank Index Report prepared at the University of Pennsylvania (USA):
- 43rd position in the Top Think Tanks in Central and Eastern Europe Category,
- 45th position in the Top Education Policy Think Tanks Category.

2012: ICPS was ranked by 2012 Global Go To Think Tank Index Report prepared at the University of Pennsylvania (USA):

- 43rd position in the Top 60 Think Tanks in Central and Eastern Europe Category,
- Rated as one of the Top Education Policy Think Tanks in the Top Education Policy Think Tanks Category.

2010: ICPS won a PASOS competition for policy studies among PASOS members on the topic “Civil Society and the European Neighborhood and Partnership Instrument (ENPI)”;

2010: ICPS was ranked by 2010 Global Go To Think Tank Index Report prepared at the University of Pennsylvania (USA):

- 18th position in the Central and Eastern European Think Tanks Category.

2009: ICPS was ranked by 2009 Global Go To Think Tank Index Report prepared at the University of Pennsylvania (USA):

- 14th position in the Top 30 Central and Eastern European Think Tanks Category;
- Ranked among 392 Think Tanks Nominated As One Of The Leading Think Tanks In The World.

2009: ICPS was ranked the best predictor of the dollar exchange rate among companies by the Credit Rating Agency.

2008: ICPS was ranked among the top 228 think-tanks in the world, out of 5080, by the Foreign Policy Research Institute (FPRI).

2005: ICPS was recognized as the most successful think-tank in Ukraine by the Global Development Network.

== Major international partners ==
- United Nations Development Programme in Ukraine (Kyiv);
- European Policy Centre (EPC), an independent, not-for-profit think tank dedicated to fostering European integration through analysis and debate (Brussels);
- Centre for European Policy Studies (CEPS), a leading think tank and forum for debate on EU affairs (Brussels);
- International Centre for Democratic Transition (ICDT), non-profit organisation, which collects the experiences of recent democratic transitions and shares them with those who are determined to follow that same path (Budapest);
- Robert Schuman Foundation, a reference research centre, developing studies on the European Union and its policies promoting the content of these in France, Europe and elsewhere in the world (Paris);
- Institute for Economic and Social Reforms (INEKO), non-governmental non-profit organization established in support of economic and social reforms which aim to remove barriers to the long-term positive development of the Slovak economy and society (Bratislava);
- Cultural Vistas GmbH, a non-profit exchange organization promoting global understanding and collaboration among individuals and institutions (Berlin - New York);
- mediatEur, non-profit organisation, supporting the peaceful transformation of armed conflicts within and between states, by promoting the use of innovative and effective methods of conflict resolution, dialogue and mediation (Brussels);
- swisspeace, a practice-oriented peace research institute analysing violent conflicts and develops strategies for their peaceful transformation (Bern);
- Polis 180, German grassroots think tank created by young policy enthusiasts, dealing with European and foreign affairs. It aims to overcome party divides and instead focuses on the substance of the questions that bother young generation most;
- Netherlands Institute for Multiparty Democracy (NIMD), a democracy assistance organisation of political parties in the Netherlands and for political parties in young democracies.
