= Xavier Hommaire de Hell =

French geographer, engineer and traveller

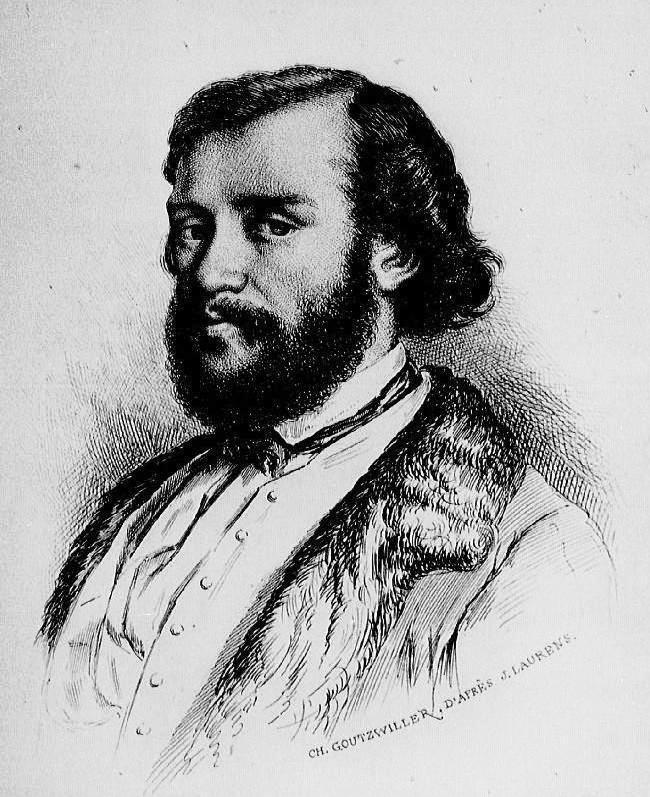
Xavier Hommaire de Hell, drawing by Jules Laurens

Ignace Xavier Morand Hommaire de Hell, often known as Xavier Hommaire de Hell, (24 November 1812 in Altkirch – 29 August 1848 in Isfahan) was a French geographer, engineer and traveller who carried out research in Turkey, southern Russia and Iran.

== Biography ==
After attending school in Altkirch and Dijon, Hommaire graduated as an engineer at the École des Mines in Saint-Étienne in 1833. There he met Adèle Hériot whom he married in 1834. In October 1835, he went to Turkey where he coordinated the construction of a suspension bridge in Constantinople and a lighthouse on the Black Sea coast. In 1838, he arrived in southern Russia where he performed ethnographical research and geographical surveys. After he discovered coal resources along the Dnieper River, Czar Nicholas I awarded him the St Vladimir Cross. In 1842, while working on mining and road-building projects in Moldavia, he fell ill and returned to France. The following year he became a member of the Société de Géographie and the Société géologique and published a number of scientific papers. In 1844 the Société de Géographie awarded him their Gold Medal .

With the help of his wife, he embarked on Les steppes de la mer Caspienne (1844–1847) and in 1845 was awarded the Legion of Honour.

After receiving a grant of 3,000 francs per year from the Ministry of Commerce and Agriculture, he left with his wife and the painter Jules Laurens on an extended journey to the Orient. In Turkey, he wrote reports on trade in the Bosporus and the Black Sea before proceeding to Iran. As he expected the journey to be difficult, he sent his wife back to France, travelling only with Laurens. In June 1847, they sailed to Trabzon, entering Iran through Diyarbakir and Lake Van that November. In February 1848, he finally arrived in Tehran after suffering from cholera and ophthalmia on the way. With the help of the French ambassador, he met Mohammad Shah Qajar who entrusted him with studying the feasibility of a canal bringing water from Shahrud river to the Savojbolagh plain. Hommaire left for Mazandaran in May 1848 where he carried out surveys including a study of the Mosque of Varamin. He returned to Tehran to complete his research notes and then travelled to Isfahan. He arrived there seriously ill and died two weeks later on 29 August 1848. Laurens sent his notes back to his wife in Paris who completed a full account of his travels (1856–1860) subsidized by the French authorities.
