= Odesa Border Detachment =

26th Odesa Border Detachment
- 26 прикордонний загін (Ukrainian)
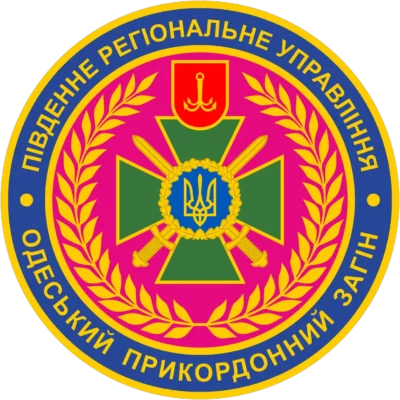
- Detachment Insignia
- Founded: 1992
- Country: Ukraine
- Allegiance: Ministry of Internal Affairs
- Branch: State Border Guard Service of Ukraine
- Type: Brigade
- Role: Border Guard
- Part of: State Border Guard Service of Ukraine
- Garrison/HQ: Odesa
- Engagements: Russo-Ukrainian war: War in Donbass; Russian invasion of Ukraine; Southern Ukraine campaign; Odesa strikes (2022-present)

Commanders
- Current commander: Colonel Bohdan Ignatyuk

The Odesa Border Detachment (MUN 2138) is a brigade level detachment of the Southern Department of the State Border Service of Ukraine. The detachment guards the Ukrainian coast along the Odesa Oblast and Mykolaiv Oblast, a total length of 480 km as well as several seaports, airports, riverine ports, ferry stations and railway stations.

== History ==
On 1 July 1921, the 5th Border Battalion was expanded and became the 26th Ochakiv Border Detachment in Ochakiv and transferred to Odesa in 1925. On 25 July 1941, it became the 26th Combined Border Regiment of the NKVD as the 1st and 2nd Commandants of the Black Sea Border District were merged into.it and 211 command and political, non-commissioned officers and privates were called up from the reserve. On 7 August 1941, 24 lieutenants and 4 junior lieutenants graduates of the Odesa Infantry School and several junior officers from the 249th convoy regiment of the NKVD, were transferred to the 26th border detachment which now numbered more than 4,000 people. The regiment was personnel under the command of Separate Coastal Army. Then the detachment took part in the Siege of Odessa but was forced to capitulate following 73 days of defense. On 10 April 1944, the detachment received the Order of the Red Banner for the defense of Odesa.

In 1992, the detachment came under the jurisdiction of Ukraine. In 2002, the border control unit "Black Sea" was merged with the 26th border detachment. In 2003 the 24th separate aviation squadron was split from the detachment. In 2011, the detachment celebrated its 90th anniversary.

The detachment saw combat during the War in Donbass. On 1 September 2014, at around 9 p.m., a squad of the detachment was traveling in a UAZ vehicle when it engaged in a clash near Sakhanka during the Battle of Mariupol, a guardsman of the detachment (Andriets Oleg Anatoliyovych) was killed and three more were wounded. On 26 March 2015, a guardsman of the detachment (Barolis Yan Volodymyrovych) was seriously wounded during the defense of a checkpoint in Sukha Balka, Donetsk Oblast and died on 26 April 2015. he In 2016, the detachment undertook Decommunisation measures.

On 31 May 2022, the detachment detained a human smuggling organizer. On 1 January 2024, the detachment destroyed four Shahed-136/131 UAVs. On 9 May 2024, the detachment destroyed three Shahed drones. On 7 October 2024, the detachment destroyed an Iranian Shahed drone.

== Structure ==
The structure of the detachment is as follows:

- Management and Headquarters
- Border Service Department
- Border Service Department "Kurortne"
- Border Service Department "Karolino-Bugaz"
- Border Service Department "Chornomorsk"
- Border Service Department "Odesa"
- Border Service Department "Pivdenny"
- Border Service Department "Ochakiv"
- Border Service Department "Mykolaiv"
- Type C Border Service Department
- Guardian units

Following checkpoints are under the detachment's operation:

- Aerial Transport checkpoints:
  - "Odesa International Airport"
  - "Mykolaiv International Airport"
  - "Kulbakino Air Base"
- Sea and Ferry checkpoints:
  - "Black Sea Sea Port"
- Marine Cargo and Cruiser Checkpoints:
  - "Port of Odesa"
  - "Black Sea Fishing Port"
  - "Black Sea Shipyard"
  - "Pivdennyi Port"
  - "Port Ochakiv"
  - "Port of Mykolaiv"
  - "Dnieper-Bug Sea Commercial Port"
  - "Specialized Seaport Olvia"
  - CJSC "Mykolaiv Potash Terminal"
  - LLC "Agricultural enterprise "Nibulon""
- Riverine port checkpoints:
  - Mykolaiv River Port
- Railway checkpoints:
  - International Railway post "Lisky"
- Other checkpoints:
  - International Marine "Vizyrka"
  - OJSC "Ocean Shipbuilding Plant"
  - PJSC "Black Sea Shipbuilding Plant"
  - International Sea Port point "Mykolaiv Maritime Agency"

== Commanders ==
- Colonel Selieverstov V. I. (1985–1992)
- Colonel Horyntsev O. N. (1992–1995)
- Captain Zhuravkov G. N. (1995–2000)
- Colonel V. K. Pleshko (2000–2002)
- Colonel Tokovy I. B. (2002–2004)
- Colonel Kalashnikov O. T. (2004–2006)
- Colonel Kukhtei O. R. (2006–2007)
- Lieutenant Colonel Vasylkivskyi V. I. (2007–2009)
- Colonel Pochtovy O. G. (2009–2011)
- Colonel Vasylkivskyi V. I. (2011–2013)
- Colonel Ignatiev A. M. (September 2013-August 2015)
- Colonel Lavrentiev S. D. (08.2015—01.2020)
- Colonel Rybachenko S. P. (January 2020-December 2021)
- Colonel Vitrovchak V. G. (December 2021-November 2023)
- Lieutenant Colonel Rynkov K.I. (November 2023-)
