= Dnieper-Bug Sea Commercial Port =

Coordinates: 46°46′08″N 31°56′17″E

- Native name: Дніпро-Бузький морський торговельний порт

Location
- Country: Ukraine
- Location: Bohoyavlensʹkyy prospekt, 471, Mykolaiv, 54051

Details
- Opened: 1978
- Operated by: Port of Mykolaiv
- Type of harbour: natural
- Size: 135 hectares
- No. of berths: 10
- Employees: 400
- Head of Port: Fedor Pavlovich Bedin

Statistics
- Annual cargo tonnage: 5.5 million tons

The Dnieper-Bug Sea Commercial Port is a seaport located in Ukraine on the left bank of the Bug estuary near the Rus' Spit, 10 miles south of the Mykolaiv Sea Commercial Port and 32 miles from the Black Sea.

== See also ==
- List of ports in Ukraine
- Transport in Ukraine
