= Kerch Seaport Komysh-Burun =

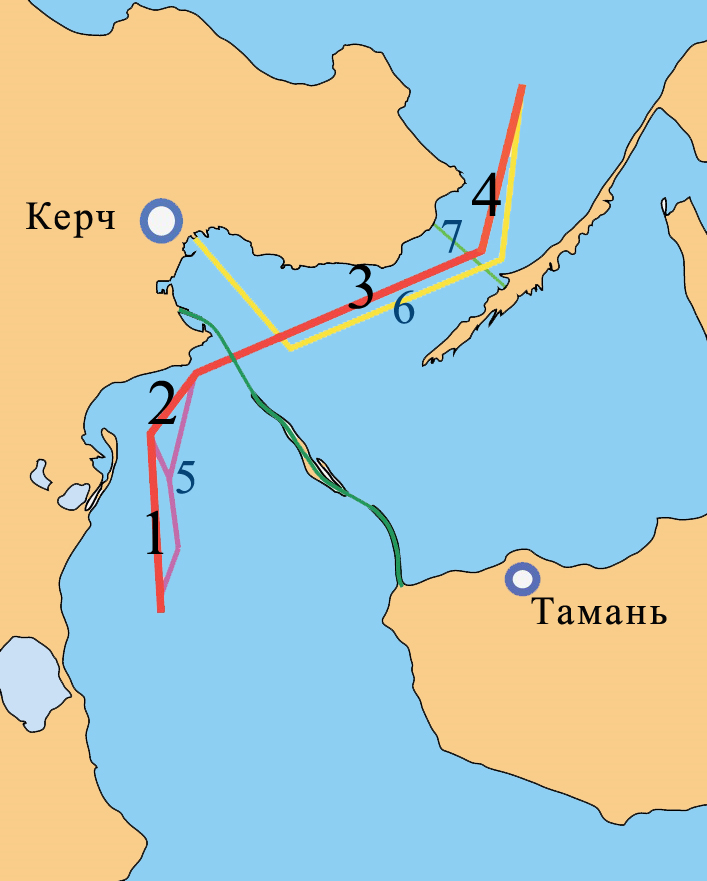
- Interactive map of Kerch Seaport Komysh-Burun
- Native name: Комиш-Бурун (порт)

Location
- Country: Ukraine
- Location: Kerch; Autonomous Republic of Crimea
- Coordinates: 45°16′24″N 36°24′58″E

Details
- Opened: 1951
- Operated by: GUP RK "Komysh-Burunska Production Company"
- Type of harbour: natural / artificial
- No. of berths: 4
- Depth: 8.2 м

Kerch Seaport Komysh-Burun is a seaport in the Arshyntseve district, in the industrial zone of Kerch, which specializes in transshipment of ferroalloys, coal, ilmenite, manganese ores, coke, and general cargo.

== See also ==
- List of ports in Ukraine
- Transport in Ukraine
- Cargo turnover of Ukrainian ports
- Komysh-Burunsky iron ore plant
