= Sevastopol Sea Fishing Port =

- Click on the map for a fullscreen view
- Native name: Севастопольський морський рибний порт

Location
- Country: Ukraine
- Location: Rybakov Street, 5, Sevastopol, 99014, Ukraine
- Coordinates: 45°25′N 33°26′E

Details
- Opened: 1964
- Operated by: State Committee for Fisheries of Ukraine
- Type of harbour: natural
- Director: Ruslan Oleksandrovych Ryhovanov

Sevastopol Sea Fishing Port is a warm-water seaport of Sevastopol, located on the Black Sea coast in Kamiesch.

The Sevastopol Sea Fishing Port was organized by the order of the Council of Ministers of the Ukrainian SSR No. 108-r of January 29, 1964. Since October 1992, the port has been open for international freight traffic. On December 1, 1993, the port was reorganized into the state enterprise "Sevastopol Sea Fishing Port." Currently, the company is under the management of the State Committee for Fisheries of Ukraine.

The company carries out a range of works related to maritime transportation and storage of fish products, petroleum products, general cargo, metal, etc., as well as provides ship reception services. The port has 9 cargo berths with a total length of 1277 m. In 11 months of 2010, the port handled 2,446,000 tons of cargo.

== See also ==
- List of ports in Ukraine
- Transport in Ukraine
- Water transport of Ukraine
- Cargo turnover of Ukrainian ports
