= List of ports in Ukraine =

Seaports and riverports

Ukraine

Ukraine possesses the greatest sea port potential among all the countries of the Black Sea and the Sea of Azov. There are 18 seaports located along the Ukrainian coast.

== Sea ports ==
All the ports of Ukraine are managed by the Ukrainian Sea Ports Authority. In 2022, the majority of these ports were effectively closed to international ship traffic due to the ongoing Russian invasion of Ukraine and Russian naval blockade of the Black Sea. Port of Odesa, along with to a lesser degree Chornomorsk and Pivdennyi, have been partially open to limited convoy-based grain and ammonia (for fertilizer) exports under the UN-brokered Black Sea Grain Initiative.

=== Danube ===
- Port of Izmail
- Reni Commercial Seaport
- Port of Ust-Danube

=== Black Sea ===
- Port of Kherson
- Port of Sevastopol (Russia)
- Port of Skadovsk

Crimea

- Port of Alushta (Russia)
- Port of Feodosiya (Russia)
- Port of Yalta (Russia)
- Port of Yevpatoriya (Russia)

Mykolaiv Oblast

- Dnieper-Bug Sea Commercial Port
- Port of Mykolaiv
- Sea Specialized Port Nika-Tera
- Specialized Seaport Olvia

Odesa Oblast

- Port of Bilhorod-Dnistrovskyi
- Port of Chornomorsk
- Port of Izmail
- Port of Odesa
- Pivdennyi Port
- Reni Commercial Seaport
- Ust-Danube Commercial Seaport

=== Sea of Azov ===
- Port of Berdiansk
- Port of Kerch (Russia) (Port Krym)
- Kerch Seaport Komysh-Burun(Russia)
- Port of Mariupol(Russia)

=== Fishing ports ===
- Kerch Fishing PortRussia)
- Sevastopol Sea Fishing Port(Russia)

== River ports ==
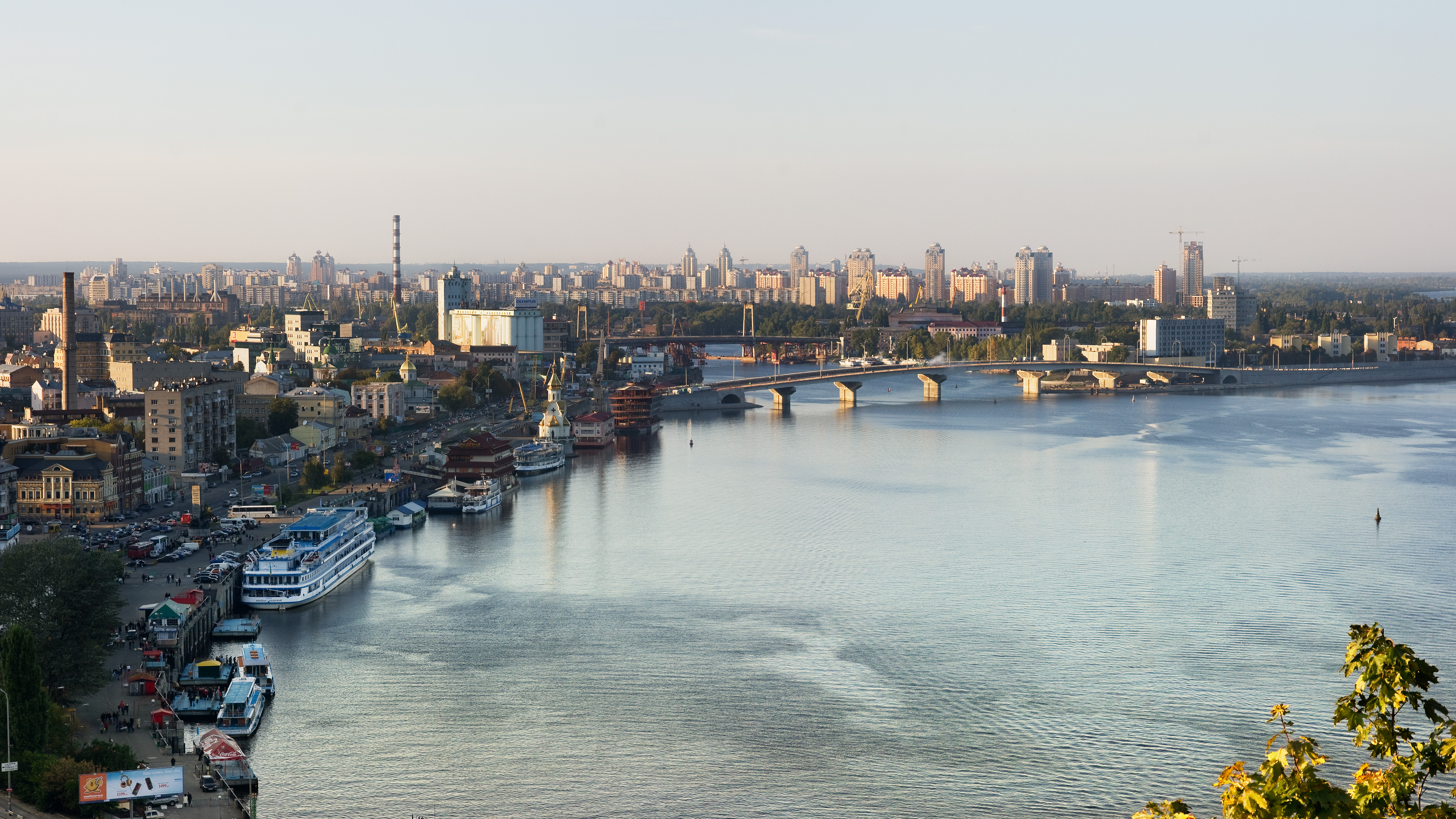
Kyiv River Port

- Cherkasy River Port
- Chernihiv River Port
- Dnipriany River Port
- Dnipropetrovsk River Port
- Kamianske River Port
- Kherson River Port
- Port of Kiliia
- Kremenchuk River Port
- Kyiv River Port
- Mykolaiv River Port
- Nikopol River Port
- Nova Kakhovka River Port
- Pereiaslav River Port
- Rzhyshchiv River Port
- Zaporizhzhia River Port

== See also ==
- Transport in Ukraine
