= Sea Specialized Port Nika-Tera =

Coordinates: 46°51′02″N 31°59′01″E

Specialized Seaport Nika-Tera
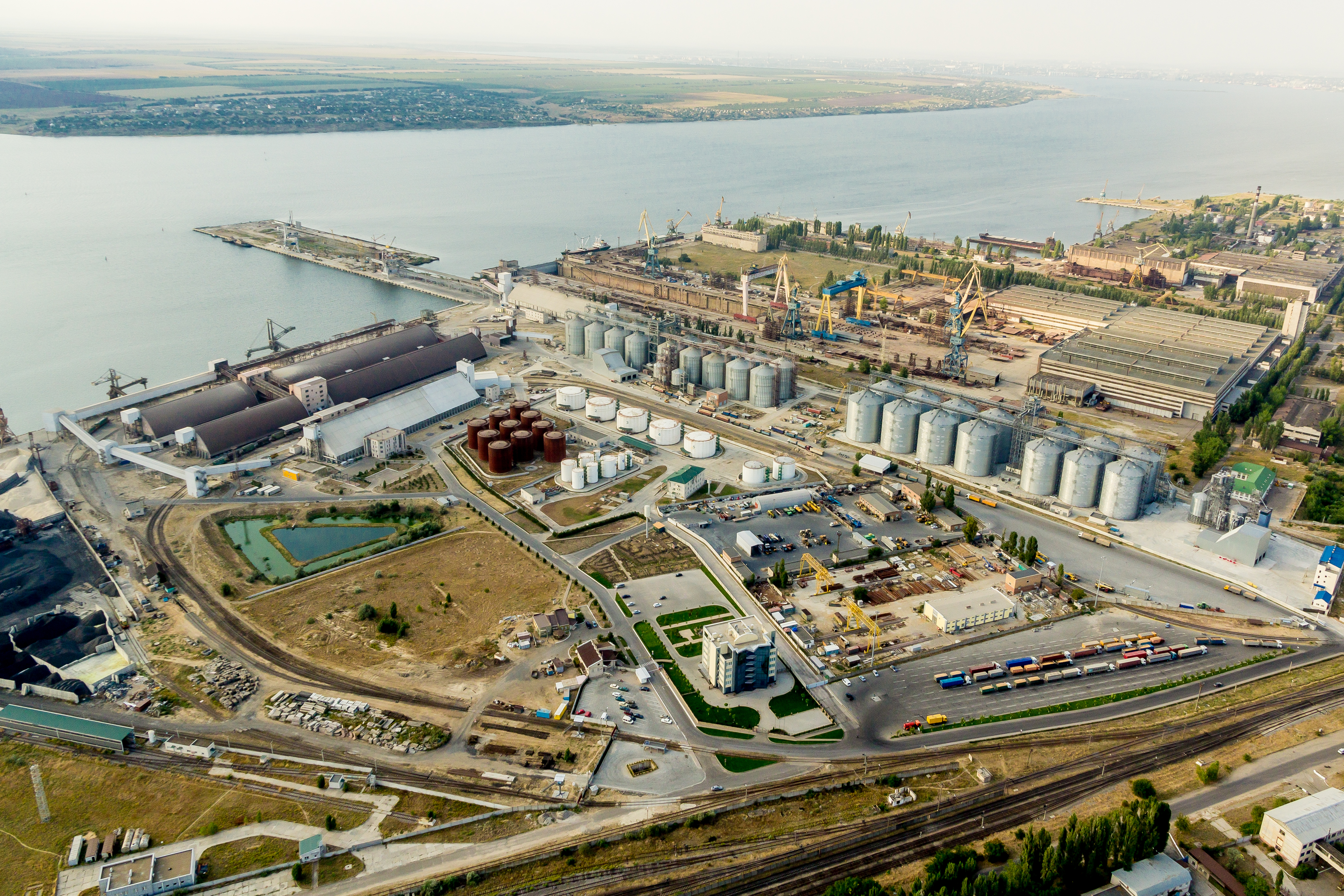
- Click on the map for a fullscreen view
- Native name: Морський спеціалізований порт "Ніка-Тера"

Location
- Country: Ukraine
- Location: 54052, Mykolaiv, Aivazovsky Street, 23

Details
- Opened: 1995
- Owned by: Dmytro Firtash
- Type of harbour: natural
- Size of harbour: 536,485 м²
- Land area: 422,718 м²
- No. of berths: 7
- Head of the Port: Alim Takhirovych Ahakishyyev

Statistics
- Annual cargo tonnage: 4.5 млн тонн
- Website www.nikatera.com

The Specialized Seaport Nika-Tera (Ukrainian: Морський спеціалізований порт "Ніка-Тера", romanized: Morskyi spetsializovanyi port 'Nika-Tera') is a diversified port that provides stevedoring services for transshipment, storage, preparation, and dispatch of various goods in the region. The area of the approach channel and operating water area of the port is 67.4 hectares.

== See also ==
- List of ports in Ukraine
- Transport in Ukraine
