= Specialized Seaport Olvia =

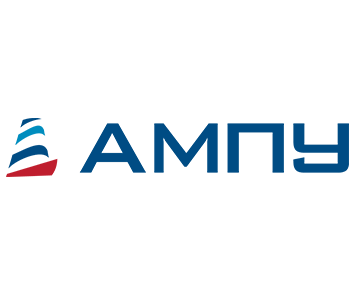
- Interactive map of Specialized Seaport Olvia
- Native name: Спеціалізований морський порт «Ольвія»

Location
- Country: Ukraine
- Location: м. Mykolaiv, а/c 170, 54052
- Coordinates: 46°49′59″N 31°57′22″E

Details
- Opened: 1965
- Operated by: Ukrainian Sea Ports Authority
- Owned by: Ministry of Infrastructure of Ukraine
- Type of harbour: natural
- No. of berths: 8
- Employees: 827
- Head of administration: Andriy Yuriyovych Yehorov

Statistics
- Annual cargo tonnage: 3 million tons
- Website; Site of the Stevedoring Company, Site of the Private Sea Terminal

The Specialized Seaport Olivia (Ukrainian: Спеціалізований морський порт "Ольвія", romanized: Spezializovanyi morskyi port 'Olviya', until 2017 known as "Specialized Seaport Oktyabrsk") is a seaport located on the left bank of the Bug Estuary 25 km from Mykolaiv. According to the Law of Ukraine "On Seaports of Ukraine," the functions of the seaport administration are performed by the Olvia branch of the state enterprise of the Ukrainian Sea Ports Authority. Its name derives from the nearby ancient Greek city of Olbia.

== See also ==
- List of ports in Ukraine
- Transport in Ukraine
