= Port Ochakiv =

- Interactive map of Port Ochakiv
- Location in Ukraine
- Native name: порт «Очаків» (in Ukrainian)

Location
- Country: Ukraine
- Location: Olvia Street, 1 Kutsurub Village 57550, Ochakiv Raion, Mykolaiv Oblast
- Coordinates: 46°37′54″N 31°34′58″E

Port Ochakiv (Ukrainian: порт «Очаків») is a seaport that is located in the Ochakiv Raion, Mykolaiv Oblast, Ukraine. In 2008-2011, the port built a berth wall 140 meters long, as well as a grain processing complex and warehouse, which allows for the accumulation of shipments of grain cargo.

== See also ==
- List of ports in Ukraine
- Transport in Ukraine
- Water transport of Ukraine
- Cargo turnover of Ukrainian ports
