= Port of Alushta =

Alushta Sea Commercial Port is an unrealized project, a commercial sea port in the city of Alushta, on the Black Sea coast of Crimea. The port of Alushta is actually a very small port in Ukraine. Plans for its expansion existed in the USSR.

== See also ==
- List of ports in Ukraine
- Transport in Ukraine
- Cargo turnover of Ukrainian ports
