= Mykolaiv River Port =

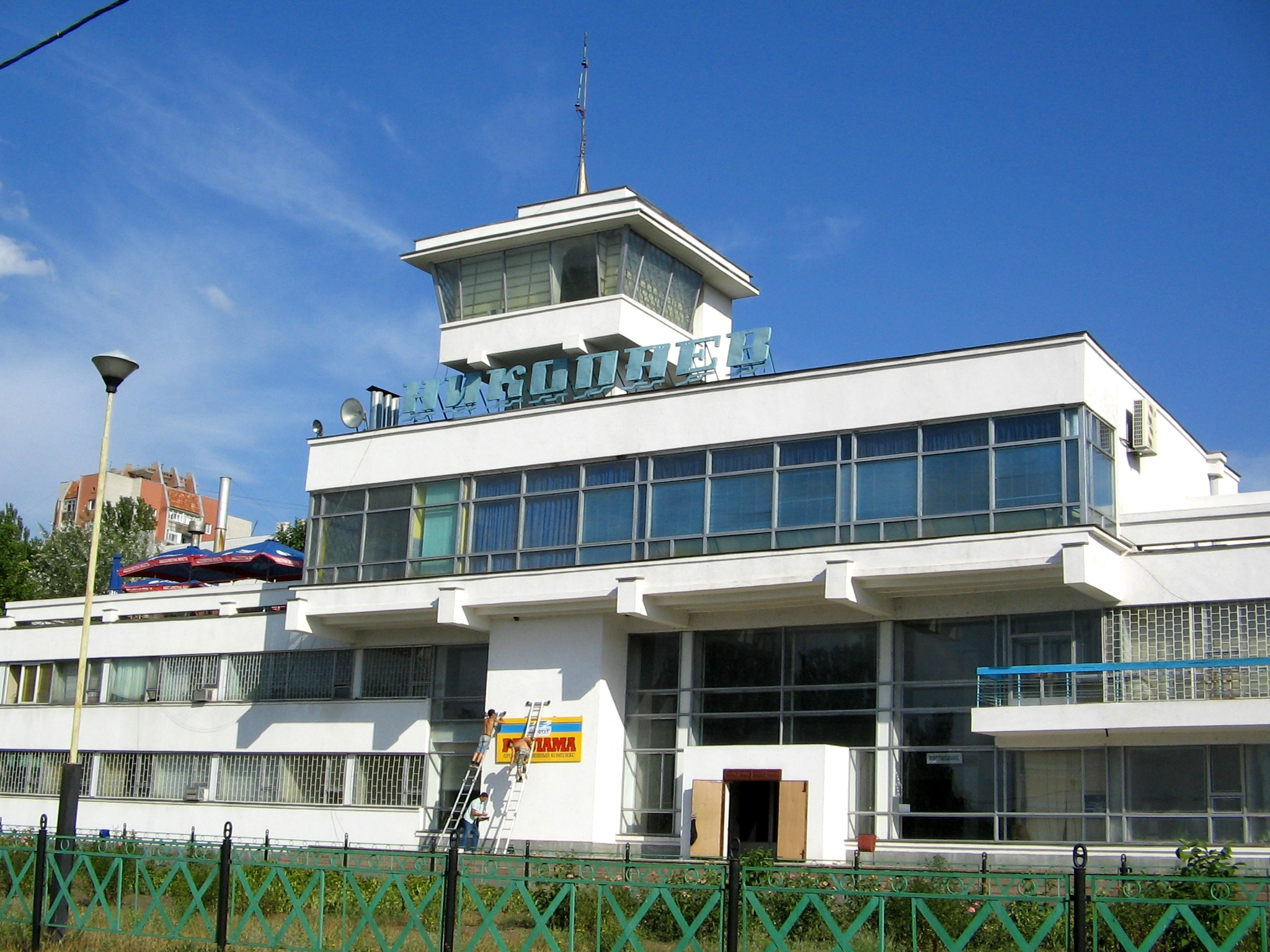
- Interactive map of Mykolaiv River Port
- Native name: Миколаївський річковий порт

Location
- Country: Ukraine
- Location: Vulytsya Proektna, 1, м. Mikolaiv, 54052
- Coordinates: 46°56′25″N 31°57′14″E

Details
- Opened: 1882
- Operated by: АSК «Ukrrichflot»
- Type of harbour: natural
- No. of berths: 7
- Employees: 827
- Head of Port: Volodymyr Petrovych Serbinov

Statistics
- Annual cargo tonnage: 5 million tons
- Website www.riverport.mykolayiv.com

Mykolaiv River Port is an inland port of Mykolaiv located on the left bank of the Southern Bug River, 40 km upstream from the confluence of the river with the Dnieper estuary.

== See also ==
- List of ports in Ukraine
- Transport in Ukraine
