= Port of Kiliia =

Riverport in Odesa region, Ukraine

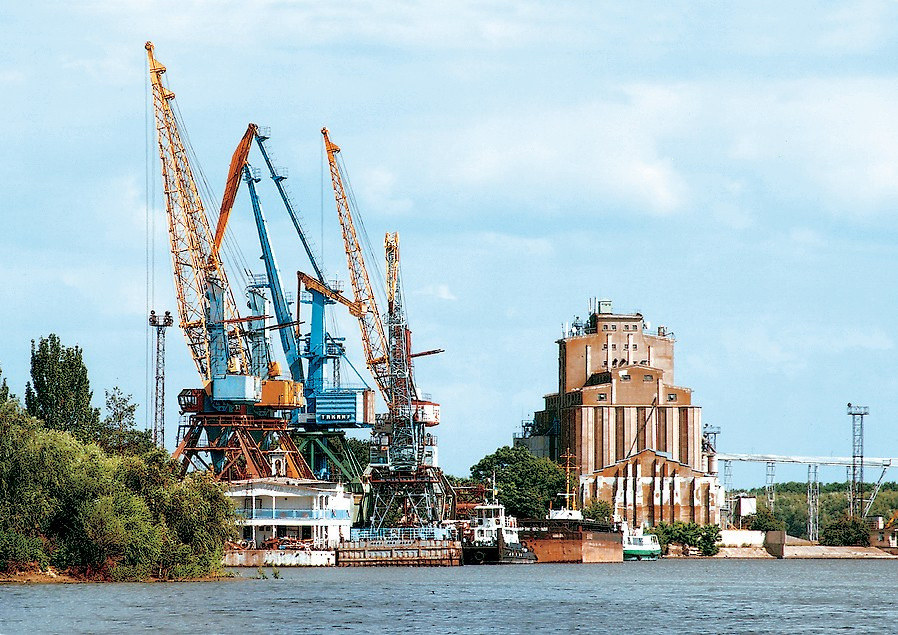
- Port point in Kiliia
- Interactive map of Port of Kiliia
- Native name: Кілійський порт

Location
- Country: Ukraine
- Location: Kiliia, Odesa Oblast
- Coordinates: 45°26′31.4″N 29°15′24.9″E

Details
- Land area: 47 км
- No. of wharfs: Kiliia Shipbuilding and Ship Repair Plant
- No. of piers: 150 м

Statistics
- Website www.danube-river.info

The Port of Kiliia (Ukrainian: Кілійський порт, romanized: Kiliyskyi port) is a river port of the Ust-Danube Commercial Seaport. It is located on the 47-km section of the Chilia branch of the Danube River, in the city of Kiliia. The length of the berth front is 150 m, the depth of the berths is 4 m.

== History ==
The port was founded in the late 19th century, during the active development of the Port of Odesa. Currently, the port specializes in handling bulk cargo, including grain, which is exported to the Middle East and the Mediterranean. The port has a grain processing complex, equipped warehouses, both indoor (960 m2) and open (17.6 thousand m2). The port has a shipyard with 50 years of experience in the field of shipbuilding, which produces all types of supplies and services for ships of both sea and river fleets.

== See also ==
- List of ports in Ukraine
- Transport in Ukraine
- Cargo Turnover of Ukrainian Ports
