= Reni Commercial Seaport =

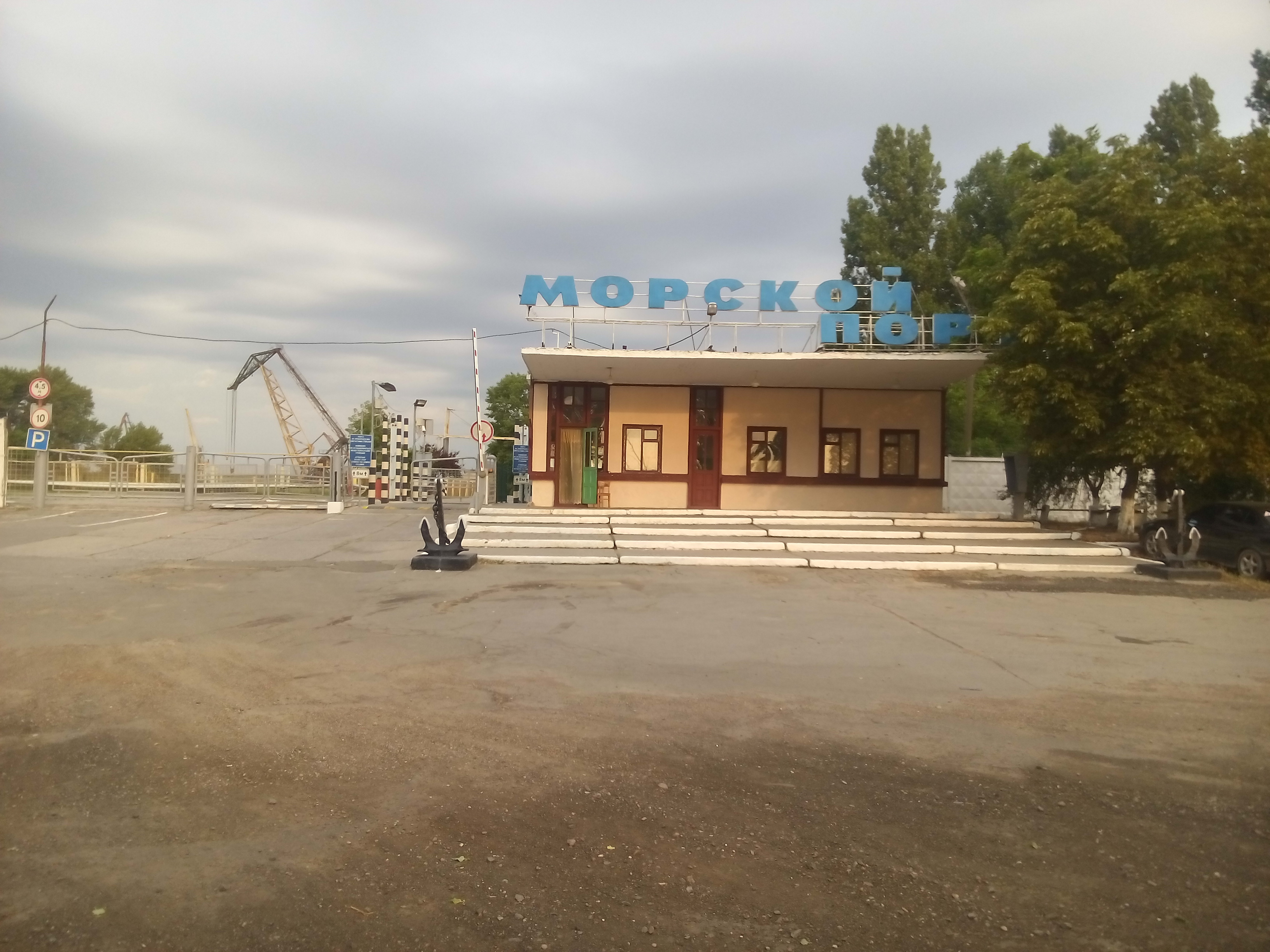
- Interactive map of Reni Commercial Seaport
- Native name: Морський порт Рені

Location
- Country: Ukraine
- Location: Reni, Izmail Raion, Odesa Oblast
- Coordinates: 45°25′15″N 28°17′25″E

Details
- Opened: December, 1816
- Head of the Port: Yuriy Kononenko

Statistics
- Annual cargo tonnage: 1.3 million tons (December 20, 2021)
- Website www.portreni.com.ua

The Reni Seaport (Ukrainian: Морський порт Рені, romanized: Morskyi port Reni) is a port located on the left bank of the Danube. It is an important transport hub of Ukraine, where the work of river, sea, road, and rail transport is closely intertwined. Navigation takes place throughout the year. The maximum depth near the berths is 3.5–12 m (average 7.5 m), which allows you to handle any type of cargo. According to the Law of Ukraine "On Seaports of Ukraine," the functions of the seaport administration are performed by the Rhine branch of the state enterprise of the Ukrainian Sea Ports Authority. The Reni port has been damaged as a result of the 2022 Russian invasion of Ukraine.

== Gallery ==
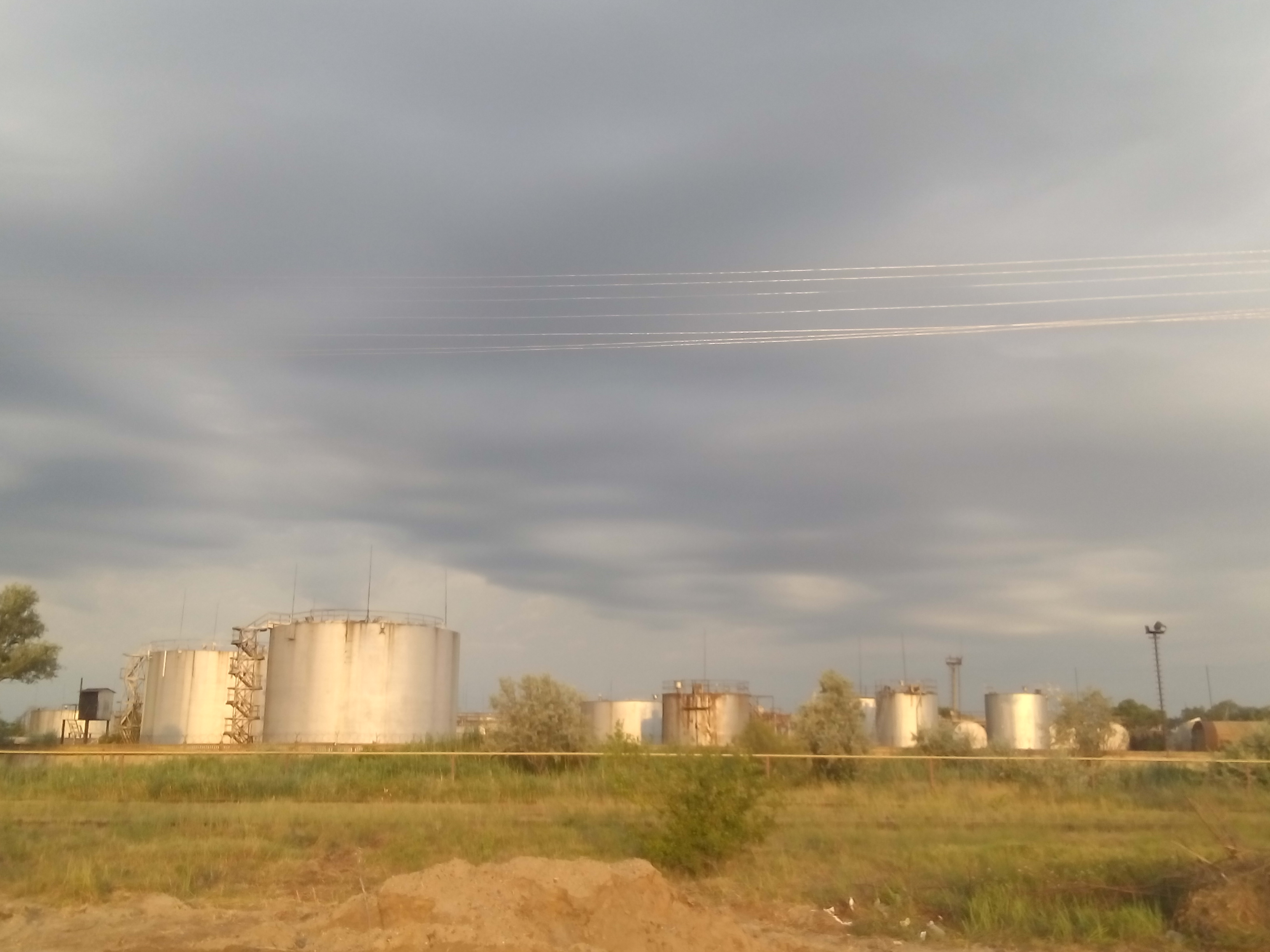
Port facilities

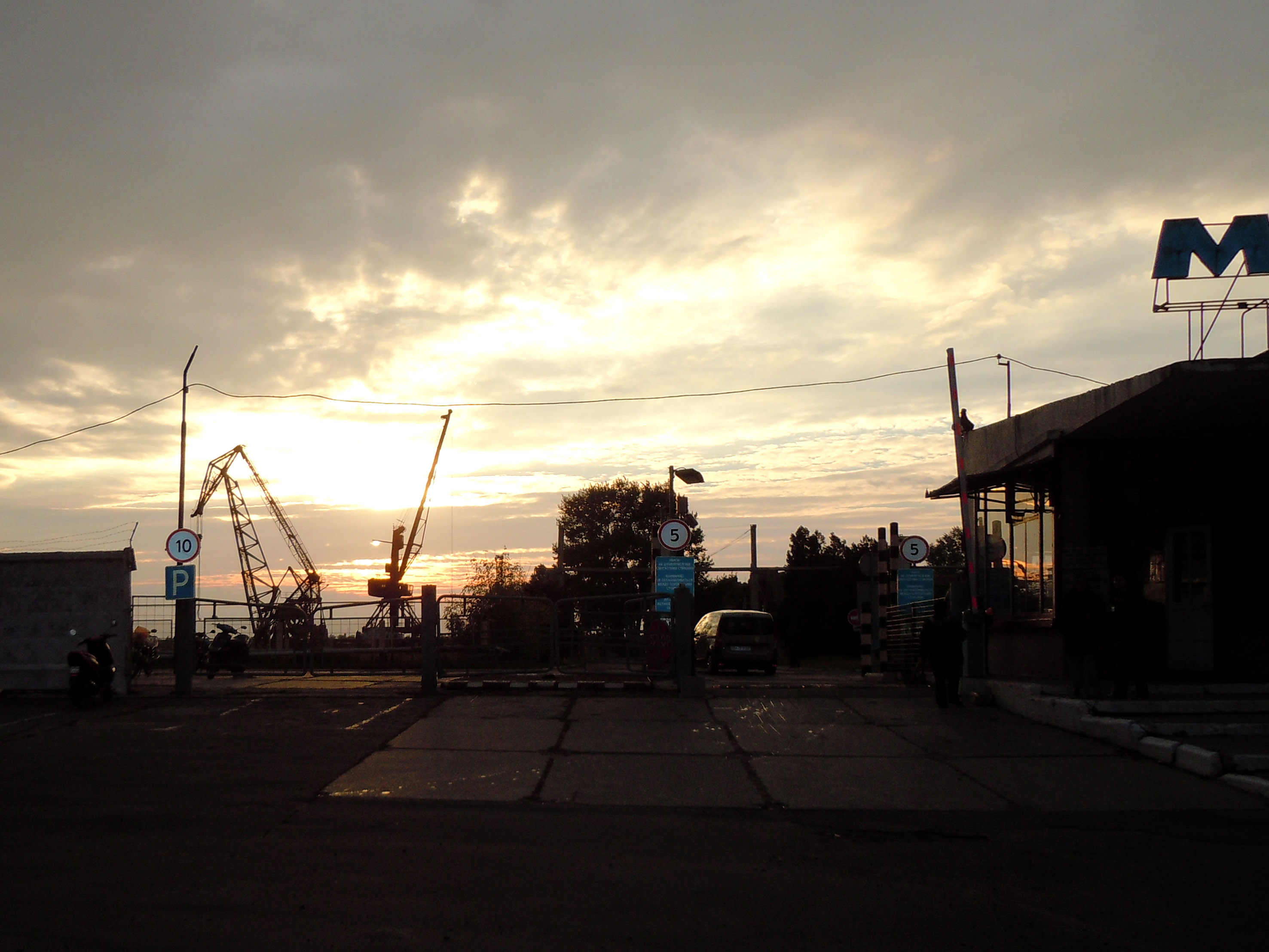
Port entrance

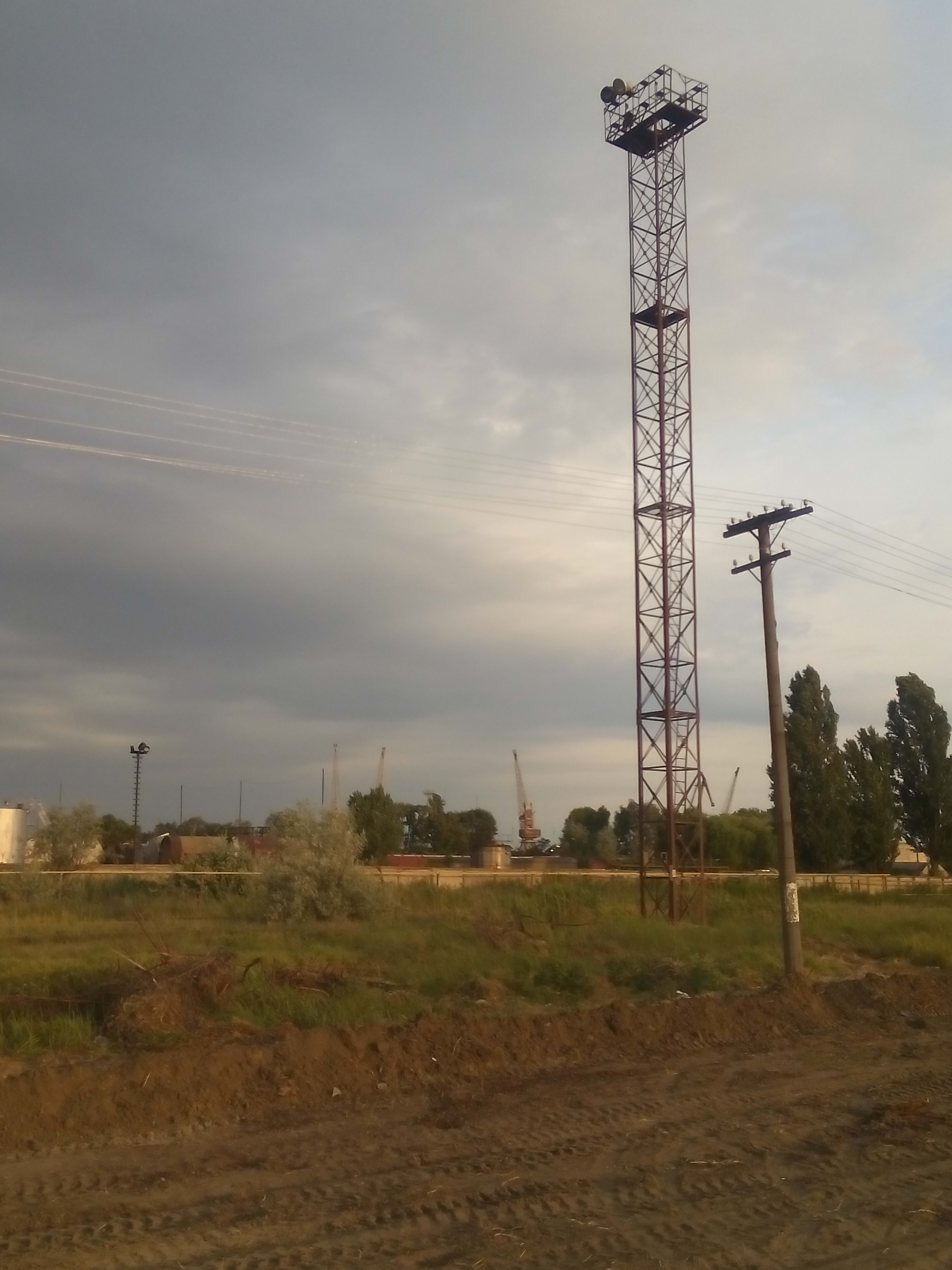
Tower

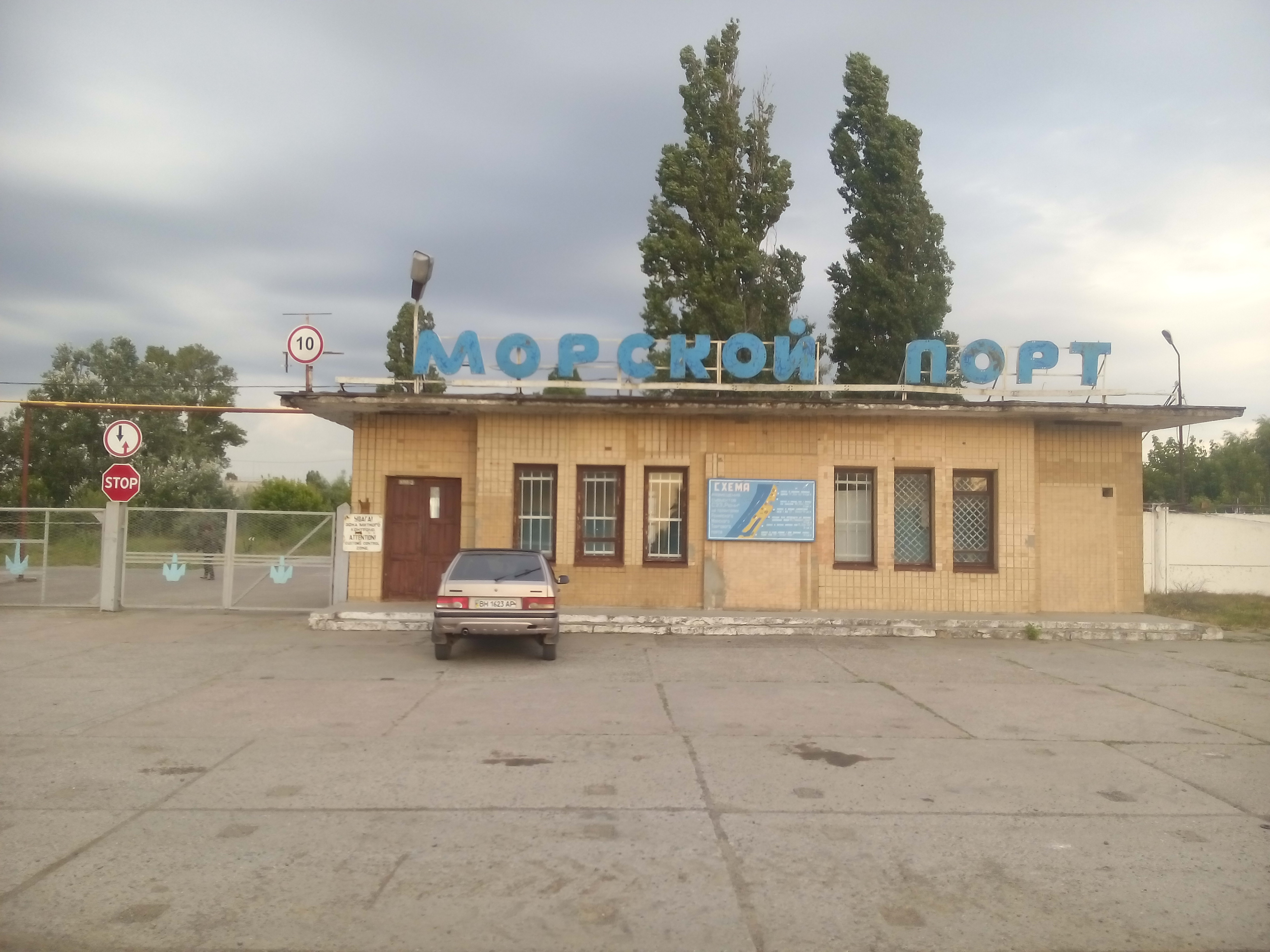
Main entrance

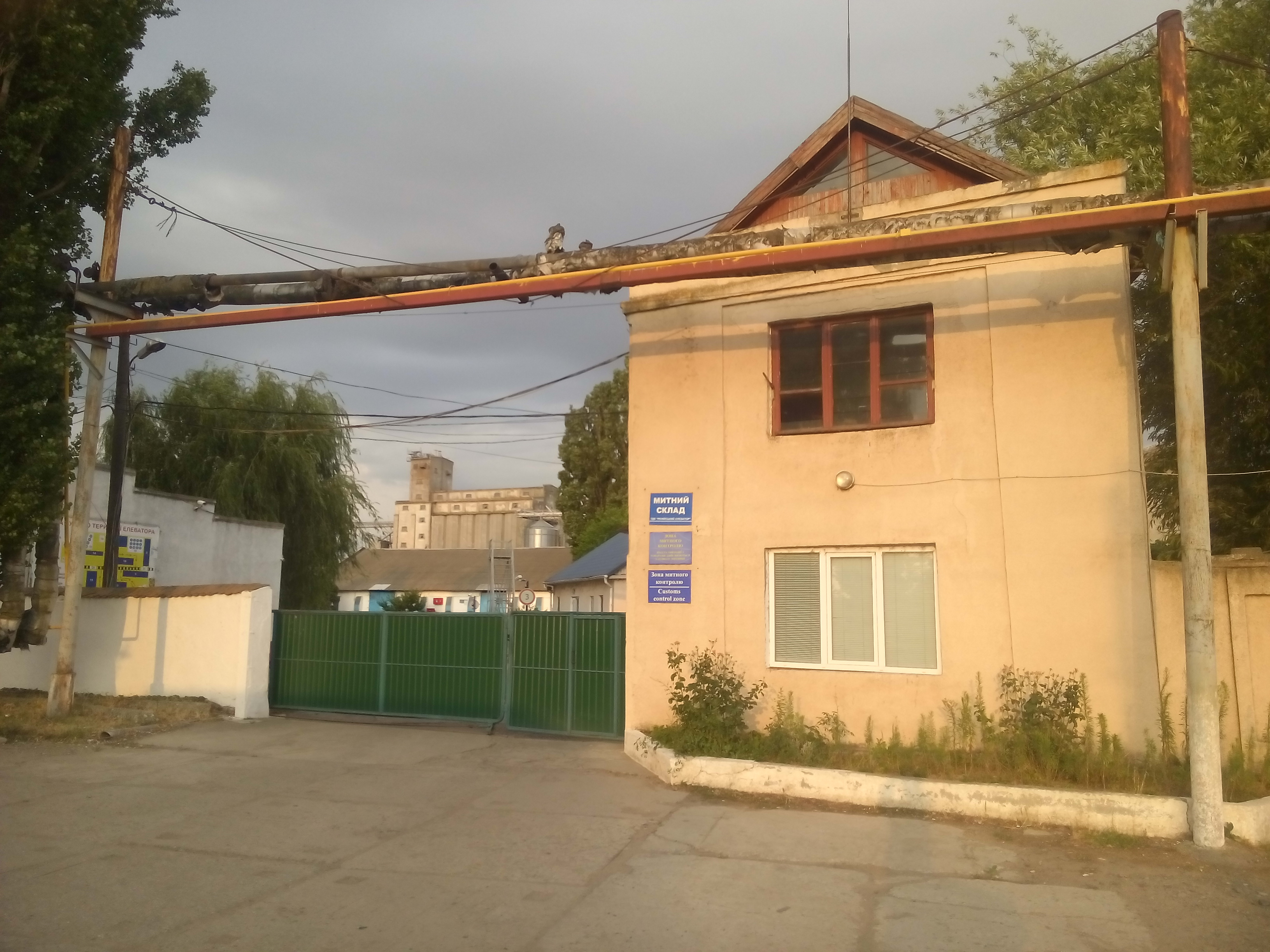
Customs gate

== See also ==
- List of ports in Ukraine
- Transport in Ukraine
