= Port of Mykolaiv =

Commercial seaport in Ukraine

Coordinates: 46°57′02.4″N 32°00′17.1″E

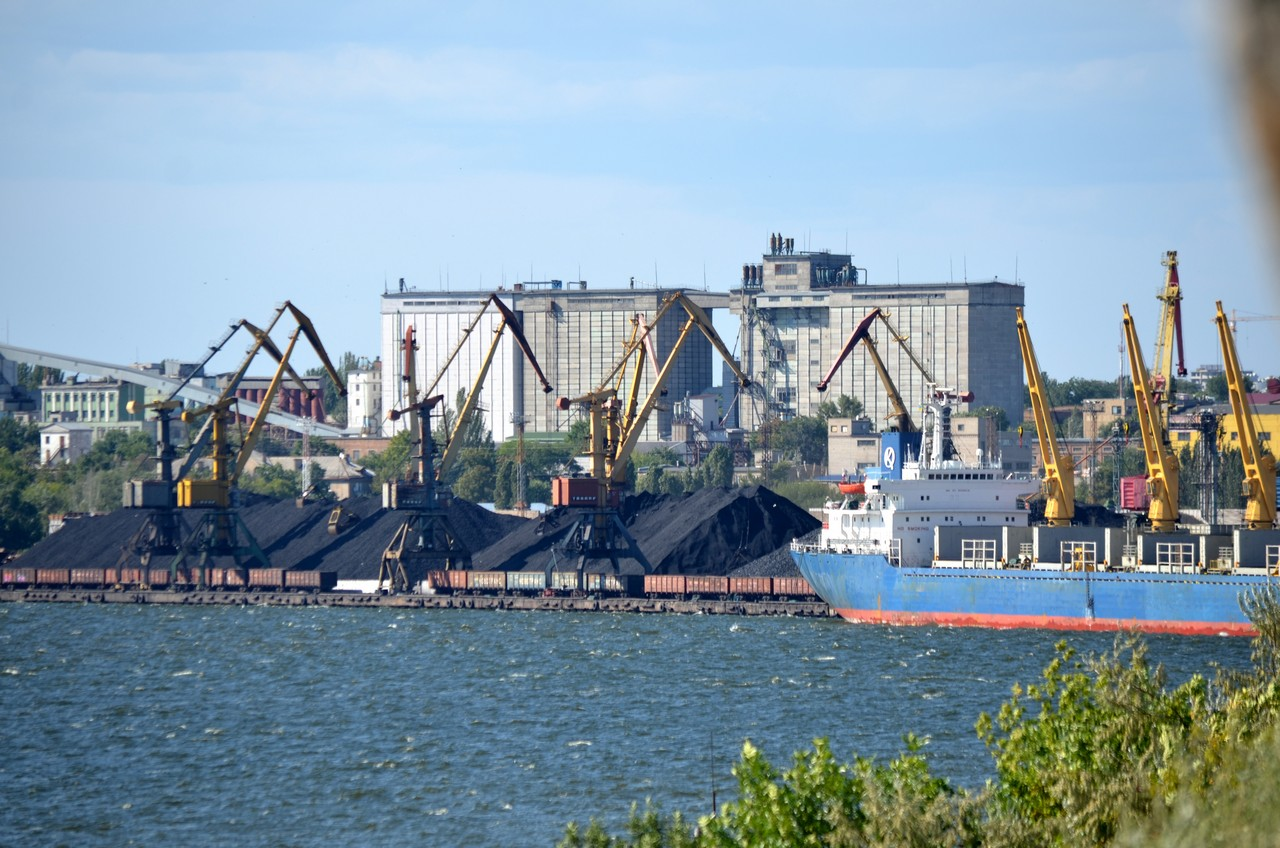
- Mykolaivsky Seaport in springtime – April 2013.
- Interactive map of Port of Mykolaiv
- Native name: Миколаївський морський торговельний порт

Location
- Country: Ukraine
- Location: Mykolaiv, Mykolaiv Oblast

Details
- Opened: 1862
- Operated by: Ministry of Infrastructure (Ukraine)
- No. of berths: 23
- Employees: 592 (2020)
- Acting Chief of Administration of the Seaport: Mykhailo Anatoliyovych Melnichenko

Statistics
- Annual cargo tonnage: 23,534.80 thousand tons
- Website; Port Administration Site

The Mykolaiv Sea Commercial Port (formerly Nikolaev SCP from Russian: Николаев, romanized: Nikolaev, lit. 'Nikolay's') is one of the leading state enterprises in the transport sector of Ukraine for processing, exports, imports, and cabotage cargo, that provides transit transportation of various cargoes, both general and bulk. According to the Law of Ukraine "About seaports of Ukraine" functions of the Mikolaiv Seaport Authority are carried out by the Mikolaiv branch of the state enterprise of the Ukrainian Sea Ports Authority.

In 2013, as a result of the reform of the maritime sector of Ukraine, the state enterprise "Ukrainian Sea Ports Authority" was established to manage state property in seaports and its effective use, create mechanisms to attract investment in the port infrastructure for its development and stable business. Among other tasks, the USPA maintains passage depths of port waters, ensures safety of navigation, and more.

Mykolaiv Seaport is one of the budget-generating enterprises of the region. It is one of the three most powerful seaports in Ukraine in terms of cargo handling by terminal operators, and it is included in the list of enterprises of strategic importance for Ukraine's economy.

== Gallery ==
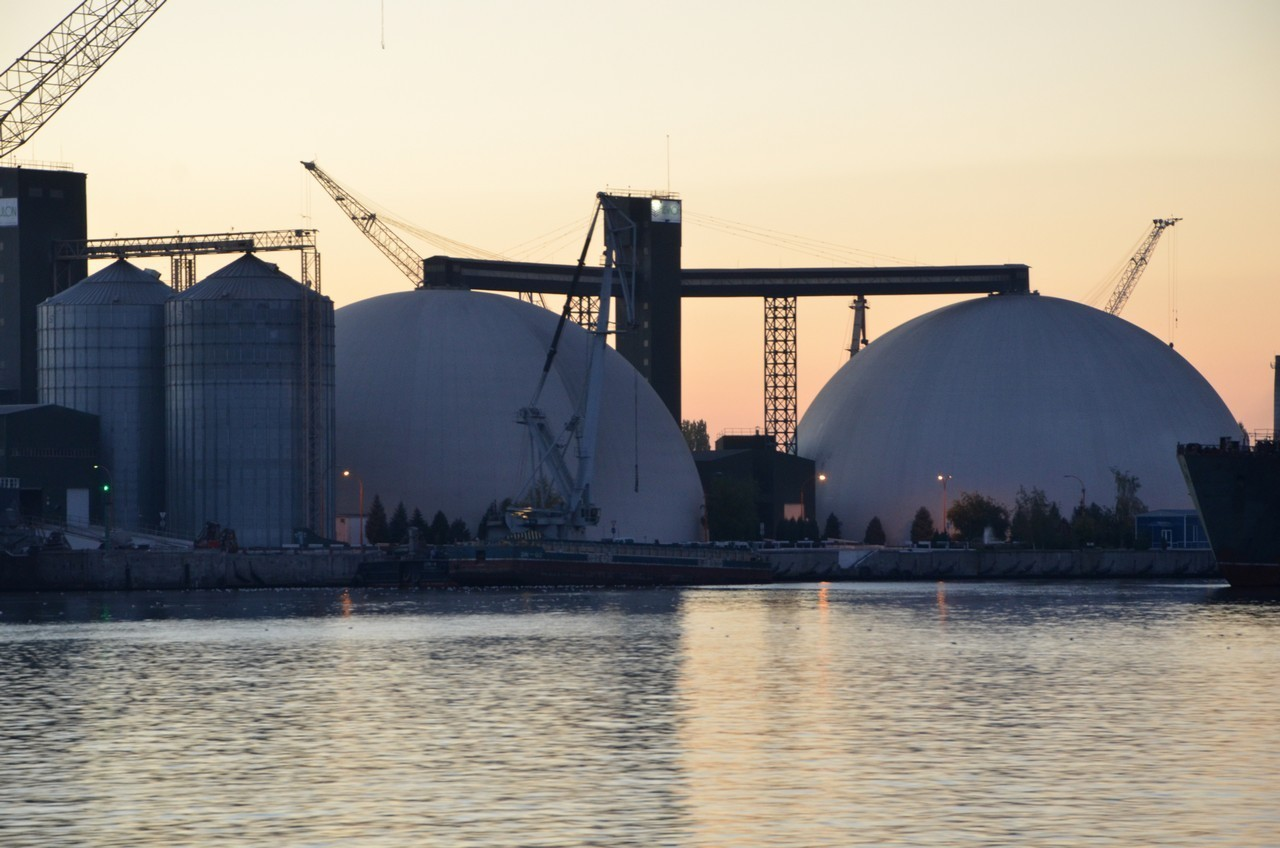
Port of Mykolaiv, 2013.

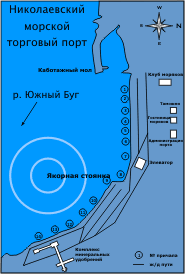
Nikolaev Sea Commercial Port, 2015.

== See also ==
- List of ports in Ukraine
- Transport in Ukraine
