= Vitaliy Kropachov =

Ukrainian businessman (born 1973)

- Віталій Кропачов
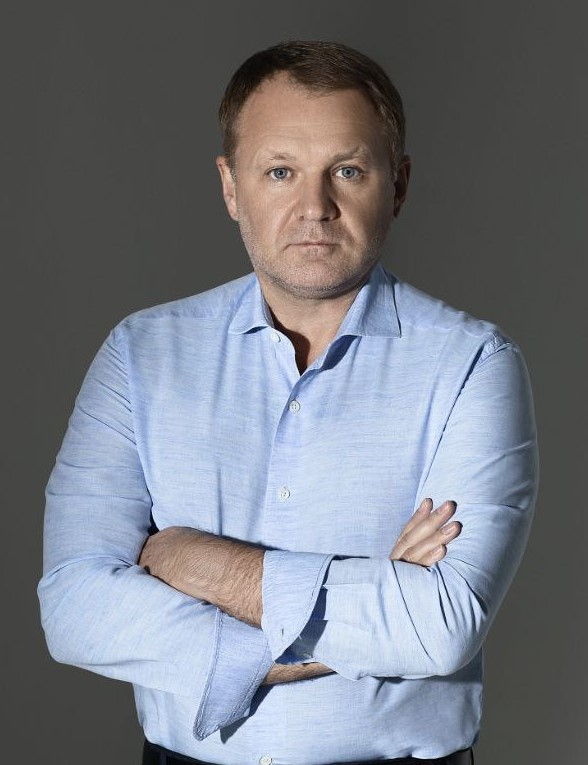
- Kropachov in c. 2023
- Born: 4 October 1973 (age 53); Torez, Donetsk Oblast, Ukrainian SSR, Soviet Union
- Occupation: Businessman
- Organization: Ukrdoninvest Group
- Spouse: Married
- Children: 2

Vitaliy Valeriyovych Kropachov (Ukrainian: Віталій Валерійович Кропачов, romanized: Vitalii Valeriiovych Kropachov; born 4 October 1973) is a Ukrainian businessman and owner of the Ukrdoninvest Group of companies (coal business and gas production), has assets in the machine-building, construction, and transport industries, as well as media assets, including ERA Production and the Ukraine World News television channel.

== Biography ==
Born on 4 October 1973, in the city of Torez, Donetsk Oblast.

In 2010, he was elected as a deputy to the Donetsk Regional Council.

In 2011, he survived an assassination attempt, which he linked to attempts by structures associated with Oleksandr Yanukovych to seize his business. Before the start of the War in Donbas, he was considered one of the wealthiest businessmen in Torez, owning the coal logistics companies "Snizhnepohruztrans" and "Torezpohruztrans," as well as the Torez Hard Alloys Plant. According to Kropachov, these assets were "nationalized" by a decree from the leader of the so-called "DPR," Alexander Zakharchenko. Since 2014, he has been living with his family in Kyiv.

In 2014, he participated in the formation of the "Shakhtarsk" battalion along with the leader of the Radical Party Oleh Lyashko, advisor to the Minister of Internal Affairs Anton Herashchenko, and then-Interior Minister Arsen Avakov. In July 2014, he provided evidence to Kyiv regarding the downing of Flight MH17 by Russian-backed forces, including photos of a Russian Buk missile system in occupied Snizhne and the contrail from the missile. He assisted in evacuating the authors of the photographs from the temporarily occupied territory. In the same year, he ran for the Verkhovna Rada (8th convocation) in the 53rd single-mandate district.

Between 2016 and 2017, he acquired several coal processing plants: "Rossiya" ("Kotliarevska"), "Ukraina," and "Komsomolska." In 2017, he purchased a controlling stake in LLC "Krasnolymanske" from Ihor Humeniuk, which mines coal at the Krasnolymanska mine under a public-private partnership. By 2018, the mine provided 45% of the coal supplies for Centrenergo and became the fourth largest taxpayer in Donetsk Oblast.

In 2017, he began collaborating with the Chinese mechanical engineering company Sany Heavy Industry. Together, they won numerous tenders for state-owned mines, competing with Rinat Akhmetov's Corum Group. Kropachov expressed intentions to localize the production of Chinese mining equipment in Ukraine.

In 2019, Kropachov was first included in the ranking of the wealthiest Ukrainians by NV magazine. With a fortune of $101 million, he ranked 63rd. In 2020, his assets were valued at $81 million (96th place).

== Business ==
=== Ukrdoninvest ===
The Ukrdoninvest Group, owned by Vitaliy Kropachov, is one of the largest Ukrainian investors in the field of natural resource extraction. It is a major coal supplier for Centrenergo power stations.

In August 2021, Ukrdoninvest acquired the "Dymytrovvuhlevantazhtrans" industrial railway transport complex in Myrnohrad for 301 million UAH via a privatization auction. In December 2022, the company reached an agreement to buy 24.9% of corporate rights in "Shakhta 1-3 Novohrodivska" for 50 million UAH.

In January 2023, Ukrdoninvest participated in the privatization auction for the Ust-Danube Commercial Seaport. On 13 March 2023, the group won the auction for the Bilhorod-Dnistrovskyi Commercial Sea Port with a bid of 220 million UAH.

The group also owns the "Bohucharska" mining and processing plant.

Between 2023 and 2025, Ukrdoninvest developed projects for a wind farm in Chernivtsi Oblast with a capacity of up to 75 kW, as well as the development of mini-blocks for point-of-use electricity supply and storage systems. In partnership with Siemens, a project was prepared to build electric vehicle charging networks in Austria, Ukraine, Italy, and Georgia, with each station featuring eight 300 kW charging units.

=== Media Assets ===
In 2019, Kropachov acquired the TV channels Info 24, TVi, and Pohoda.

On 17 December 2021, his company "Ukrdoninvest Media" purchased "Era Production," a digital multiplex operator with a license to broadcast 12 programs.

In July 2022, Ukrdoninvest Media became the sole beneficiary of "Corona Sunrise" LLC, which holds the digital license for 4 Kanal. In October 2022, the National Council of Television and Radio Broadcasting of Ukraine rebranded the license as "Tak TV." On 22 January 2023, Kropachov launched the national news channel Ukraine World News.

== Charity ==
In the summer of 2022, he organized a camp for internally displaced persons (IDPs) near Pereiaslav, housing several hundred people from Kramatorsk, Bakhmut, Sloviansk, Lysychansk, Lyman, Toretsk, Izium, and Mariupol. In January 2023, he signed a Memorandum of Cooperation with the Kyiv Oblast State Administration to provide the camp with medical equipment.

Following the missile strike on the Kyiv TV Tower on 1 March 2022, Kropachov provided his own equipment to ensure the uninterrupted broadcast of television signals. His company "Era Production" supported the signal for major broadcasters of the national telethon, including 1+1 and Suspilne, for two months until April 30.

In 2023, Ukrdoninvest initiated a project to create residential complexes integrated with industrial production cycles to encourage Ukrainians abroad to return home. The pilot project was planned for Kyiv Oblast.

== Views ==
In a 2023 interview with European media, he stated that European countries would compete to keep Ukrainian refugees, making the search for incentives for their return a primary task for Ukraine's post-war recovery. He also called for the development of high-value-added industries and emphasized alternative energy solutions.

== Family ==
He is married and has a daughter and a son.
