= Bilhorod-Dnistrovskyi Seaport =

Coordinates: 46.183°N 30.375°E

Seaport Bilhorod-Dnistrovskyi
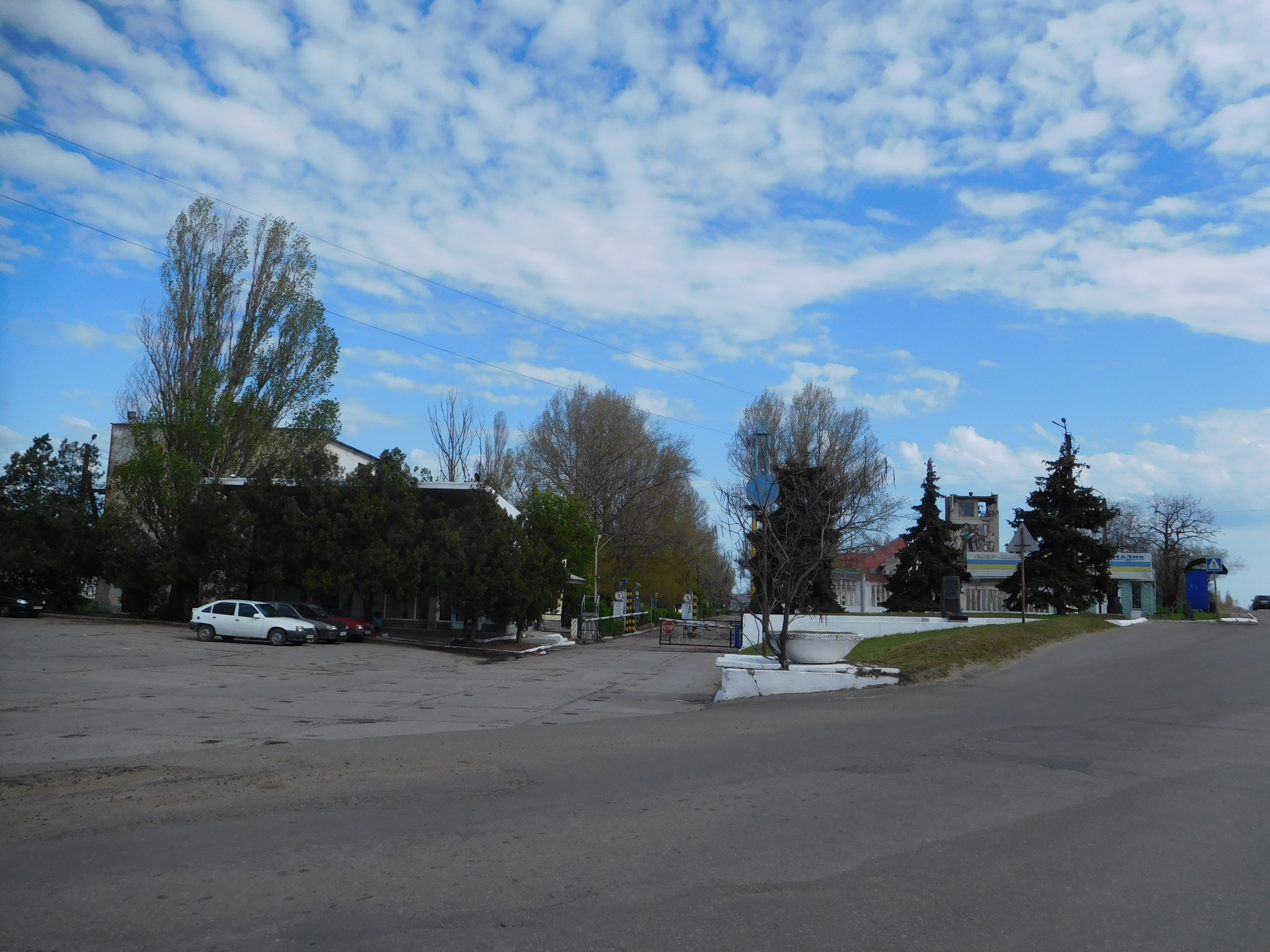
- Interactive map of Seaport Bilhorod-Dnistrovskyi

Location
- Country: Ukraine
- Location: Bilhorod-Dnistrovskyi, Odesa Oblast

Details
- Operated by: Ukrainian Sea Ports Authority and private stevedores
- Owned by: Top-Offer LLC (private)
- Type of harbour: Natural/Artificial
- Size of harbour: 8,400 ha (32 sq mi)
- Size: 64,411 ha (248.69 sq mi)
- No. of piers: 9; 1 (at Buhaz)

Statistics
- Annual cargo tonnage: 1,000,000+
- employees: 784(2009)
- Website www.uspa.gov.ua/bgd/

The Seaport Bilhorod-Dnistrovskyi (Ukrainian: Морський порт "Білгород-Дністровський") is a seaport in the city of Bilhorod-Dnistrovskyi, Ukraine. It is located on the north-western shore of Black Sea at Dniester Estuary, to the south-west from Odesa.

Bilhorod-Dnistrovskyi Seaport is mainly a freight seaport. The port covers some 64.5 thousands hectares. Port also has a special port "Buhaz" with a single pier. The Bilhorod-Dnistrovskyi Seaport has an area of 14,700 m^{2} (158,000 sq ft) for covered storage and 192,180 m^{2} (2,068,600 sq ft) for open storage. The total length of a pier complex is 1,225.9 m (4,022 ft). Upon the entrance to the Dniester estuary, a local bridge allows 28 m (92 ft) of clearance for the incoming ships.

Port "Buhaz" is located in a somewhat remote location from the main port in the rural settlement of Zatoka in Karolino-Buhaz rural hromada.

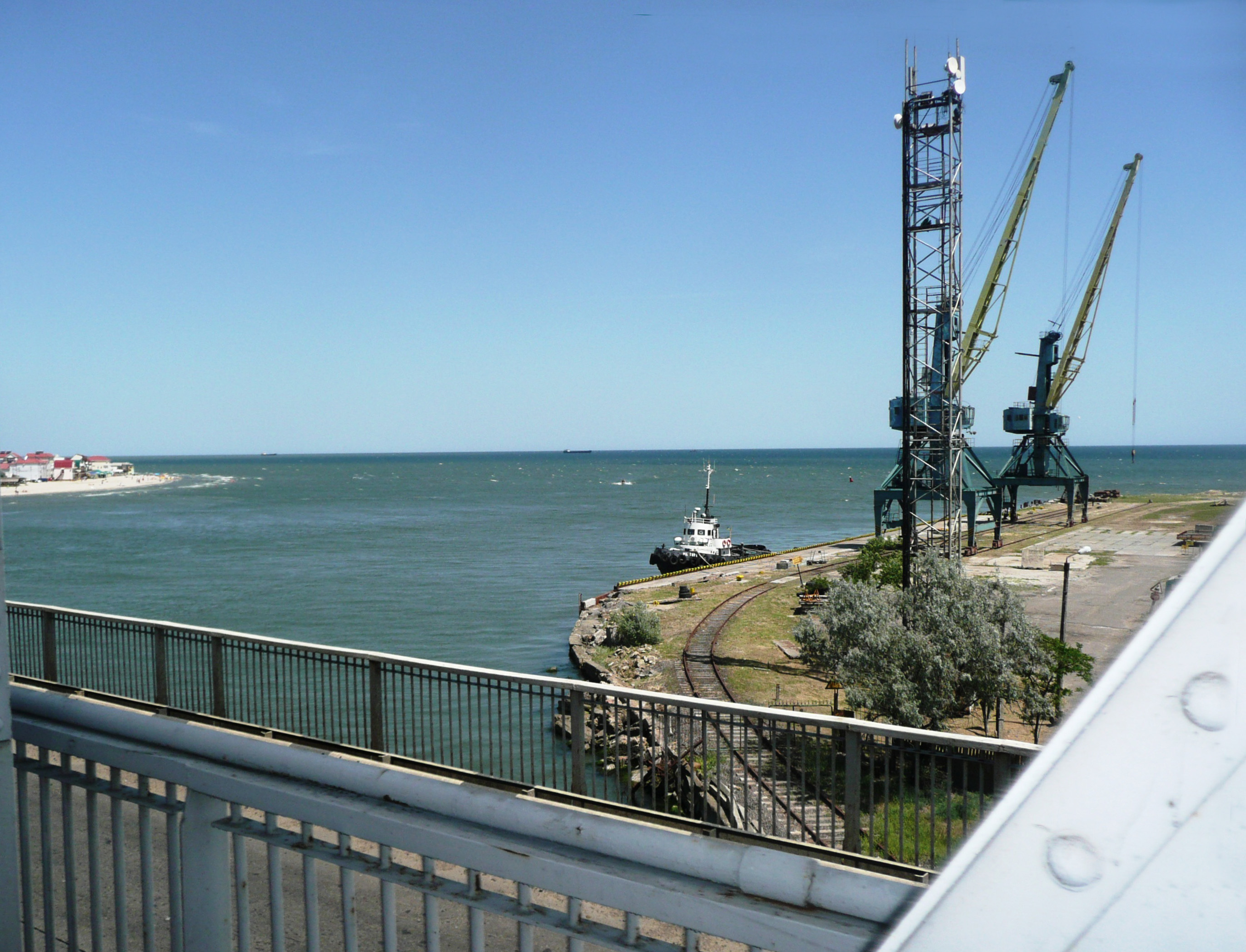
Dniester-Tsaregradsky-duct-4

== Privatization ==
In 2024, the State Property Fund of Ukraine announced it was attempting to privatize the seaport, after multiple failed tenders in 2023 as the eventual winner, Vitaliy Kropachov's Ukrdoninvest, did not complete the purchase. The winning bid was placed in November 2024 on its thirteenth attempt for 108 million UAH to the company Top-Offer, whose beneficial owner is former Boxing Federation of Ukraine president Volodymyr Prodyvus. However, a final contraction still needed to be signed with documentation, which was given a deadline of March 2025, in addition to needing additional verification of the buyer and origin of funds as the beneficial ownership changed during the auction. At the time, if completed, it would be only the second successful port privatization in Ukraine after the Ust-Danube Commercial Seaport in 2023. In August 2025 it was officially announced that the transfer of ownership was completed.
