= Chernihiv River Port =

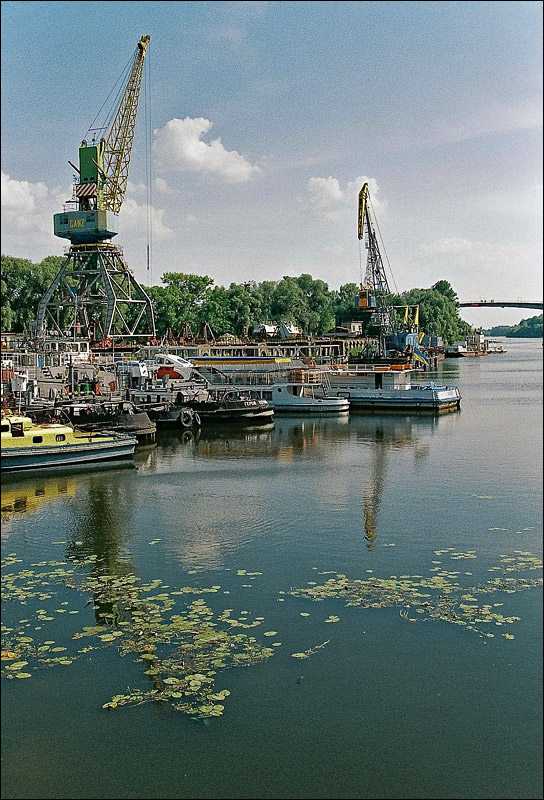
- Chernihiv River Port in 2008
- Interactive map of Chernihiv River Port
- Native name: Чернігівський річковий порт

Location
- Country: Ukraine
- Location: Chernihiv, Pidval'na Street, 23
- Coordinates: 51°29′10.15″N 31°18′38.87″E

Details
- Opened: 1964
- Operated by: Ukrrichflot
- Owned by: Konstantin Grigorishin
- Size: 20 hectares
- General director: Oleh Yurchenko

Statistics
- Website chernigivriverport.pat.ua

Chernihiv River Port is a port enterprise on the Desna River. It is located in the regional center of Chernihiv Oblast, in Chernihiv, Ukraine. It has the status of OJSC.

== See also ==
- Siege of Chernihiv
- Cargo turnover of Ukrainian ports

== Gallery ==
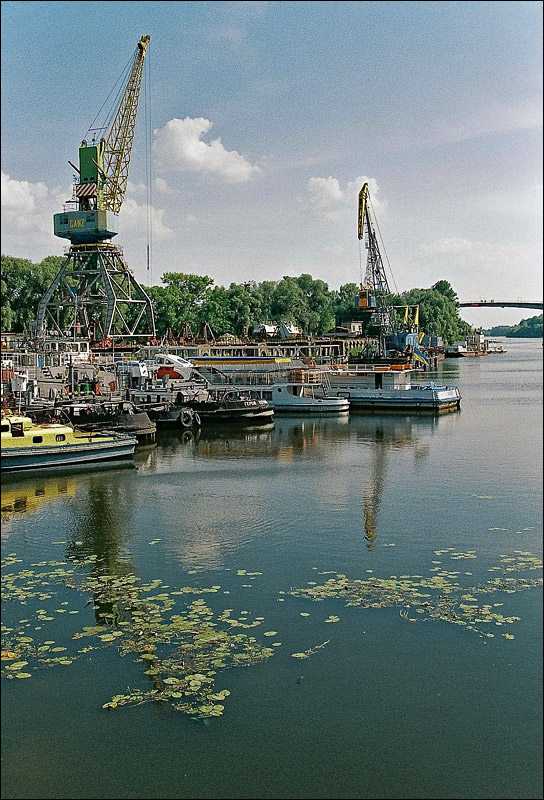

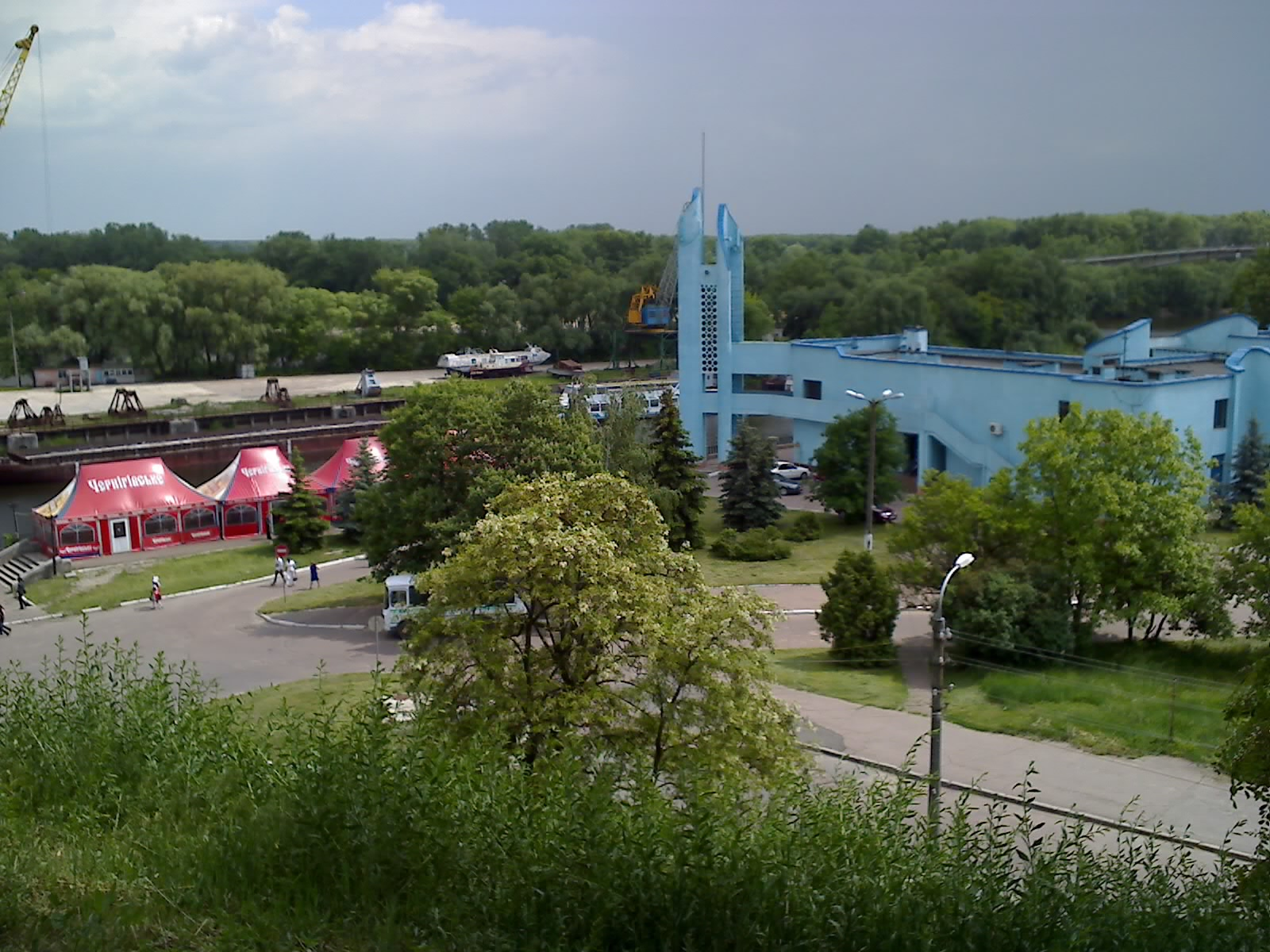
