= Autolux Bus =

Autolux
- Industry: Passenger transport
- Founded: 1997; 29 years ago
- Headquarters: Ukraine
- Website: autolux.ua

Autolux is a Ukrainian cargo and passenger transportation company founded in 1997. The company services passengers throughout Ukraine, and delivers cargo internationally through partnerships with other countries.

== History ==
Autolux was founded in 1997 by the company AAZ Trading Co. Initially, its cargo transportation service was domestic only. Later, international mail delivery was introduced after partnering with other companies.

== Services ==
Autolux has 180 trucks for cargo transportation services, while passenger services operate 50 buses in Ukraine.

Autolux also publishes a free magazine, printing 12,000 copies per month, which are distributed to passengers. Its offices and major maintenance hangars are located in Kyiv.

== Destinations ==
The Autolux passenger bus services the following cities and intermediate locations:

- Kyiv – Boryspil – Poltava – Kharkiv.
- Boryspil – Kyiv – Lviv.
- Kyiv – Odesa.
- Kyiv – Boryspil – Poltava – Dnipro – Zaporizhzhia.
