= Ust-Danube Commercial Seaport =

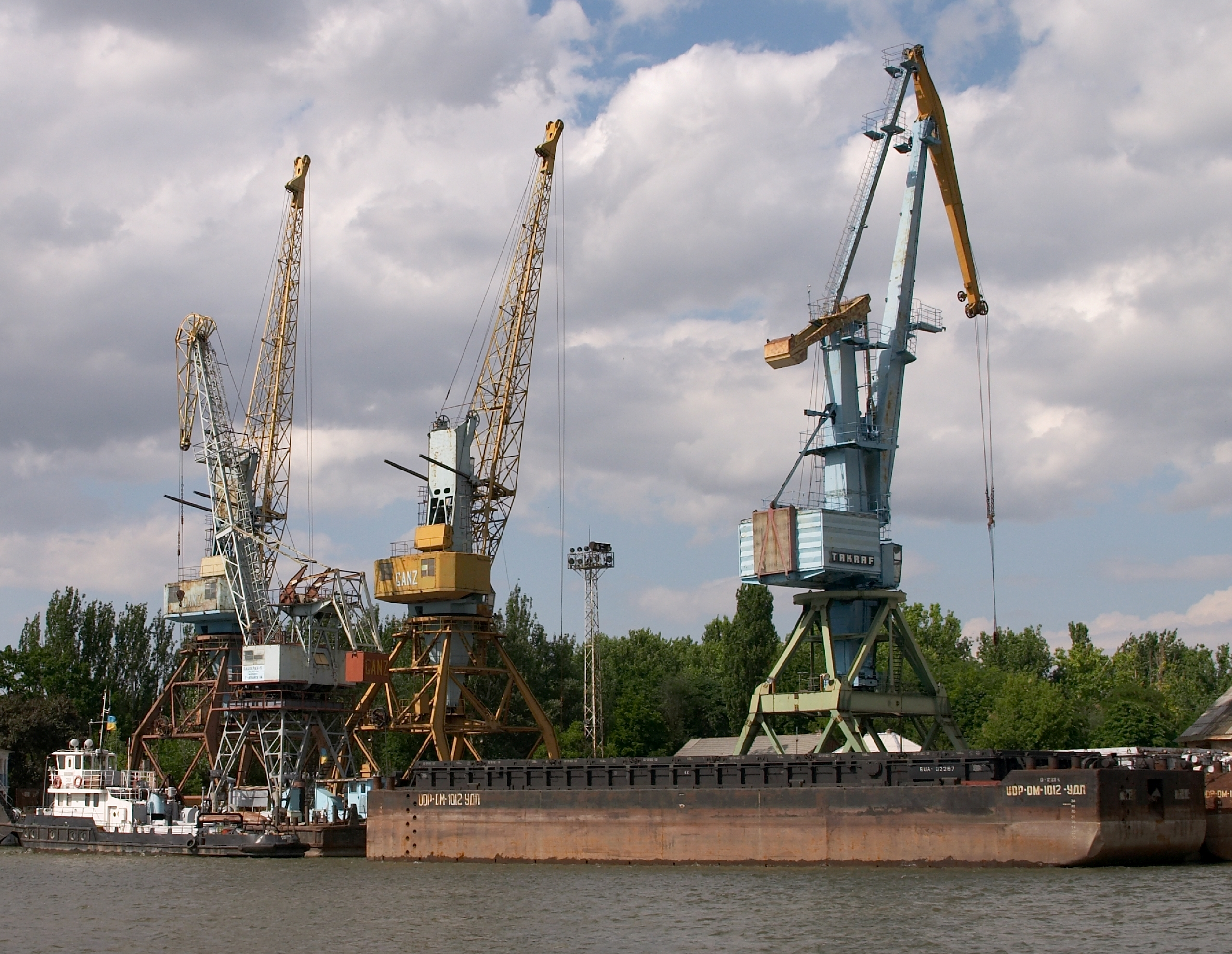
- Interactive map of Ust-Danube Commercial Seaport
- Native name: Морський торговельний порт "Усть-Дунайськ"

Location
- Country: Ukraine
- Location: Vylkove, Prydunaysʹka Street, 2, Odesa Oblast
- Coordinates: 45°28′1.1748″N 29°42′42.7464″E

Details
- Opened: 1970s
- Owned by: state enterprise
- Size of harbour: 60 hectares
- Land area: 15 hectares
- Director of the Port: Oleksandr Popov
- Length of the approach channel: 7 км
- Width of the approach channel: 80-100 м
- Depth of the approach channel: 8 м

Statistics
- Website http://ust-dunaysk.com

The Ust-Danube Commercial Seaport (Ukrainian: Морський торговельний порт "Усть-Дунайськ", romanized: Morskyi torgovelnyi port 'Ust-Dunaisk') is a state-owned enterprise of the Ukrainian transport system, located in the southern part of the Zhebriyansʹka Bay of the Black Sea and at the mouth of the Ochakiv estuary of the Danube Delta. The port administration is located in Vylkove, Odesa Oblast. According to the Law of Ukraine "On Seaports of Ukraine," the functions of the seaport administration are performed by the Ust-Danube branch of the state enterprise of the Ukrainian Sea Ports Authority.

On March 13, 2023, the port was sold for 220 million hryvnias to businessman Vitaliy Kropachov's Ukrdoninvest group of companies.

== See also ==
- List of ports in Ukraine
- Transport in Ukraine
