= Transport in Ukraine =

Overview of transport systems in Ukraine

Transport in Ukraine includes ground transportation (road and rail), water (sea and river), air transportation, and pipelines. The transportation sector accounts for roughly 11% of the country's gross domestic product and 7% of total employment.

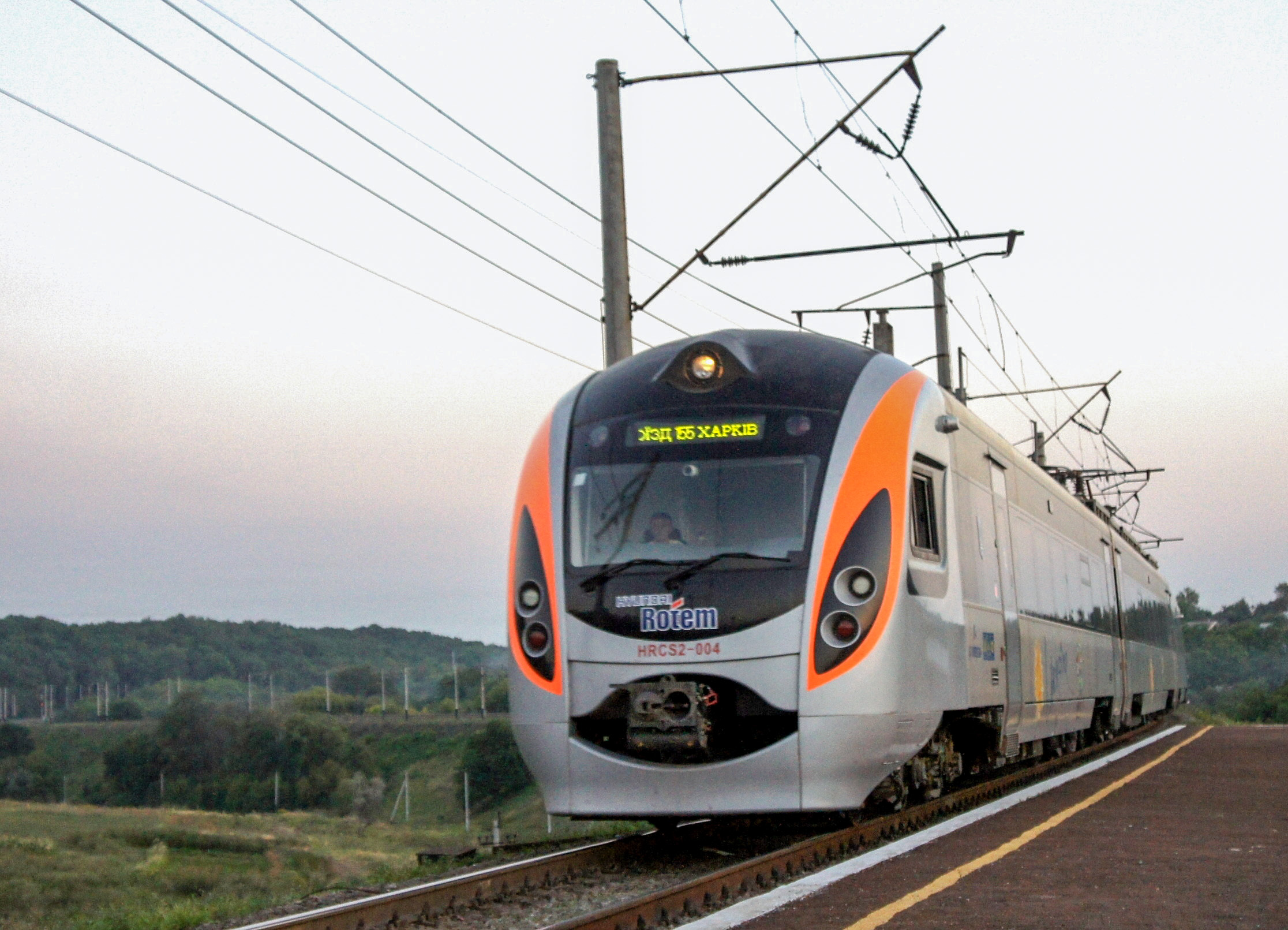
HRCS2 multiple unit. Rail transport is heavily utilised in Ukraine.

In total, Ukrainian paved roads stretch for 164,732 kilometres (102,360 mi). Major routes, marked with the letter 'M' for 'International' (Ukrainian: Міжнародний), extend nationwide and connect all major cities of Ukraine, and provide cross-border routes to the country's neighbours.

International maritime travel is mainly provided through the Port of Odesa, from where ferries sail regularly to Istanbul, Varna and Haifa. The largest ferry company presently operating these routes is Ukrferry.

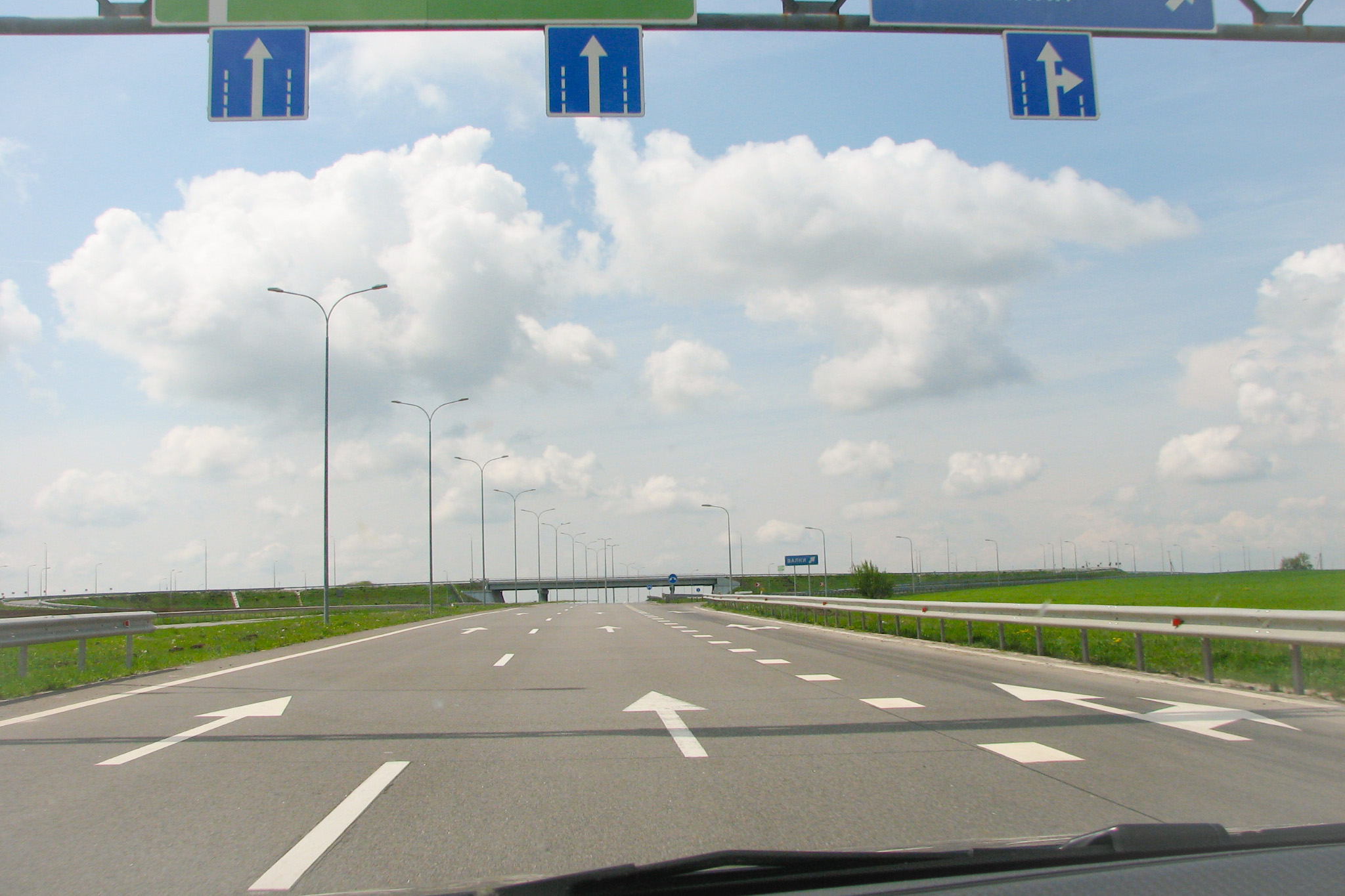
The Kharkiv–Dnipro motorway (M18)

Rail transport in Ukraine connects all major urban areas, port facilities and industrial centres with neighbouring countries. The heaviest concentration of railway track is the Donbas region of Ukraine. Although rail freight transport fell in the 1990s, Ukraine is still one of the world's highest rail users.

The total amount of railroad track in Ukraine extends for 22,473 kilometres (13,964 mi), of which 9,250 kilometres (5,750 mi) was electrified in the 2000s. The state has a monopoly on the provision of passenger rail transport, and all trains, other than those with cooperation of other foreign companies on international routes, are operated by its company Ukrzaliznytsia.

Kyiv Boryspil is Ukraine's largest international airport. It has three main passenger terminals and is the base for the country's flag carrier, Ukraine International Airlines. Other large airports in the country include those in Kharkiv, Lviv and Donetsk (now destroyed). In addition to its flag carrier, Ukraine has a number of airlines including Windrose Airlines, Dniproavia, Azur Air Ukraine, and AtlasGlobal Ukraine. Antonov Airlines, a subsidiary of the Antonov Aerospace Design Bureau, was the only operator of the world's largest fixed wing aircraft, the An-225.

== Wartime developments (2022–present) ==
Following the Russian invasion of Ukraine that began on 24 February 2022, Ukraine's transport sector has undergone significant disruption and adaptation. Civilian airspace remains closed to all flights, with major airports including Kyiv Boryspil, Kharkiv, and Lviv suspended indefinitely. The Antonov An-225 Mriya was destroyed at Hostomel Airport during the initial invasion in February 2022.

Maritime exports initially halted due to Black Sea blockades but resumed via the Ukrainian Maritime Export Corridor established in August 2023, enabling cargo shipments along the western Black Sea coast with support from Romania and Bulgaria. Seaports handled 82.2 million tonnes of cargo in 2025, reaching 95.3% of annual targets despite ongoing attacks.

Rail transport, operated by Ukrzaliznytsia, remains critical for both civilian mobility and freight. Approximately 30% of the network has sustained damage, but freight volumes increased 18% in 2024, with ongoing track repairs and European-gauge conversion projects (including the Chop–Uzhhorod line) advancing integration with the EU's Trans-European Transport Network (TEN-T). The World Bank estimates $77.5 billion will be needed for transport sector reconstruction over 2024–2034.

== Economy ==
=== Transport infrastructure ===
Ukraine's transport infrastructure has faced significant challenges since the Russian invasion began in February 2022. Pre-war assessments noted that the sector generally met only basic economic needs, with safety, efficiency, and environmental standards lagging behind European benchmarks. Wartime damage has affected approximately 30% of rail infrastructure and numerous road bridges, with total verified transport sector losses estimated at $36.7 billion as of 2024. A joint assessment by the EU, UN and the World Bank estimated that as of the end of 2025, recovery and reconstruction over the following decade will cost approximately $588 billion. Funding for this reconstruction will be sourced from international partners—including governments, financial institutions, and donors.

=== International transport corridors ===
Ukraine's geographical position has historically supported several international transport corridors. Pre-2022 frameworks included:

- Pan-European transport corridors № 3, 5, 7, and 9;
- Rail Co-Operation Corridors (ORC) № 3, 4, 5, 7, 8, and 10;
- The TRACECA (Europe–Caucasus–Asia) corridor.

In 2024, Ukraine was formally integrated into the European Union's revised Trans-European Transport Network (TEN-T), which supersedes earlier corridor frameworks and provides access to EU connectivity funding. Four TEN-T core network corridors now include Ukrainian territory:

- North Sea–Baltic Corridor (via Poland);
- Rhine–Danube Corridor (via Romania);
- Mediterranean Corridor (via Hungary/Slovakia);
- Baltic–Black Sea–Aegean Corridor (newly established).

This integration prioritizes gauge-compatibility projects (e.g., standard-gauge extensions at western border crossings), digital customs systems, and multimodal hubs to facilitate Ukraine's economic alignment with EU markets. In May 2026, Ukraine and Bosnia and Herzegovina agreed to establish the Ukraine–Bosnia and Herzegovina transport visa-free regime for bilateral and transit freight transport, beginning on 1 January 2027.

=== Transport industry ===
The transport sector accounted for approximately 5.4% of Ukraine's GDP in 2021, though wartime disruptions have significantly altered sectoral contributions since 2022. Employment in transport represented roughly 8% of total employment pre-invasion, with shifts toward rail and maritime logistics supporting wartime supply chains.

Following the Russian invasion of Ukraine in February 2022, freight and passenger volumes experienced sharp declines due to infrastructure damage, occupation of territory, and security constraints. However, adaptive measures—including the Ukrainian Maritime Export Corridor (established August 2023) and intensified rail freight operations—enabled partial recovery. In 2024, rail freight volumes increased by 18% year-on-year to 174.9 million tonnes, while seaports handled 82.2 million tonnes of cargo in 2025, reaching 95.3% of annual targets despite ongoing attacks.

Pre-war statistics (2000–2008) remain useful baseline data but do not reflect current operational realities. The World Bank estimates $77.5 billion will be required for transport sector reconstruction over 2024–2034, prioritizing European integration, multimodal connectivity, and climate-resilient infrastructure.

Freight and Passenger Transportation Statistics

Note: Figures reflect pre-war operational capacity (2000–2008). Current volumes are affected by ongoing conflict, territorial changes, and adaptive logistics strategies.
	Transported tons of freights	Freight kilometres (thousand)	Transported passengers (thousand)	Passenger kilometres (thousand)
2000	938,916.1	19,281,619.3	2,603,804.6	29,381,541.2
2002	947,263.8	20,593,133.1	3,069,136.3	35,812,231.1
2004	1,027,396.3	28,847,143.4	3,720,326.4	47,490,401.3
2006	1,167,199.6	40,566,469.9	3,987,982.2	53,981,705.3
2008	1,266,598.1	54,877,223.3	4,369,125.5	61,302,884.5

== Rail ==
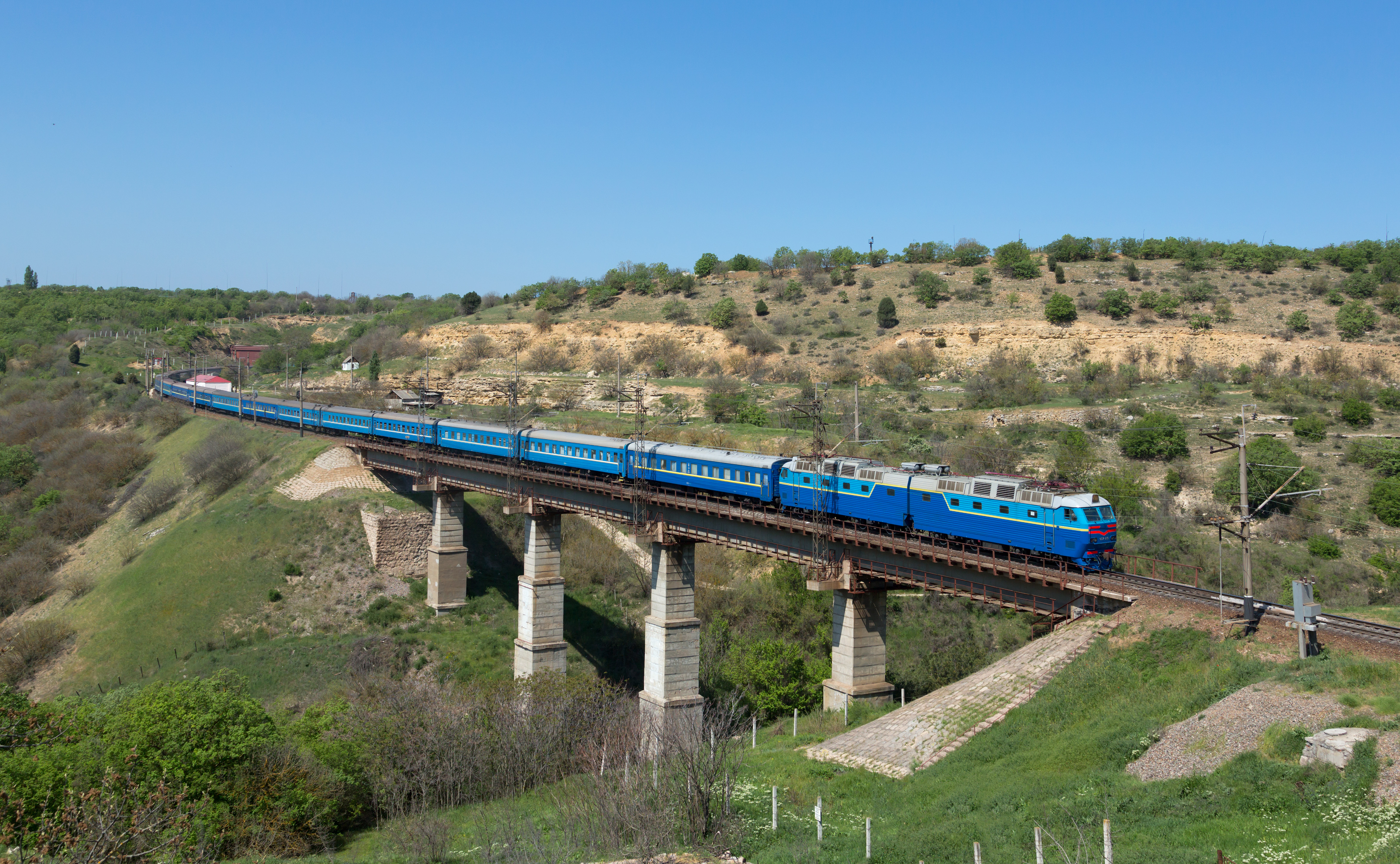
A sleeping train in Ukraine's Crimea region.

The public railways in Ukraine are managed by the state railway company Ukrzaliznytsia.

=== Network length (2010) ===
The length of the railway network Ukraine ranks third in Europe (21.700 kilometres of track).

- 22,000 km (13,670 mi) broad gauge of 1,520 mm (4 ft 11 27/32 in), ~10,000 km (6,214 mi) electrified (3 kV DC and 25 kV AC)
- 201 km (125 mi) of 1,435 mm (4 ft 8 1/2 in) standard gauge, electrified

=== Rail links with adjacent countries ===
- Belarus
- Russia (suspended due to conflict)
- Moldova
- Romania (break-of-gauge: 1,520 mm (4 ft 11 27/32 in) / 1,435 mm (4 ft 8 1/2 in))
- Sportyvna station on the Kholodnohirsko–Zavodska metro line in Kharkiv
  Hungary (break-of-gauge: 1,520 mm (4 ft 11 27/32 in) / 1,435 mm (4 ft 8 1/2 in))
- Slovakia (break-of-gauge: 1,520 mm (4 ft 11 27/32 in) / 1,435 mm (4 ft 8 1/2 in))
- Poland (break-of-gauge: 1,520 mm (4 ft 11 27/32 in) / 1,435 mm (4 ft 8 1/2 in) plus a standard gauge cross-border cargo line)

=== Metro ===
In Ukraine, there are 3 metro systems: the Kyiv Metro, the Kharkiv Metro, and the Dnipro Metro, as well as the Kryvyi Rih Metrotram, a partially underground light rail that is commonly referred to as a metro.

== Roads ==
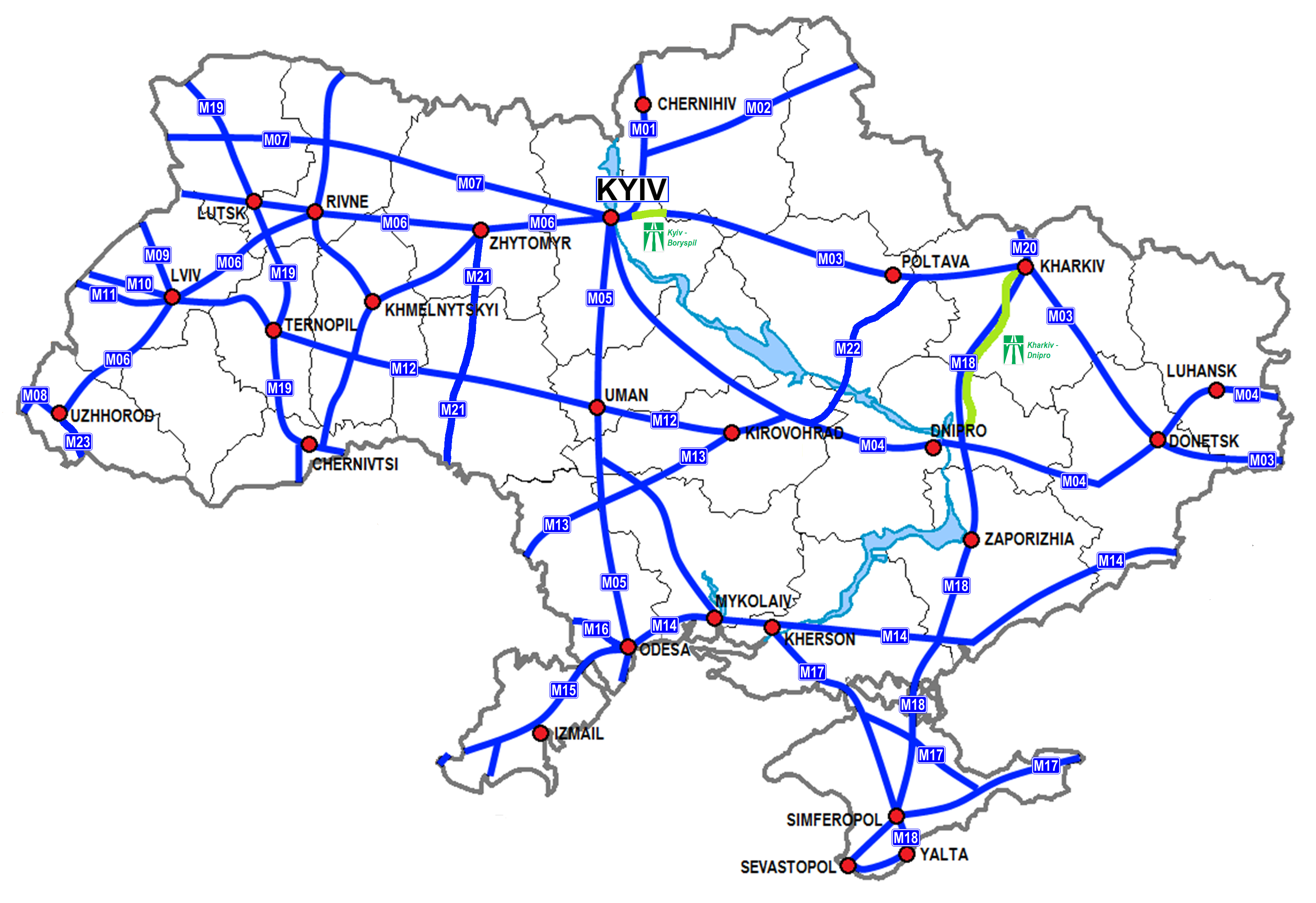
Road network in Ukraine

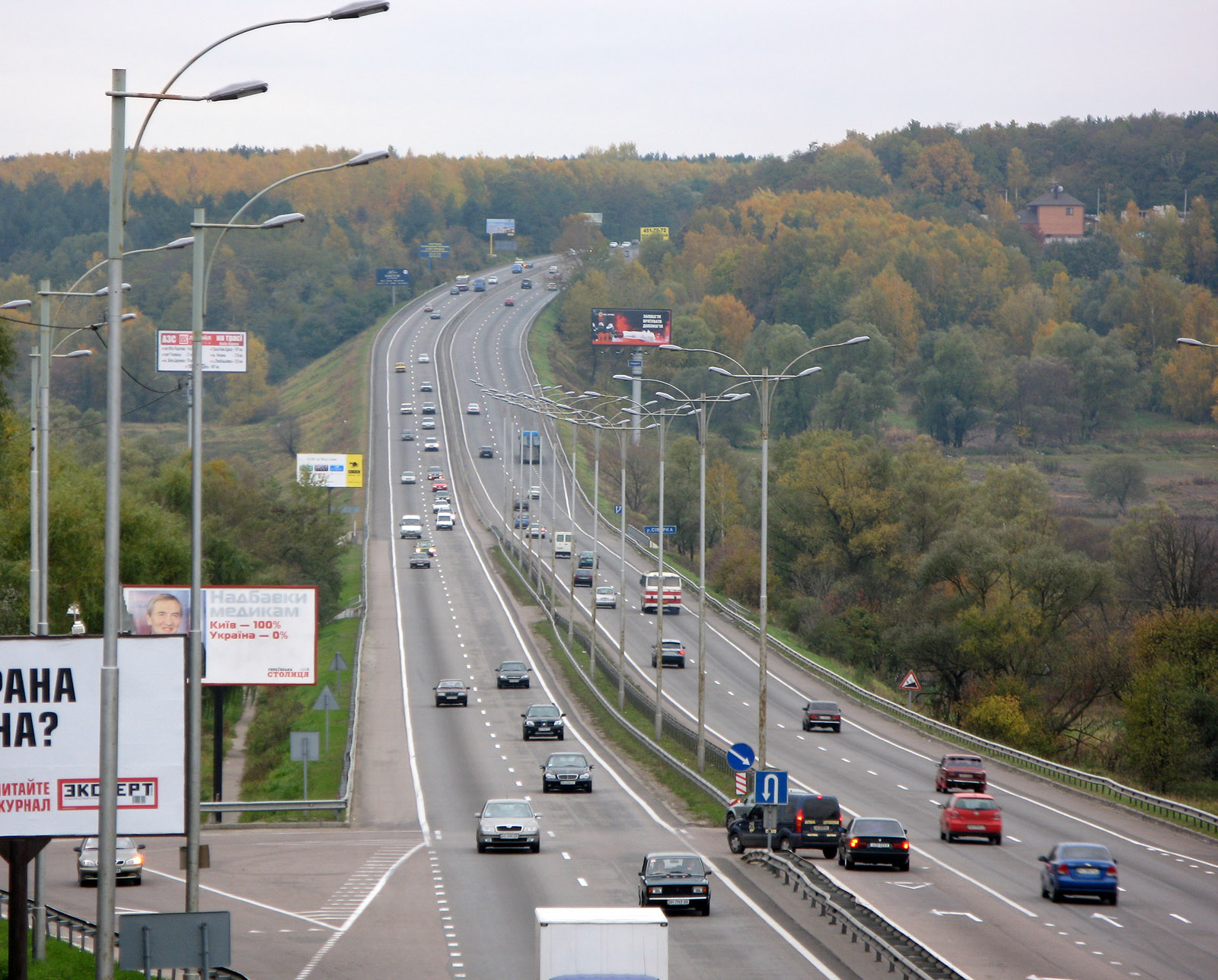
Section of the E95 / M05 highway near Kyiv.

The development of public roads in Ukraine is currently lagging behind the pace of motorisation in the country. During 1990-2010 the length of the highways network hardly increased at all. The density of highways in Ukraine is 6.6 times lower than in France (respectively 0.28 and 1.84 kilometres of roads per square kilometre area of the country). The length of express roads in Ukraine is 0.28 thousand km (in Germany – 12.5 thousand kilometres in France – 7.1 thousand kilometres), and the level of funding for each kilometre of road in Ukraine is around 5.5 – 6 times less than in those locations.

This is due to a number of objective reasons, including that the burden of maintaining the transport network per capita is significantly higher than in European countries because of Ukraine's relatively low population density (76 people per square kilometre), low purchasing power of citizens (1/5 of the Eurozone's purchasing capacity), relatively low car ownership and the nation's large territory.

The operational condition of roads is very poor; around 51.1% of roads do not meet minimum standards, and 39.2% require major rebuilds. The average speed on roads in Ukraine 2–3 times lower than in Western countries. As of 2016, many of Ukraine's major provincial highways are in very poor condition, with an Ukravtodor official stating that 97% of roads are in need of repair. The road repair budget was set at about ₴20 billion, but corruption causes the budget to be poorly spent and overweight trucks are common place rapidly causing more road damage.

- Total: 169,477 km
- Paved: 164,732 km (102,360 mi) (including 15 km (9 mi) of expressways); note – these roads, classified as "hard-surfaced", include both hard-paved highways and some all-weather gravel-surfaced roads.
- Unpaved: 4,745 km (2,948 mi) (2004)

=== Principal roads ===

Motorways in Ukraine, 193 km (120 mi) (2010):

Kyiv – Boryspil | Kharkiv – Dnipro

State Highways, 8,080 km (5,020 mi) (2009):

M01 | M02 | M03 | M04 | M05 | M06 | M07 | M08 | M09 | M10 | M11 | M12 | M13 | M14 | M15 | M16 | M17 | M18 | M19 | M20 | M21 | M22 | M23

Note: State highways are important national routes and are not necessarily high-speed roads

=== Bus ===
- Autolux Bus

== Aviation ==
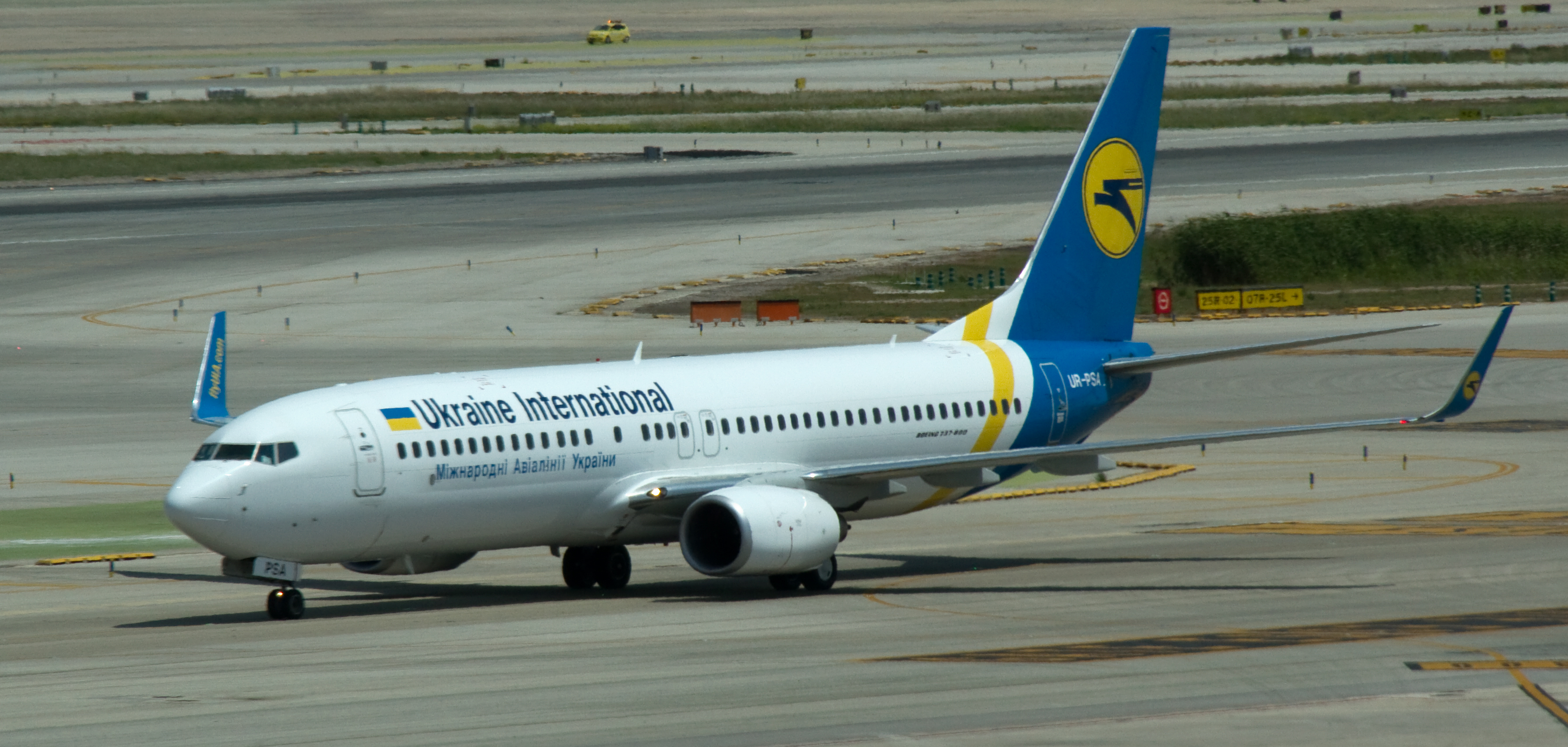
A Boeing 737 of UIA, one of Ukraine's flag carriers, taxiing at Barcelona (El Prat) Airport

=== Outlook ===
Ukraine's civil aviation sector has been suspended since February 2022 due to the ongoing conflict. All commercial flights remain grounded, and major airports including Boryspil International Airport, Kharkiv International Airport, and Lviv International Airport are closed to civilian traffic. Discussions about potential limited reopening of western airports (e.g., Lviv) have occurred, but no timeline for resumption of commercial services has been confirmed as of March 2026.

Prior to the invasion, Ukraine had established visa-free travel for EU nationals and invested in airport infrastructure for UEFA Euro 2012. Ukraine's flag carrier, Ukraine International Airlines, and cargo operator Antonov Airlines remain operational for non-Ukrainian routes where feasible.

=== Airports ===
- Total: 412 (2012)

==== Airports with paved runways ====
- Total: 179
- Over 3,047 m: 13
- 2,438 to 3,047 m: 49
- 1,524 to 2,437 m: 22
- 914 to 1,523 m: 6
- Under 914 m: 89 (2012)

Major airports are: Kyiv Boryspil Airport, Dnipro International Airport, Kharkiv Airport, Lviv Airport, Donetsk Airport (destroyed), Odesa Airport, and Simferopol Airport (occupied).

==== Airports with unpaved runways ====
- Total: 233
- 2,438 to 3,047 m: 2
- 1,524 to 2,437 m: 6
- 914 to 1,523 m: 9
- Under 914 m: 216 (2012)

=== Heliports ===
- Total: 7 (2012)

== Water transport ==
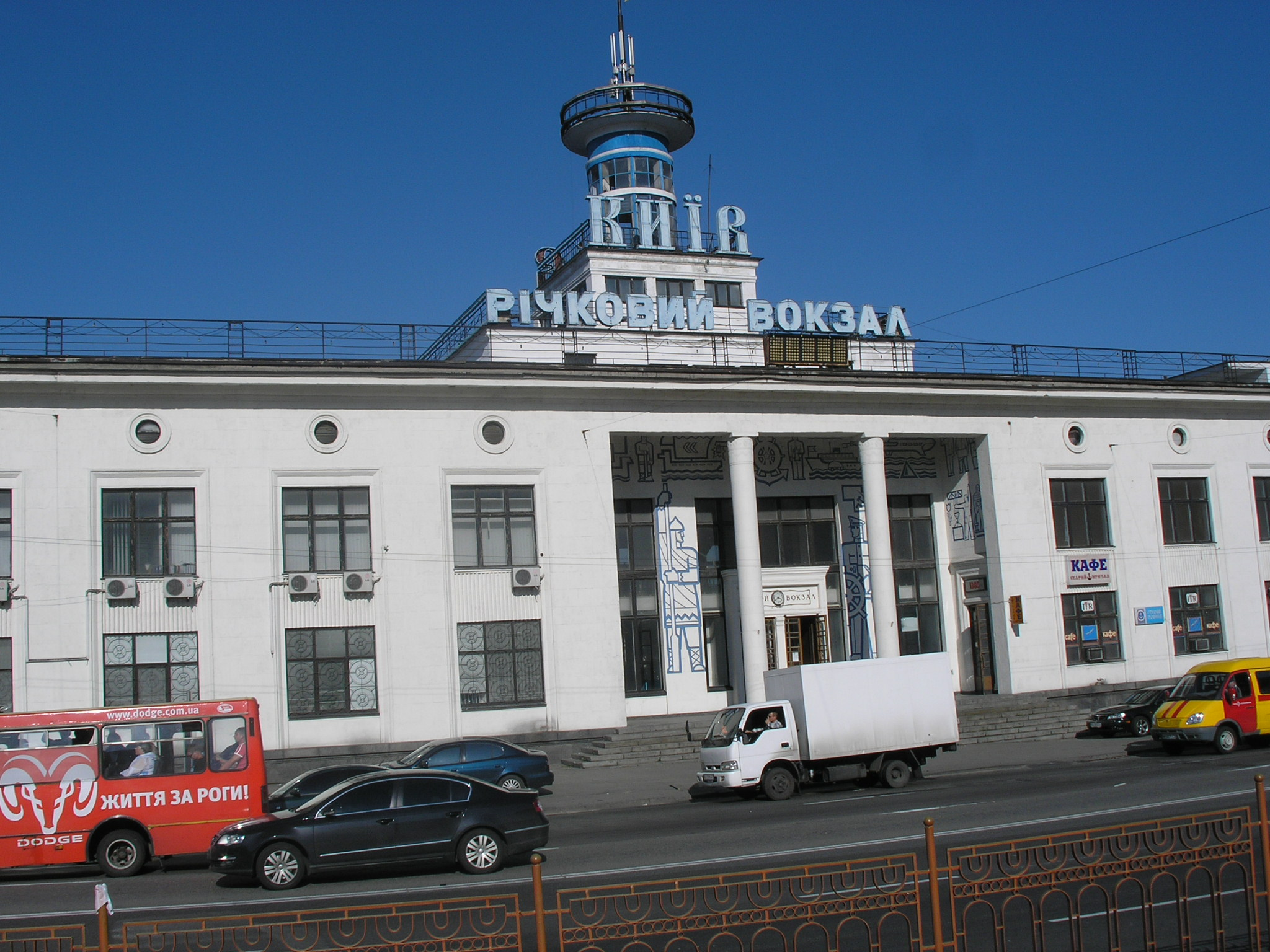
Passenger terminal of the Kyiv River Port.

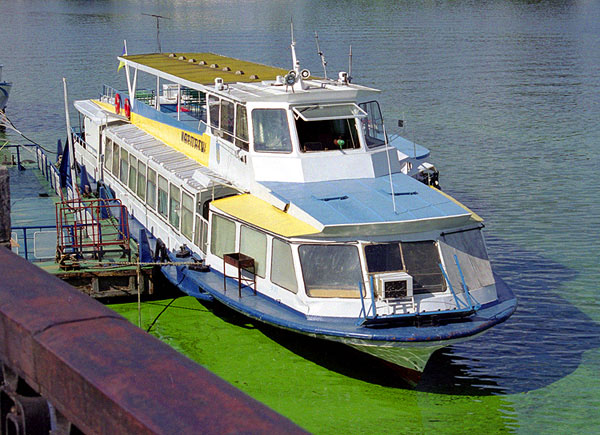
Leisure riverboat in Kyiv.

=== River transport ===
1,672 km (1,039 mi) navigable waterways on 7 rivers, most of them are on Danube, Dnieper and Pripyat rivers. All Ukraine's rivers freeze over in winter (usually December through March), limiting navigation. However, river icebreakers are available on the Dnieper, at least in vicinity of Kyiv.

==== Danube ====
The most important waterway of Ukraine.

- Izmail
- Reni Commercial Seaport
- Ust-Danube Commercial Seaport

==== Dnipro ====
Dnipro within Ukraine is a regulated system of reservoirs separated by dams with shiplocks. The river is navigable through all its Ukrainian length.

- Cherkasy
- Dnipro
- Kakhovka
- Kremenchuk
- Kyiv River Terminal
- Nikopol
- Zaporizhzhia

==== Pripyat ====
Notable riverport Chernobyl is now abandoned due to the Chernobyl disaster, but the waterway retains its importance as part of the Dnieper–Baltic Sea route.

==== Southern Bug ====
Plans are announced to revitalize commercial freight navigation on the Southern Bug as part of the increasing grain export from Ukraine.

=== Sea transport ===
==== Merchant marine ====
- Total: 134 ships (1,000 gross tonnage (GT) or over) totaling 862,690 GT/963,550 tonnes deadweight (DWT)
- Ships by type: bulk carrier 3, cargo ship 98, chemical tanker 1, passenger ship 6, passenger/cargo ship 5, petroleum tanker 8, refrigerated cargo ship 11, specialized tanker 2 (2010)

==== Sea ports and harbours ====
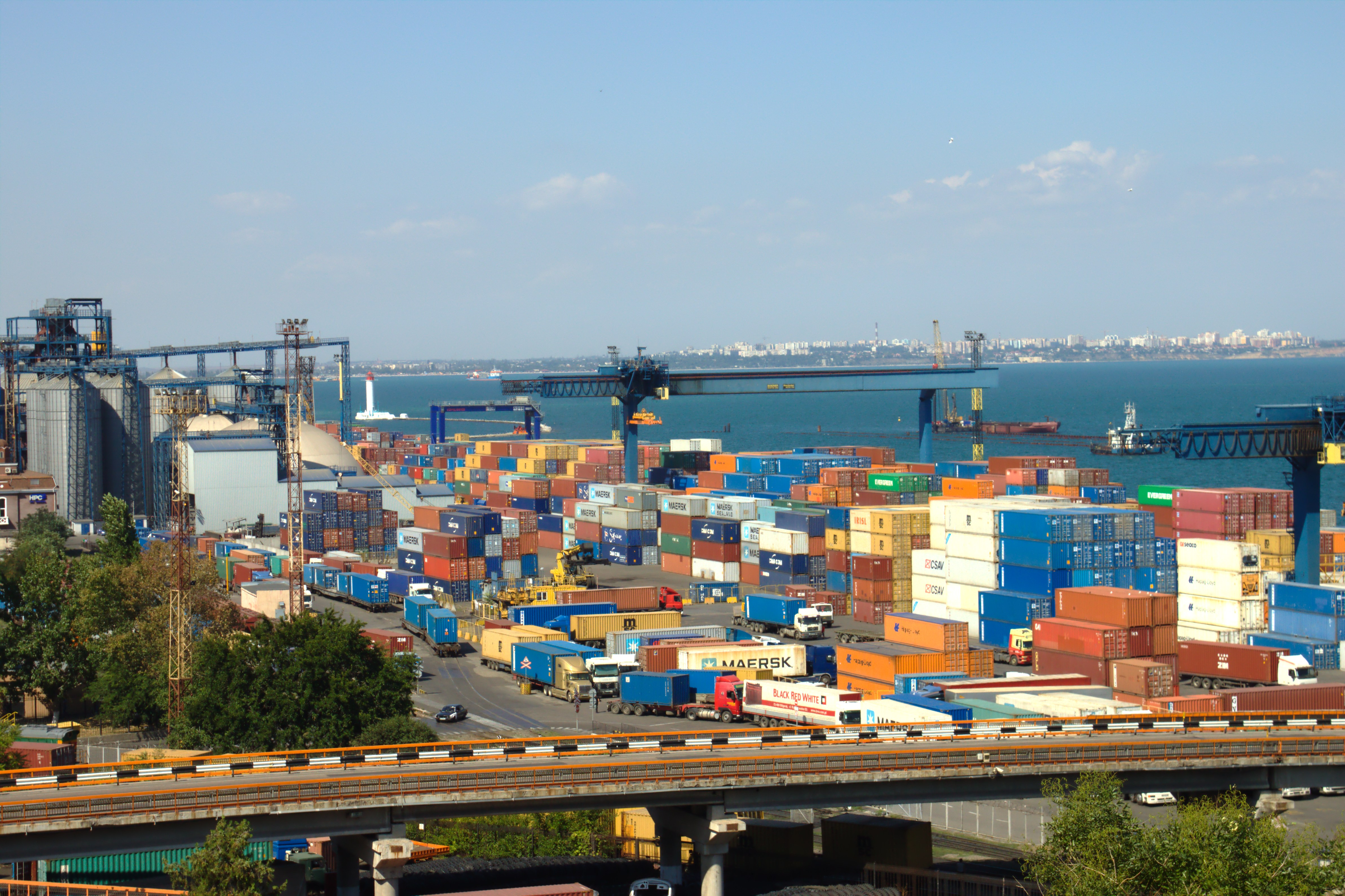
Port of Odesa on the Black Sea is the largest seaport in Ukraine.

As of July 2013, Ukraine had 18 "marine trade ports" available for foreign ships' entry. Some of these "marine trade ports" are actually port conglomerates comprising several non-adjacent ports and tenant private terminals. Major river ports are also considered "marine" international ports.

- Berdiansk (Sea of Azov) – operations suspended due to conflict
  - Agro-CLASS (oil terminal)
- Bilhorod-Dnistrovsky Seaport (Black Sea)
  - Port Buhaz (auxiliary)
- Theodosia (Black Sea) – occupied
- Chornomorsk (Black Sea) (Ukrferry: Odesa — Istanbul / Derince / Haifa / Varna)
  - Aldi (specialized complex)
  - Chornomorsk Fuel Terminal
  - Chem-Oil-Transit-Ukraine
  - Trans Bulk Terminal (grain complex)
  - Ship Maintenance Factory
  - Fishing port
- Izmail (Danube river / Black Sea) – critical alternative port since 2022
  - Triton Services Agency Ukraine (oil pier)
  - Portoflot (specialized terminal)
- Kerch (Black Sea) – occupied
  - Zaliv Shipbuilding yard
  - Port Krym (ferry: Kerch — Port Kavkaz (Russia))
  - Fishing port
  - Oil terminal of fishing port
  - TES-Terminal
  - Port Kamysh-Burun (Azov Sea)
- Kherson (Dnipro river / Black Sea) – occupied
  - Kherson Shipyard
  - All-Ukrainian Industrial Union
  - Palada
- Mariupol (Sea of Azov) – occupied, port infrastructure heavily damaged
  - Metallurgy Complex Azovstal
  - Ship Maintenance Factory
  - Freight terminal of ship maintenance factory
- Mykolaiv (Southern Bug river / Black Sea)
  - Freight terminal of Nika-Terra
  - Freight terminal of Okean
  - Freight terminal of Black Sea Shipyard
  - Freight terminal of Mykolaiv Alumina Factory
  - Freight terminal of Nibulon
  - Freight terminal of Greentour-ex
  - Port of Mykolaiv Grain Elevator (grain terminal)
  - Port Ochakiv
  - Dnipro-Buh Sea Terminal
- Olvia (in Mykolaiv, Southern Bug river / Black Sea), a "specialized" weapons-transiting port
- Port of Odesa (Black Sea) – primary hub for Ukrainian Maritime Export Corridor
- Reni (Danube river / Black Sea) – critical alternative port since 2022
- Port of Sevastopol (Black Sea) – occupied
  - Port Balaklava (auxiliary)
- Skadovsk (Black Sea)
  - Port Khorly (auxiliary)
  - Port Henichesk (auxiliary)
- Ust-Dunaisk (Vylkove) (Danube river / Black Sea)
  - Port of Kiliya
- Yalta (Black Sea) – occupied
- Pivdenne (Black Sea)
  - Trans invest service
  - Trans invest service (containers)
  - Sea Side (Ukraine)
  - UkrTransNafta (oil terminal)
  - Borivage (grain terminal)
  - Transbunker-Yuzhny
- Yevpatoria (Black Sea) – occupied

==== Other notable seaports ====
- Donuzlav (Black Sea) – occupied
- Chornomorske (Black Sea) – Ukraine's offshore drilling base port

==== Important supporting agencies ====
- Delta Lotsman, the maritime pilot company serving the territorial waters of Ukraine
- "Derzhhidrohrafiya" (State Hydro Geography), a scientific-production complex of hydro-geographical state companies and science-research center "Ukrmorkartohrafiya" (all lighthouses located in Ukraine belong to the institution) The Black Sea Fleet of the Russian Federation refuses to surrender former Soviet navigational facilities since 1997
- Maritime Security Agency in correspondence of the SOLAS International Convention (including its amendment the ISPS Code)
- Shipping registry of Ukraine
- Port registry of Ukraine

==== Shipping companies ====
- UkrFerry
- Ukrrichflot
- Ukrainian Danube Shipping, freight and passenger transportation company (primarily Danube river delta)
- Black Sea Shipping Company, freight and passenger transportation company

==== Ship building and maintenance companies ====
- Ship building and maintenance companies of Ukraine

== Pipelines ==
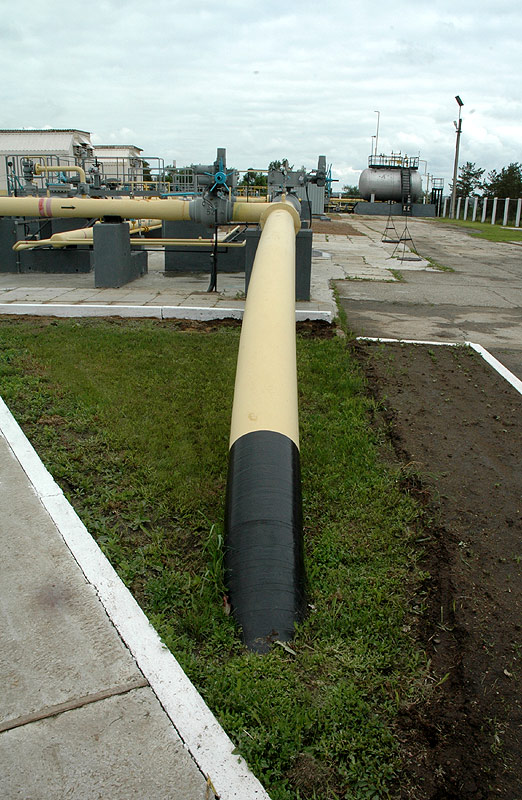
The world's longest ammonia pipeline, running from the TogliattiAzot plant in Russia to Odesa in Ukraine.

- natural gas 36,493 km (22,676 mi) (2010)
- crude oil 4,514 km (2,805 mi) (2010)
- petroleum products 4,211 km (2,617 mi) (2010)
- ammonia

The natural gas transport-system can take in a maximum of 288 billion cubic meters of natural gas per year. Its annual output capacity is 178.5 billion cubic meters, including 142.2 billion to be forwarded to European countries. Since 2022, gas transit volumes have declined significantly due to the suspension of Russian gas flows through Ukraine and ongoing conflict-related infrastructure risks.

== See also ==
- List of the busiest airports in Ukraine
- Transport in Kyiv
- Reconstruction of Ukraine
- Ukraine–Bosnia and Herzegovina transport visa-free regime
