= Economic operator =

An economic operator is a business or other organisation which supplies goods, works or services within the context of market operations. The term is used in public procurement to cover suppliers, contractors and service providers.

The term is defined in the UK's Public Contracts Regulations as:

"any person or public entity or group of such persons and entities, including any temporary association of undertakings, which offers the execution of works or a work, the supply of products or the provision of services on the market".

Early European Union legislation on public procurement was contained within three separate Directives on purchasing of services, goods and works, but once a single directive was adopted in 2004, a term was needed which would cover suppliers, contractors and service providers without implying or being limited to private sector operations. The terms 'business' or 'undertaking' would therefore have been inappropriate and the term 'economic operator' was therefore adopted. In introducing the new term within the 2004 Directive, the text explained that the terms "contractor", "supplier" and "service provider" (as used within the Directive) would mean 'any natural or legal person or public entity or group of such persons and/or bodies which offers on the market, respectively, the execution of works and/or a work, products or services' and the term "economic operator" shall cover equally the concepts of contractor, supplier and service provider. It is used merely in the interest of simplification.

In public procurement we can define 5 subsets of economic operators, based on their abilities, information and their choices:

- $E\subseteq\Nu$: EOs who can fulfill the need of the contracting authority
- $\Iota\subseteq\Epsilon$ : EOs who were informed about the notice
- $\Tau\subseteq\Iota$ : EOs who finally became tenderers
- $\Iota'=\Epsilon-\Iota$ : EOs who could not reach the information of the publication of the notice
- $\Tau'=\Iota-\Tau$ : EOs who had access to the information but did not submit a tender
