= UkrFerry =

Ukrainian sea transport company

Судноплавна компанія UkrFerry
- Company type: Private
- Industry: Sea transport
- Founded: 1995
- Headquarters: Odesa, Ukraine
- Key people: Oleksandr Kurlyand (President)
- Products: Ferries, port services, passenger transportation, freight transportation, holidays, business travel
- Revenue: ₴1.899 million (2011)
- Number of employees: 300
- Website: www.ukrferry.com

UkrFerry Shipping Company (Ukrainian: СК Укрферрі) is a ferry operator at the Black Sea, with ferry services serving Ukraine, Bulgaria, Turkey, and Georgia. The company's fleet consists of four ship type RORO and ROPAX generally with 34,000 DWT.

== Routes ==
- Chornomorsk - Batumi: Greifswald
- Kerch - Poti: Heroes of Shipka, Heroes of Pleven, Heroes of Odesa, Heroes of Sevastopol
- Chornomorsk - Derince: Heroes of Shipka, Heroes of Pleven
- Chornomorsk - Varna: Heroes of Shipka, Heroes of Pleven, Heroes of Odesa, Heroes of Sevastopol
- Varna - Batumi: Heroes of Shipka, Heroes of Pleven, Heroes of Odesa, Heroes of Sevastopol
- Odesa - Istanbul: Caledonia (route suspended since 2010)
- Chornomorsk - Haydarpaşa

== Service suspension and resumption ==
Ferry services between Chornomorsk and Batumi were suspended in 2022 following the onset of the Russian invasion of Ukraine. In June 2024, UkrFerry announced the resumption of this route, with the first departure from Chornomorsk scheduled for 9 July and arrival in Batumi on 12 July.

The route avoids the Crimean Peninsula, which has been under Russian occupation since 2014, and operates through a corridor in the western Black Sea. This corridor was established following the withdrawal of Russian naval forces from the area in 2023.

== Fleet ==
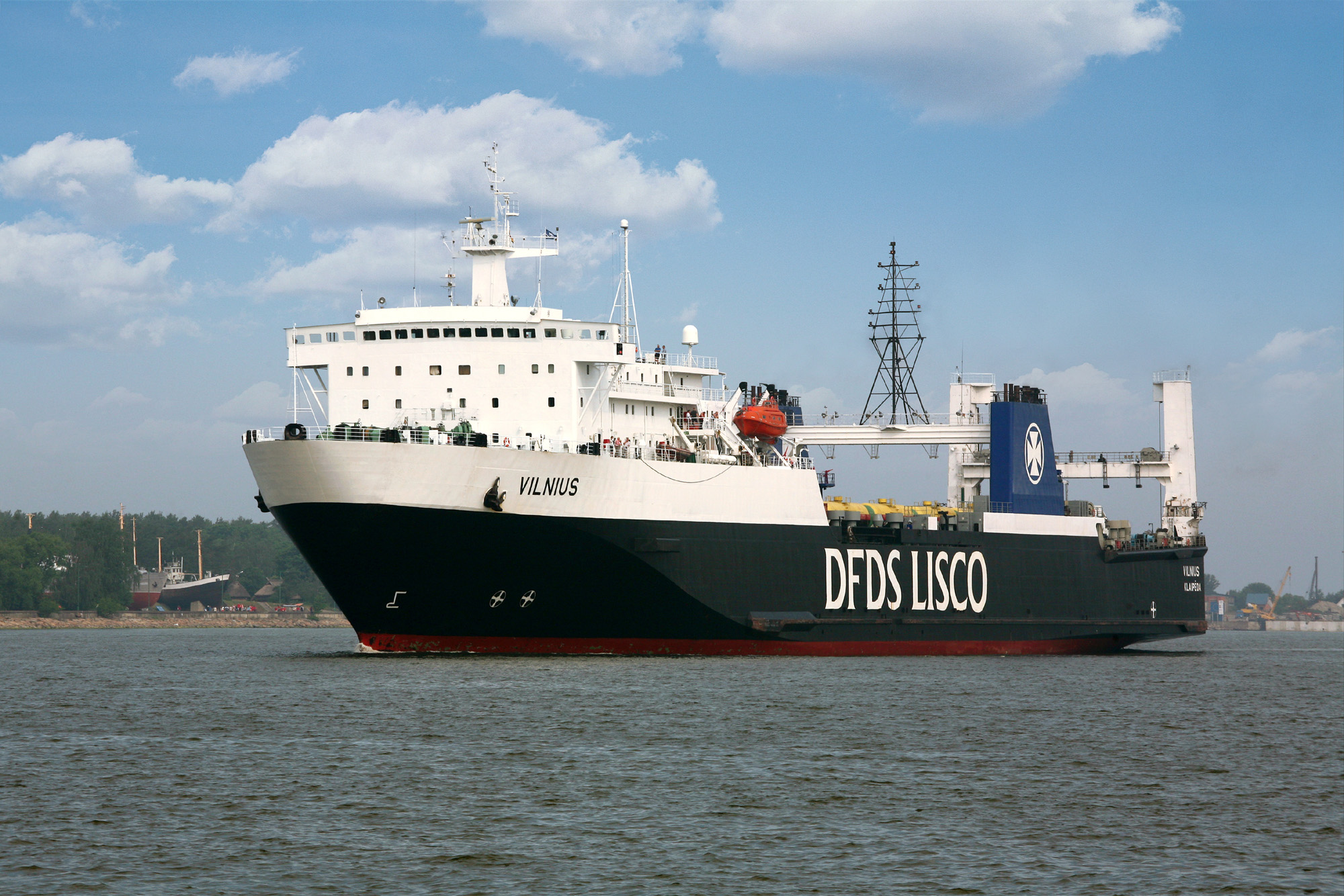
Vilnius Seaways

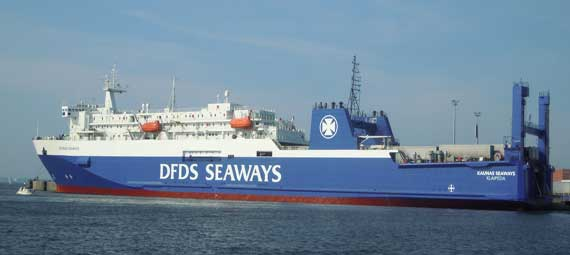
Kaunas Seaways

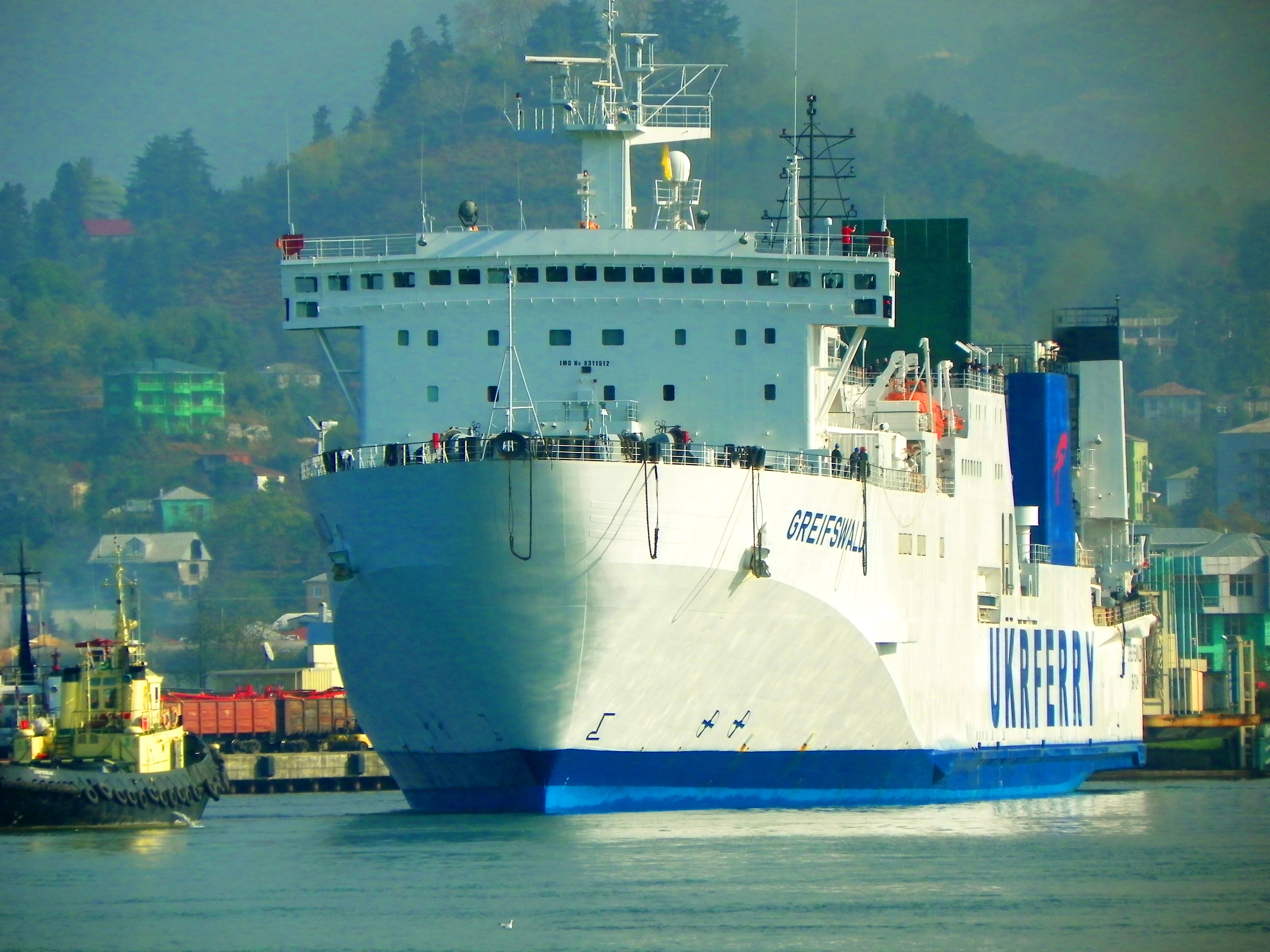
Ukrferri Greifswald in Batumi

=== Current ships ===
Two out of three ships are owned by the Danish DFDS. All ships built at the Mathias-Thesen Werft in Wismar as EGF-321 class ferries.

Name	Built	Tonnage	Passengers	Notes
(Denmark) Vilnius Seaways	1987, East Germany	22,341	132	The world's largest car-rail passenger ferry according to the Guinness World Records.
(Denmark) Kaunas Seaways	1989, East Germany	25,606	250	
(Ukraine) Greifswald	1988, East Germany	24,084	150	
