= List of ports in Georgia (country) =

Georgia is a country in the Caucasus, with an access to the Black Sea. There are four functioning seaports—Batumi, Poti, Kulevi, and Supsa—in Georgia and one, that of Anaklia, is under construction. Four more ports—Sukhumi, Gudauta, Gagra, and Ochamchire—are located in occupied Abkhazia and their operation is officially suspended by Georgia.

Image	Port	Municipality and Region	Coordinates	Cargo tonnage 2015	Container volume 2015 (TEUs)	Annual container terminal capacity (TEUs)	Annual passenger terminal capacity	Comment
	Batumi Sea Port	Batumi, Adjara	41°38′59.6″N 41°39′25.5″E	5.7 million	54,695	100,000	180,000	In February 2008, the Batumi Industrial Holding, a subsidiary of the Kazakhstan state-owned KazTransOil acquired management rights of the Batumi Sea Port and purchased 100% shares of the Batumi Oil Terminal for 49 years. The company is mainly concentrated on liquid cargo but also handles dry bulk cargo and containers.
	Poti Sea Port	Poti, Samegrelo-Zemo Svaneti	42°09′33.2″N 41°39′30.9″E	6.8 million	325,121	400,000	n/a	In 2008, 51% of shares of the Poti Sea Port and its management rights for 49 years were purchased by the United Arab Emirates-based RAKIA, which then obtained the remaining share. In April 2011, RAKIA sold 80% of its share to APM Terminals, a subsidiary of the Danish giant Maersk and withdrew from the port management. The business is currently focused mainly on dry bulk and containers.
	Kulevi Port/Black Sea Oil Terminal	Khobi Municipality, Samegrelo–Zemo Svaneti	42°16′3″N 41°38′19″E	2.5 million	n/a	n/a	n/a	Kulevi port and terminal, which mainly deal with liquid cargo, were purchased by the Azerbaijani state-owned SOCAR in January 2007.
	Supsa Sea Terminal	Lanchkhuti Municipality, Guria	42°01′32.9″N 41°45′59.6″E	4.2 million	n/a	n/a	n/a	The Supsa Sea Terminal, the final point of the Baku–Supsa Pipeline, was opened on 17 April 1999. It is operated by the United Kingdom-based BP.
	Anaklia Deep Sea Port	Zugdidi Municipality, Samegrelo–Zemo Svaneti	42°23′12.1″N 41°34′23.6″E	n/a	n/a	n/a	n/a	The construction of the Anaklia Deep Sea Port was launched in December 2017, however, the construction was halted. New contract was awarded to Chinese consortium, Georgia will hold 51% of the ownership stake and 49% will be held by consortium. Phase 1 is set to complete in 2029 and it will be able to handle up to 600 000 containers (TEUs) per year
