= Batumi Seaport =

Port of Batumi
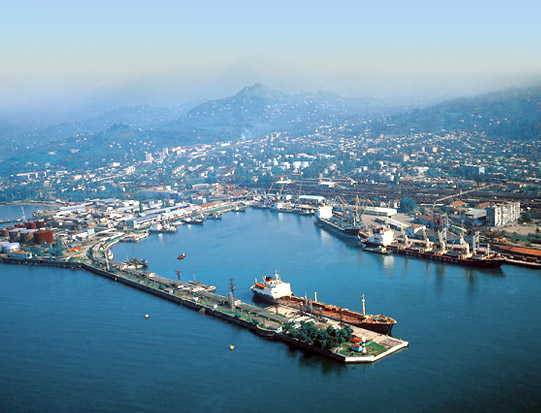
- Click on the map for a fullscreen view
- Native name: ბათუმის საზღვაო ნავსადგური

Location
- Country: Georgia
- Location: Batumi, Adjara
- Coordinates: 41.649°N 41.658°E
- UN/LOCODE: GEBUS

Details
- Owned by: KazTransOil
- No. of berths: 11

Statistics
- Annual cargo tonnage: 700,000 Tons (2013)
- Annual container volume: 100 000 TEU (2013)
- Passenger traffic: 180,000 (2013)
- Website; Batumi Sea Port

The Batumi Seaport (Georgian: ბათუმის საზღვაო პორტი, romanized: batumis sazghvao p'ort'i) is a Georgian seaport. It is the largest container, ferry and general cargo seaport in Georgia. Located in the city of Batumi, on the south-east coast of the Black Sea. The port is also used as a major transit port for oil refining in Kazakhstan and Azerbaijan. Batumi Port has the ability to meet customer requirements for various cargo, ships and passengers. The port has five terminals: oil terminal, dry cargo terminal, container terminal, railway-ferry crossing and passenger terminal. These terminals are equipped with appropriate cranes, which facilitates the timely and quality processing of cargo and meet the requirements of the port's customers.

== History ==
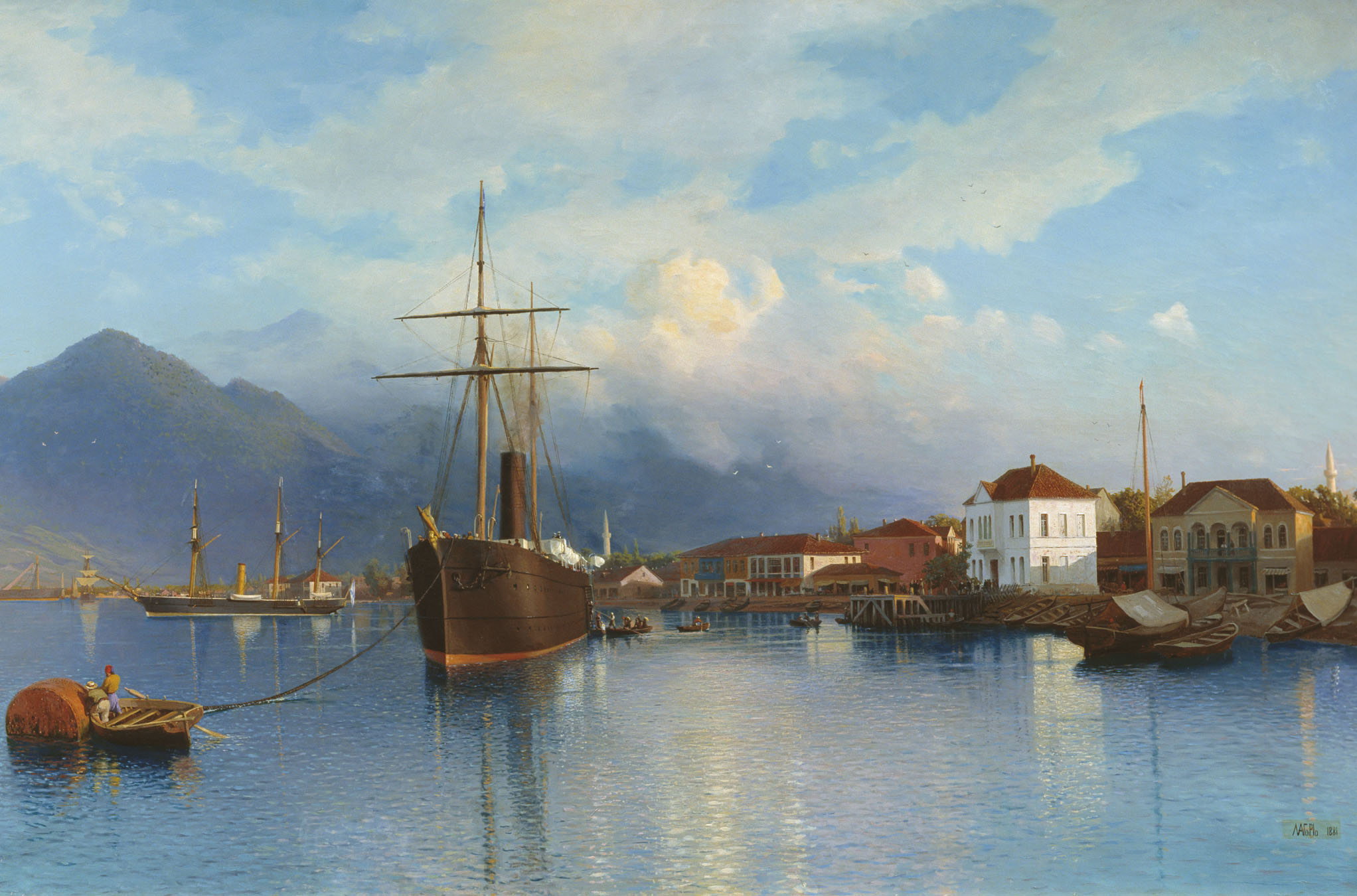
Port of Batumi in 1881

The history of the Batumi seaport dates back to the Roman Empire, when during the reign of Hadrian, the port of Batumi was one of the most important points of the Roman merchant network.

Batumi port was and still is distinguished by its geostrategic and natural advantages. In particular, The port is located in a natural deep-water, which allows large tonnage vessels. Also, It is not necessary to cross the canal to enter the port, which exempts the owner from paying the canal fee. In the formation of the current global economic network in the second half of the 19th century, the above advantages led to the fact that the port of Batumi received the status of "Porto-Franco" (freeport) from 1878 to 1885. The main factor in the development of the city of Batumi and the port was the oil transported by rail from Baku to Batumi. Along with oil refining, various demands also increased, which led to improvements in the city's infrastructure. This was revealed by the fact that the Baku-Batumi pipeline was built in 1900. It was one of the first oil pipelines in the world.

In his book, The Prize, Daniel Yergin, president of the Cambridge Energy Research Associates, notes that because of the port's geostrategic location and advantages, oil was first shipped from the Batumi port in August 1892 via the Murex tanker, which was also the first tanker. Suez Canal on 22 August of the same year.

The authors of this project were such prominent personalities as Nobel, Rothschild, Samuel (founder of the firm "Shell"), Mantashev and others. So, the port of Batumi has long been known as the most important part of the Eurasian and international transport corridor. Today, the port of Batumi is a connecting transport line that connects Europe with Asia and vice versa. The port is connected to the countries of the Caucasus, Central Asia, Russia and Turkey by road and rail.

== Gallery ==
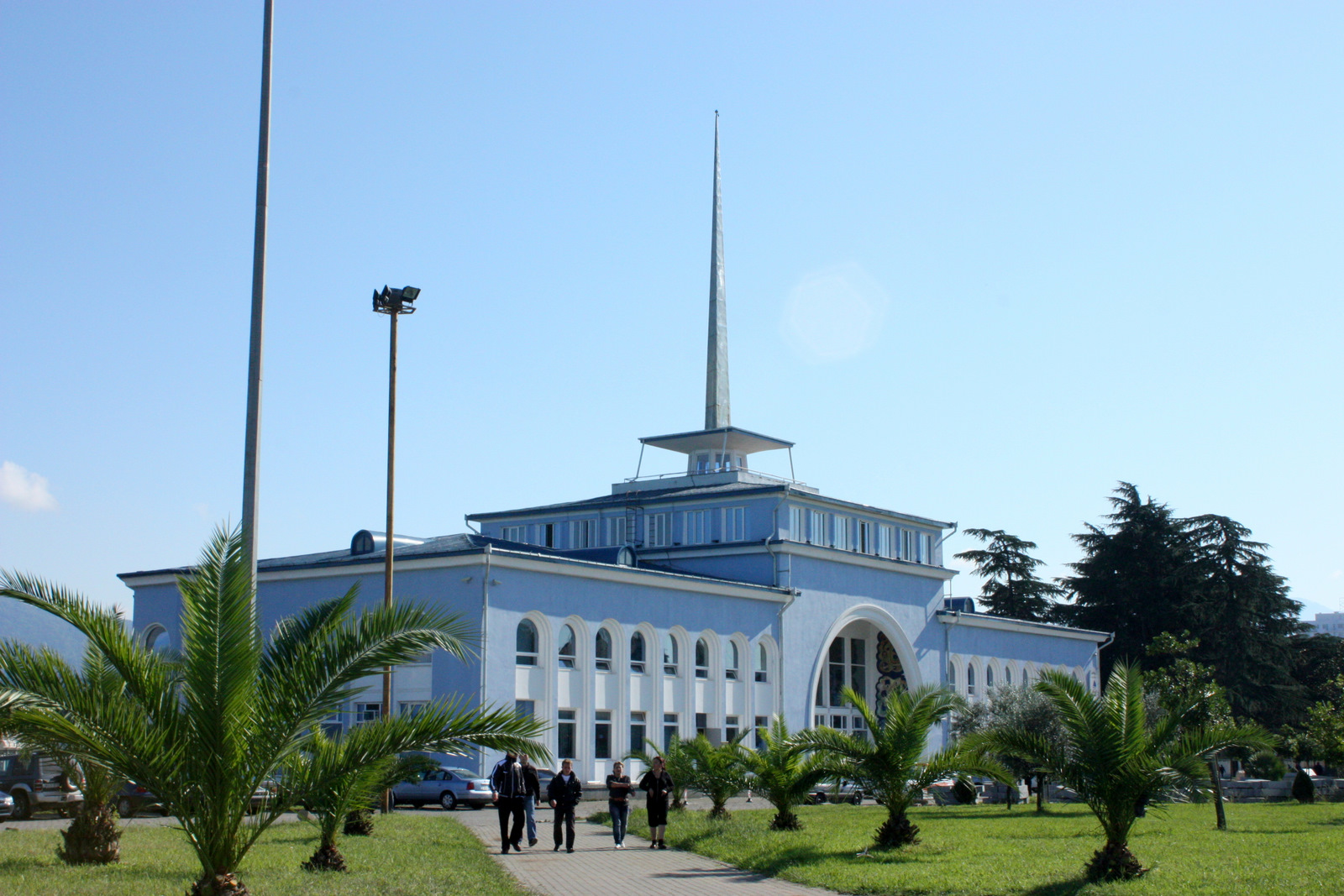

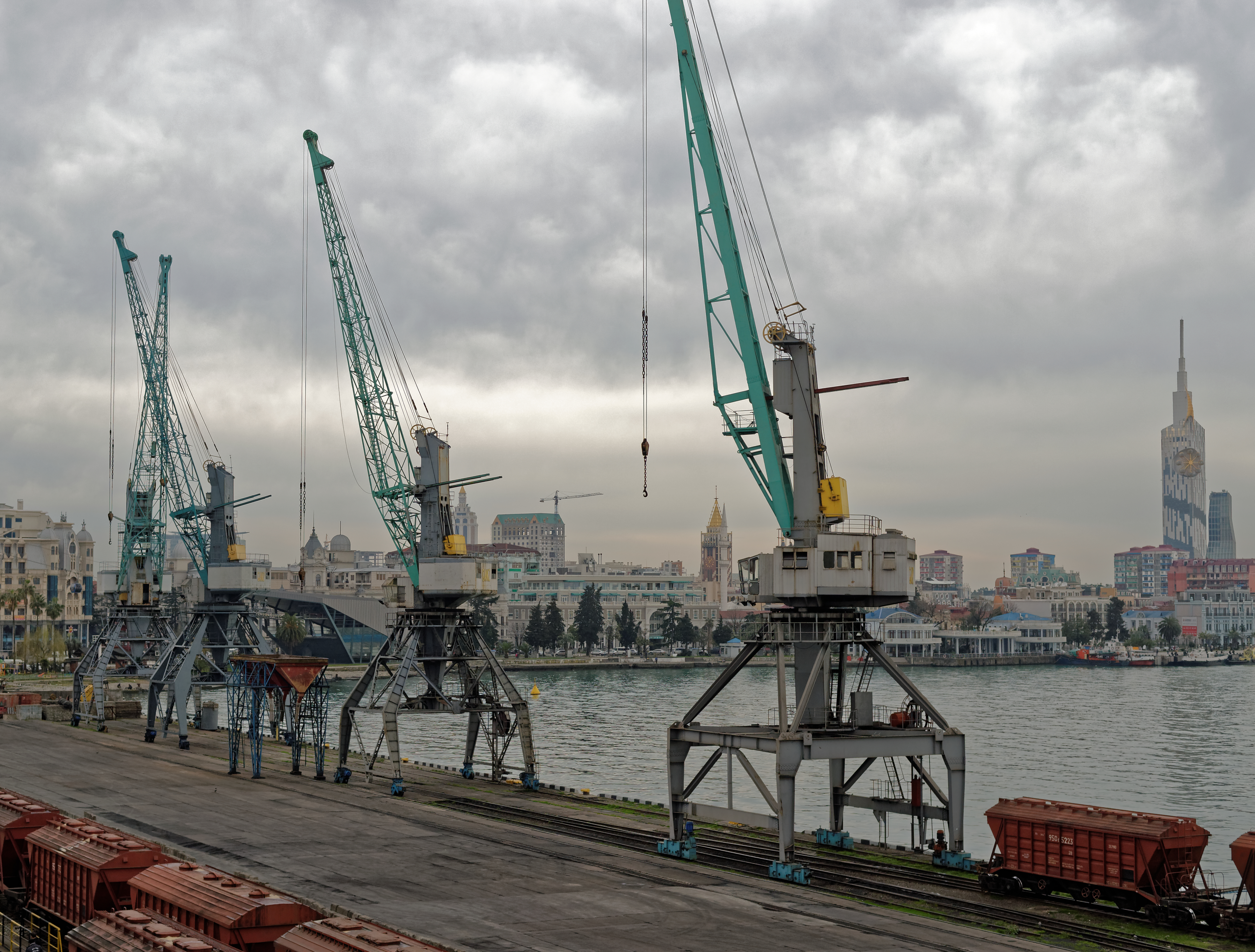

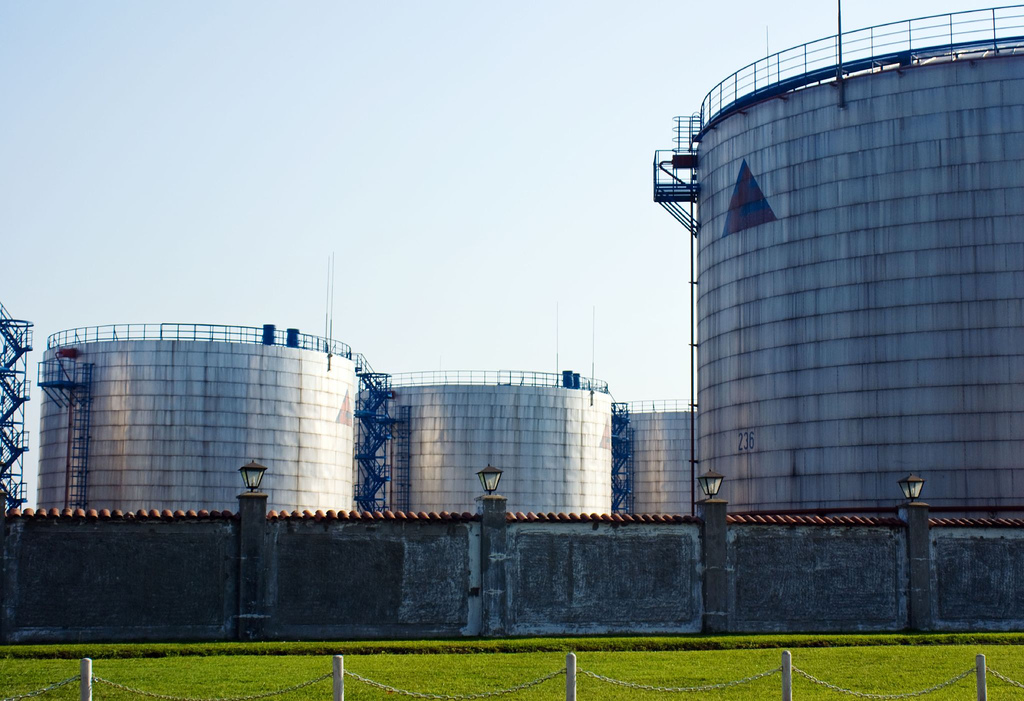

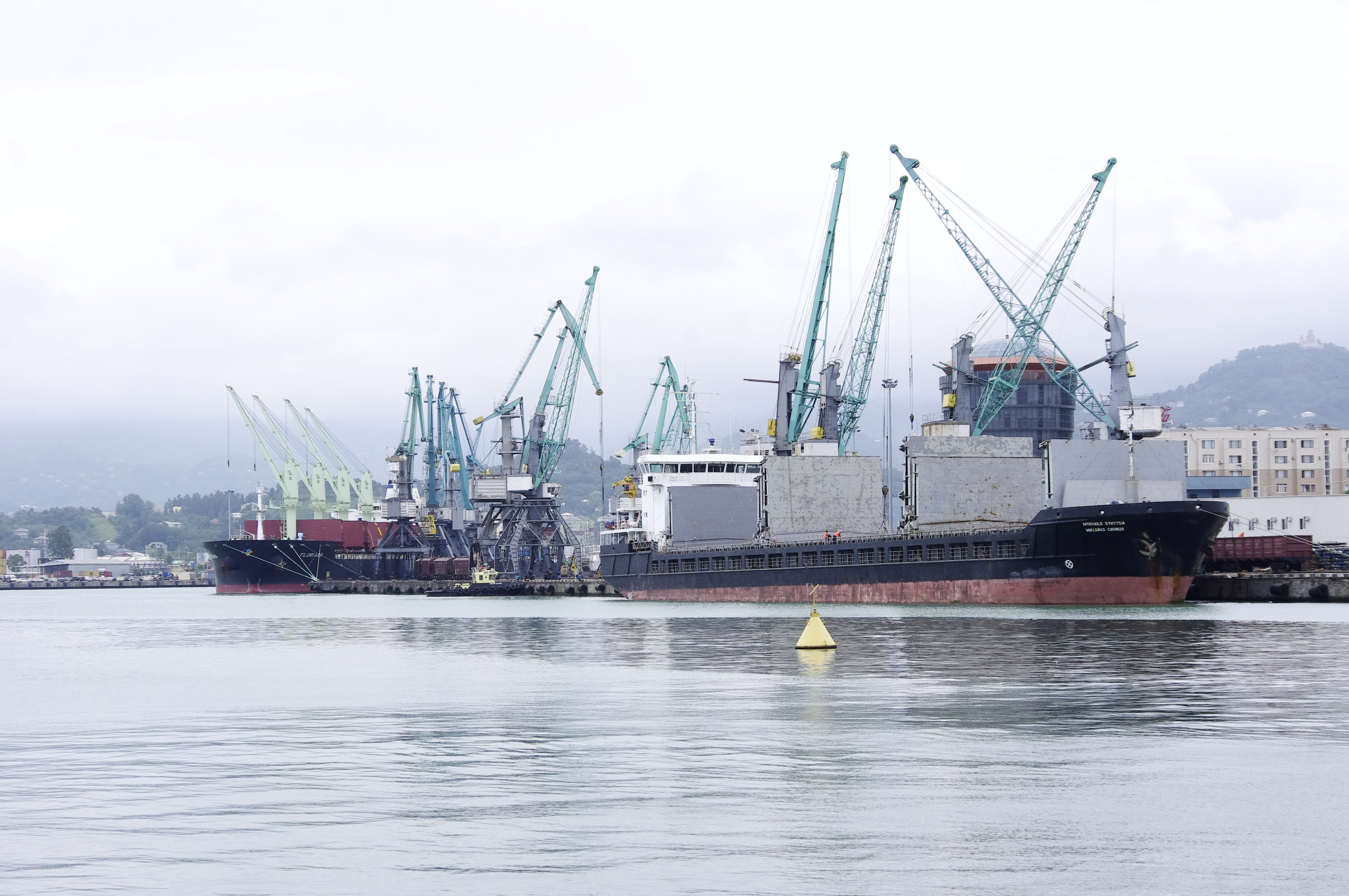

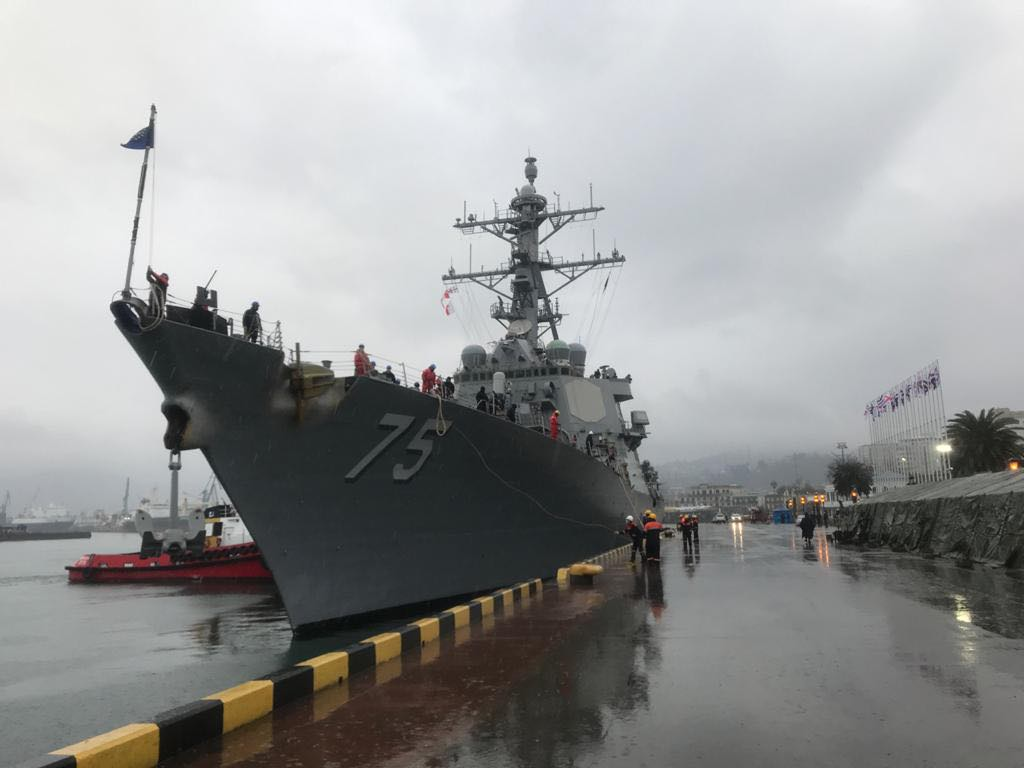

== See also ==
- List of ports in Georgia (country)
- Poti Sea Port
