= Oleksandrivka, Chornomorsk urban hromada, Odesa Raion, Odesa Oblast =

Rural locality in Odesa Oblast, Ukraine

Oleksandrivka Олександрівка
- Rural settlement
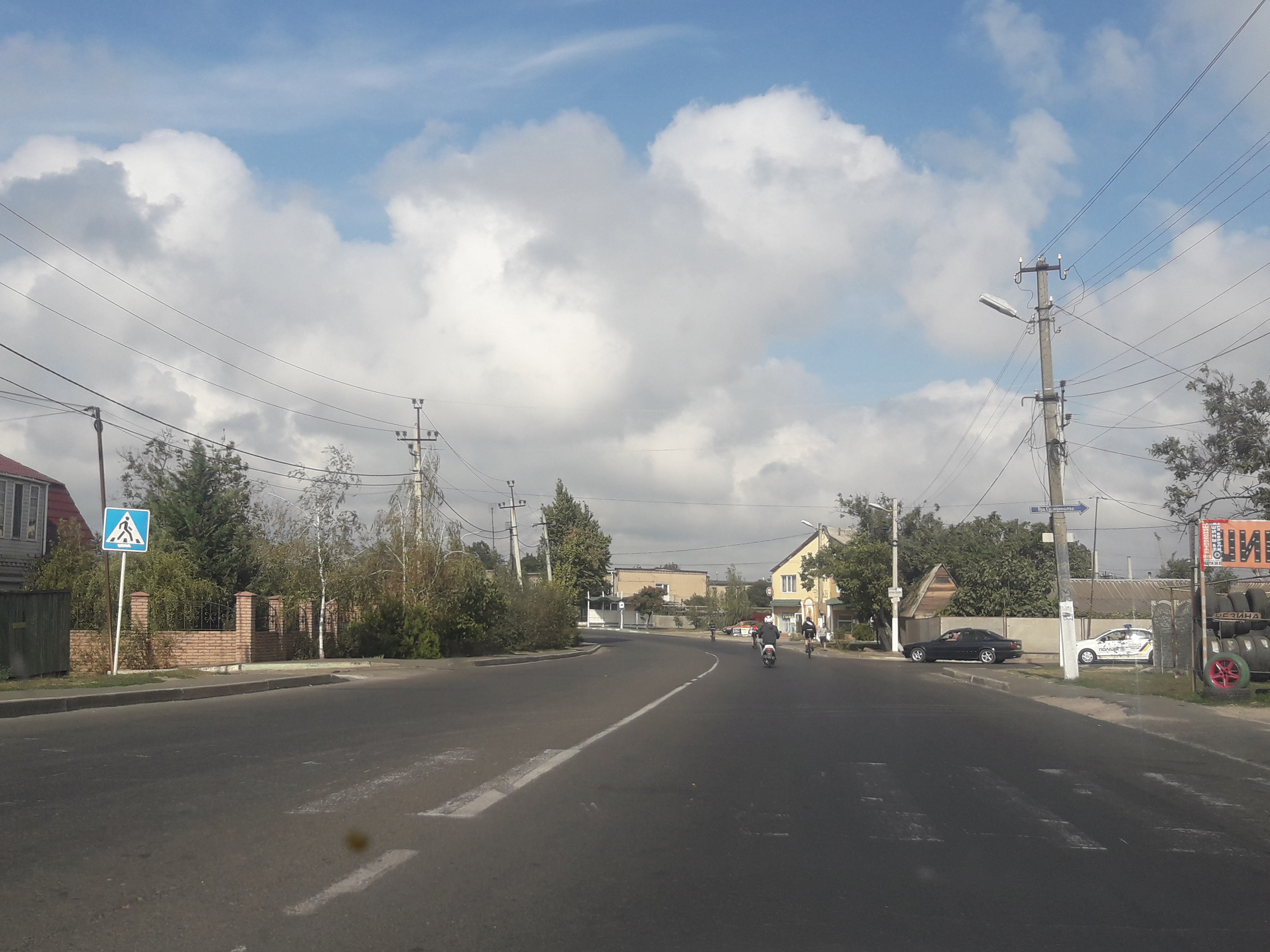

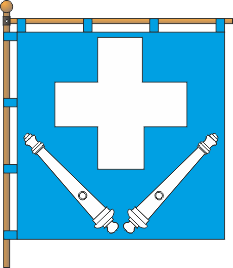
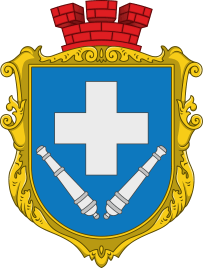
- Flag Coat of arms

- Location within Odesa Oblast Location within Ukraine
- Coordinates: 46°19′46″N 30°38′01″E
- Country: Ukraine
- Oblast: Odesa Oblast
- Raion: Odesa Raion
- Hromada: Chornomorsk urban hromada

Population (2022)
  - Total: 7,495
- Time zone: UTC+2 (EET)
  - Summer (DST): UTC+3 (EEST)

Oleksandrivka (Ukrainian: Олександрівка, Russian: Александровка) is a rural settlement in Odesa Raion of Odesa Oblast in Ukraine. It is located on the right bank of Sukhyi Estuary adjacent to the city of Chornomorsk. Oleksandrivka belongs to Chornomorsk urban hromada, one of the hromadas of Ukraine. Population: 7,495 (2022 estimate)

== History ==
Until 18 July 2020, Oleksandrivka belonged to Illichivsk Municipality. The municipality was abolished as an administrative unit in July 2020 as part of the administrative reform of Ukraine, which reduced the number of raions of Odesa Oblast to seven. The area of Illichivsk Municipality was merged into Odesa Raion.

Until 26 January 2024, Oleksandrivka was designated urban-type settlement. On this day, a new law entered into force which abolished this status, and Oleksandrivka became a rural settlement.

== Economy ==
=== Transportation ===
The closest railway stations, Post 25 km, and Post 22 km, are located in Velykodolynske immediately west of the settlement. They are all on the railway connecting Odesa and Bilhorod-Dnistrovskyi. There is infrequent passenger traffic.

Highway M27 connecting Odesa with Chornomorsk runs through the settlement.
