= Kulevi oil terminal =

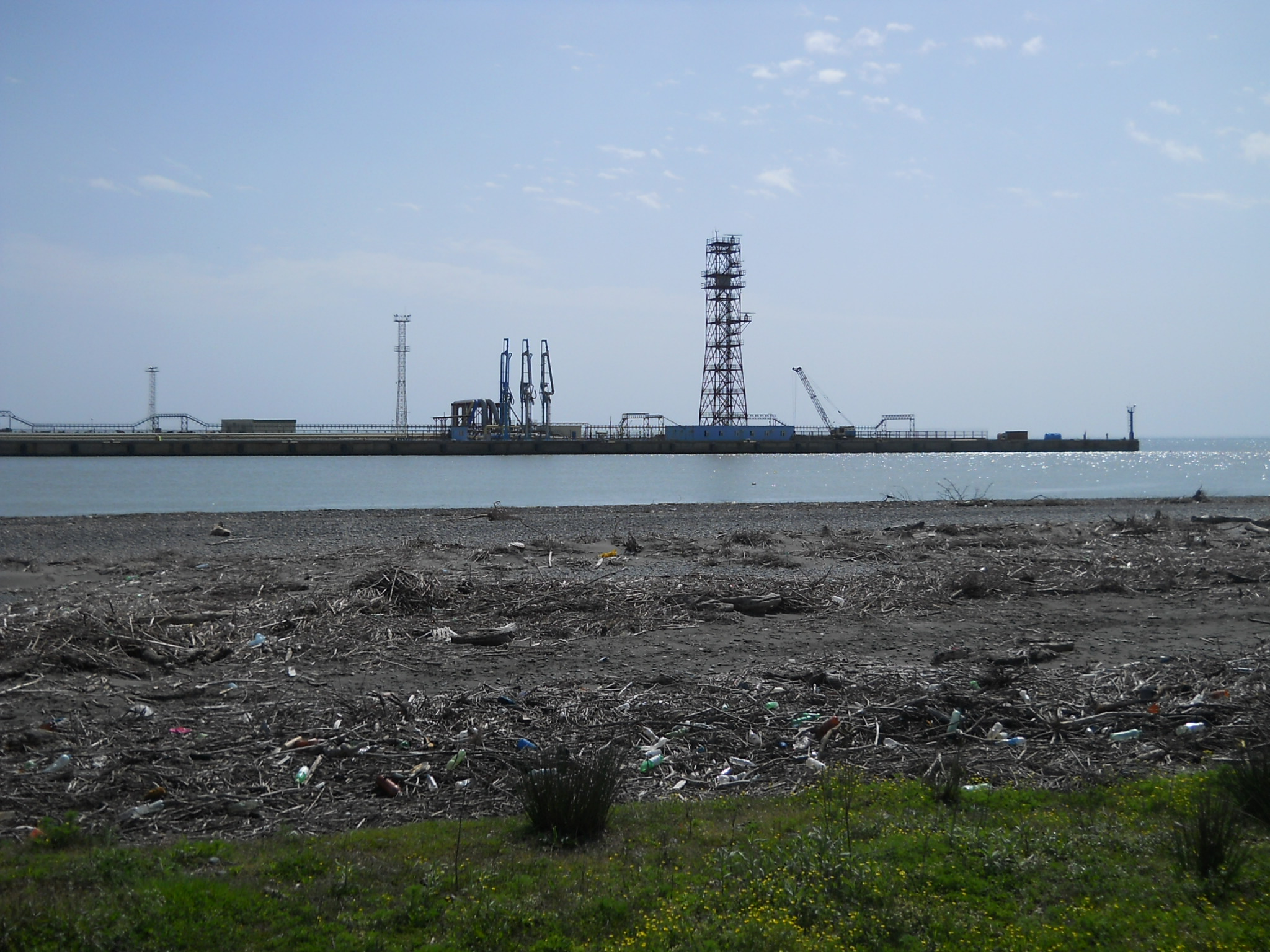
- Interactive map of Kulevi oil terminal

Location
- Country: Georgia
- Location: Kulevi, Khobi District
- Coordinates: 42.27°N 41.64°E
- UN/LOCODE: GEKUL

Details
- Opened: 16 May 2008
- Owned by: SOCAR

The Kulevi oil terminal is an oil port on the eastern Black Sea coast in Georgia. The terminal is located in Khobi District, close to the populated area of the village Kulevi, formerly Redoubt Kali, and from the coastal area between rivers Tsiva and Khobistskali.

== Construction ==
The Kulevi Oil Terminal project was originally authorised by president Shevardnadze's decree on September 8, 1999. Subsequently, the construction began near the village of Kulevi by Terminal 2000 Ltd, a partnership created between Argomar Oil Ltd and Georgian Railway. In late 2002 though, the project was put on hold, due to environmental concerns and insufficient funds. Construction resumed in September 2004 under an international consortium of investors led by a Georgian business tycoon Badri Patarkatsishvili. Two years later Patarkatsishvili sold his stake in Kulevi Terminal, then still under construction, to the State Oil Company of Azerbaijan (SOCAR) for an undisclosed sum of money.

The terminal was complete by November 2007 and was officially opened on 16 May 2008.

== Description ==
Kulevi Oil Terminal incorporates three piers, a canal for tankers, a mobile service fleet of 9 vessels, and a laboratory for oil and refined products testing. The terminal has a tank park with overall storage capacity of 320,000 cubic metres (11,000,000 cu ft) with the prospect of increase up to 380,000 cubic metres (13,000,000 cu ft). For loading operations there are two berths for receiving tankers with tonnage up to 100,000 tonnes. Loading performance is from 1,000 to 8,000 m3/h. The terminal has its own railway station, where 180 oil tank cars can be placed for discharging. The trestles make possible the simultaneous discharge of 168 oil tank cars, through four railway branches.

The terminal has annual processing capacity of 10 million tonnes of crude oil and refined products. SOCAR plans to increase the capacity of the terminal to 20 million tonnes per year. That would make Kulevi the largest oil terminal in South Caucasus.

== Ownership ==
The Kulevi oil terminal is owned and operated by the Black Sea Terminal Ltd., a subsidiary of the State Oil Company of Azerbaijan Republic.

== See also ==
- List of ports in Georgia (country)
