= Chornomorsk urban hromada =

Coordinates: 46°19′59.9″N 30°39′0.0″E

Chornomorsk urban hromada Чорноморська міська громада
- Hromada
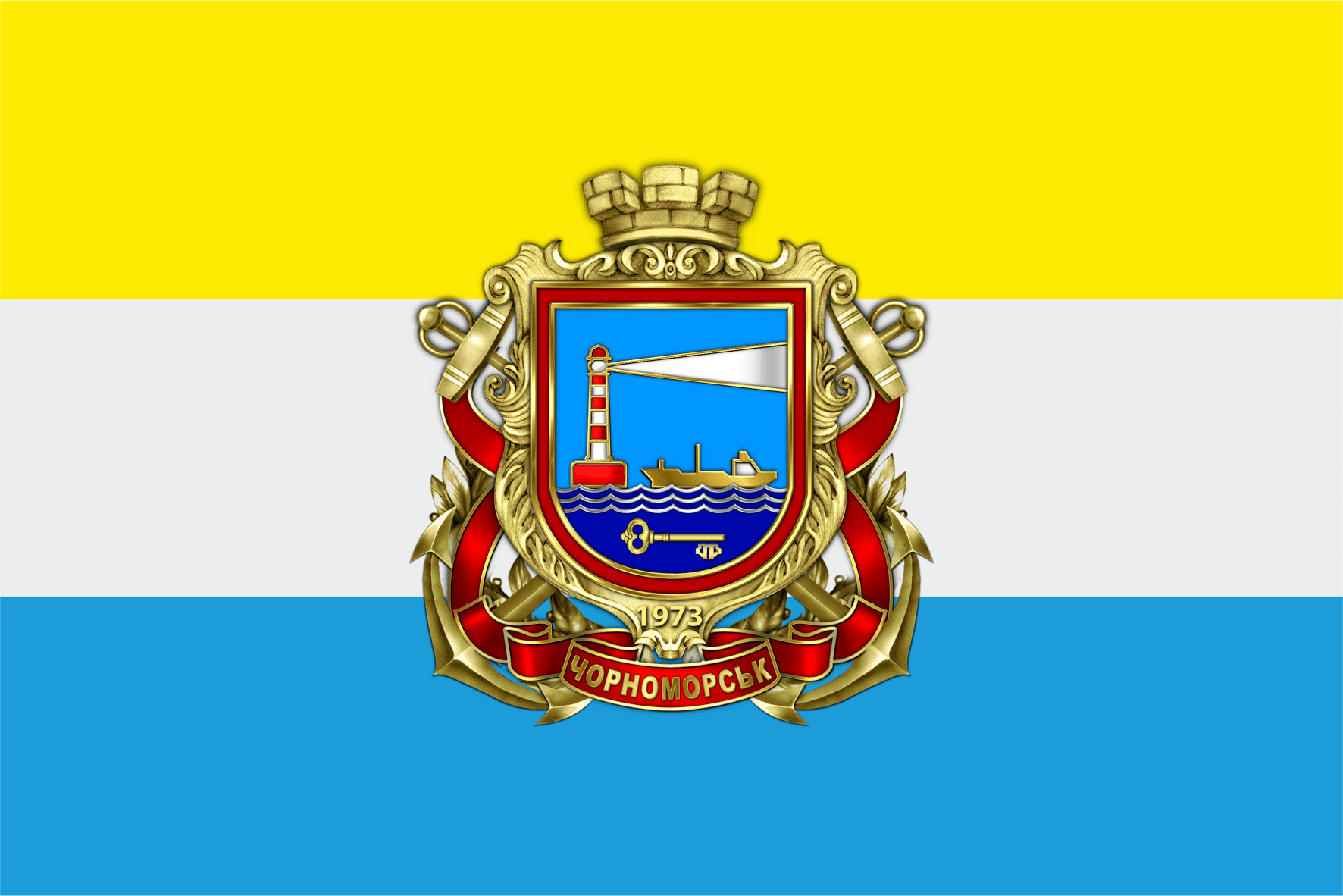
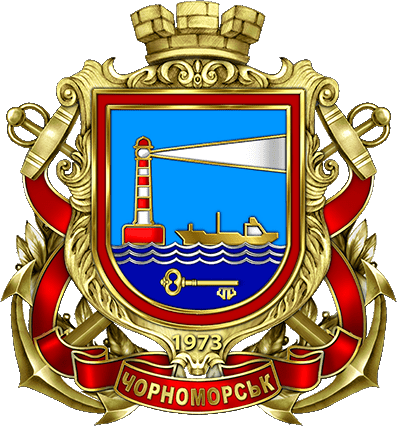
- Flag Coat of arms
- Interactive map of Chornomorsk urban hromada
- Country: Ukraine
- Oblast: Odesa Oblast
- Raion: Odesa Raion
- Admin. center: Chornomorsk

Area
  - Total: 25.2 km^{2} (9.7 sq mi)

Population (2020)
  - Total: 71,733
  - Density: 2,850/km^{2} (7,370/sq mi)
- CATOTTG code: UA51100370000040590
- Settlements: 4
- Cities: 1
- Rural settlements: 1
- Villages: 2

Chornomorsk urban hromada (Ukrainian: Чорноморська міська громада) is a hromada in Odesa Raion of Odesa Oblast in southwestern Ukraine. Population: 71,733 (2020 est.)

The hromada consists of a city of Chornomorsk, one rural settlement (Oleksandrivka) and two villages (Burlacha Balka and Malodolynske).

== Links ==
- Chornomorsk urban hromada // Облікова картка на офіційному вебсайті Верховної Ради України.
- картка Постанови ВР
- картка громади на порталі «Децентралізація»
