= Port of Chornomorsk =

Coordinates: 46°19′44″N 30°39′34″E

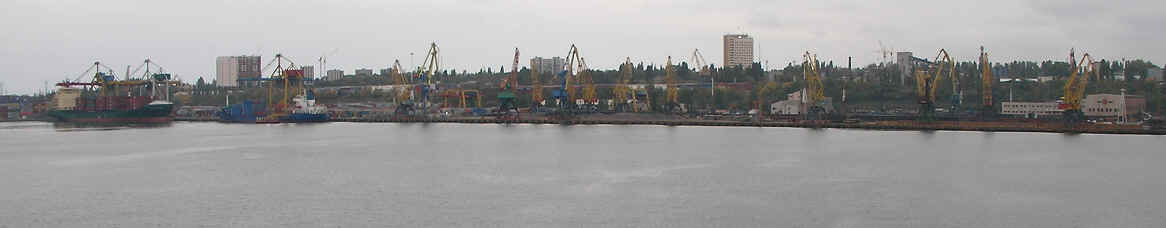
- Interactive map of Port of Chornomorsk

Location
- Country: Ukraine
- Location: Chornomorsk, Odesa region

Details
- Opened: 1958
- Owned by: Ukrainian Sea Ports Authority
- Type of Harbor: Natural/Artificial
- Chief: Vyacheslav Voloshyn

Statistics
- Website; Official website

The Port of Chornomorsk, or Sea Port of Chornomorsk (Ukrainian: Морський порт Чорноморськ, romanized: Morskyi port Chornomorsk), is a port in the city of Chornomorsk, Ukraine. It is located on the north-western shore of Black Sea at Sukhyi Estuary, to the south-west from Odesa.

The Port of Chornomorsk is a universal seaport. Across the estuary in the village of Burlacha Balka is located the Illichivsk Fishing Seaport and the Illichivsk ferry, while further inland is located the ship maintenance factory.

== History ==
The area around the port began to be developed at the end of the 18th century by German colonists and settlers from the Russian Empire, who established small farmsteads near the Sukhyi Estuary (which became known as Bugovy Farms). These were renamed Ilyichevsky Farm in 1927, and finally, in the late 1940s, construction began on Shipyard No. 490 within the estuary. The development of the actual port began in 1956 on the initiative of the Black Sea Shipping Company (BLASCO), and in October 1957 BLASCO formally issued an order to construct a new seaport and dredging work began. In 1958 the cranes were commissioned, and the first vessel, the Ukraine, entered the port on August 1958. In January 1961 the port was granted the status of an independent commercial seaport of the first category, and then the highest category in 1967. Throughout the 1970s, an automated control system, a ferry line, an interport base, and a specialized ro-ro complex was commissioned. Following the collapse of the Soviet Union, further modernization continued as a new container terminal was commissioned in 1995.

The city Chornomorsk, where the port is located, used to be named Illichivsk; due to decommunization laws, Chornomorsk gained its current name in February 2016. Major dredging work was carried out between 2018 and 2020, which increased the depths of the port's water area to 14.6 meters for Panamax vessels. During 2024, the port was fined 2 million hryvnias by the Antimonopoly Committee of Ukraine for "abuse of its dominant position in the market", which was made under Article 50 of the Law of Ukraine.

In 2025, Ukraine announced a 40-year concession plant for the port, which covers its container and terminals, which the Ministry of Development delegation stated was in order to modernize and expand the existing terminals. The First and Container Terminals of the port, however, will remain under state ownership. The lease project was prepared with the help of the International Finance Corporation and the European Bank for Reconstruction and Development. The project is expected to have a handling capacity of up to 760,000 TEU and more than 5 million tons of cargo annually. The first meetings for the commission on the decision of determining the investor of the port were held in September, and led by Deputy Minister of Community Development, Andriy Kashuba.

== See also ==
- UkrFerry
