= Redoubt Kali =

Coordinates: 42°16′21″N 41°38′47″E

- რედუტ-კალე
- Poti, Georgia (country)
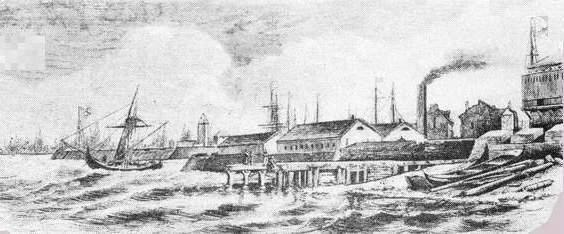
- Redout Kale port in the 1840s

Site information
- Type: Redoubt

Site history
- Built: 19th-century
- Fate: Demolished, 1907

Redoubt Kali (Georgian: რედუტ-კალე) was a Russian fort on the east coast of the Black Sea. It was 10 miles north of Poti. It was captured by the British during the Crimean War in 1854. The redoubt was colloquially commonly called the Redut Kale, modern Kulevi in Georgia. The redoubt was demolished in the early 20th-century in 1907.

== See also ==
- Black Sea Coast
