= Khobi =

Khobi ხობი
- Town
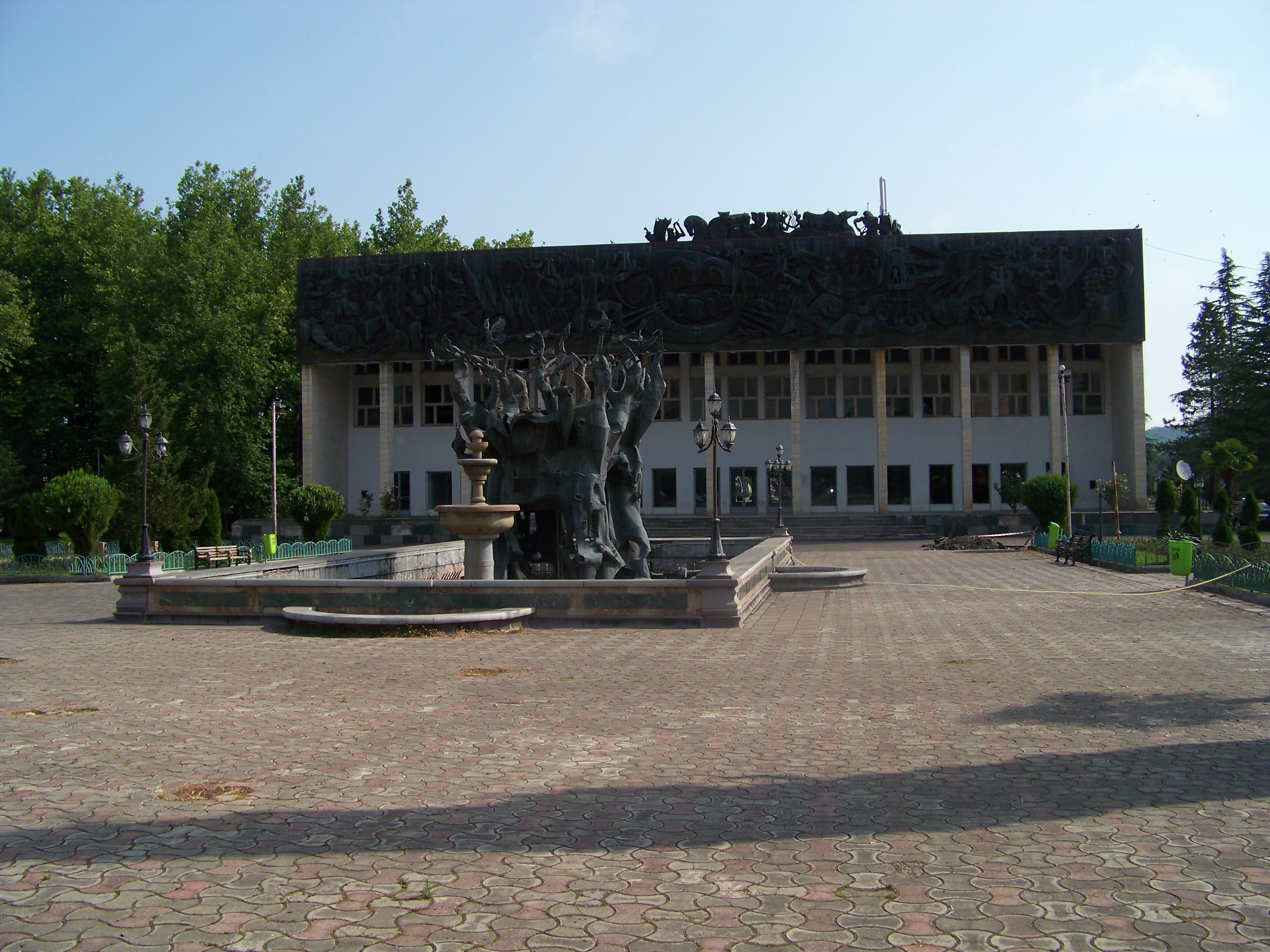

- Location in Georgia Khobi (Samegrelo-Zemo Svaneti)
- Coordinates: 42°19′N 41°54′E
- Country: Georgia
- Region: Samegrelo-Zemo Svaneti
- District: Khobi
- Town from: 1981
- Elevation: 25 m (82 ft)

Population (2024)
  - Total: 3,098
- Time zone: UTC+4 (Georgian Time)
- Area code: +995 414
- Website: http://www.khobi.ge

Khobi (Georgian: ხობი) is a town in western Georgia with a population of 4,242. The settlement of Khobi acquired the status of a town in 1981 and currently functions as an administrative center of the Khobi District within the Samegrelo-Zemo Svaneti region.

== See also ==
- Samegrelo-Zemo Svaneti
