= Oleksii Danchenko =

Soviet politician

Oleksii Yevhenovych Danchenko (Note: Also Aleksey Yevgenyevich Danchenko (Russian: Алексей Евгеньевич Данченко)) (Ukrainian: Олексій Євгенович Данченко; 9 [22] March 1904 – 1 October 1983) was a Soviet Ukrainian politician and naval officer. Danchenko was the head of the Black Sea Shipping Company, Hero of Socialist Labor, holder of government awards, deputy of the Council of the Union of the Supreme Soviet of the USSR of the 5th-8th convocations from the Odesa-Leninsky constituency of Odesa Oblast, deputy of the Supreme Soviet of the Ukrainian SSR 2nd convocation. Member of the Audit Commission of the Central Committee of the Communist Party of Ukraine in 1952-1954 and 1961–1966. Member of the Central Committee of the Communist Party of Ukraine in 1966–1976.

== Legacy ==
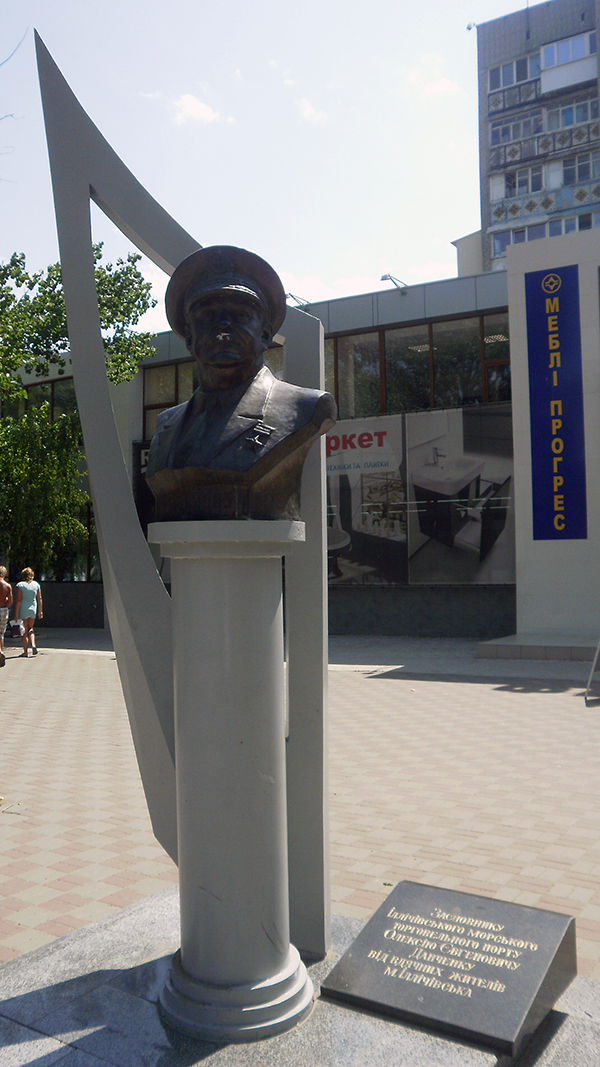
Monument of Oleksii Dalchenko, the founder of the port city of Chornomorsk

== Documents ==
- Депутаты Верховного Совета СССР 8-го созыва. — М., 1970. (in Russian)
- Украинская Советская энциклопедия, второе издание. Том 3. — К., 1979. (in Russian)
