= Khobi Municipality =

Coordinates: 42°19′N 41°54′E

Khobi Municipality ხობის მუნიციპალიტეტი
- Municipality
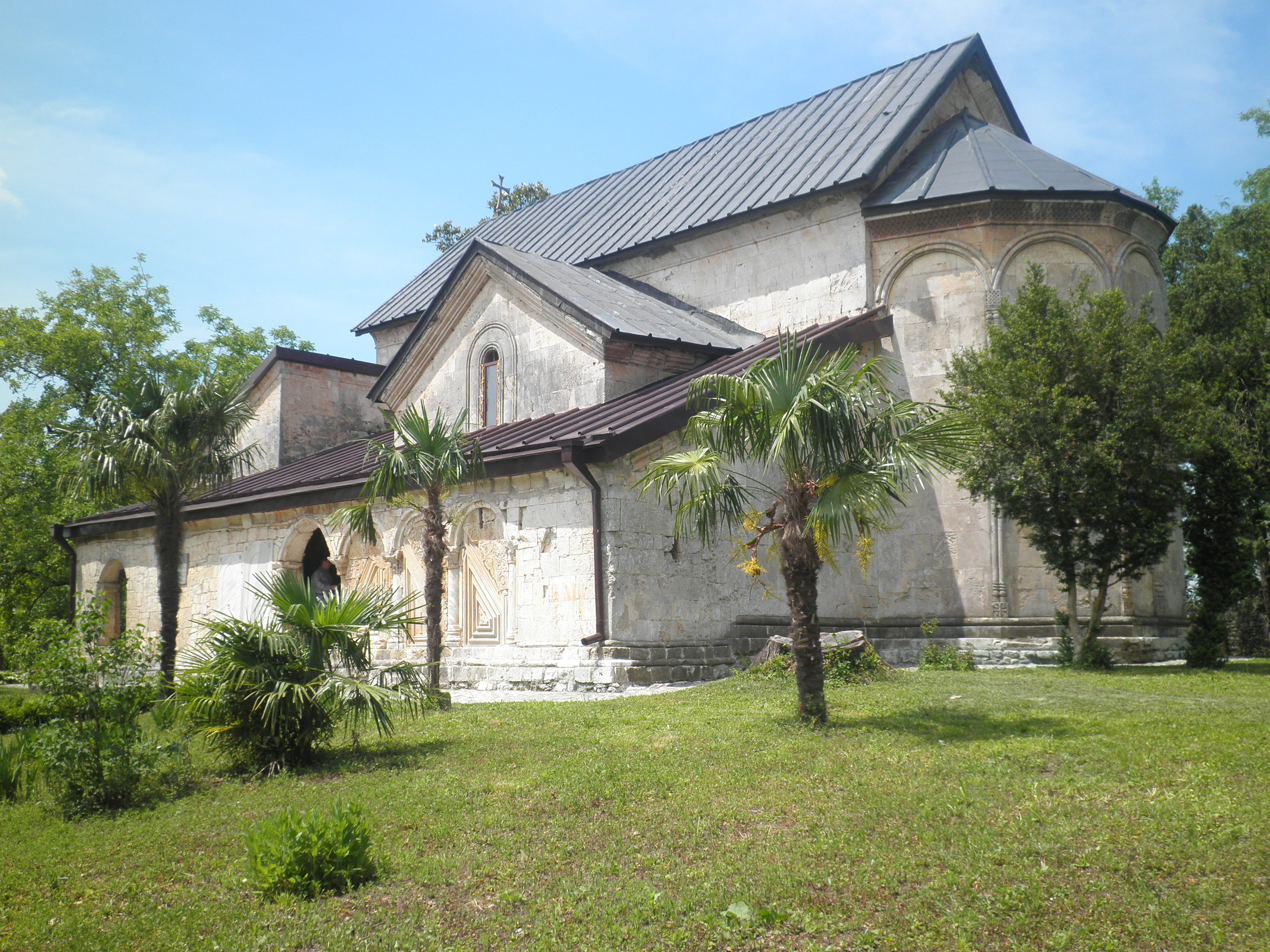
- Khobi Monastery

- Flag Seal

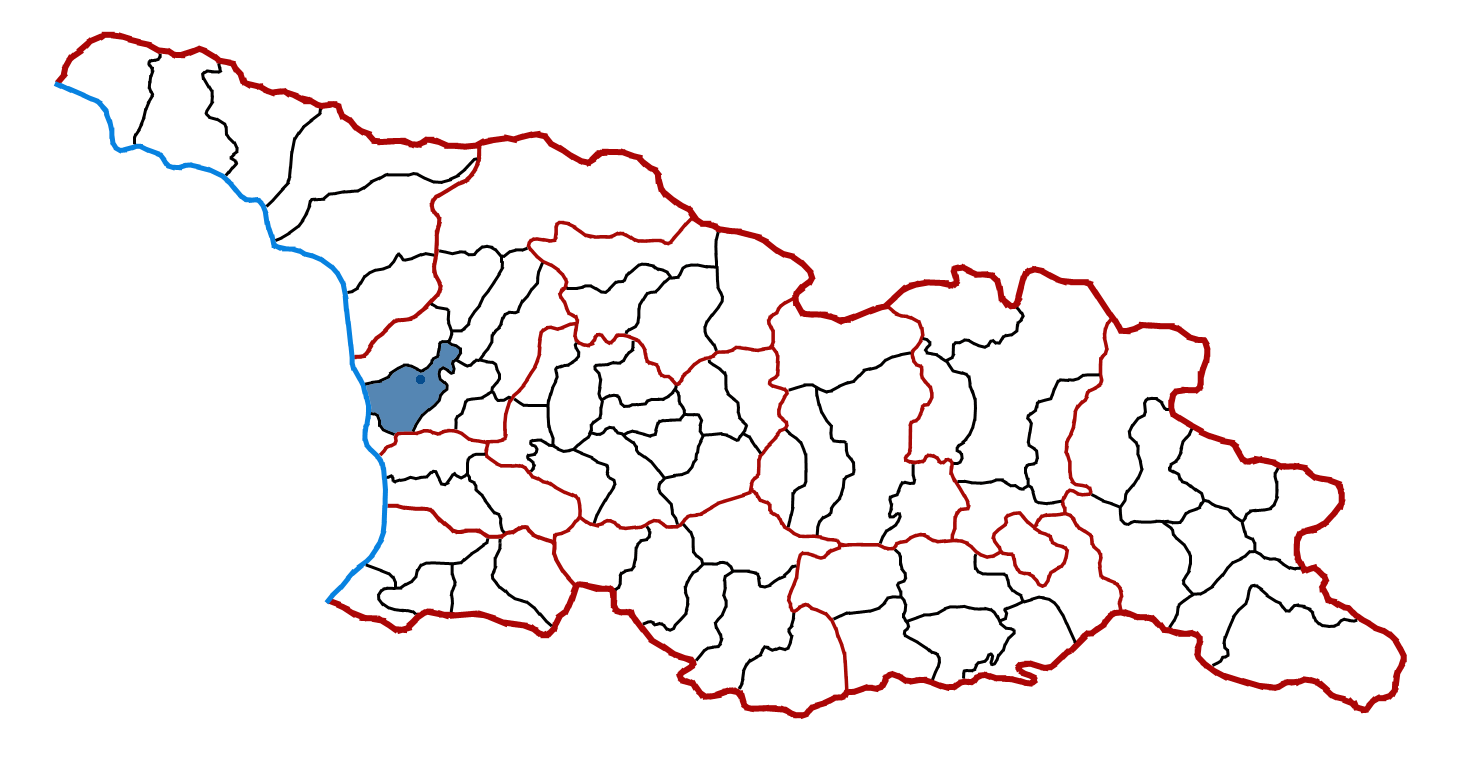
- Location of the municipality within Georgia
- Country: Georgia
- Region: Samegrelo-Zemo Svaneti
- Administrative centre: Khobi

Government
  - Body: Khobi Municipal Assembly
  - Mayor: Davit Bukia

Area
  - Total: 659.2 km^{2} (254.5 sq mi)

Population (2014)
  - Total: 30,548
  - Density: 46.3/km^{2} (120/sq mi)

Population by ethnicity
  - Georgians: 99.59 %
  - Russians: 0.22 %
  - Ukrainians: 0.10 %
- Time zone: UTC+4 (Georgian Standard Time)
- Website: www.khobi.ge/index.php

Khobi (Georgian: ხობის მუნიციპალიტეტი, Xobis municiṗaliṫeṫi) is a district of Georgia, in the region of Samegrelo-Zemo Svaneti. Its main town is Khobi. The population was 30,548, as of the 2014 census. The total area is 659 square kilometres (254 sq mi).

== Politics ==
Khobi Municipal Assembly (Georgian: ხობის საკრებულო) is a representative body in Khobi Municipality, consisting of 36 members, which is elected every four years. The last election was held in October 2021. Davit Bukia of Georgian Dream was elected mayor through a 2nd round against a candidate of the United National Movement.

Party	2017	2021	Current Municipal Assembly
Georgian Dream	29	20	
Ahali		10 (Note: Split from UNM.)	
For Georgia		2	
United National Movement	3	1	
People's Power		1 (Note: Split from Georgian Dream.)	
Independent		2 (Note: Nugzar Shushania and Maka Chartia - expelled from For Georgia.)	
European Georgia	2		
Labour Party	1		
Alliance of Patriots	1		
Development Movement	1		
Total	37	36	

== Administrative division ==
There are 1 city and 21 administrative units with 56 villages in the municipality.

1 city - Khobi

15 communities - Akhalsopeli, Akhali Khibula, Bia, Gurifuli, Zemo Kvaloni, Torsa-Dghvaba, Nojikhevi, May 1, Sajijao, Kariata, Kvemo Kvaloni, Shua Khorga, Chaladidi, Khamiskuri, Kheta;

6 rural communities - Patara Poti, First Khorga, Sagvichio, Kulevi, Shavghele, Old Khibula.

== See also ==
- List of municipalities in Georgia (country)
