= KazTransOil =

KazTransOil JSC
- Native name: КазТрансОйл
- Company type: Public
- Traded as: KASE: KZTO
- Industry: Oil and gas
- Founded: 1997
- Headquarters: Astana, Kazakhstan
- Key people: Talgat Kurmanbayev (CEO)
- Services: Pipeline transport
- Revenue: ~ US$ 609 million (2015)
- Operating income: ~ US$ 216 million (2015)
- Net income: ~ US$ 127 million (2015)
- Owner: KazMunayGas (90%)
- Number of employees: 8 129 (2015)
- Subsidiaries: «Batumi Terminals Limited» (100%) «Kazakhstan-China Pipeline» LLP (50%) «MunaiTas»NWPC» JSC (51%)
- Website: www.kaztransoil.kz/en/

KazTransOil JSC (KASE: KZTO) is the national oil transporter in Kazakhstan accounting for 53% of all oil transported in the country. The company operates more than 8000 km of oil pipelines and 3,140 km of water pipelines. KazTransOil is a subsidiary of KazMunayGas, the national oil and gas company of Kazakhstan.

== Rating ==
In July 2012, Standard & Poor’s assessed KazTransOil’s SACP at “bb+”, on the basis of their opinion of its “satisfactory” business risk profile and “significant” financial risk profile. KazTransOil’s stand-alone credit quality is supported by long-term ship-or-pay contracts with oil producers, the company’s favourable debt structure and maturity profile, limited competition from alternative oil export pipelines, and good prospects for oil production and export in Kazakhstan. KazTransOil benefits from low transportation costs and a strong market position in Kazakhstan because of its vast pipeline system. KazTransOil distributes more than 57% of Kazakhstan’s total oil exports. The rating is constrained by significant dependence on Russian pipeline operator OAO AK Transneft (BBB/Stable/--), construction risk related to pipeline capacity expansion projects, an opaque tariff regime and irregular tariff revisions, and operational risk due to aging assets.
