= Poti Sea Port =

Seaport and harbor in Poti, Georgia

Port of Poti
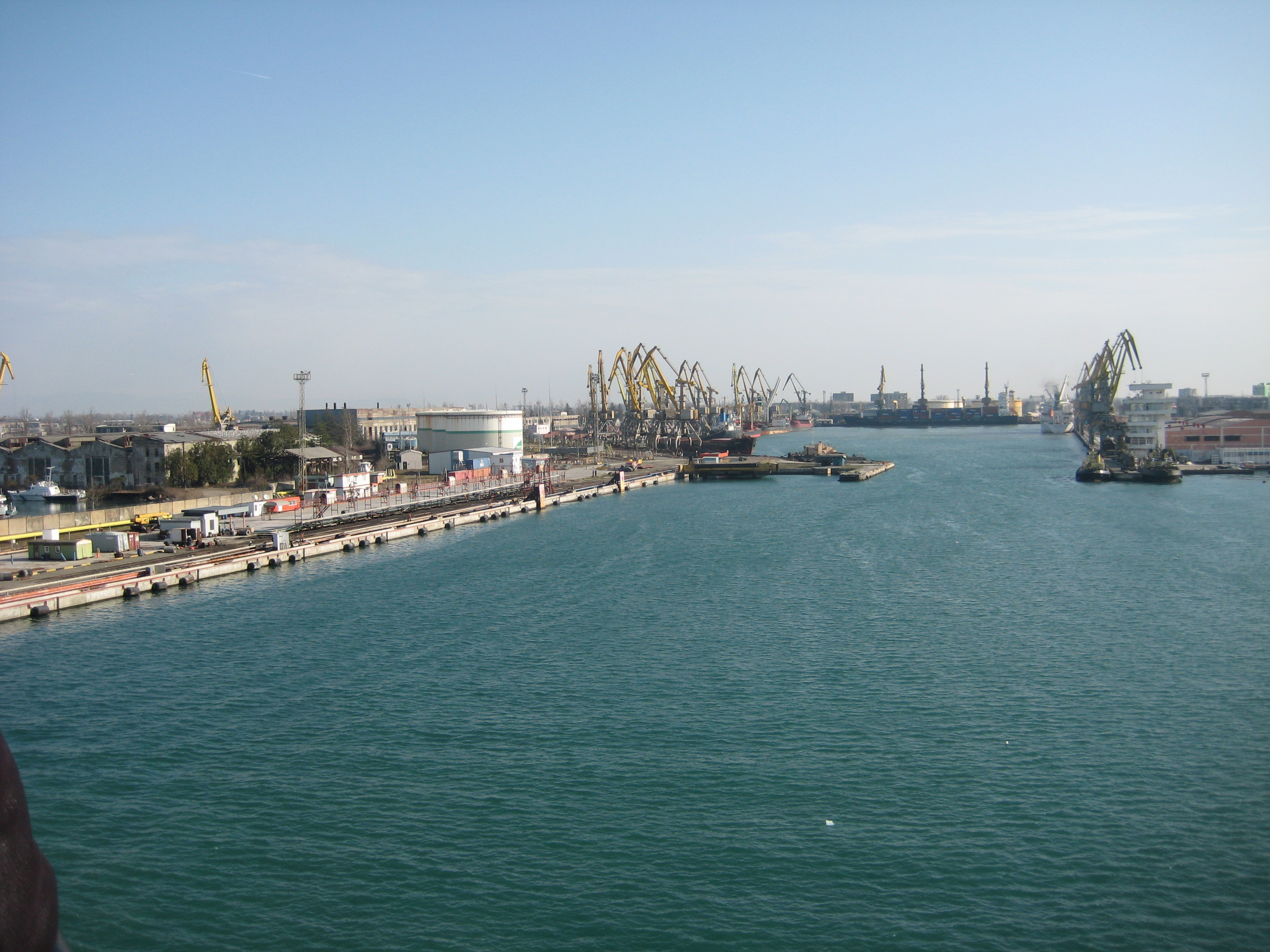
- Interactive map of Port of Poti

Location
- Country: Georgia
- Location: Poti
- UN/LOCODE: GEPTI

Details
- Opened: 7 May 1905 by Niko Nikoladze
- Owned by: APM Terminals (80%)
- Size: 49 ha (120 acres)

Statistics
- Annual cargo tonnage: ▲7.7 million tons (2007)
- Annual container volume: ▲185,000 TEU (2007)
- Website http://www.potiseaport.com

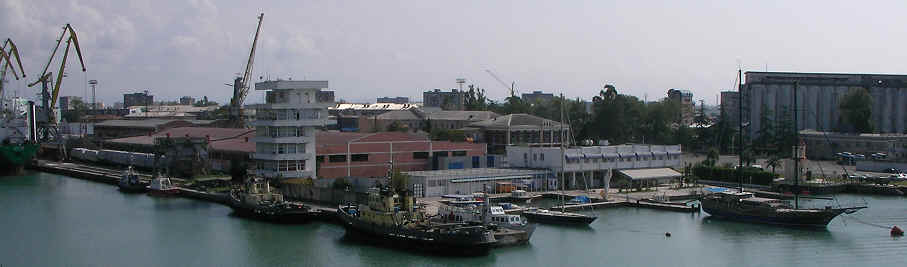
The Poti seaport

The Poti Sea Port (Georgian: ფოთის საზღვაო ნავსადგური, p’ot’is sazghvao navsadguri) is a major seaport and harbor off the eastern Black Sea coast at the mouth of the Rioni River in Poti, Georgia. Its UN/LOCODE is GEPTI and is located at 42°9′18″N 41°39′16″E

The Poti seaport is a cross point of the Trans-Caucasian Corridor/TRACECA, a multinational project which connects the Romanian port of Constanţa and Bulgarian port Varna with the landlocked countries of the Caspian region and Central Asia.

== History ==
The construction of a seaport at Poti was conceived shortly after 1828, when the Russian Empire conquered the town from the Ottoman Empire which controlled it since the fractioning of the Kingdom of Georgia. In 1858, Poti was granted the status of a port city, but it was not until 1899 when, under the patronage of the mayor of Poti Niko Nikoladze, the construction entered the sprint stages and was completed by 1907. The seaport has since reconstructed several times, most recently under the sponsorship of the Dutch government and the European Union.

In 2007, the total throughput was 7.7 million tons and container handling was 185,000 TEU.

== Privatization and current ownership ==
In April 2008, Georgia sold a 51 percent stake of the Poti port area to the Ras Al Khaimah Investment Authority (RAKIA), a company owned by the emirate of Ras Al Khaimah, a member of the United Arab Emirates (UAE). RAKIA was tasked with managing the new port terminal and, through its Georgian subsidiary RAKIA Georgia Free Industrial Zone LLC, with developing a Free Industrial Zone (FIZ) in a 49-year management concession. The new FIZ was officially inaugurated by the President of Georgia Mikheil Saakashvili on 15 April 2008. In 2009, RAKIA UAE acquired the remaining 49 percent stake of the port. However, following the Dubai debt crisis of November 2009, Sheikh Sheikh Saud Bin Saqr decided to sell off most assets held abroad in October 2010. This focus on domestic priorities was prompted by the disputed succession in Ras Al Khaimah following the death of Saud's father, Sheikh Saqr Bin Muhammad Al Qasimi, and the need for Saud Bin Saqr to provide for his subjects. Subsequently, 80 percent of the port was sold in April 2011 to APM Terminals, a unit of Denmark's A.P. Moller-Maersk. On 8 September 2011, RAKIA Georgia FIZ decided to alienate 15 percent of its shares in favor of Georgian businessman Gela ("Zaza") Mikadze in recognition of his management, making him a minority partner in the FIZ. Mikadze owns these shares through the UK based Manline Projects LLP company, which is owned by offshore companies belonging to Mikadze.

== Gallery ==
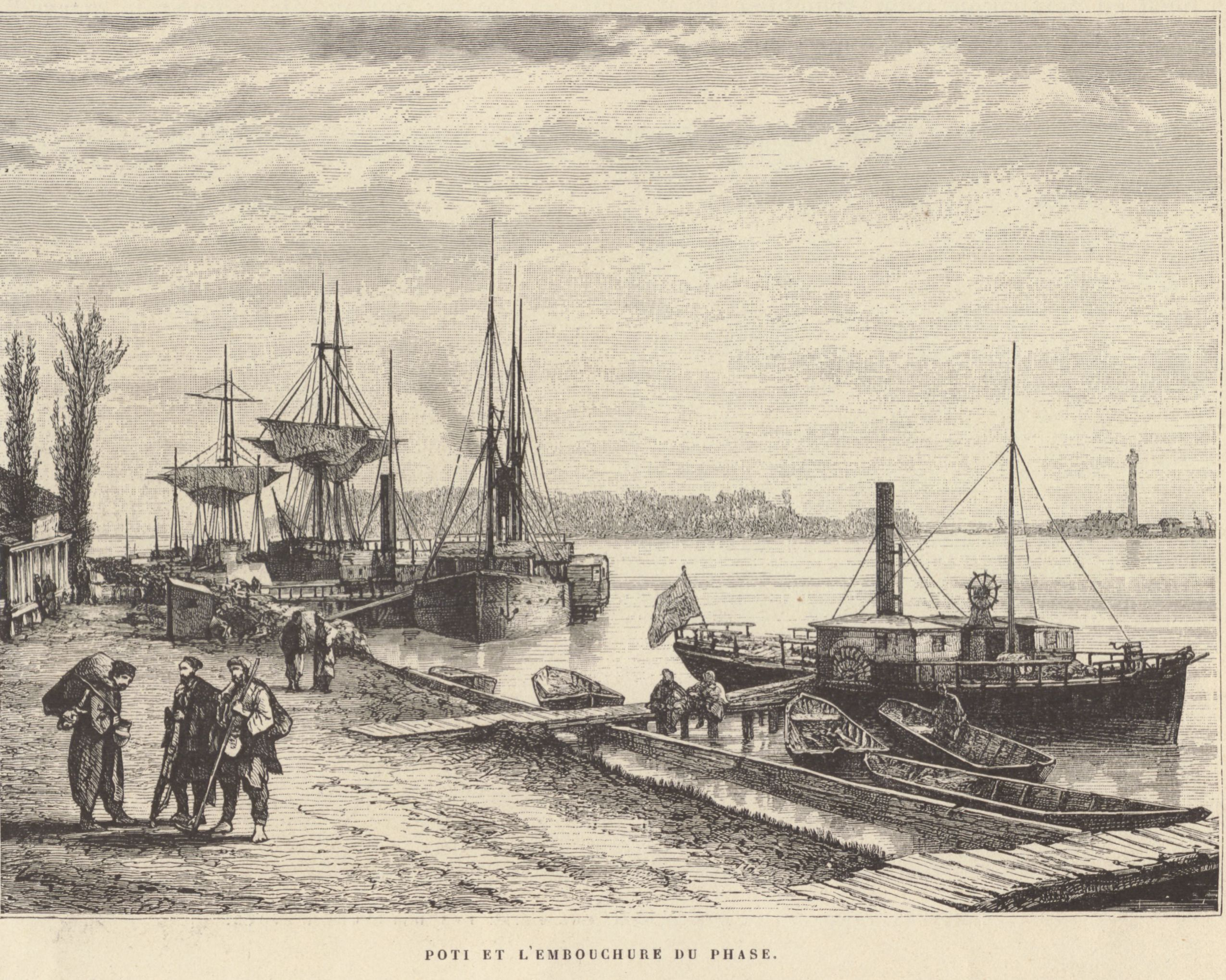

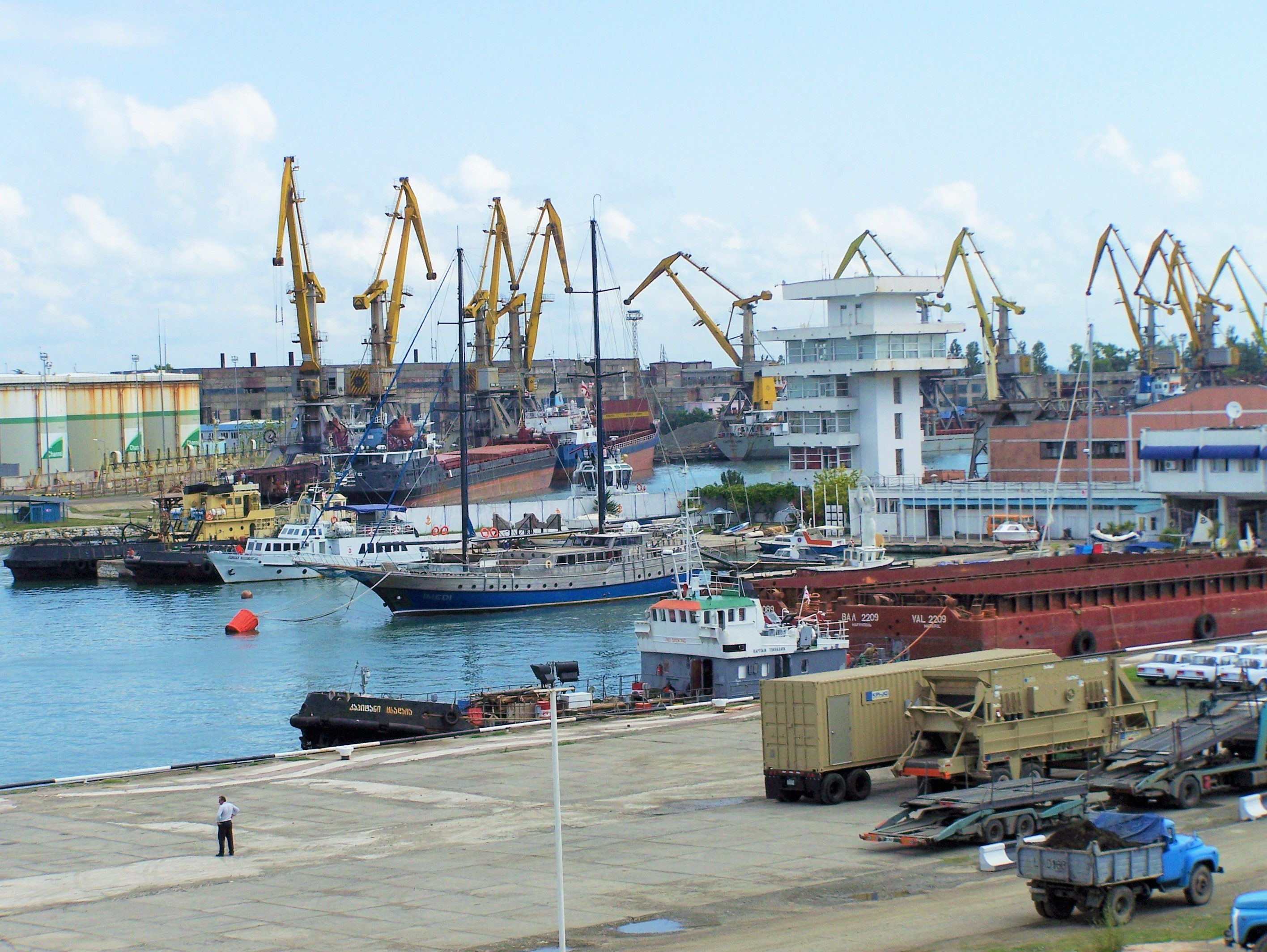

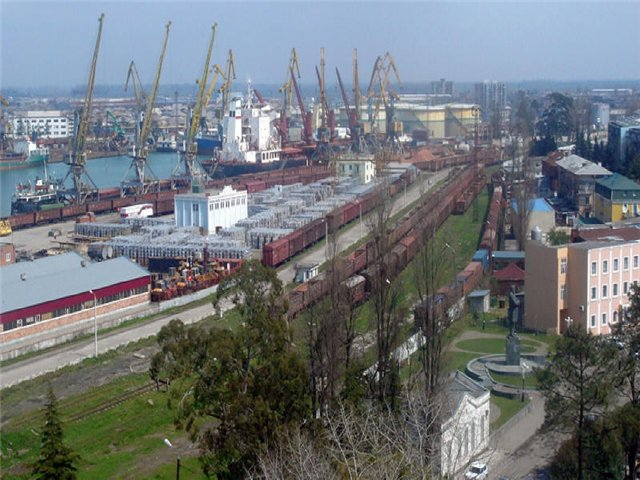

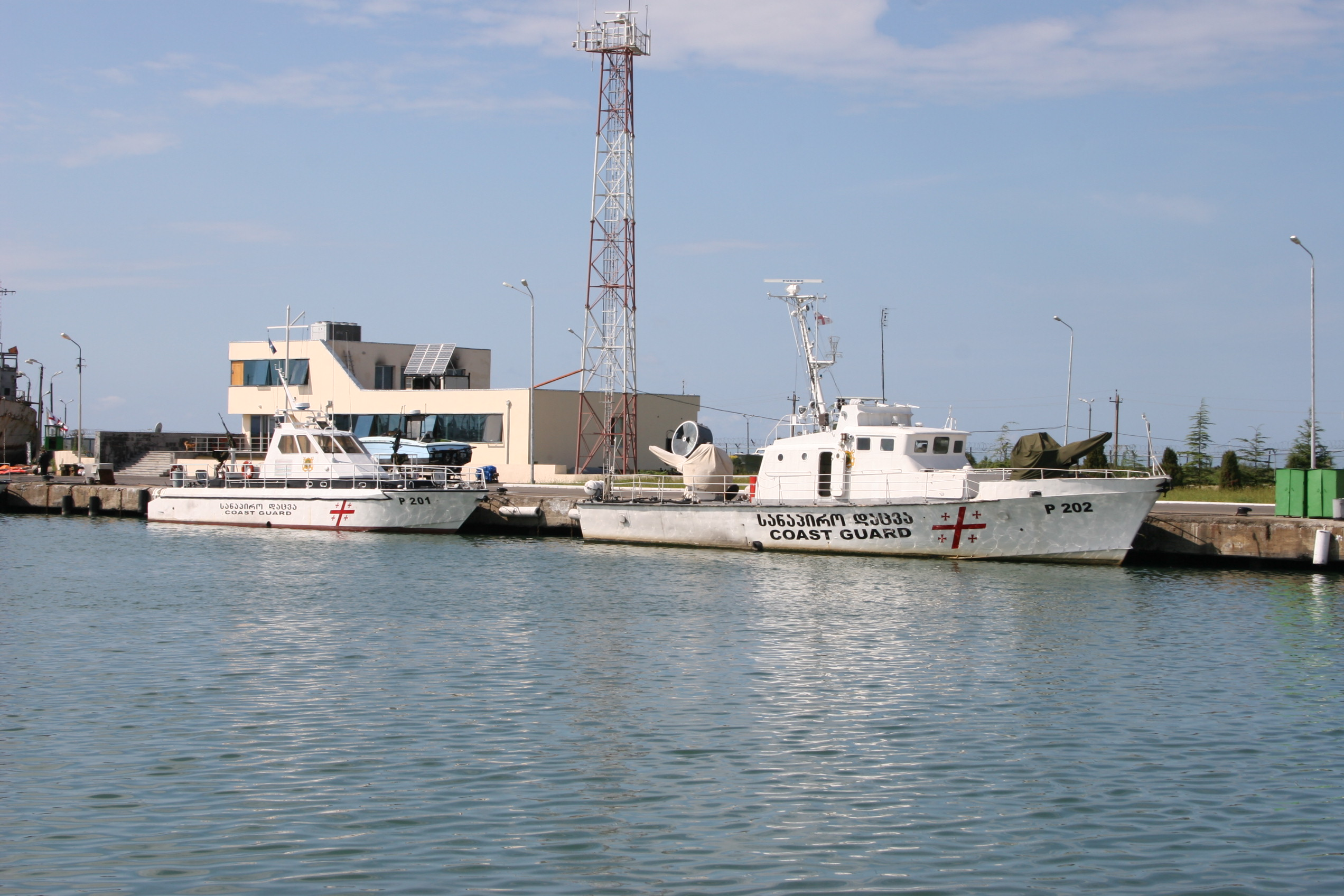

== See also ==
- List of ports in Georgia (country)
