= Chornomorsk =

City in Odesa Oblast, Ukraine

Chornomorsk Чорноморськ
- City
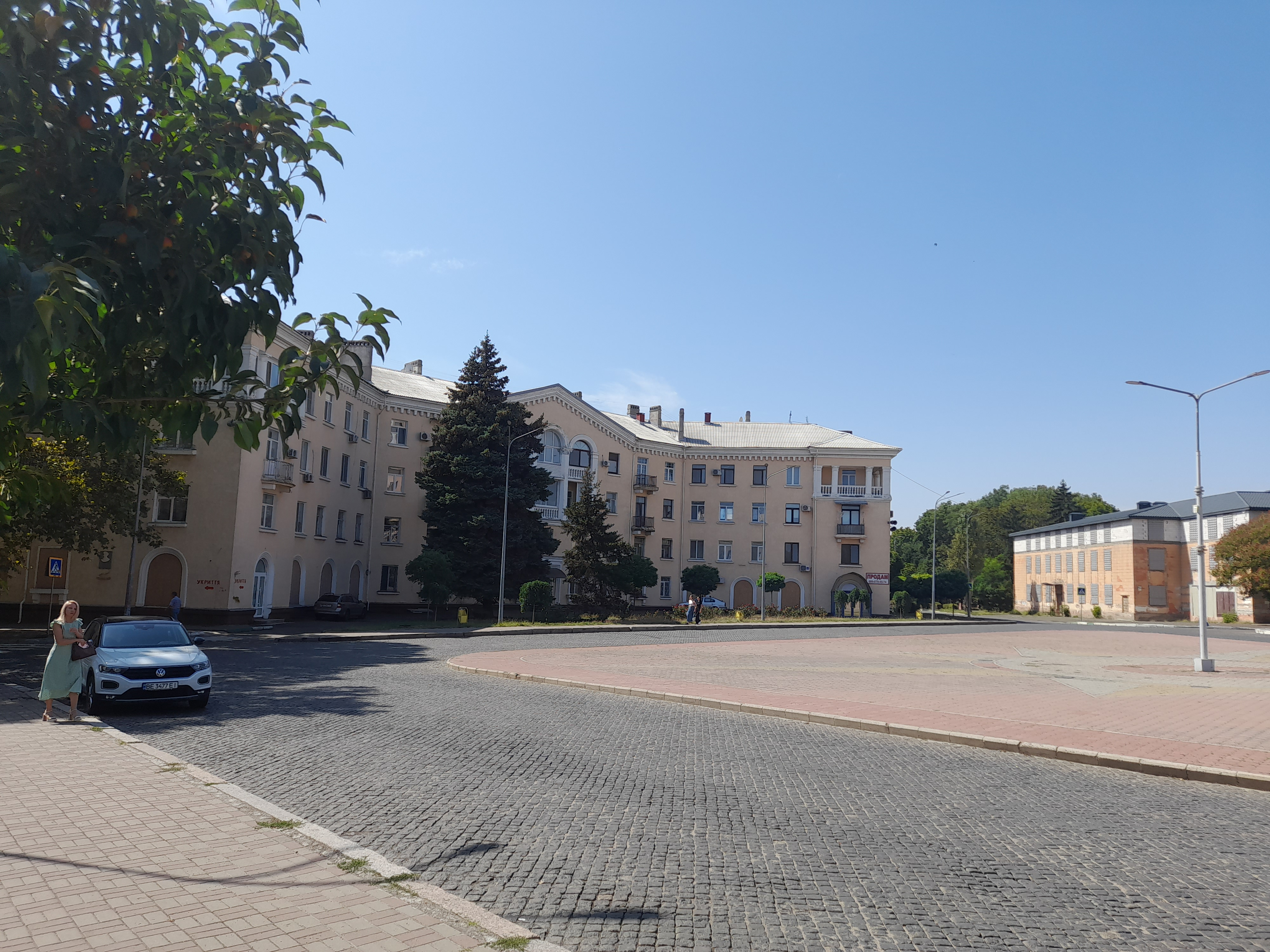
- Strebka Square - the oldest part of the city

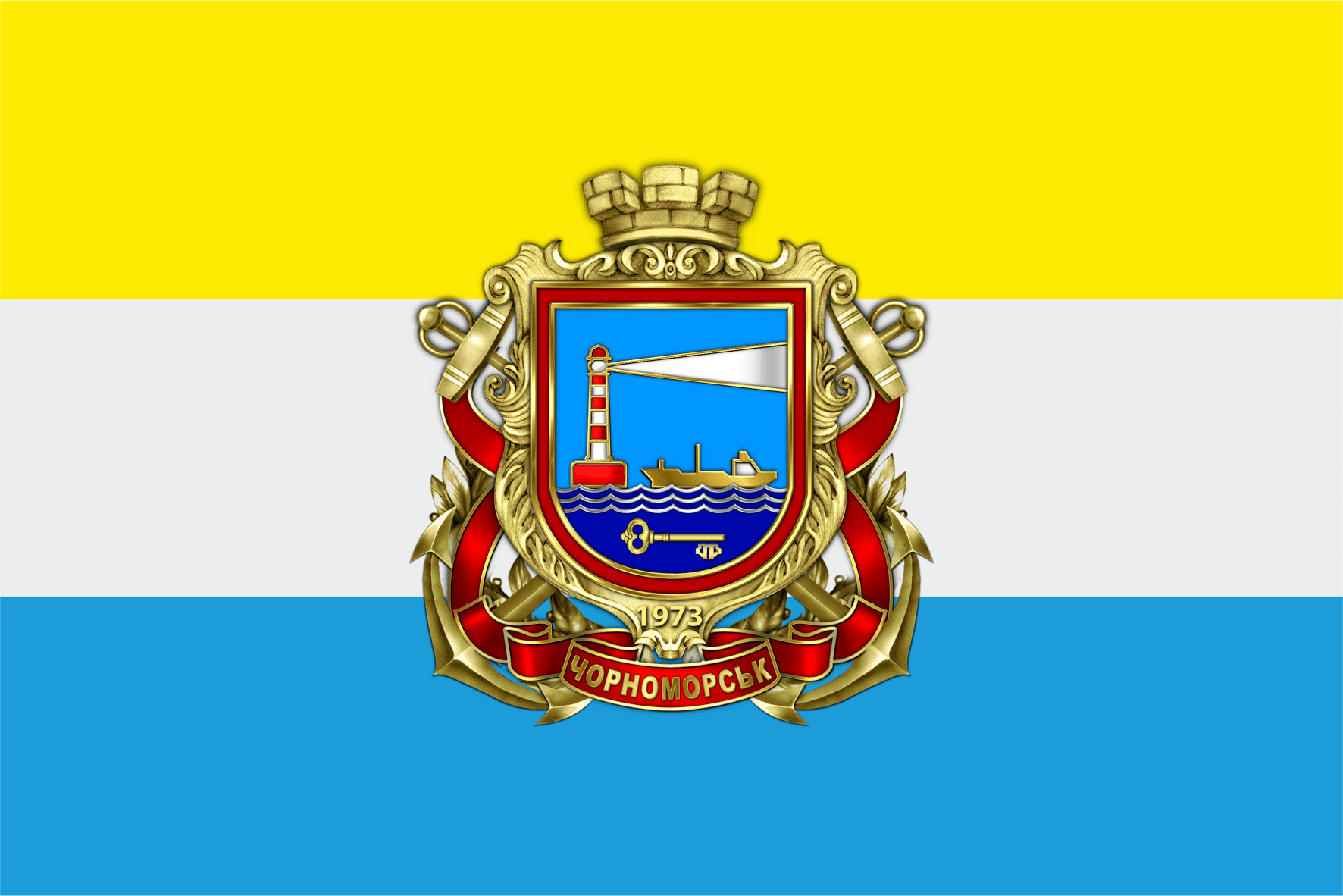
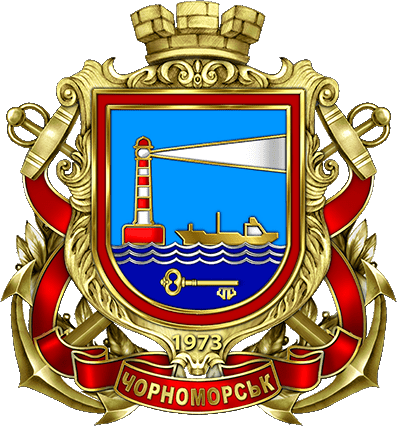
- Flag Coat of arms

- Location within Odesa Oblast Location within Ukraine
- Coordinates: 46°18′06.0″N 30°39′25.0″E
- Country: Ukraine
- Oblast: Odesa Oblast
- Raion: Odesa Raion
- Hromada: Chornomorsk urban hromada

Government
  - Mayor: Vasyl Huliaiev

Area
  - Total: 25 km^{2} (9.7 sq mi)
- Elevation: 29 m (95 ft)

Population (2022)
  - Total: 57,983
- Time zone: UTC+2 (EET)
  - Summer (DST): UTC+3 (EEST)
- Postal code: 68000—68090
- Area code: +380 4868
- Climate: Cfb
- Website: cmr.gov.ua

Chornomorsk (Ukrainian: Чорноморськ, pronounced [tʃornoˈmɔrsʲk]), formerly Illichivsk (Ukrainian: Іллічівськ), is a city in Odesa Raion, Odesa Oblast, south-western Ukraine, dependent on the Port of Chornomorsk. It hosts the administration of Chornomorsk urban hromada, one of the hromadas of Ukraine. The city is located around the Sukhyi Estuary. Its population was given as 57,983 (2022 estimate).

Originally, the city was established as a satellite town of Odesa.

== Geography ==
Chornomorsk seafront

Chornomorsk is situated on the coast of the Black Sea, 12 miles (20 km) south from Odesa.

== History ==
Before the construction of a port with a city, the region was the site of a number of unorganized farmsteads and hamlets (Ukrainian: хутори, romanized: khutory, singular: khutir) that were collectively known as Buhovi khutory (Ukrainian: Бугові Хутори) that were located on agricultural lots of a local landowner, Andriy Buhovyi. After the establishment of the Soviet Union and the "nationalization" and collectivization of the area, in 1927 the settlement was renamed into Illichivskyi Khutir (Ильичёвы Хутора) in honour of Vladimir Ilyich Lenin. (Note: An alternative account associates the name not with Lenin (popularly/familiarly called "Ilyich" - Russian: Ильич) but with the Biblical prophet Elijah (Ukrainian: Ілля, romanized: Illya; Russian: Илия, romanized: Iliya).)

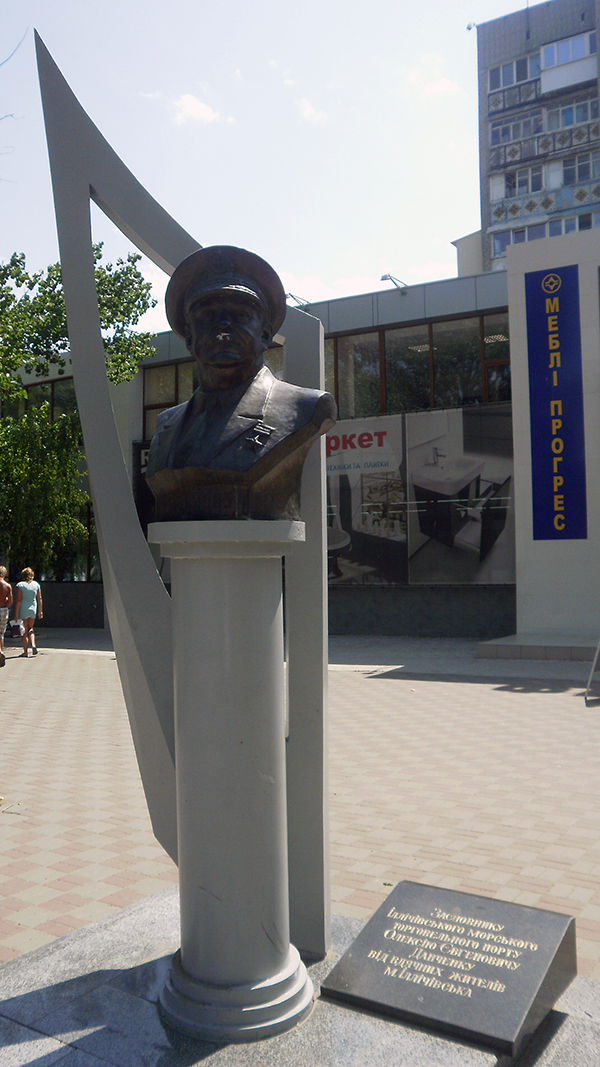
Monument of Oleksii Danchenko, the founder of the city

In 1952 a port was established, and its surrounding territory was urbanized and converted into a city called Illichivsk (Russian: Ильичёвск). The city was designed to become a new home for the Black Sea Shipping Company (then the largest operator of passenger and commercial vessels in the world). Originally a builder's trailer village, Chornomorsk has expanded to become Ukraine's most prosperous town by income per capita. Residents are mostly employed by the port (one of the largest ports of Europe) and in the maritime industry. Residents of Odesa have recently begun relocating to lower-cost but higher-income Chornomorsk.

On 15 May 2015 the President of Ukraine, Petro Poroshenko, signed a bill into law which began a six-months period for the removal of communist monuments and the mandatory renaming of settlements with names related to Communism. On 12 November 2015, the city council decided to rename the city to Chornomorsk (after the Black Sea (Ukrainian: Чорне море, romanized: Chorne more), on the coast of which the city stands). The decision was confirmed by the Verkhovna Rada (the Ukrainian parliament) on 4 February 2016. The city's former name, Illichivsk, was an homage to Vladimir Ilyich Lenin, the founder of the Soviet Union.

Until 18 July 2020, Chornomorsk was incorporated as a city of oblast significance and the center of Illichivsk Municipality. The municipality was abolished in July 2020 as part of the administrative reform of Ukraine, which reduced the number of raions of Odesa Oblast to seven. The area of Illichivsk Municipality was merged into Odesa Raion.

== Demographics ==
According to the 2001 Ukrainian Census:

Ethnicity	Proportion
Ukrainians	66.5%
Russians	28.5%
Bulgarians	1%
Moldovans, Belarusians, Romanians, and other	4%

== Economy ==
=== Train ferry service to Bulgaria ===
Chornomorsk was connected by freight train ferry line (426 km) to Varna in Bulgaria in 1978. There were train ferries, two Soviet and two Bulgarian, named "Hero of Odesa", "Hero of Sevastopol" and "Hero of Schipka", "Hero of Pleven", which could take in three decks a total of 108 two bogie (four axle) Soviet freight cars. In the first ten-year period (1978–1988), these train ferries had transported 1,000,000 freight cars between Illichivsk and Varna. This train ferry service took 17 hours in both directions. The Bulgarians built break of gauge apparatus at Varna which made it possible to change bogies of 24 freight cars in one hour thirty minutes.

=== Industries ===
Chornomorsk's economy is largely oriented to the sea. The biggest employer is the Port of Chornomorsk. The headquarters and manufacturing facilities of "Antarctica" (Ukraine's largest fishing company) are located in the city, and other major maritime shipping companies have also chosen to open their offices there.

The city also has a freight railway station. The port is on one of the freight routes of China's proposed Eurasian Land Bridge (part of the "New Silk Road"), which would see an eastern link to China via ferry to Georgia, Azerbaijan and across the Caspian Sea, and a western link by train to western Europe.

== International relations ==
=== Twin towns – Sister cities ===
Chornomorsk is twinned with:

- Narva, Estonia
- Beyoğlu, Istanbul, Turkey
- Maardu, Estonia
- Qaradağ raion, Baku, Azerbaijan
- Tczew, Poland
- (Georgia (country)) Poti, Georgia
- Boynton Beach, Florida, United States

== Gallery ==
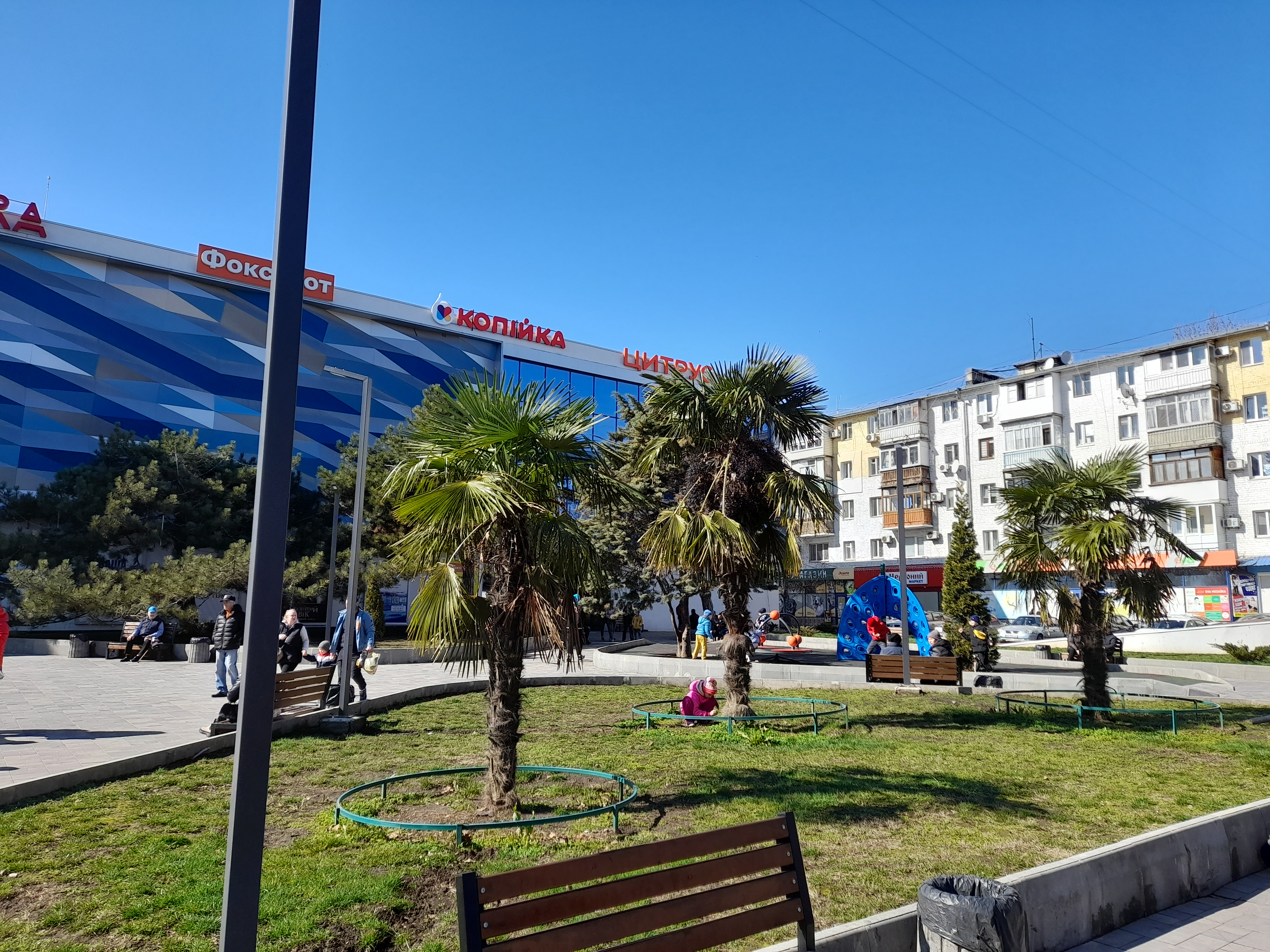
Chornomorsk downtown

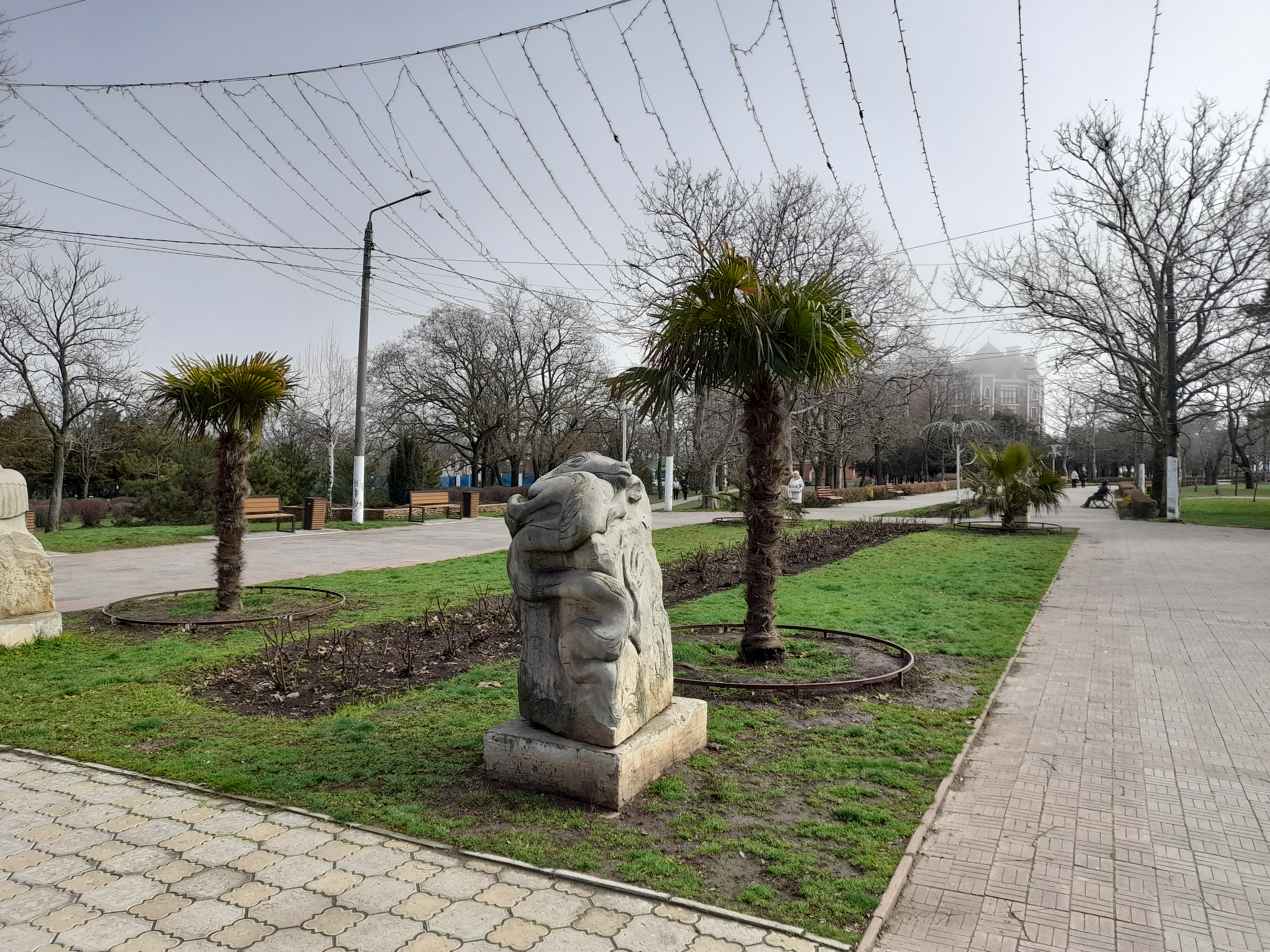
Prymorskyi Park

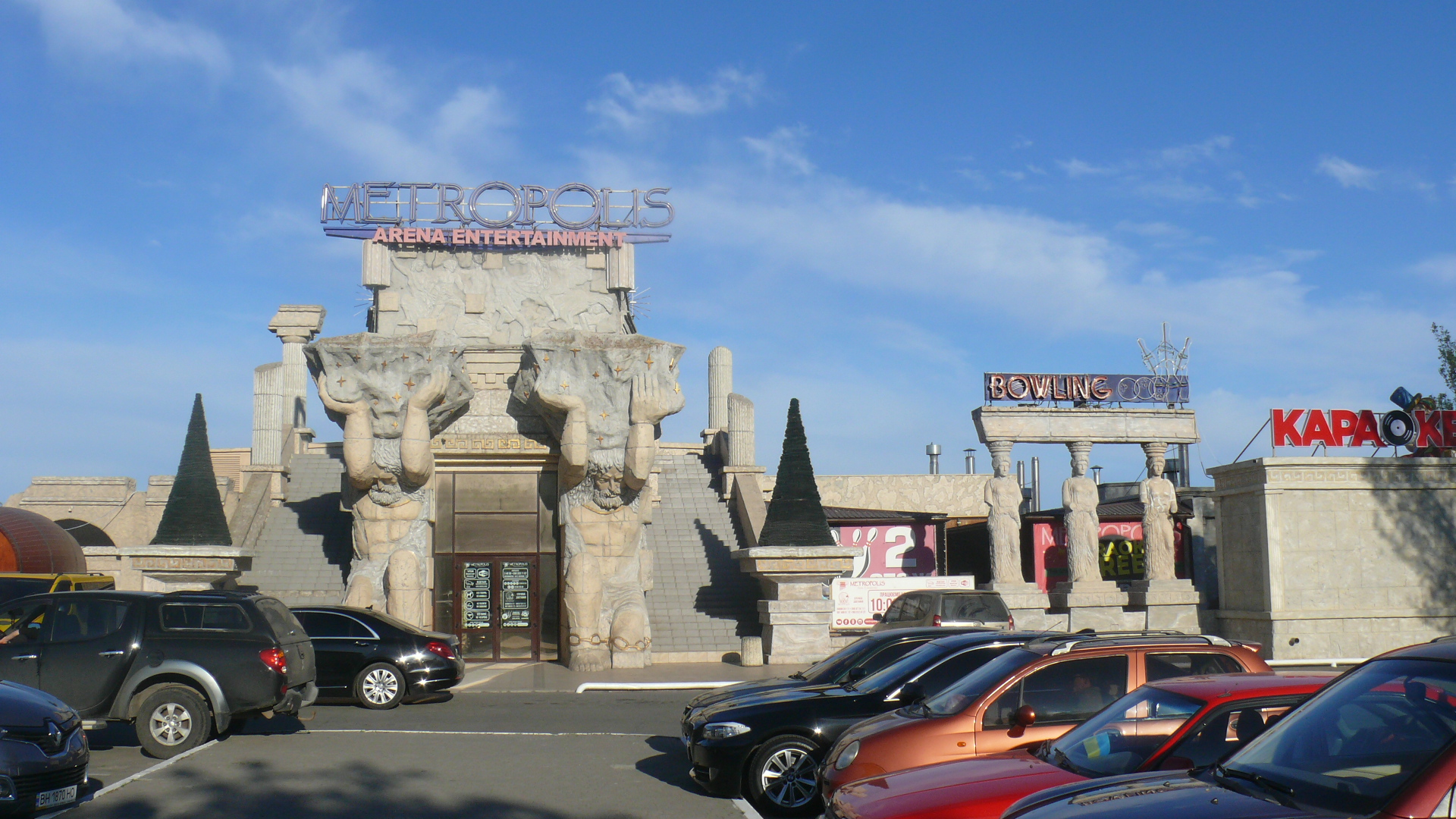
Night Club

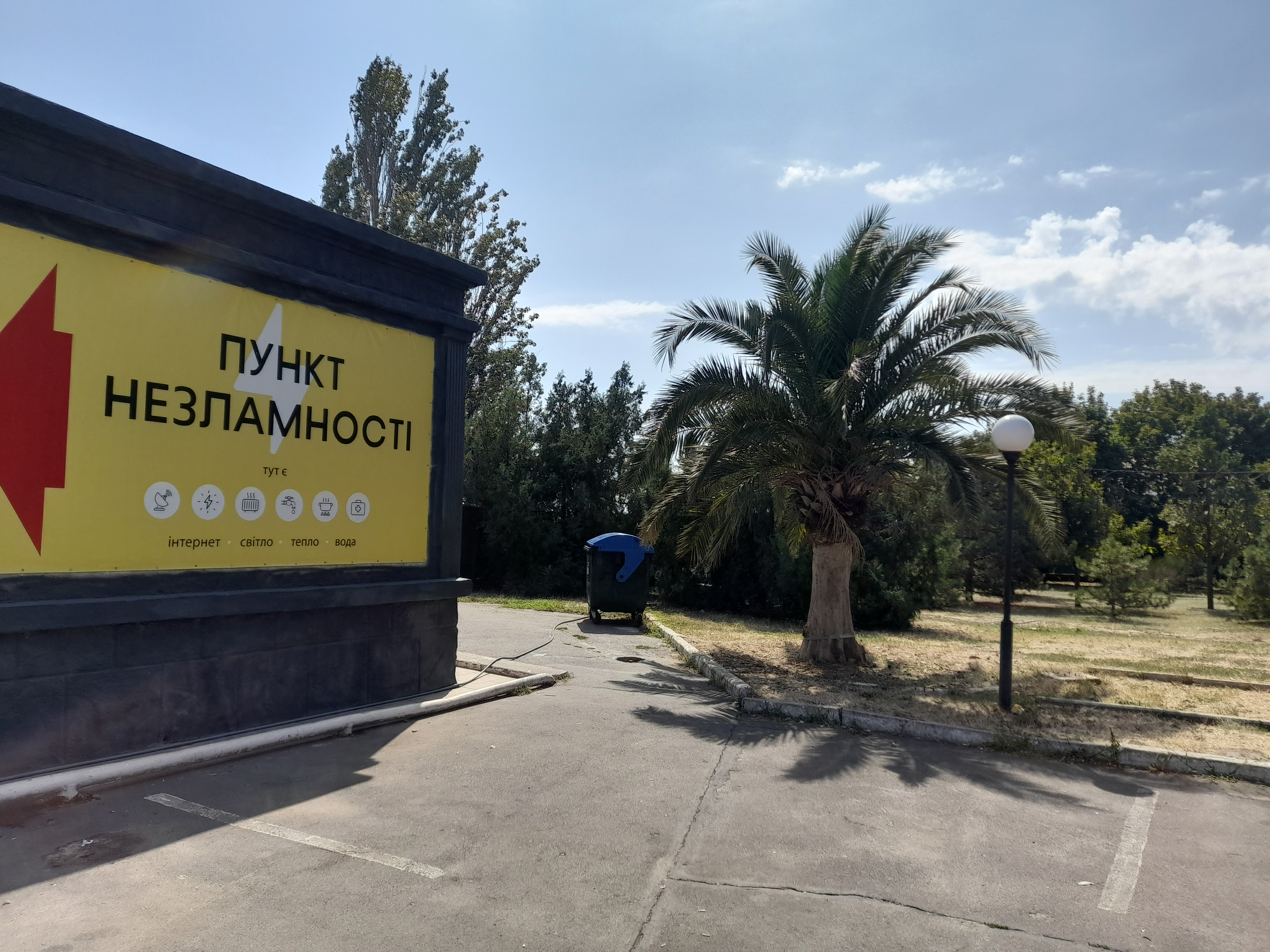
Points of Invincibility

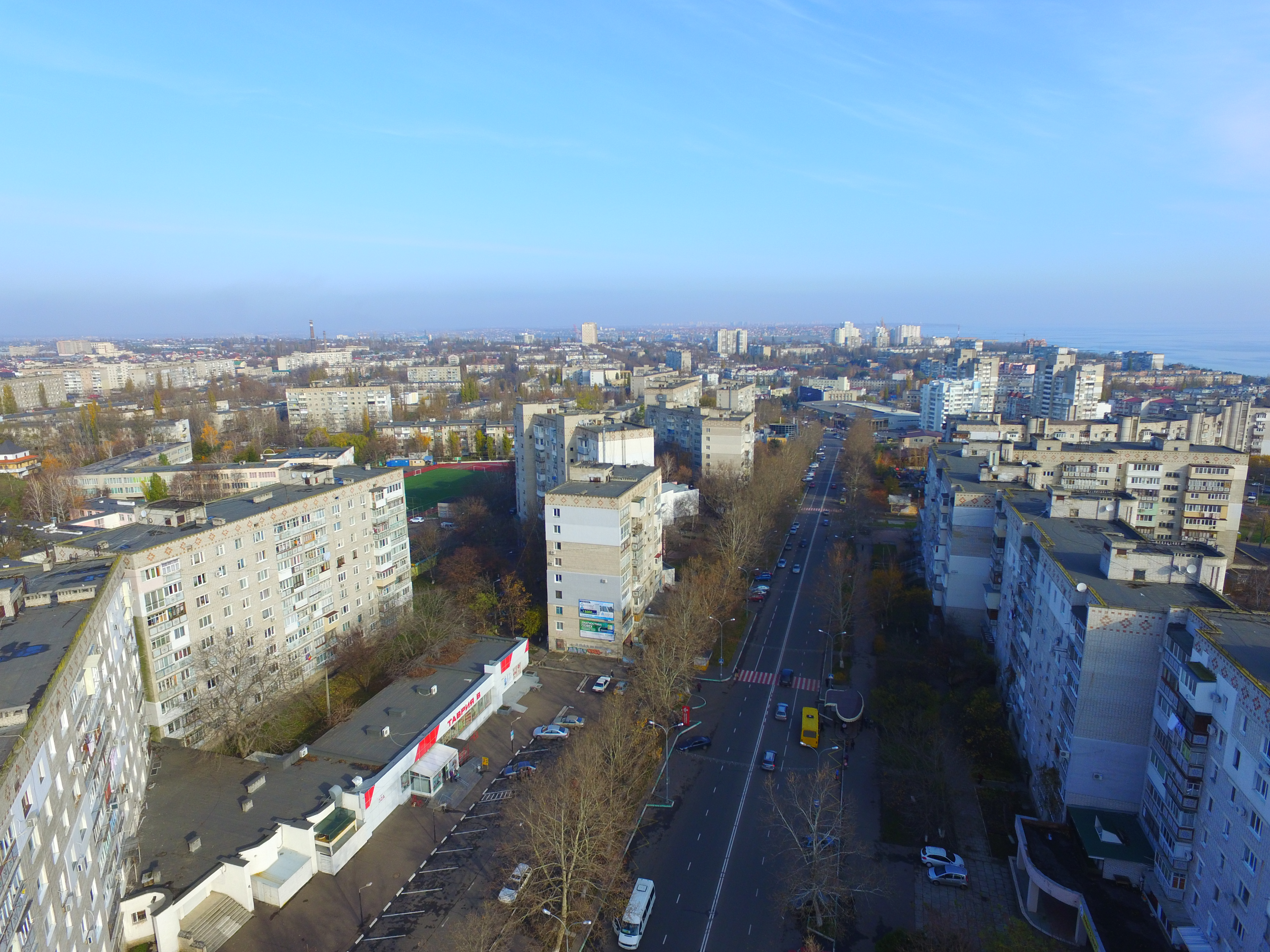
Myru Avenue

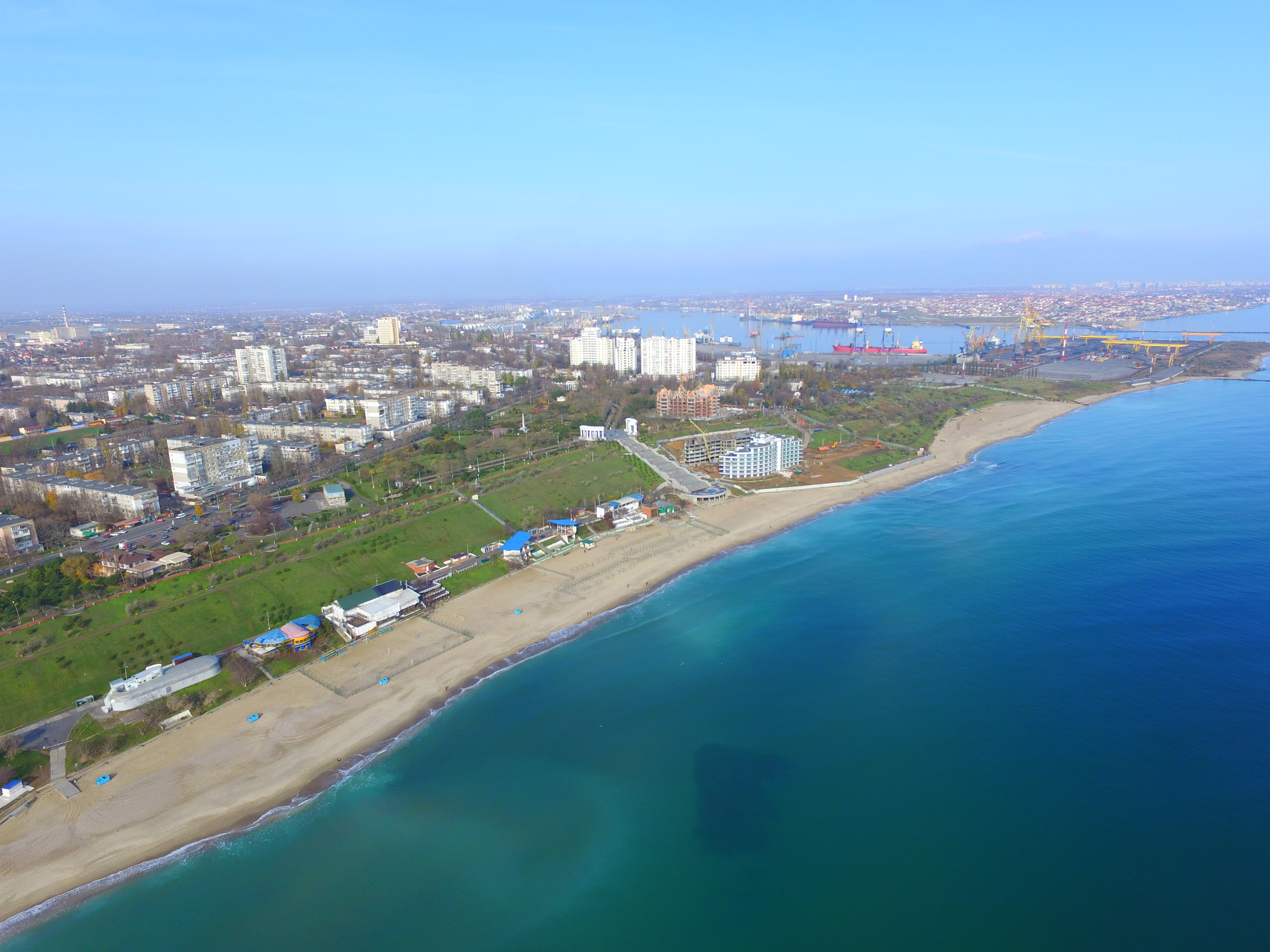
Aerial view of Chornomorsk

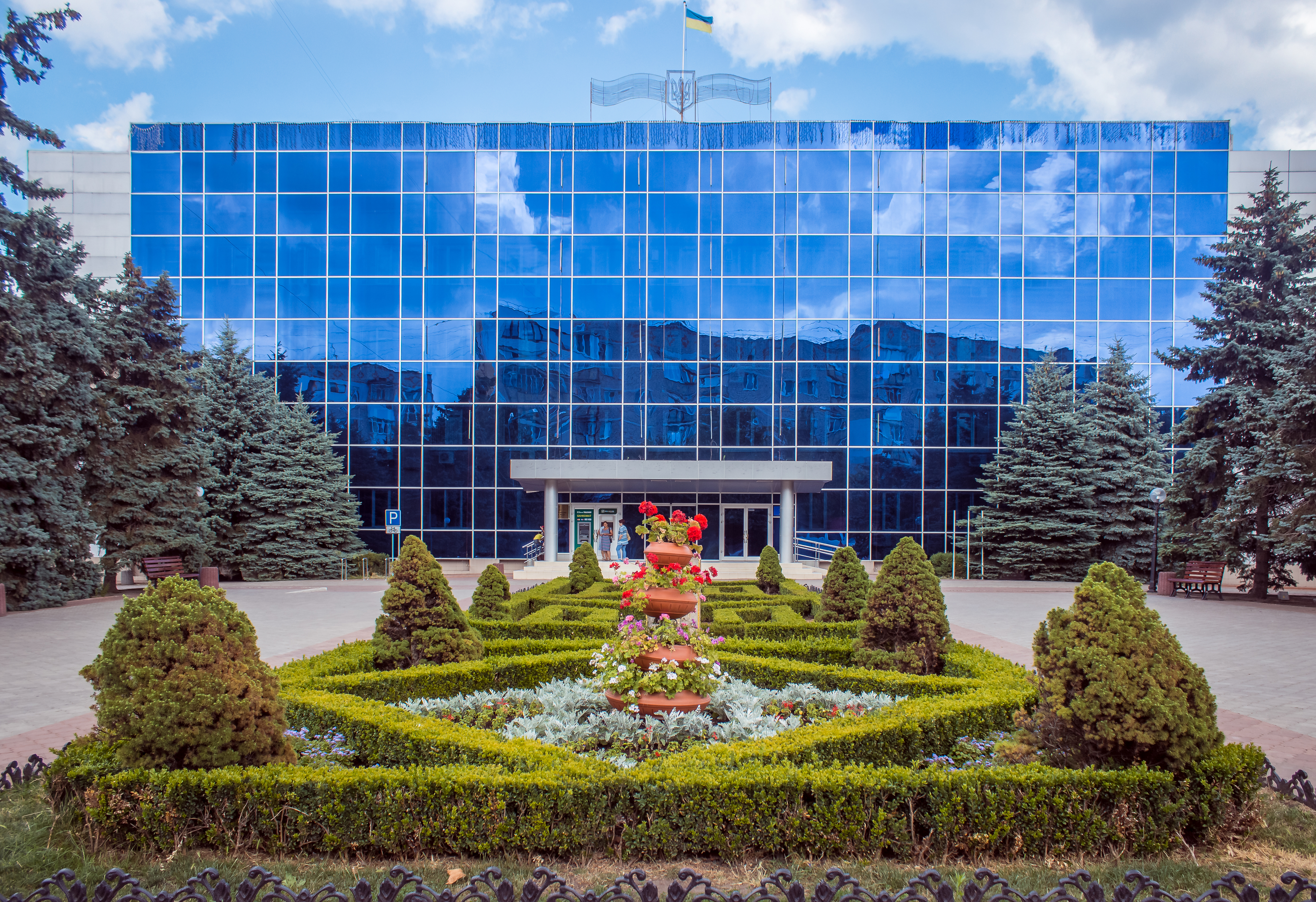
Chornomorsk City Hall

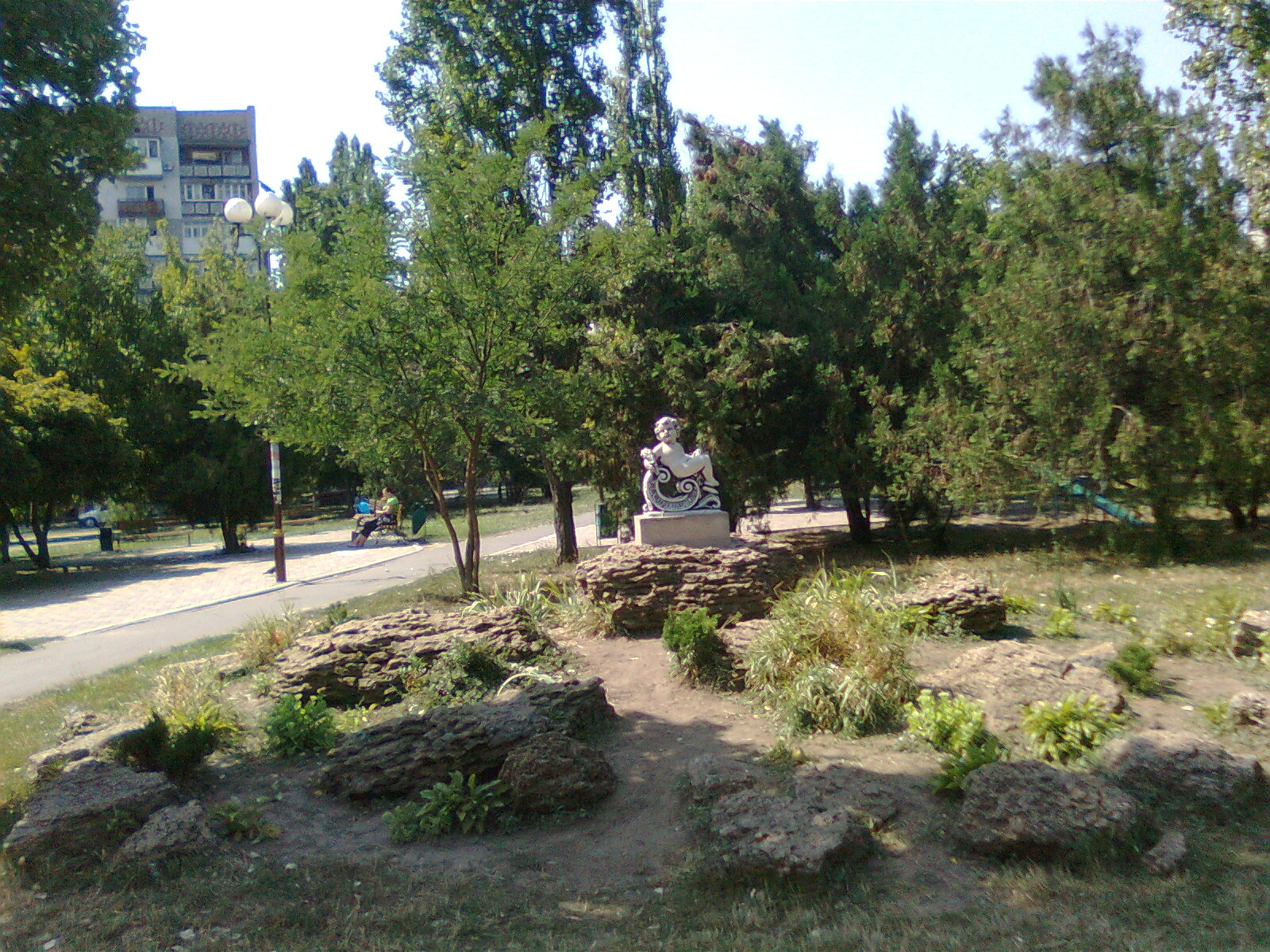
Molodizhni Park

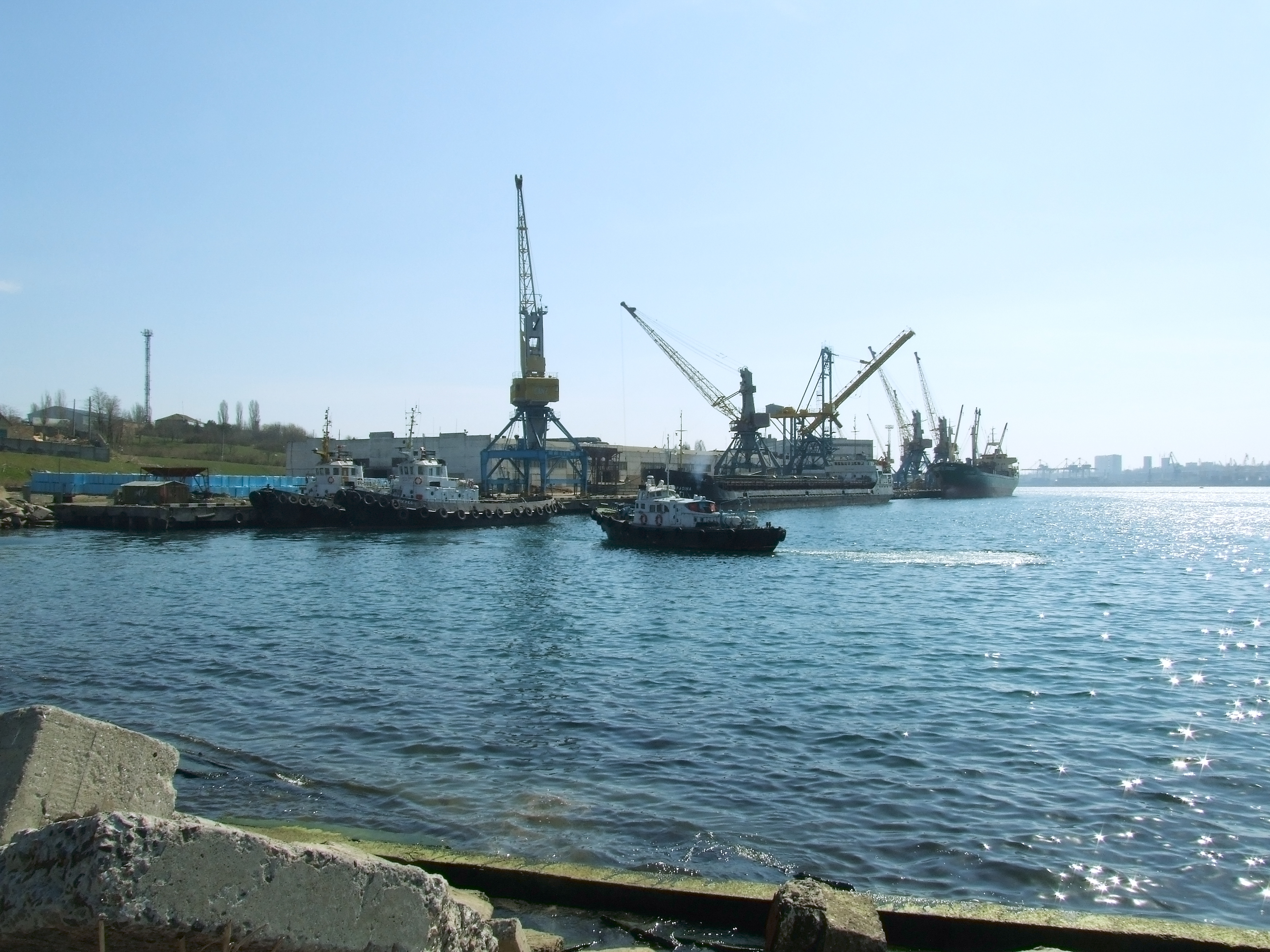
Chornomorsk Port
