= Ukrainian Sea Ports Authority =

State-owned entity for seaports

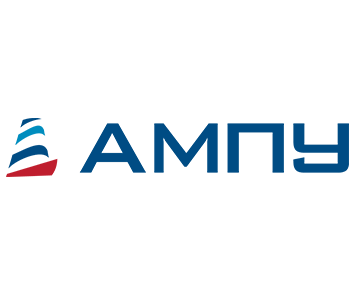
- Company type: state-owned enterprise
- Industry: Maritime transport
- Founded: 2013
- Headquarters: Kyiv, Ukraine
- Area served: Ukraine
- Key people: Oleksandr Holodnytskyi (Chairman)
- Products: berths maintenance, port services, pilotage
- Revenue: ▼ ₴7.02 billion (2019)
- Operating income: ▼ ₴1.99 billion (2019)
- Net income: ▼ ₴1.63 billion (2019)
- Total assets: ▼ ₴22.12 billion (2019)
- Number of employees: 7,302 (2019)
- Website: www.uspa.gov.ua

The Ukrainian Sea Ports Authority (abbr. USPA, Ukrainian: Адміністрація морських портів України, АМПУ, romanized: Administratsiia morskykh portiv Ukrainy, AMPU) is a state company created in 2013 after the adoption of the law "On Sea Ports of Ukraine" and united all ports of Ukraine under one administration. Total throughput of 13 seaports in 2019 exceeded 160 million tons.

The mission of USPA is to facilitate the development of Ukraine's maritime transport infrastructure and increase the competitiveness of Ukrainian sea ports in the Azov-Black Sea basin by means of creating necessary conditions for the economic activity of maritime terminals and enterprises whose main products and/or raw materials are subject to exports-imports transactions being handled in the sea ports as cargo. There are other tasks of the USPA such as maintenance of the passport depths of the ports’ water areas and approach channels, quay wall mainatance, and safety of navigation.

Currently the company has control over 13 port authorities on territory of Ukraine; five more ports in Crimea (ports of Kerch, Yalta, Sevastopol, Feodosia, and Yevpatoria) were closed by the Government of Ukraine due to the 2014 annexation of Crimea by the Russian Federation. Navigational and piloting services are provided by USPA branch Delta Lotsman. Though, navigational equipment (i.e. lighthouses, leading lights, etc.) is serviced by separate entity Derzhhidrohrafiya which also provides information about territorial waters of Ukraine. Stevedoring and handling services are provided by both 13 state and around 90 private port operators.

In general, there are 13 seaports located on the continental part of Ukraine in the Black Sea and Azov basins, as well as the Danube Delta: Reni, Izmail, Ust-Dunaisk, Bilhorod-Dnistrovskyi, Chornomorsk, Odesa, Pivdennyi, Mykolaiv, Olvia, Kherson, Skadovsk, Berdiansk, Mariupol, the total capacity of which is around 260 million tons per year. The length of the berthing front of the seaports is about 43 km (27 mi), and the length of the channels (Kherson sea channel, Buh-Dnipro-Lyman channel (BDLC) and Deepwater Navigation Course (DNC) "Danube – Black Sea runs through distributary "Bystre") reach 124,768 km (77,527 mi) (40 km, 81,368 km and 3,4 km respectively). Even though port authorities practice "landlord-port" management model by providing public services to state and private stevedores and shipping lines, land management is actually executed by relevant regional or municipal authorities.

Today, the largest Ukrainian seaports are Pivdennyi, Odesa, Mykolaiv and Chornomorsk, which account for about 80% of the total throughput of Ukrainian seaports. The key advantages of these seaports are the availability of deep-water approaches that enable the service of large-capacity marine vessels, including the involvement of private entities in providing handling services. Other seaports of Ukraine can accept vessels with a lower draft, and servicing of cargo flows in which, in vast majority, is provided by stevedoring companies of state ownership.

A number of ferry lines also operates in Ukraine, sea container lines connecting Ukraine with the ports of the Black Sea basin, and is an integral part of the international transport corridors: TRACECA, New Silk Road, Pan-European No. 9 and others. Major multimodal port is Chornomorsk with its ferry-railway multimodal terminal with services to Port, Batumi, Varna, and number of Turkish ports.

The servicing of container lines is currently provided by container terminals located in the ports of Odesa (HHLA CTO, Brooklyn-Kyiv Port), Chornomorsk (Fish port and State Stevedoring Company Chornomorsk) and Pivdennyi (TIS-Container terminal) with their total capacity of 3 130 thousand TEU per year. The indicated volume will be increased in the nearest future by 600 thousand TEU due to the newly created capacities of the container terminal at the Quarantine Mole of the Port of Odesa.

Servicing of passenger and cruise vessels on international and domestic lines is carried out by passenger terminals in the ports of Reni, Izmail and Ust-Dunaisk (with a port point in Vylkove city), as well as a passenger complex in Port of Odesa.

Starting 2018, USPA was assigned a function to maintain navigation characteristics on inland waterways, namely on Dnipro, Pripyat', and other rivers by executing number of activities, including dredging. For that purpose, USPA new branch "Dredging Fleet" was established.

International cooperation

In 2018 Ukrainian Sea Ports Authority joined European Sea Ports Organisation (ESPO) as an observer member, in 2019 - European Federation of Inland Ports (EFIP). Since 2017 USPA has established partnership agreement with EBRD on preparation of two pilot concession projects in the ports of Kherson and Olvia. In 2019 USPA signed a MoU with Port of Antwerp International.

== Entities (branches) governed ==
- Delta Lotsman
- Dredging Fleet
- Port of Berdiansk Authority
  - Henichensk Sea Trade Port (reorganized into a transit port of Berdyansk MTP)
- Port of Mariupol Authority
- Port of Chornomorsk Authority (formerly Illichivsk)
- Port of Odesa Authority
- Port of Bilhorod-Dnistrovskyi Authority
- Port of Pivdennyi Authority
- Port of Skadovsk Authority
- Port of Mykolaiv Authority
- Port of Kherson Authority
- Specialized Sea Port Olvia Authority
- Port of Izmail Authority
- Port of Ust-Dunaisk Authority
- Port of Reni Authority

== Management ==
- Raivis Veckagans, Acting CEO (2017 - 2020)
- Olexander Holodnytsky, Acting CEO (2020 - until now)

=== Supervisory Board ===
- Dmytro Barinov, Head of the Supervisory Board, representative of the State (until August 2019)
- Patrick Julia H. Verhoeven, Deputy Head of the Supervisory Board (since April 2019)
- Yulia Klymenko, Independent Member of the Supervisory Board (until August 2019)
- Wolfgang Hurtienne, Independent Member of the Supervisory Board (since April 2019)
- Jan van Schoonhoven, Independent Member of the Supervisory Board (since April 2019)
- Anton Yashchenko, Member of the Supervisory Board, representative of the State (since April 2019)
- Taras Trotskyi, Member of the Supervisory Board, representative of the State (until August 2019)
- Andrii Haidutskyi, Member of the Supervisory Board, representative of the State (since January 2020)
- Dmytro Honcharuk, Member of the Supervisory Board, representative of the State (since January 2020)

== Closed ports due to Russian occupation ==
- Port of Yevpatoriya
- Port of Kerch
- Port of Sevastopol
- Port of Feodosiya
- Donuzlav Sea Tade Port (liquidation)
- Port of Yalta

== Marine supporting agencies (not part of USPA) ==
Operators

- State Ship Company "Ukrainian Commerce Fleet"
- State Ship Company "Kerch Ferry" (Kerch Strait ferry line)
- OJSC Ship Company "Sea Trident"
- OJSC "Ukrainian Danube Steamship"
- State Ship Company "Black Sea Shipping Company"
- State Ship Company "Ukrtanker"
- State Ship Company "Ukrainian Sea Refrigeration Transportation" (liquidation)

Regional Logistics and Support

- Fleet administration
  - Feodosia State Trade Company "Torhmortrans"
  - Black Sea Yacht Club
  - Black Sea Main Sea Agency "Inflot"
  - State Company "Ukrtekhflot"
- Inspections and records
  - Human resources
    - State Organization "Inspection in preparation and certification of sailors"
    - Ukrainian State Company in hiring of workers of sea and river transportation "Ukrcrewing"
  - Ship registry
    - Classification Association Ship Registry of Ukraine
    - Inspection of the Main State Fleet Registry
  - Research and analytics
    - Information-Analytic Center of Sea and River Transportation
    - Science-Researching and Project-Constructive Institute of Sea Fleet of Ukraine with Research Production
    - State Project-Searching and Science-Researching Institute of Sea Transportation "Chornomorndiproekt"
- Security and Navigation
  - Agency of Sea Security
  - State Institution "Derzhhidrohrafiya"
  - Sea Accident-Rescue Service
  - State Coordination Center in Search and Rescue at Sea
  - BlackSea-Azov Production-Exploiting Directory of Sea Routes
  - State Company of Sea Telecommunications of Ukraine "Morkom"
  - State Company of Waterways "Ukrvodshlyakh"
  - State Company of Waterways "Ustdunaivodshlyakh"
  - Main State Inspection of Ukraine of Ship Security (liquidation temporarily suspended)
- Ship factories
  - Kerch Ship-Maintenance Factory
  - Ship-Maintenance Production of the Illichivsk Ship-Maintenance Factory (liquidation)
  - State Production Union "Illichivsk Ship-Maintenance Factory"
  - State Company "Ukrspetsobladnannya"
- Administration of River Ports

== See also ==
- List of ports in Ukraine
- Transport in Ukraine
