= SS Admiral Nakhimov =

Soviet passenger ship which sank near the port of Novorossiysk, Russia in 1986

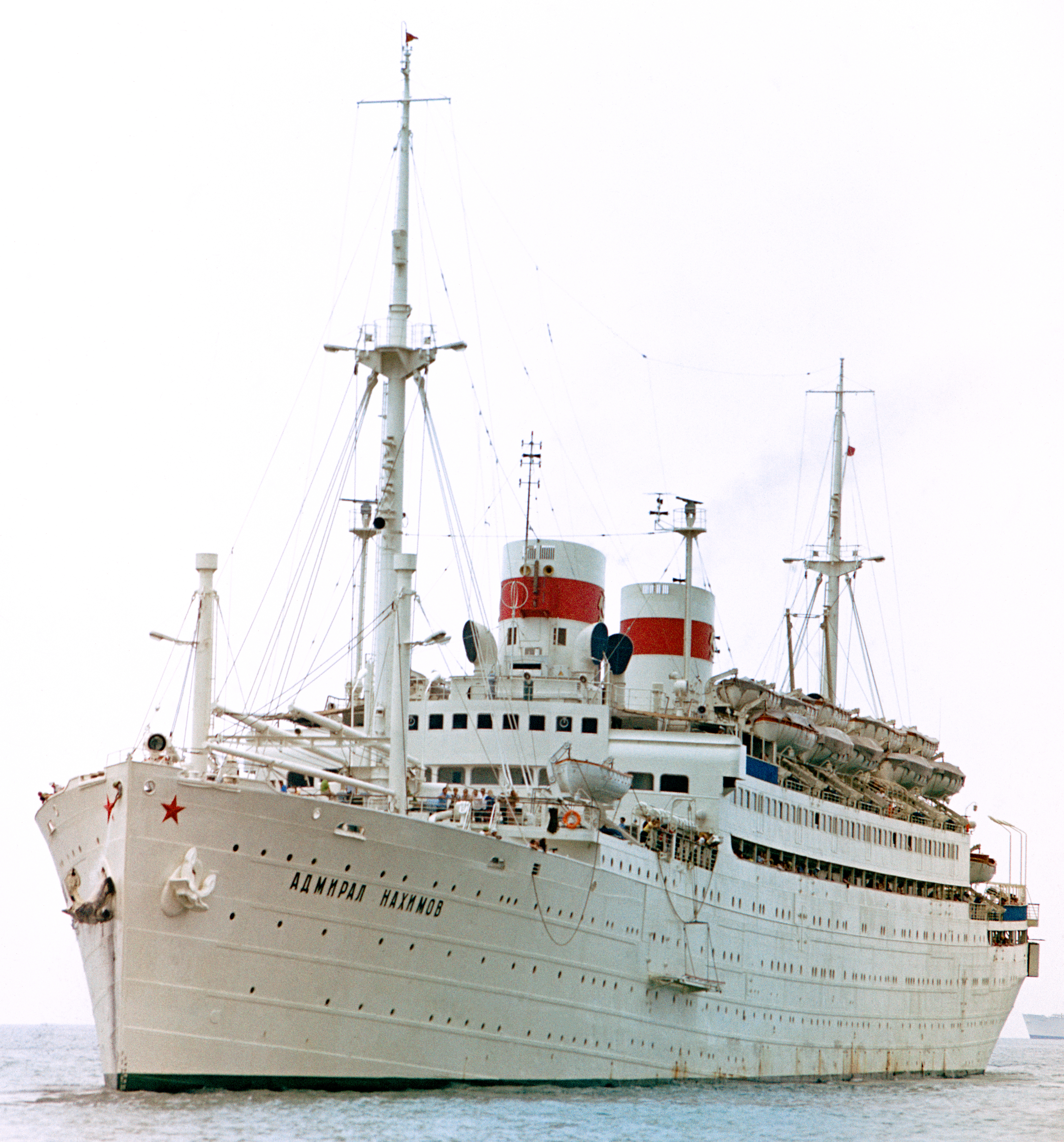
- Admiral Nakhimov in 1975

History

→ Germany
- Name: SS Berlin
- Namesake: City of Berlin, Germany
- Operator: (Weimar Republic) → (Nazi Germany) Norddeutscher Lloyd
- Builder: Bremer Vulkan
- Launched: 24 March 1925
- In service: 17 September 1925
- Out of service: 16 July 1939
- Reclassified: Workers' cruise ship, 1939
- Home port: Bremen, Germany
- Identification: Call sign QMBT → DOCL
- Fate: Converted to a hospital ship after 16 July 1939; Commissioned by the Kriegsmarine, 23 August 1939

Germany
- Name: SS Lazarettschiff A
- Operator: Kriegsmarine
- Commissioned: 23 August 1939
- Reclassified: Hospital ship
- Stricken: 31 January 1945
- Fate: Struck a mine and sank near Swinemünde; Salvaged by the Soviet Union, 17 September 1947

Soviet Union
- Name: SS Admiral Nakhimov
- Namesake: Admiral Pavel Nakhimov
- Operator: (Soviet Union) Black Sea Shipping Company
- In service: 1957
- Reclassified: Passenger liner
- Stricken: 31 August 1986
- Home port: Odessa, Ukrainian SSR
- Identification: Call sign UKDD; IMO number: 5002986
- Fate: Sank after colliding with the Soviet bulk carrier Pyotr Vasyov

General characteristics
- Type: Passenger liner
- Tonnage: 15,286 GRT (originally); 17,053 GRT (after conversion)
- Length: 174.3 m (571 ft 10 in)
- Beam: 21.02 m (69 ft 0 in)
- Speed: 16 knots (30 km/h; 18 mph)
- Capacity: 1,101 + 24 extra passengers: 323 first-class; 290-second-class; 488 third-class;
- Crew: 313 + 41 extra crew

SS Admiral Nakhimov (Russian: Адмирал Нахимов), launched in March 1925 and originally named SS Berlin, was a passenger liner of the German Weimar Republic later converted to a Kriegsmarine hospital ship, then a Soviet passenger ship. On 31 August 1986, Admiral Nakhimov collided with the Soviet large bulk carrier Pyotr Vasyov (Russian: Пётр Васёв) in the Tsemes Bay, near the Port of Novorossiysk, Russian SFSR, and quickly sank. In total, 423 of the 1,234 people on board died.

== History ==
=== Berlin ===
==== Pre-war service ====
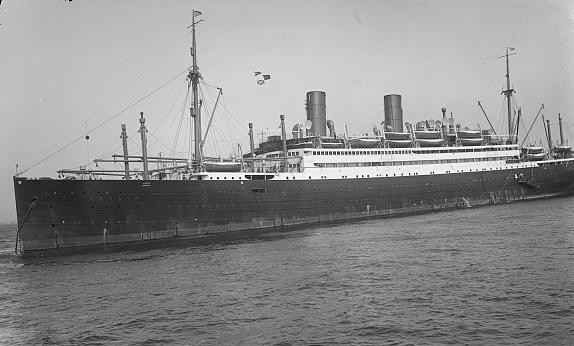
The Berlin in her North German Lloyd colours

Berlin was built by Bremer Vulkan at Vegesack, Germany (Yard 614) and was completed in March 1925. She was launched on 25 March 1925, and commissioned on 17 September 1925. The ship was 174.3 metres (571 ft 10 in) long, had four decks and a volume of 15,286 GRT. She originally operated the Bremen – Southampton – Cherbourg – New York City run for the North German Lloyd Line.

The ship's main route was between Bremerhaven, Southampton and New York, which she began on 26 September 1925 and operated until May 1939 when she was laid up in Bremerhaven for refitting. On 12 November 1928, Berlin rescued the passengers and crew of the liner Vestris, which sank off the coast of Virginia en route from New York City to Barbados. 108 people died in the sinking.

Berlin was chartered by the Strength Through Joy (Kraft durch Freude, KdF) program of the Nazi Party in 1939, for use as a workers' vacation ship, and was later used as a hospital ship during World War II.

==== World War II ====
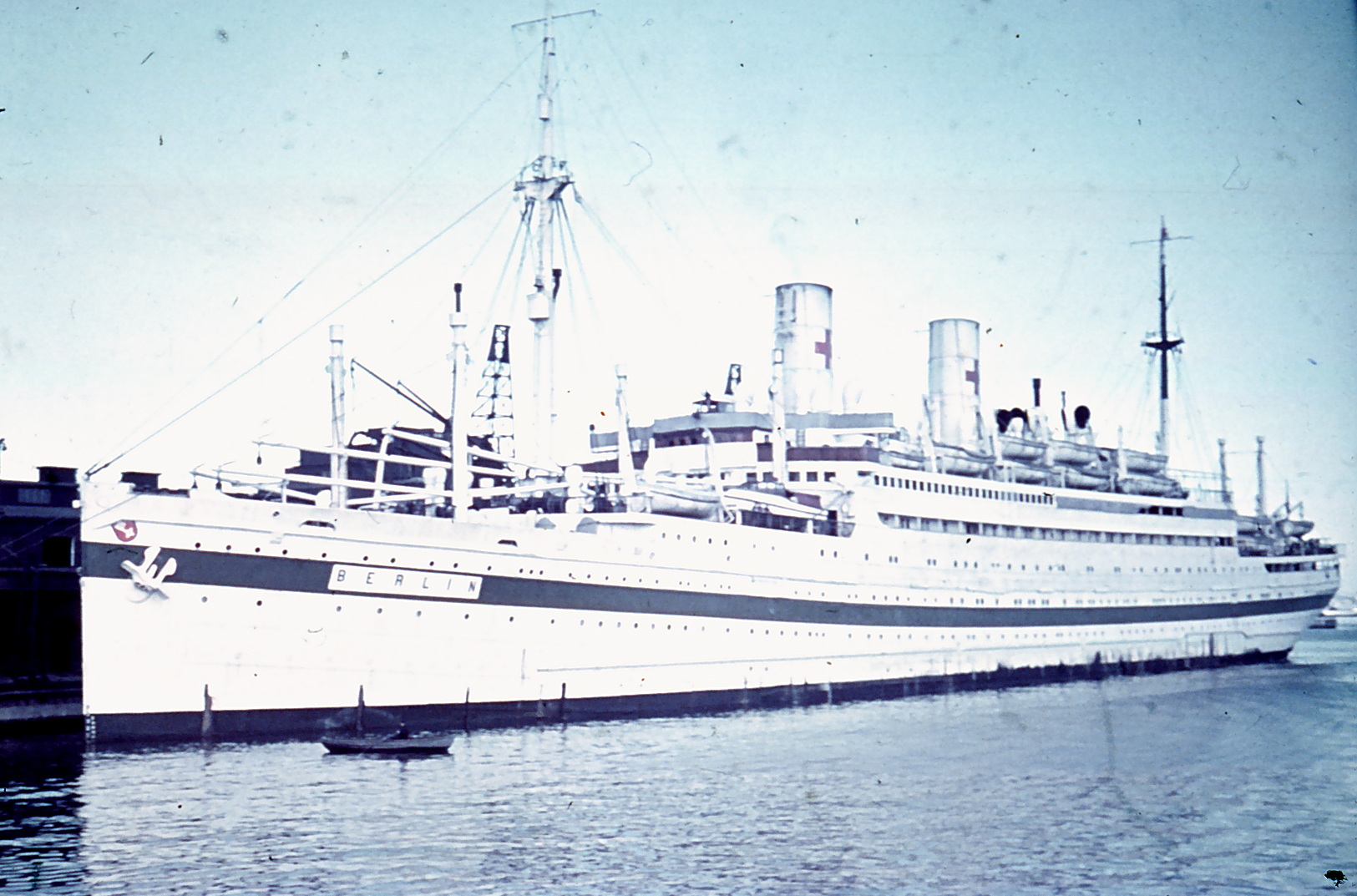
SS Berlin at Langelinie, between 1940 and 1942

Berlin was one of eight German ships commissioned as hospital ships (Lazarettschiffe) during World War II. Most, if not all, of these ships also served in other capacities during the war after being decommissioned as hospital ships, mainly as accommodation or transport ships for military personnel. All German hospital ships were given alphabetic identifiers, Berlin's being A. On 16 July 1939, Berlin began her conversion to a hospital ship and commissioned into service with the Kriegsmarine as Lazarettschiff A, Sanitätsamt Ost on 23 August 1939. The ship had berthing for 400 patients, with a crew of 165. Initially serving in Norwegian waters, she was identified as "Field Post Number 07520". By January 1945, Berlin was assigned to Operation Hannibal, the transport of refugees and soldiers from the Eastern Baltic. On 31 January 1945, while forming up in convoy to head east, Berlin struck a mine off Swinemünde, and was put in tow for Kiel.

She then hit another mine and was beached (23:53 hr, at position 54°03′N 14°19′E, in shallow waters). There was one fatality. All usable equipment was salvaged by 5 February 1945, and the ship was abandoned.

=== Admiral Nakhimov ===
According to the reparations, Berlin went to the Soviet Union. In 1946, work began on its lifting by the Emergency Rescue Service of the Baltic Fleet. In a short time, all compartments were sealed under water and pumping of water was started. However, the liner was mined by the Germans, and when during the ascent on New Year's Eve 1947, its bow appeared above the surface of the water, a strong explosion occurred.

The ship sank for the second time, pressing down the diver Timofey Starchenko, who went down under its bottom to plug a leak in one of the aft compartments. The diver was pressed into the mud, but he was saved by a hard copper helmet. Thanks to the quickly performed unique rescue operation, the diver managed to pull out alive through a tunnel specially made under the bottom of the steamer. On the second attempt, the ship was lifted and sent for major repairs. The ship was renamed Admiral Nakhimov in honor of Admiral Pavel Nakhimov, a 19th-century Russian naval commander who played a prominent role in the Crimean War. After her conversion, her size was increased to 17,053 GRT. She entered passenger service for the Black Sea Steamship Company in 1957. In 1962, during the Cuban Missile Crisis, the ship was used to transport soldiers to Cuba.

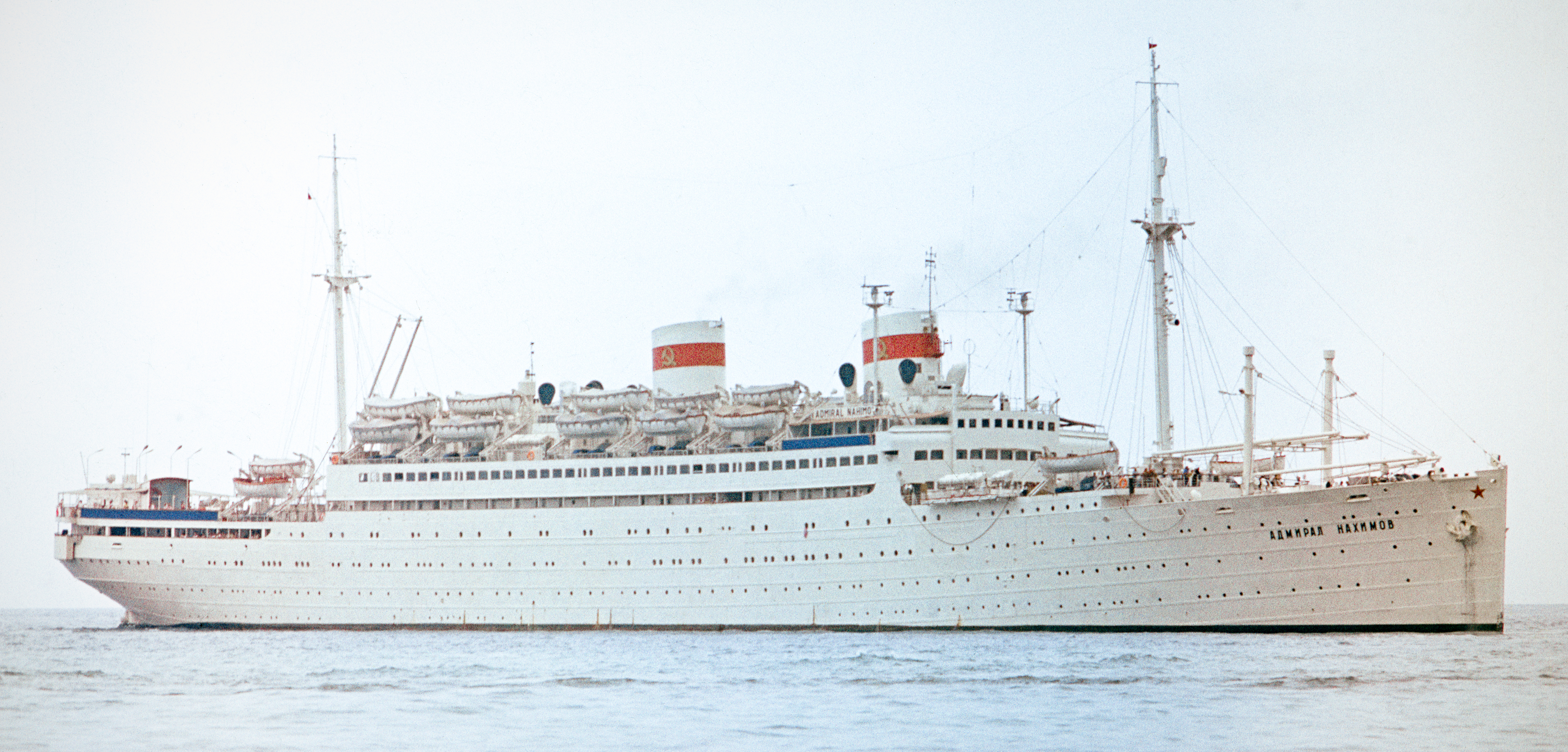
Admiral Nakhimov in 1975

During the peak summer travel season, Admiral Nakhimov operated cruises on the Black Sea between Odessa and Batumi, a six-day round trip. She carried an average of 1,000 people per voyage. She was the flagship of the Black Sea passenger fleet for several years until more modern liners entered service.

==== Sinking ====
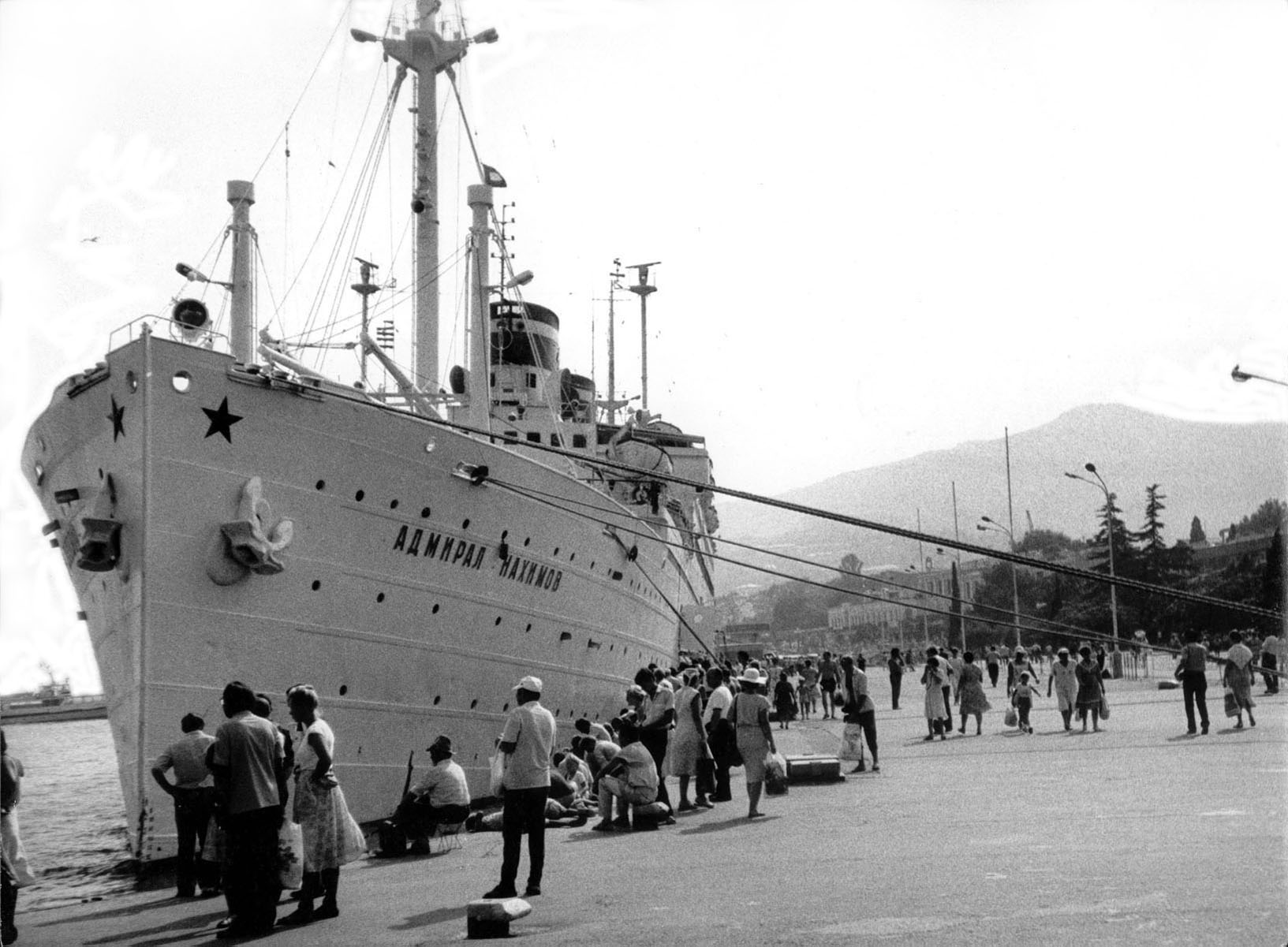
The passenger liner Admiral Nakhimov at the pier in the Port of Yalta a day before the disaster, 30 August 1986

At 10:00 p.m. Moscow Time on 31 August 1986, Admiral Nakhimov sailed from Novorossiysk en route to Sochi, its next stop. There were 888 passengers and 346 crew members aboard. Most of the passengers were Ukrainians, with the remainder from the Russian SFSR, the Moldavian SSR, and other parts of the then Soviet Union. The captain of the ship was Vadim Markov.

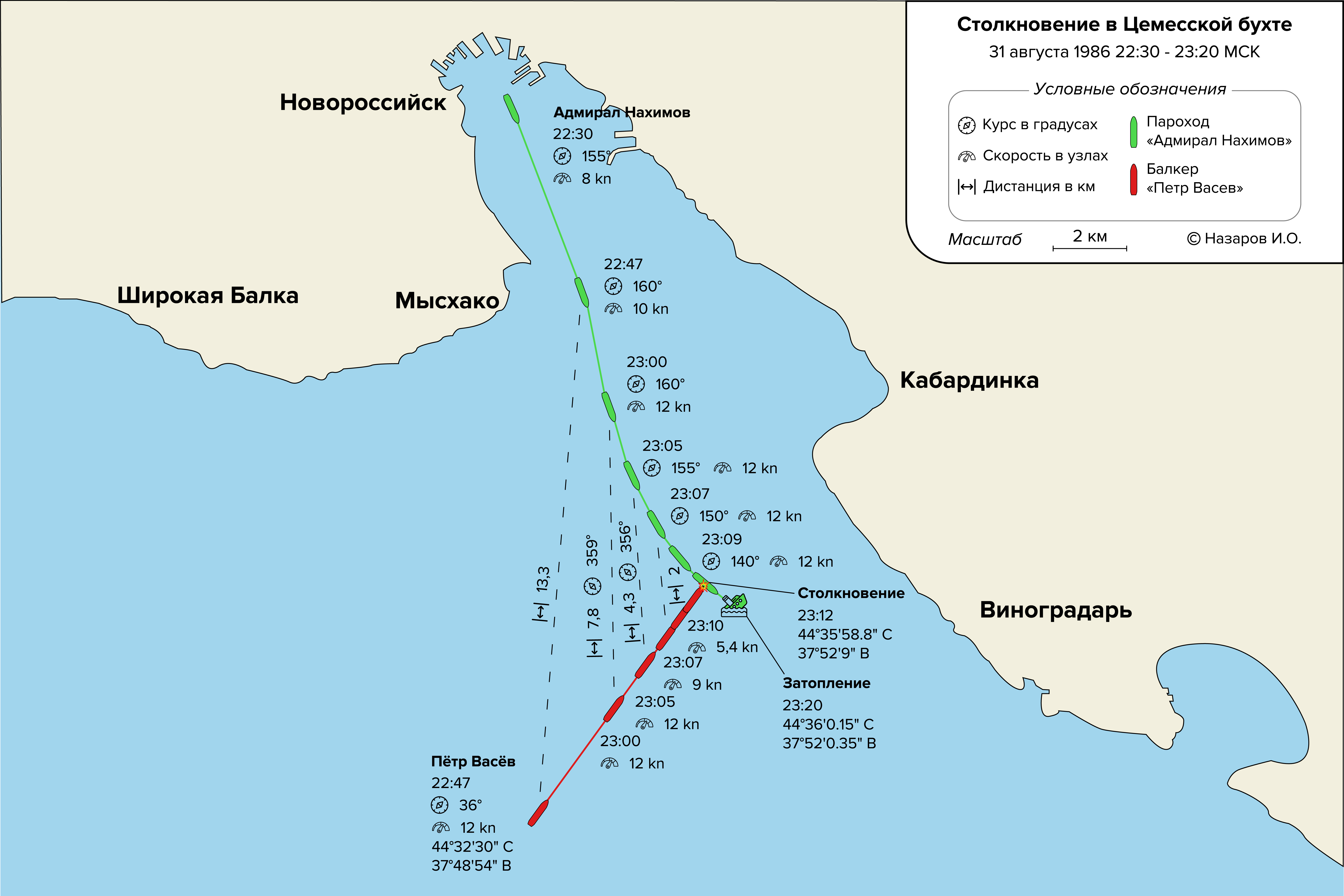
Map of ship movement in the Tsemess Bay on August 31, 1986

Just minutes into the voyage, the ship's pilot noticed that the large bulk carrier Pyotr Vasyov was on a collision course with Admiral Nakhimov. Pyotr Vasyov was a Japanese-built, 18,604-gross register ton (GRT) freighter recently acquired by the Soviet Union, and was carrying a cargo of barley and oats from Baie-Comeau, Canada. The pilot radioed a warning to Pyotr Vasyov, and the freighter responded, "Don't worry. We will pass clear of each other. We will take care of everything."

Despite the message, Captain Viktor Tkachenko of Pyotr Vasyov did nothing to slow his ship or change course. Convinced that the freighter would pass without incident, Captain Markov of Admiral Nakhimov retired to his cabin leaving his second mate Alexander Chudnovsky in charge. From 11:00 p.m., Chudnovsky radioed Pyotr Vasyov several times, asking about her course and her further actions. Chudnovsky changed the ship's course 10 degrees portside. At 11:10 p.m., Chudnovsky cried on VHF to the freighter, "Immediately reverse full astern!" When it was clear that the freighter was headed directly for the ship, Pyotr Vasyov's engines were thrown in reverse. Admiral Nakhimov turned hard to port, but it was too late.

At 11:12 p.m., Admiral Nakhimov was struck by Pyotr Vasyov 8 nautical miles (15 km; 9.2 mi) from the Port of Novorossiysk and 2 nautical miles (3.7 km; 2.3 mi) from shore, at 44°36′15″N 37°52′35″E. While many passengers had gone to bed by this time, some were on deck listening and dancing to music. They could only watch helplessly as the freighter rammed into the starboard side of the ship at a speed of about 5 knots (9.3 km/h; 5.8 mph). Admiral Nakhimov continued forward with the freighter's bow in its side, ripping a 900-square-foot (84 m^{2}) hole in the hull between the engine and boiler rooms.

Admiral Nakhimov immediately took on a list on her starboard side, and her lights went out upon impact. After a few seconds, the emergency diesel generator powered on, but the lights went out again two minutes later, plunging the sinking ship into darkness. People below decks found themselves lost in the dark and some struggled to find their way through the hallways, troubled by the ever increasing list of the ship. Without power, the system that remotely closed the watertight bulkheads' doors failed (although, due to the flooding of two compartments, a ship with the current design would still not be able to stay afloat).

There was no time to launch the lifeboats. This was exacerbated by the fact that a rapidly formed strong list prevented this, quickly exceeding the design allowable 20 degrees; in addition, according to some of the witnesses, the lifeboats and davits were painted on the spot (and old davits were destroyed by corrosion), which made launching at least some of them impossible. (Similar cases were noted earlier in some other shipwrecks, such as the PS General Slocum or TSMS Lakonia cases.) From the forecastle on the port side, it was possible to lower one lifeboat, but by that time there was no longer the power needed for the winches to lower it into the water. Only later, when the ship was sinking, the lifeboat was able to sail. As a result, life rafts had to be thrown from the ship into the water, out of 48 they managed to drop 32. Hundreds of people dived into the oily water, clinging to lifejackets, barrels and pieces of debris.

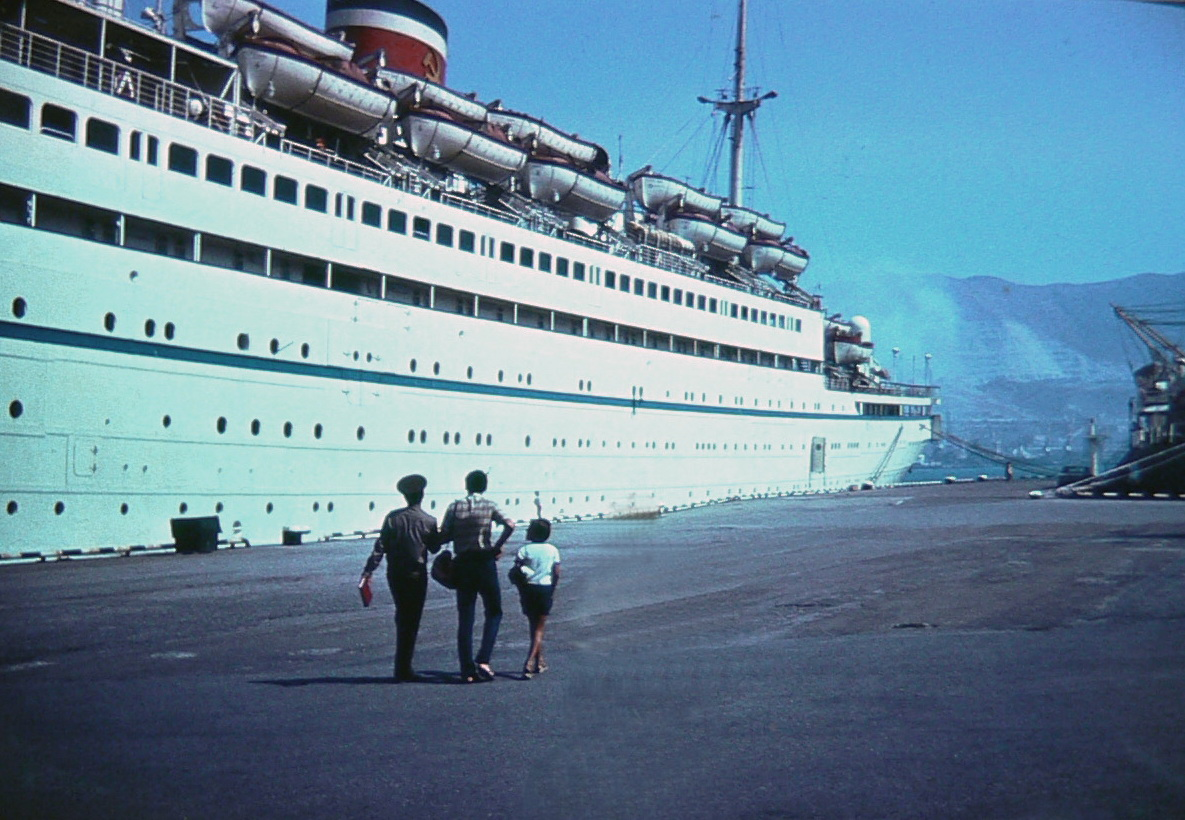
Admiral Nakhimov docked in Novorossiysk, August 31, 1986; she would sink that evening

A mere seven minutes after the collision, Admiral Nakhimov rolled onto her beam ends and sank stern-first. Rescue ships began arriving 10 minutes later. Pyotr Vasyov was not badly damaged, and assisted in the rescue effort. Sixty-four rescue ships and 20 helicopters rushed to the scene, and 836 people were pulled from the water. Some people were so slick with fuel oil that they could not keep hold of the hands of their rescuers. Sailors had to jump into the water to save people.

Admiral Nakhimov lacked proper ventilation, which was the reason all 90 windows in the cabins were open during the accident. The several bulkheads that would have prevented the ship from sinking were removed during the conversion. The Admiral Nakhimov after that was able to float with only one compartment flooded, while most other ships could float with at least two filled with water. The wreck of Admiral Nakhimov lies on its starboard side in 150 feet (46 m) of water in Tsemes Bay off Novorossiysk.

Pyotr Vasyov was renamed and operated under other flags until 2012.

==== Victims ====
Passengers and crew had little time to escape, and 423 of the 1,234 on board perished. Sixty-four of those killed were crew members and 359 were passengers. The event was not reported in the news for forty-eight hours. The survivors were only allowed to send telegrams saying "Alive and well in Novorossiysk."

===== Search for the drowned =====
On September 1, 1986, at 2:25 p.m., the Ametist rescue vessel's sonar detected an underwater obstacle. At 7:38 p.m., a civilian diver was lowered from the diving boat onto the sunken vessel, and he reported seeing Admiral Nakhimov, which was lying with a severe list to starboard. To help the divers of the Black Sea Shipping Company, the Soviet large specialized rescue ship SS-21 arrived at the scene of the Admiral Nakhimov tragedy after 10 hours, which, after a months-long campaign, had just returned to Sevastopol from the Mediterranean Sea. The reconnaissance divers of the 17th Special Forces Brigade of the Black Sea Fleet were also urgently involved in the rescue work. Military divers immediately joined the work on the inspection of the sunken liner. It was extremely difficult to search underwater on an overturned vessel.

For greater safety, the divers inside the ship worked in pairs, and on the upper decks used balloon breathing apparatus with an autonomous supply of oxygen-nitrogen mixture. The oak doors of the Nakhimov's interiors were heavily swollen from the water, as a result, they often had to be blown open with underwater explosive charges. Working at night on board the sunken liner, having spent a lot of time and effort installing explosives, and then also on the way back through the maze of corridors, divers Lieutenant Commander Igor Ivlev and Midshipman Yuri Vladimirovich Polishchuk used up almost the entire supply of breathing mixture. Helping a friend, Polishchuk himself lost consciousness from lack of air, as a result of which, when climbing to the surface, he fell out of the diving gazebo again to the bottom. At great risk, working almost without decompression, other divers managed to find Polishchuk, quickly lift him onto the ship and place him in a pressure chamber. Doctors fought for a long time, but they could not save him. On September 10, 1986, Polishchuk, commander of a platoon of reconnaissance divers of the Black Sea Fleet Special Forces brigade, died without regaining consciousness.

After this incident, it became more common (especially when working on the lower decks) to use diving equipment with the traditional supply of a breathing mixture through a hose from the ship providing descent. On September 19, 1986, midshipman Sergei Alexandrovich Shardakov was given the task to get into the 41st cabin, in which, according to eyewitnesses, children remained locked. Trying to open the door with a crowbar, he got tangled in his own cables and hoses, could not ventilate the suit in time and lost consciousness. His partner managed to pull the unconscious midshipman out of the corridor, but he died before the arrival of help from the surface. After the death of the second diver, as well as due to the completion of the survey of most of the premises, the production of underwater work on the sunken liner was stopped by the decision of the Government Commission, before all cabins had been entered.

==== Investigation ====
The Soviet government formed a commission of inquiry to investigate the disaster. It determined that both Captain Markov of Admiral Nakhimov and Captain Tkachenko of Pyotr Vasyov had violated navigational safety rules. Despite repeated orders to let Admiral Nakhimov pass, Tkachenko refused to slow his ship and only reported the accident 40 minutes after it occurred. Captain Markov was absent from the bridge. The inquiry took place in 1987 in Odessa. In March 1987, the captains of both vessels: Vadim Georgievich Markov, captain of the Admiral Nakhimov, and Viktor Ivanovich Tkachenko, captain of the Pyotr Vasyov, were found equally guilty of shipwreck, loss of life and sentenced to 15 years in prison each. Both captains were released early in the fall of 1992. After his release, V.G. Markov worked as a captain-mentor in the Black Sea Shipping Company and lived in the city of Odessa (where he died in 2007). V.I. Tkachenko immediately after his release went abroad, and under circumstances that were not fully clarified, he died in September 2003 when a yacht crashed near the coast of Canada.

== See also ==
- List of peacetime ship disasters by death toll
- List of ships with the name Admiral Nakhimov

== Bibliography ==
- McLaughlin, Stephen (2007). "Question 37/04: Soviet Guided Missile Cruiser Admiral Nakhimov". Warship International. XLIV (4): 334–338. ISSN 0043-0374.
