= Skif-Shipping =

Metinvest Holding Ltd. subsidiary

Metinvest Shipping (Ukrainian: Метінвест-Шиппінг), also known as Skif Shipping (Ukrainian: Скіф шиппінг) until 25 July 2012, is a Ukrainian transport company founded in 2000. As of 12 August 2006, Skif Shipping Ltd. is a subsidiary of Metinvest Holding Ltd. The company has branch offices in the cities of Mariupol, Sevastopol, Dnipro and Odesa. The company also employs people in Berdyansk, Chornomorsk, Izmail, Mykolaiv and Pivdenne.

== Company profile ==
The Company’s operations cover the whole range of cargo transportation services: from railway carriage to port operations: customs clearance, cargo expediting, freight quantity control, Laboratory Tests, ship's agency services, chartering of seaborne vessels. Skif-Shipping is the only company which has joint operations with Mariupol Merchant Seaport State Enterprise.

By 2011, Skif-Shipping was the largest freight expeditor in Ukraine, as it handled over 20 million tonnes of cargo annually. This was done primarily through the Port of Mariupol. After its rebranding, it continued to grow and by 2018 was expediting 25.37 million tonnes of cargo. That same year, it also purchased 1,800 open-top railcars to transport raw materials to help reduce the shortage of rolling stock and serviced 761 self-propelled vessels, which also made it the leading maritime agent in Ukraine. At the time, the cargo it transported accounted for approximately 22% of all freight dispatched on the network of Ukrzaliznytsia and around 19% of all cargo handled in ports in Ukraine. In 2019, at the 12th National Maritime Rating of Ukraine, the company won first place in both the Freight Forwarder of the Year and Maritime Agent of the Year for its 2018 results.

In March 2021, MetInvest entered into a 3-year lease agreement with Ukrzaliznytsia, covering around half of the railway's open-top railcar fleet. According to MetInvest, the agreement would reduce the company's logistics costs by around 4 billion hryvnias.
