= Kerch Fishing Port =

Coordinates: 45°20′17.9″N 36°27′37.0″E

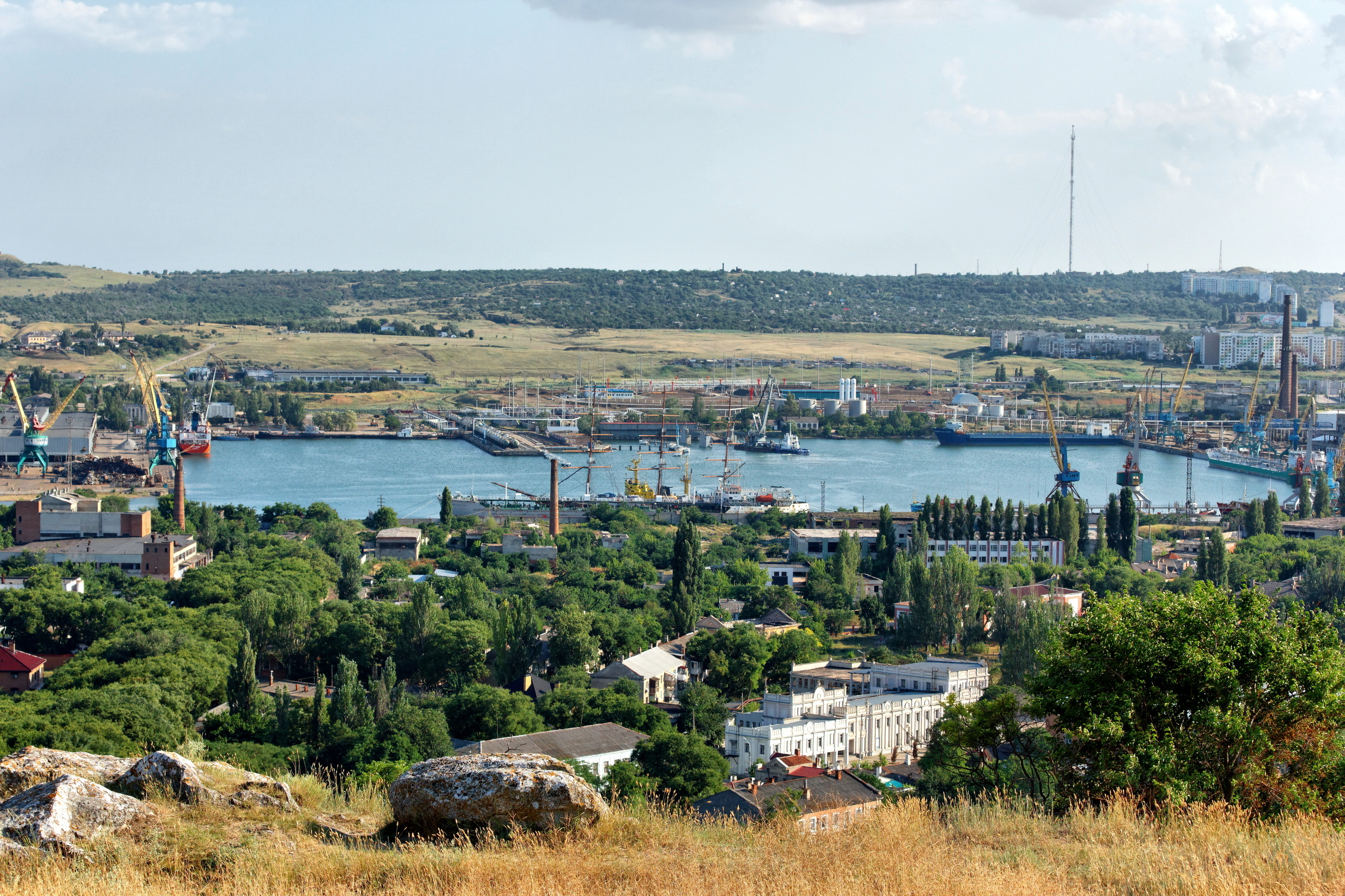
- Interactive map of Kerch Fishing Port

Location
- Country: Crimea
- Location: Kerch, Crimea

Details
- Opened: 1949
- Owned by: Sea/River Fleet Administration (government)
- Type of Harbor: Natural/Artificial
- No. of piers: 7
- Chief: Volodymyr Lytvynov

Statistics
- Website www.kmrp.com.ua

Kerch Fishing Seaport (Russian: Керченский рыбный порт, Ukrainian: Керченський морський рибний порт) is a fishing port of Black Sea (and Sea of Azov) located in the city of Kerch on the eastern shores Kerch Peninsula at Kerch Bay just south of the Port of Kerch.

The port has 7 piers.

== See also ==
- Port of Kerch
