= Port of Kerch =

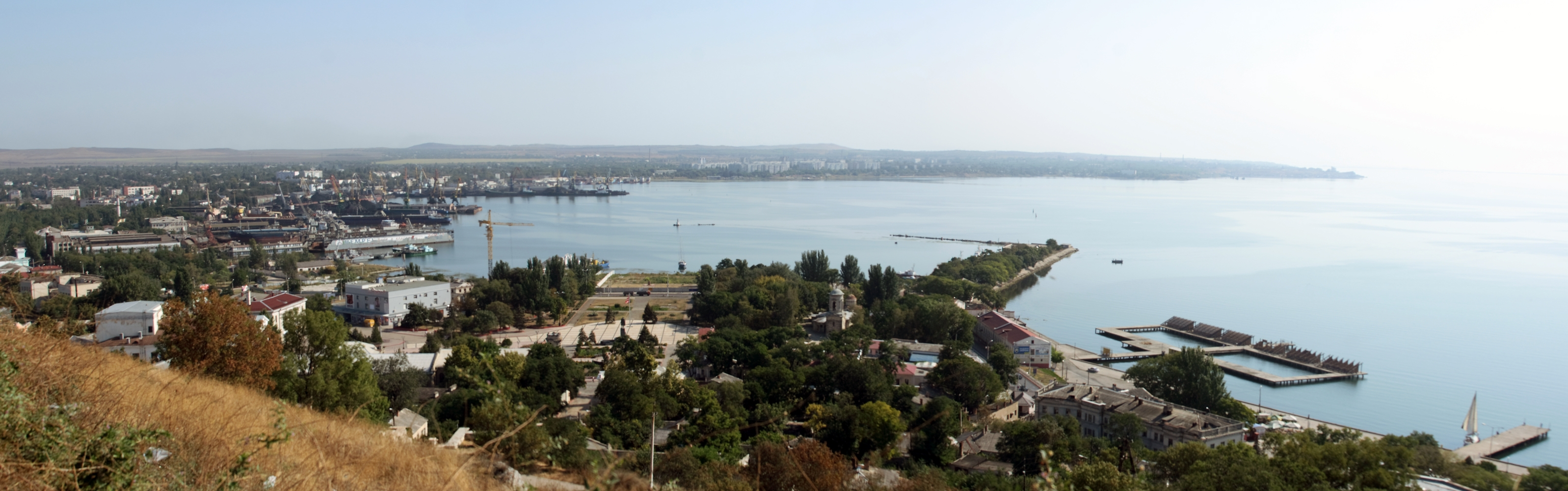
- Interactive map of Port of Kerch

Location
- Country: Crimea
- Location: Kerch, Crimea
- Coordinates: 45°21′31″N 36°29′02″E
- UN/LOCODE: UA KEH

Details
- Opened: 1821
- Owned by: Sea/River Fleet Administration (government)
- Type of harbour: Natural/Artificial
- No. of piers: 10
- Chief: Mykola Zelenkevych

Statistics
- Website www.kerchport.com

Kerch Marine Trade Seaport (Russian: Керченский морской торговый порт, Ukrainian: Керченський морський торговельний порт) is one of the oldest ports of Black Sea (and Sea of Azov) located in the city of Kerch on the eastern shores of the Kerch Peninsula at Kerch Bay.

The port has 10 piers.

== Information ==
The Crimean port of Kerch is located in close proximity to the Black Sea waterways of oil transportation, international transport corridors and the Bosphorus (the exit to the Mediterranean Sea).

The port is located on the shores of the Kerch -freezing bay. On the coast of the Kerch Strait coldest months - January and February. The prevailing wind - NE. The port is open for navigation all year round. The port provides cargo-handling services and storage in open areas, with a total area of 140,000 m^{2} (1,506,947 sq ft). and in covered warehouses of 12,000 m^{2} (129,167 sq ft).

The Tavrida highway connects the port of Kerch to Sevastopol.

== See also ==
- Kerch Fishing Port
