= Port of Skadovsk =

Coordinates: 46°6′24″N 32°54′41″E

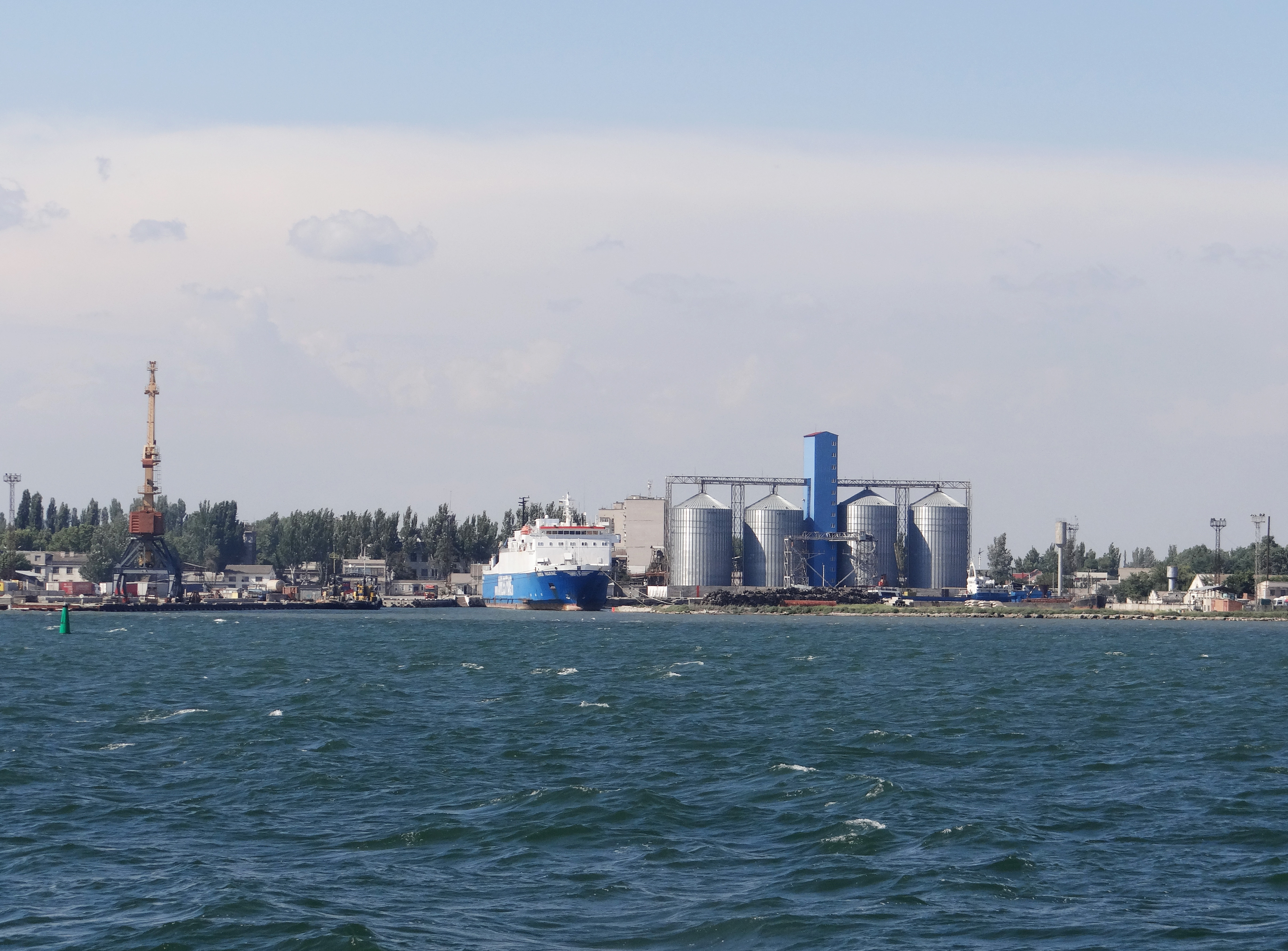
- Interactive map of Port of Skadovsk

Location
- Country: Ukraine
- Location: Skadovsk, Kherson Oblast

Details
- Opened: 1894
- Operated by: Port of Skadovsk Authority
- Owned by: Ukrainian Sea Ports Authority (government)
- Type of Harbor: Natural/Artificial
- Size: 11.12 ha
- No. of wharfs: 6
- Chief of Administration: Oleksandr Kugut

Statistics
- Website; Official website

The Port of Skadovsk (Ukrainian: Порт Скадовськ) is located in Skadovsk on the northern shores of Dzharylhach Bay, which is protected from the open seas by the island of Dzharylhach. The port operates all year around.

== History ==
On 11 December 2015 a new ferry route opened with Istanbul, Turkey. The ferry connection became possible after withdrawal of a Russian monopolist from the region soon after the annexation of Crimea by Russia in 2014. With government funding, the Port of Skadovsk was able to deepen the sea floor and rebuild wharfs. This ferry connection cost Ukraine ₴3,000,000 (US$200,000).

Following the 2022 Russian invasion of Ukraine, the port was occupied by Russian forces.

== See also ==
- List of ports in Ukraine
