= Delta Lotsman =

- Company type: state company
- Industry: vessel traffic
- Founded: 1998
- Headquarters: Mykolaiv, Ukraine
- Area served: Ukraine
- Website: www.delta-pilot.ua

The Delta Lotsman, or Delta Pilot, (Ukrainian: Державне підприємство "Дельта-лоцман") is a branch of state-owned company "Ukrainian Sea Ports Authority" and regulates vessel traffic in territorial waters of Ukraine and also providing navigation and piloting of marine vessels. The company is based in a capital of the Ukrainian shipbuilding Mykolaiv, Ukraine. It is governed by the Ukrainian Sea Ports Authority.

== Description ==
The company was chartered in February 1998. The company name consists of two words Delta which means a river mouth and Lotsman which is a pilot boat or a person who operates such boat. Delta Lotsman provides a safe voyage to all ports of Ukraine including through several canals Dnieper-Buh Estuary (BDLC), Kherson Marine Canal (KhMC) and the Deepwater Navigation Course Danube-Black Sea (see Bystroye Canal). The company has a well-developed infrastructure of vessel traffic control (RRS service) that consists of 13 centers and posts of the service, 12 automated radiolocating posts and four radio-technical communication posts.

In 2013 Delta Lotsman was turned into a branch of state company "Ukrainian Sea Ports Authority" which supervises all sea ports.

Delta-Lotsman also has its own specialized fleet of pilot boats including about 20 pilot cutters, few surveying cutters, a multifunctional tug with ice passing abilities and a dredging boat.

== Fleet ==
Due to the annexation of Crimea by the Russian Federation several ships were taken away by the Russian authorities. Most of those vessels are operated by the Russian company Lotsman-Krym.

- Project 1459 is an inshore pilot boat with power of 440 kW (590 hp). It was created by Leningrad Central Project Design Bureau, an all its ships were built by the Leningrad Shipyard "Pella" (Otradnoye, Russia) in 1977–1992) The cutter has two diesel engines of 3D12 type. These types of pilot boats are very common in the post Soviet countries including the Baltic states. In Ukraine most of these pilot boats owned and operated by the Delta Lotsman, but there are few that serve local sea ports.
  - Komsomolets Hutsal (1988)
  - LK-115 (1991)
  - Lotsman Mazhara (1987)
  - LK-121 (1992)
  - Morskoi-2 (1978) taken away by Russia
  - LK-88 (1989) taken away by Russia
  - LK-102 (1989) taken away by Russia
  - Almaz (1990) taken away by Russia
- Project 14550 is a modernized version of project 1459. Those are also the same type of pilot boats just a little improved. The vessels were designed and built by the same companies in 1990s after dissolution of the Soviet Union.
  - Kapitan Belukha (1995)
- Project 70161 is a Ukrainian type of pilot boats built at Okean Shipyard in Mykolaiv. These pilot boats have power of 716 kW (960 hp). There is only one known vessel.
  - Lotsman Kokhanov (2001)
