= Port of Kherson =

Seaport in Kherson, Ukraine

Coordinates: 46.626°N 32.618°E

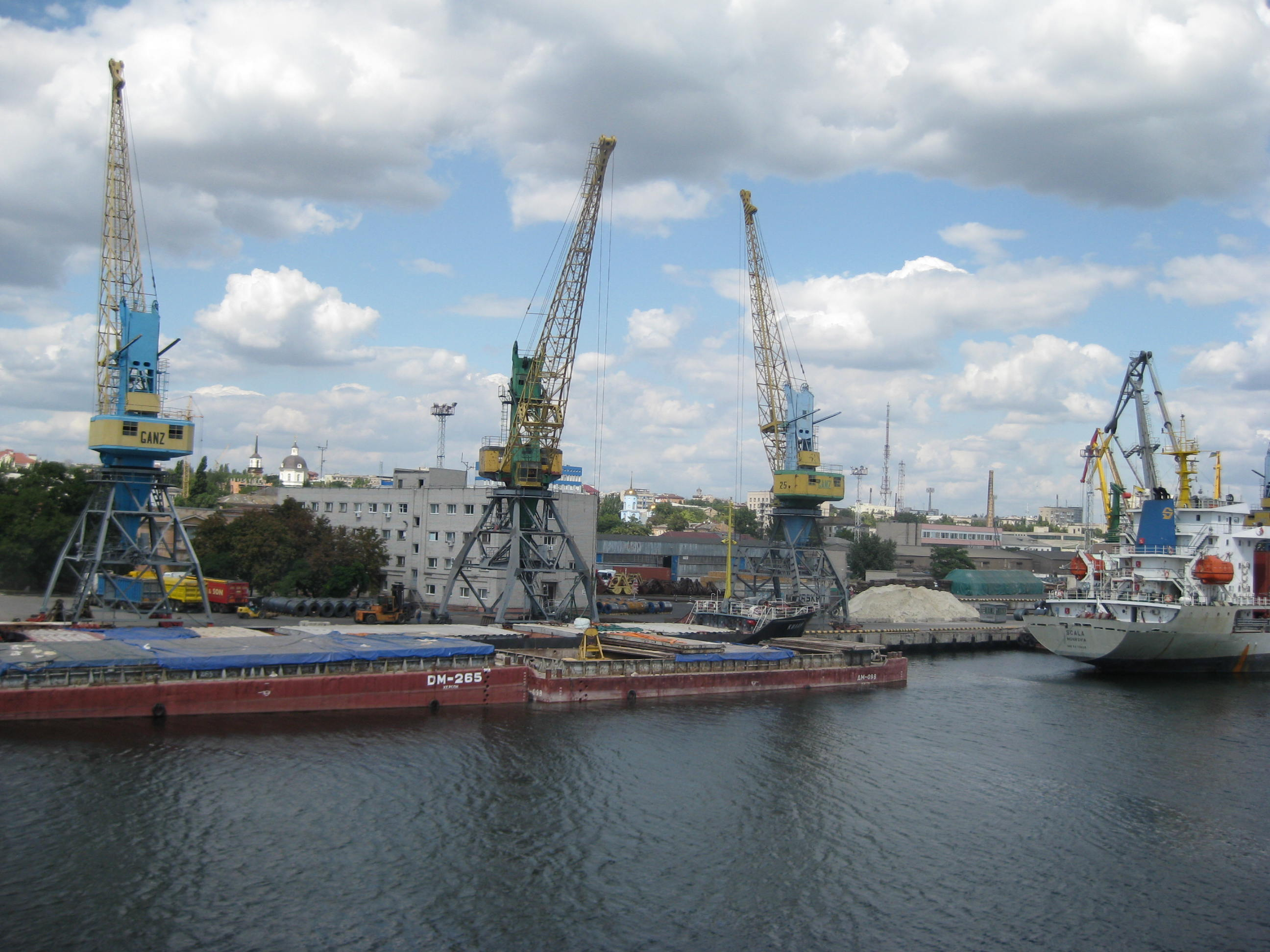
- Interactive map of Port of Kherson

Location
- Country: Ukraine
- Location: Kherson, Kherson Oblast

Details
- Opened: 1778
- Operated by: Kherson Port LLC
- Owned by: Ukrainian Sea Ports Authority (government)
- Type of harbour: Natural/artificial
- No. of berths: 10
- Chief: Anatoliy Yablunovskyi

Statistics
- Website portkherson.com.ua

The Seaport of Kherson (Ukrainian: Херсонський морський порт, romanized: Khersonsky morsky port) is in the city of Kherson, Ukraine, in the delta of the Dnieper river.

The berthing line of the seaport is 1.5 km (10 berths), with depths up to 9.6 m. The port is served by the railway station Kherson-Port, has one railway entry. There are 7 railway tracks in the port area with a total length of 3.2 km. The highways are adjacent to the port. The cargo turnover of Kherson seaport in 2016 amounted to 3.7 million tons. The capacity of terminals of Kherson seaport reaches 8.0 million tons / year.

Following the Russian invasion of Ukraine in 2022 the port was occupied, looted, and subjected to frequent shelling by Russian forces. This led to the near-total destruction of the port's infrastructure, and as of 2025, the port remains non-operational.

== History ==
In 1778, the city of Kherson was founded, and by 1803, Kherson started developing as a merchant port. In 1806, a government-funded shipyard was built, which launched 20-30 merchant vessels annually. However, in the late 1800s, dredging work on the Dnieper's river bed led to the closure of the port. It was reopened in 1901 after 30 years, and became important as a grain export hub.

=== Russian invasion of Ukraine ===
During the Russian invasion of Ukraine, after the port and Kherson was occupied by Russian troops, it was briefly suspended. It was reopened in June 2022, primarily to export looted Ukrainian cargo.

In November 2022, as part of the Kherson counteroffensive, Ukrainian forces regained the right bank of the Dnieper, including the right side of the port. Some parts of the port on the left bank still remain occupied. However, due to the Russian occupation and its subsequent shelling by Russian forces, the port was almost completely destroyed, with no concession on a plan from the government for its restoration having been proposed yet. Additional damage was caused by the Russian destruction of the Kakhovka Dam in 2023.

As of January 2024, the Ministry of Communities, Territories, and Infrastructure Development stated that the port could only resume operations after two conditions are met: the de-occupation of the left bank of Kherson Oblast and the cessation of Russian shelling of Kherson. The deputy minister stated it would be nearly impossible to reopen the port as it remained dangerous due to the Russian occupation of all nearby areas. In May 2025, the concessionaire Kherson Port LLC publicly also confirmed that the port's infrastructure would need to be rebuilt entirely from scratch. The company reported that they had sent official applications to the government for a joint development of a restoration plan, but had so far not received approval. The Kyiv Chamber of Commerce and Industry separately found that nearly all port properties had been destroyed, including 100% of the port's 68 units of transport and special equipment, all buildings and structures, all vessels and gantry cranes, and over three-quarters of other fixed assets.

== Ownership ==
In June 2020, the Kherson seaport was transferred to the concession of Risoil-Kherson LLC for a period of 30 years. Under the terms of the agreement with the government, the company promised to invest UAH 300 million in the development of the port and UAH 18 million in local infrastructure. It is obligated by 2030 that cargo transshipment volumes are at least 1.36 million tons, and there must be an increase in the share of cargo by rail and inland waterways to 80%. The concession had previously been under legal dispute after the Sixth Administrative Court of Appeal in Kyiv suspended the order, but after an appeal by the Ministry of Infrastructure, the Supreme Court of Ukraine overturned the suspension. The USPA Kherson branch still manages the port's infrastructure and regulatory oversight.

Since 2025, there have been active attempts to revise the concession agreement, as the concessionaire has argued that war-related destruction has rendered activities impossible. With Law No. 4510-IX "On Public-Private Partnership" coming into effect, there have been arguments to amend the contract to temporarily suspend the concession term or exemptions of payment.

== See also ==
- Battle of Kherson
- Kherson River Port
- List of ports in Ukraine
