= Port of Mariupol =

Coordinates: 47°03′21″N 37°30′18″E

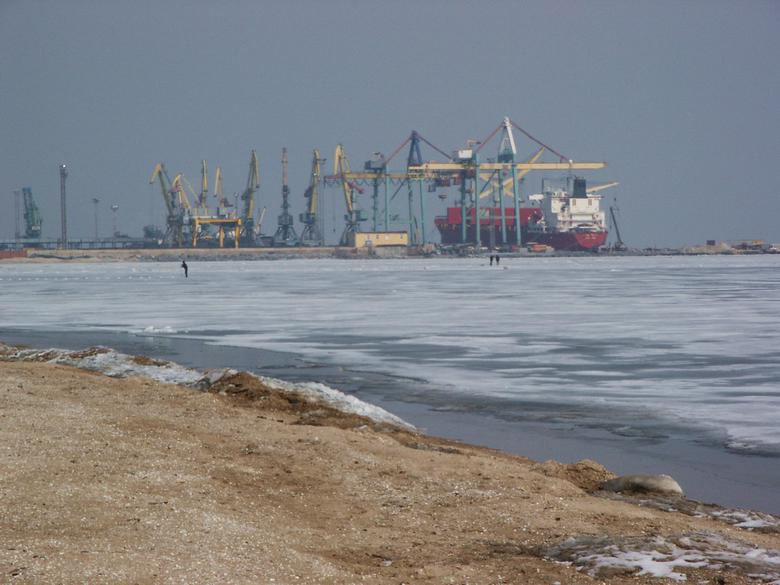
- Port of Mariupol, 2006
- Interactive map of Port of Mariupol

Location
- Country: Ukraine
- Location: Mariupol, Donetsk Oblast

Details
- Opened: September 2, 1889
- Head of the seaport administration: Sergey Vladimirovich Gusakov

Statistics
- Website; Port Administration Site

The Port of Mariupol or Mariupol Sea Port (Ukrainian: Маріупольський морський порт) is located in Mariupol, Ukraine in the Taganrog Bay, Sea of Azov. The port is governed by the port authority managed by Ukrainian Sea Ports Authority. As of June 2022, it is occupied by Russian armed forces.

The berthing line of the seaport is 3.9 km (22 berths), with depths down to 9.75 meters. The port is served by one port railway station "Mariupol-Port." The total length of the railways of the port is 27,1 km. Highways are adjacent to the port.

The cargo turnover of Mariupol seaport in 2016 amounted to 7.6 million tons, the capacity of Mariupol seaport reaches 18.8 million tons per year.

The port has the largest repair facility of its class on the Sea of Azov.

== History ==
=== Origins ===
The port authority of Mariupol was established on 9 June 1808 following a decree from Emperor Alexander I, establishing regulations for the development of customs and quarantine facilities, berthing areas and lighthouses

The birth of the port of Mariupol was a logical continuation of rapid development of the industrial Russian South in the second half of 19th century. The shallow wharf in the mouth of the Kalmius River did not meet the development requirements of the fleet along with those of the mining and metallurgical industry of Donets basin.

In 1840 a stone embankment was built. However, due to the shallow draft of the harbour, tenders were used to transport goods to and from the roadstead.

=== Crimean War ===
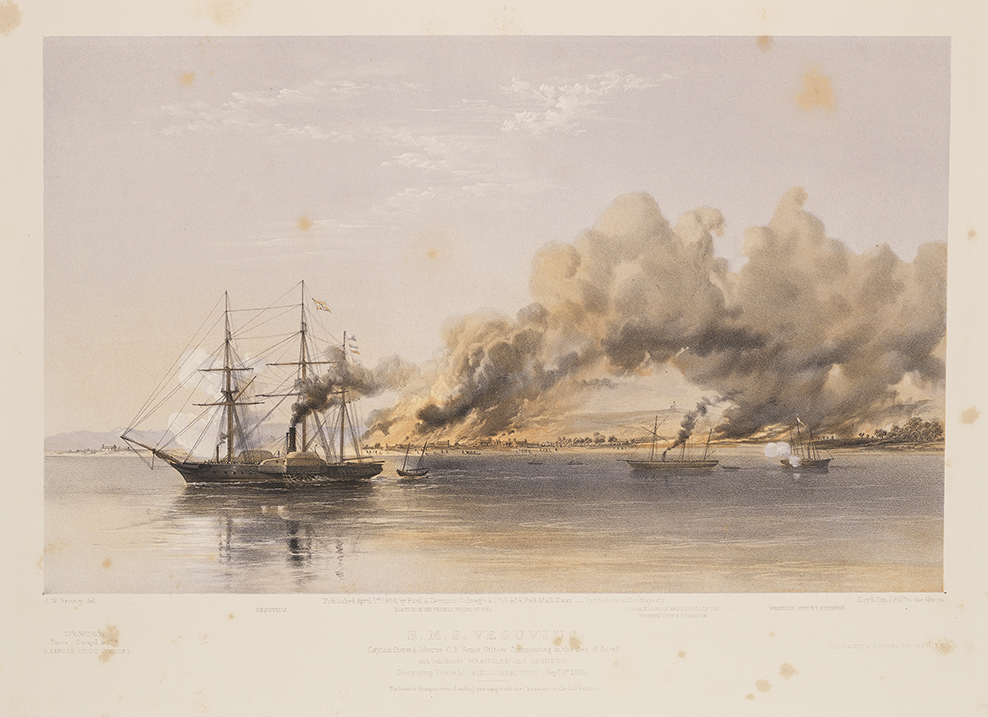
HMS Vesuvius during the Azov campaign.

The port sustained significant damage during the Crimean War, as part of the punitive Anglo-French Sea of Azov naval campaign, sustaining naval bombardment and landing parties, resulting in the destruction of 425,000 rubles worth of grain, as well as a significant number of residential and commercial buildings.

=== Expansion ===
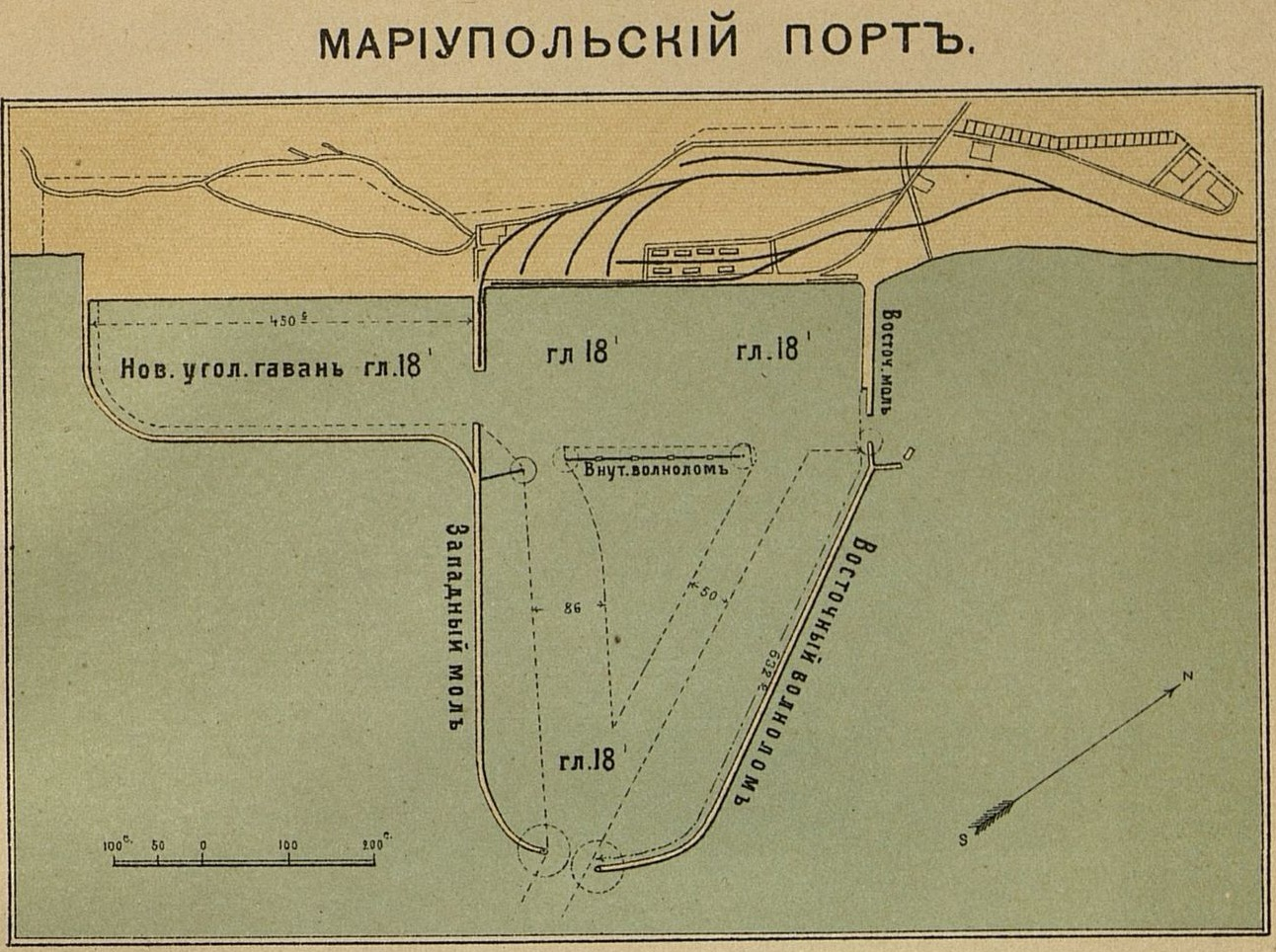
Scheme of Mariupol Port in 1902.

In 1882, a branch of the Shipwreck Relief Society, later the Imperial Russian Society for Water Rescue (VOSVOD) opened an office at the port.

In 1886 the construction of a new deepwater port began near Zintseva Balka. Construction was expected to take five years, but was completed in three with the support of local industrialists. Three moles and two breakwaters, as well as an embankment were built. In addition, the harbour was deepened, a paved access highway was laid, and a railway spur was built connecting the port. A number of additional supporting buildings and structures were also built. The mouth of the Kalmius River was also deepened, and a kilometer long canal was dredged into the sea. On 2 September 1889, the grand opening of the newly built port took place, with the first export load of 18 railcars carrying 2,000 poods of coal bought to the port for shipment. After a prayer in the presence of Adolf von Hübbenent, the Russian Minister of Railways, as well as the Governor of Mariupol Kharazhaev, the first shipment was loaded onto the Russian Society of Shipping and Trade steamship Medveditsa on 3 September 1889.

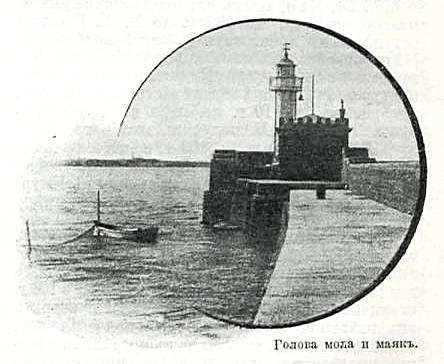
Sytin's Military Encyclopedia - Mariupol Port

The port had a significant impact on the development of Southern Russia and the Russian Empire as a whole. In the period of 1867 to 1904, the port was ranked third in the Russian Empire among civil ports by shipping volume. The port had a significant economic impact on the surrounding area, with most notably the Russian government granting the American firm Rothstein and Smith permission to establish the Nikopol-Mariupol Mining and Metallurgical Works. In addition to the ports primary role as a cargo terminal, several passenger services were established to Taganrog, Yeysk, Berdyansk and Kerch, from the old pier on the Kalmius River.

On 26 May 2022, following closure during the Siege of Mariupol, Russia reopened the port to commercial vessels following naval mine removal. TASS stated that the port was operating at full capacity by July 2022. The first bulk carrier, carrying grain, was reportedly loaded by the Donetsk People's Republic in 2023 to be exported. In June 2024, the city's exiled mayor, Vadym Boychenko, said that a Russian tanker had entered the port for the first time since its capture, and that it was being used for military use.

== Gallery ==
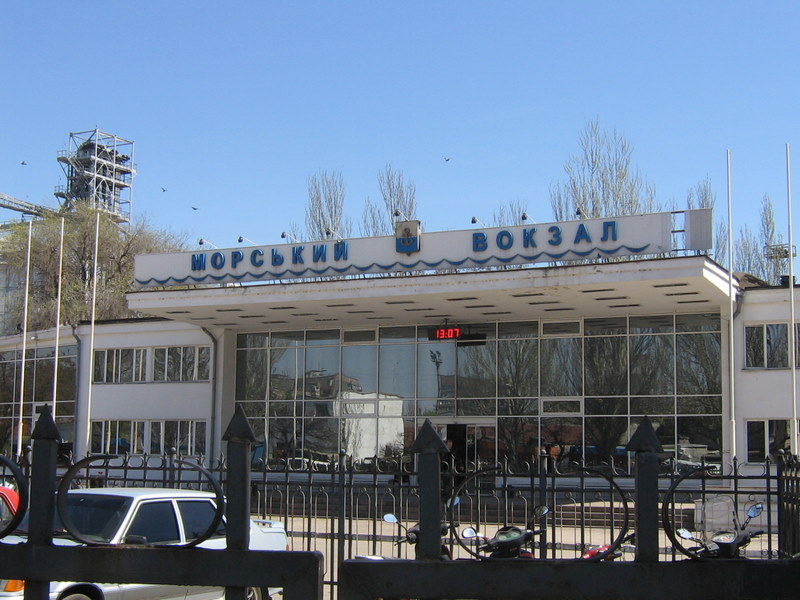
Seaport terminal in 2010.

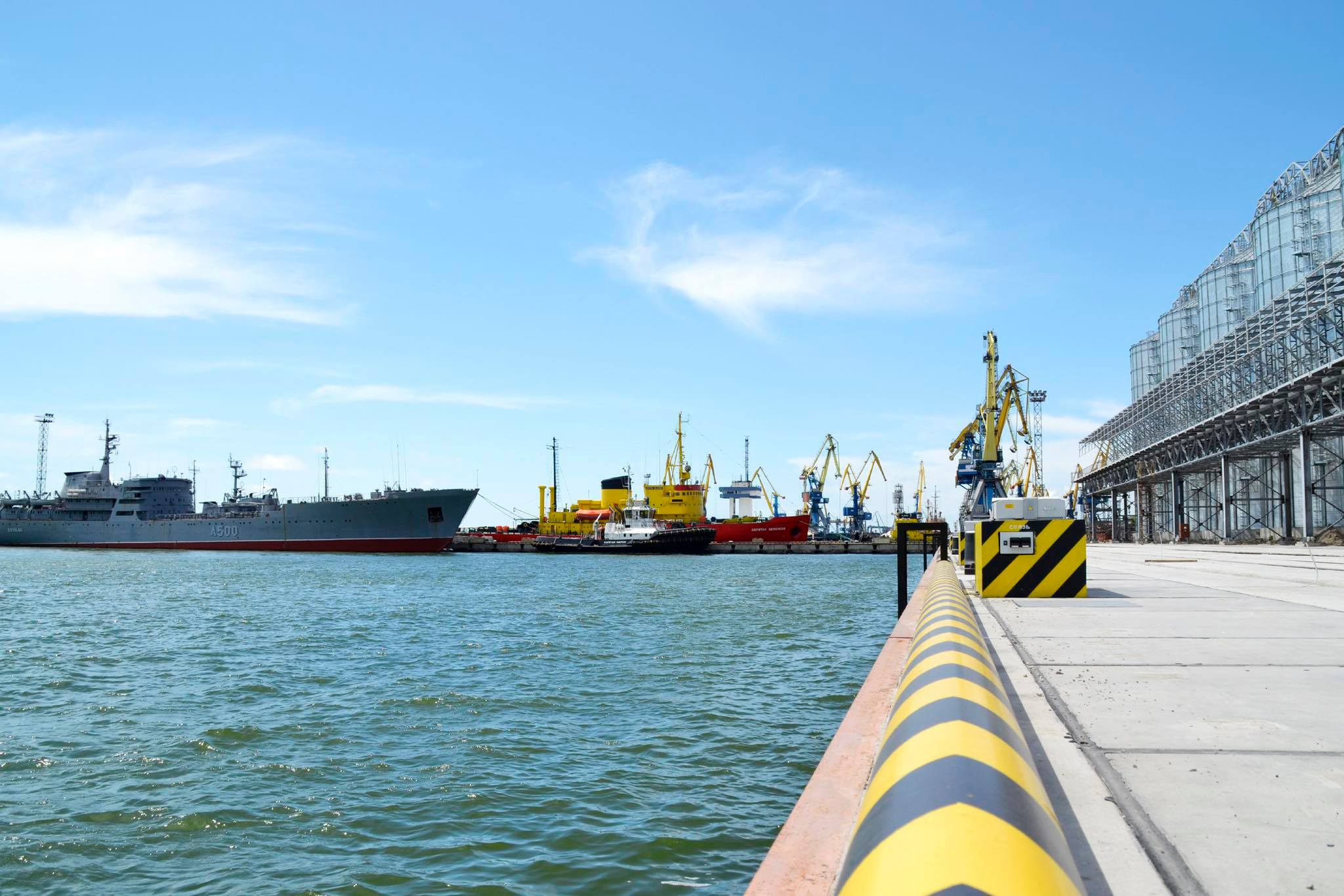
Port of Mariupol, January 2020.

== See also ==
- List of ports in Ukraine
- Transport in Ukraine
