= Port of Yevpatoria =

Coordinates: 45°11′19.02″N 33°22′30.99″E

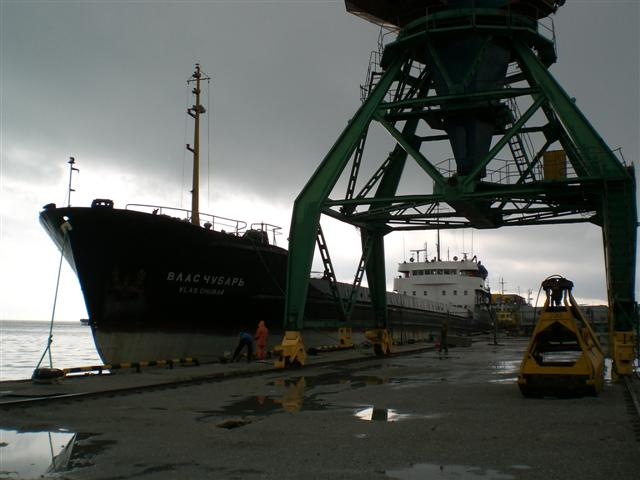
- Interactive map of Port of Yevpatoria
- Native name: Євпаторійський морський торговельний порт

Location
- Country: Ukraine
- Location: Yevpatoria (1 Moryakov Sq.), Ukraine

Details
- Opened: 1828
- Operated by: Ministry of Infrastructure (Ukraine); Temporarily occupied by RF
- Type of Harbor: natural / artificial
- Director: Tymur Oleksandrovych Kondratʹyev

Yevpatoria Commercial Sea Port is a large Black Sea port, the largest enterprise in the city of Yevpatoria (Autonomous Republic of Crimea).

== See also ==
- List of ports in Ukraine
- Transport in Ukraine
