= Port of Feodosia =

Port in Crimea

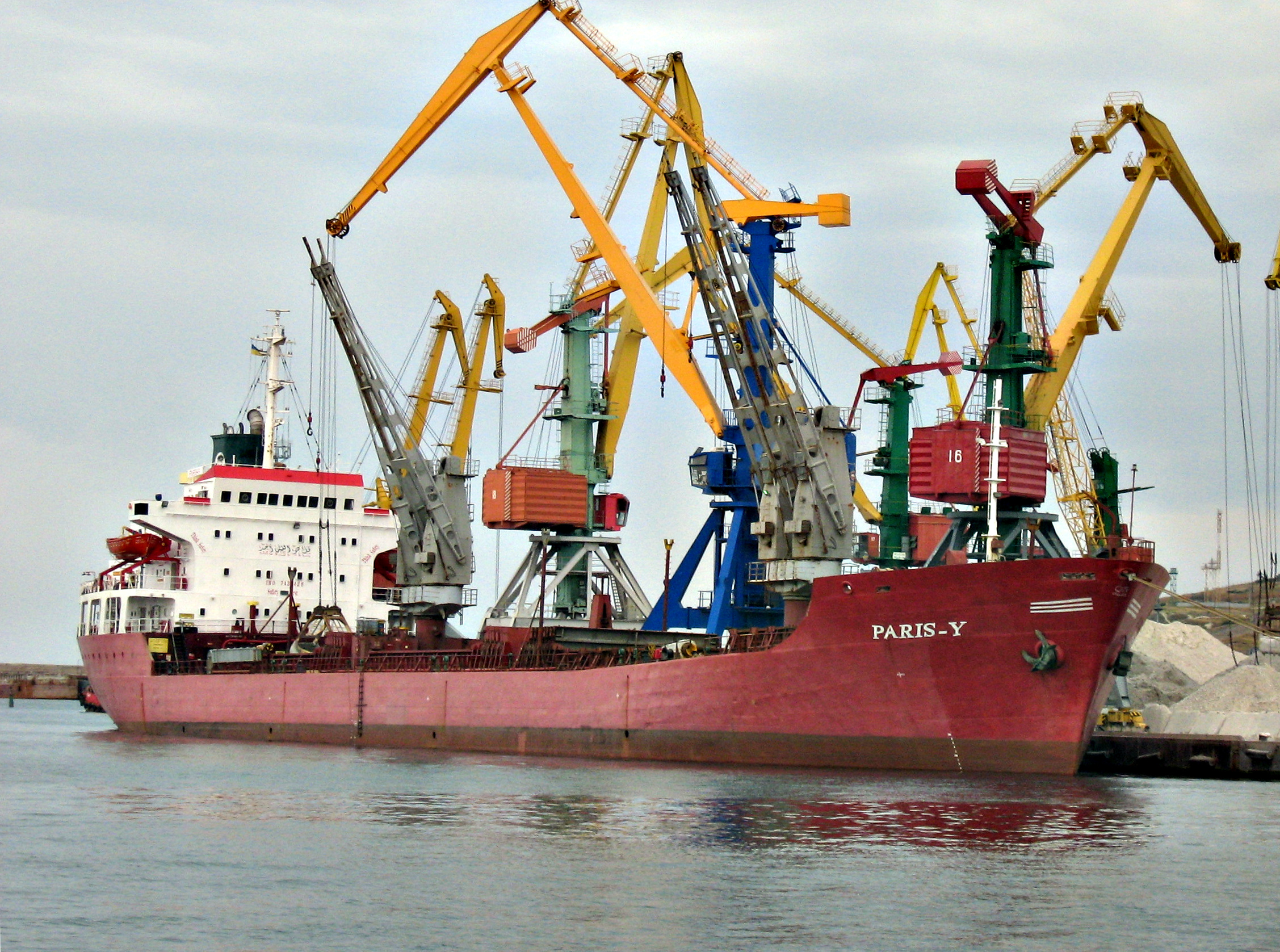
- Click on the map for a fullscreen view
- Native name: Феодосійський морський торговельний порт

Location
- Country: Ukraine occupied by Russia
- Location: Feodosia, Gorky Street, 14
- Coordinates: 45°01′40″N 35°23′20″E

Details
- Opened: 1892-1895
- Operated by: State enterprise Temporarily occupied by RF
- Type of harbour: natural / artificial
- Head of the Port: Oleksandr Mykolayovych Chumachenko

The State Enterprise Feodosia Sea Commercial Port is a seaport in the city of Feodosia, Ukraine, located on the southern shore of Feodosia Bay, in the western part of the bay northwest of Cape Feodosia.

== See also ==
- List of ports in Ukraine
- Transport in Ukraine
