= Pivdennyi Port =

Seaport in Odesa region, Ukraine

Pivdennyi Seaport
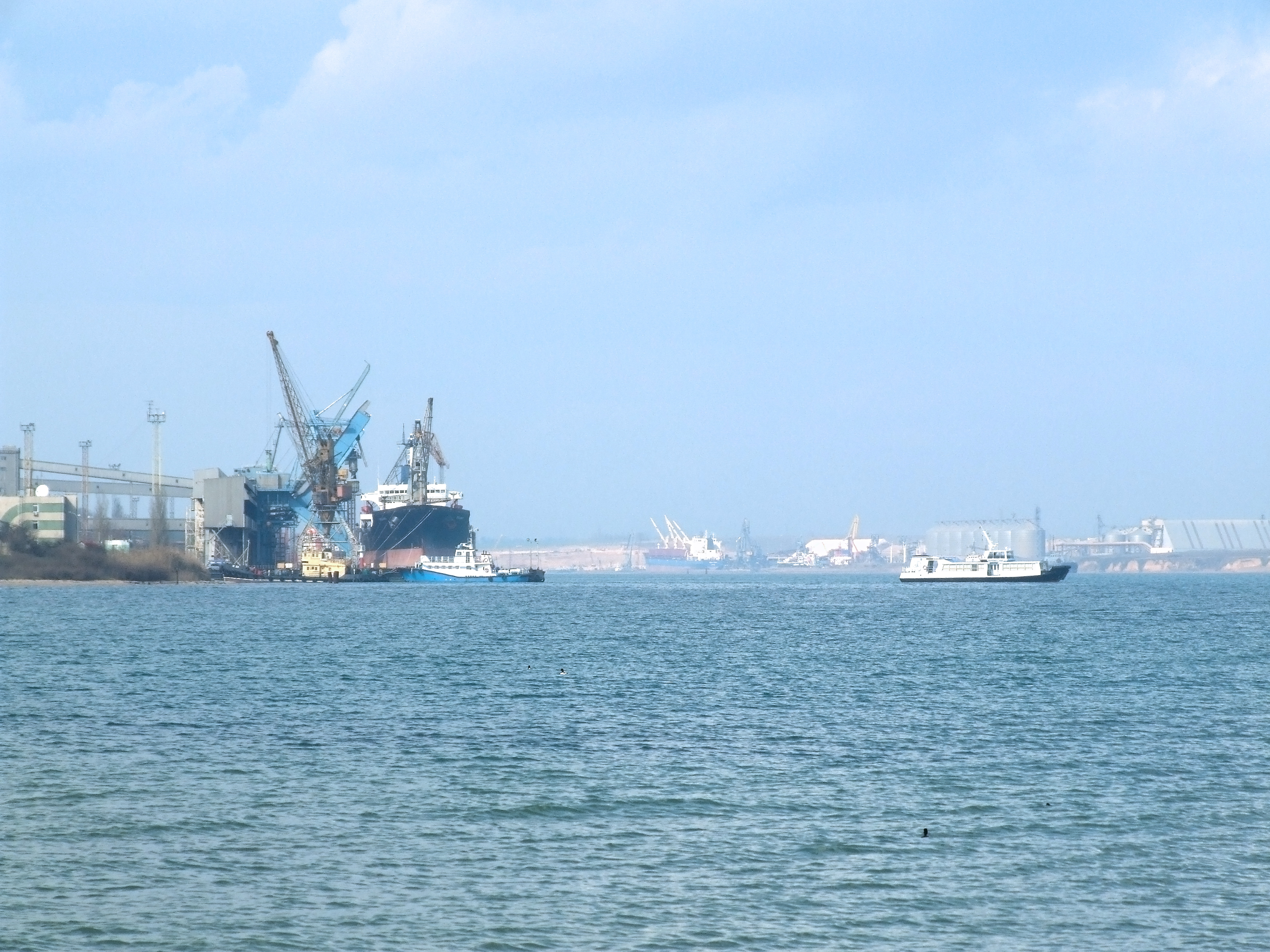
- Pivdennyi Port, 2008.
- Interactive map of Pivdennyi Seaport
- Native name: Морський порт «Південний»

Location
- Country: Ukraine
- Location: Pivdenne, Odesa Oblast
- Coordinates: 46°37′00.6″N 31°01′32.9″E

Details
- Opened: July 27, 1978
- Owned by: State enterprise
- Type of harbour: natural / artificial
- No. of berths: 34 - 2700 m (depth of berth - 19 m)
- Head of port: Oleksandr Basyuk

Statistics
- Annual cargo tonnage: 61.66 million tons (2020)
- Nearest stations & ports: Berehova Railway; Odesa Airport; Odesa Seaport
- Pit stop: refueling, water, repair
- Radio / Radar: "Pivdennyi-Radio-1," channels 4, 16, 60 / PRDS "Pivdennyi"
- Website port-yuzhny.com.ua

The Pivdennyi Seaport (Ukrainian: Морський порт "Південний", romanized: Morskyi port 'Pivdennyi'; known as Yuzhnyi from Russian: Южный, lit. 'Southern' before 2017) is a commercial seaport in the Ukrainian city of Pivdenne near Odesa, on the Black Sea coast.

It is the largest and most ioerationally profitable port of Ukraine. According to the American Association of Port Authorities it was ranked the 91st (48,582 thousand tons) in 2015 in terms of total cargo turnover among the world's ports. According to the Law of Ukraine "On Seaports of Ukraine," the functions of the seaport administration are performed by the Southern branch of the state enterprise of the Ukrainian Sea Ports Authority.

== History ==
The port started operating on July 27, 1978, when the Bulduri gas carrier of the Latvian Shipping Company was moored.

In 1980, the first artificial reef in the USSR was built here (it was an artificial reef-breakwater).

On January 17, 2017, Minister of Infrastructure of Ukraine Volodymyr Omelyan ordered to rename by April 29, 2017, the names of state enterprises, institutions and infrastructure facilities that have symbols of the communist regime, as well as names containing Russism or in non-Ukrainian language. On April 17, 2019, the Cabinet of Ministers of Ukraine renamed the port changing it from "Yuzhnyi" to "Pivdennyi."

In December 2021, Pivdennyi port handled 5.77 million tons of cargo, which was a new monthly record of the port.

== Gallery ==
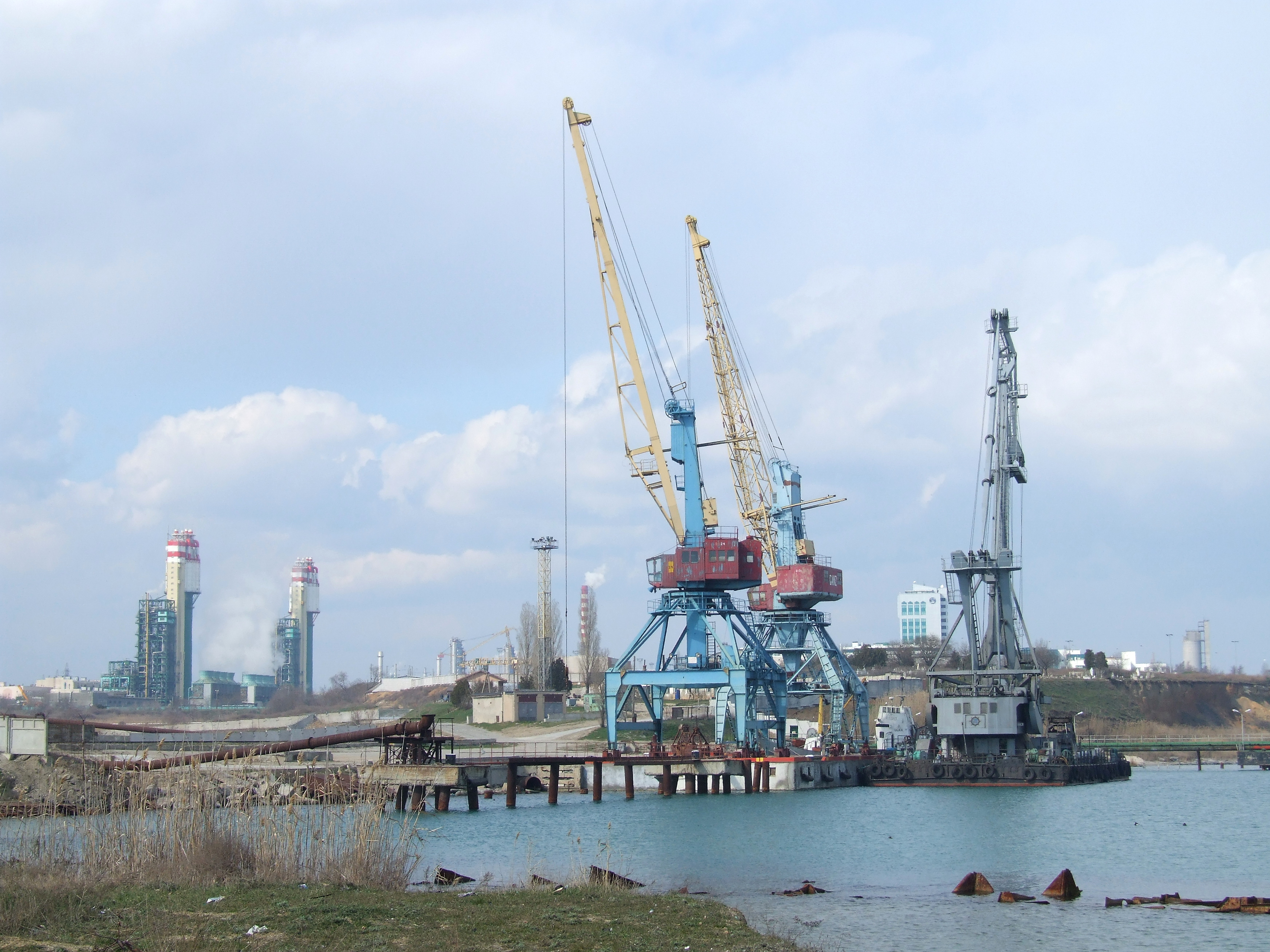
Port of Pivdennyi, 2008

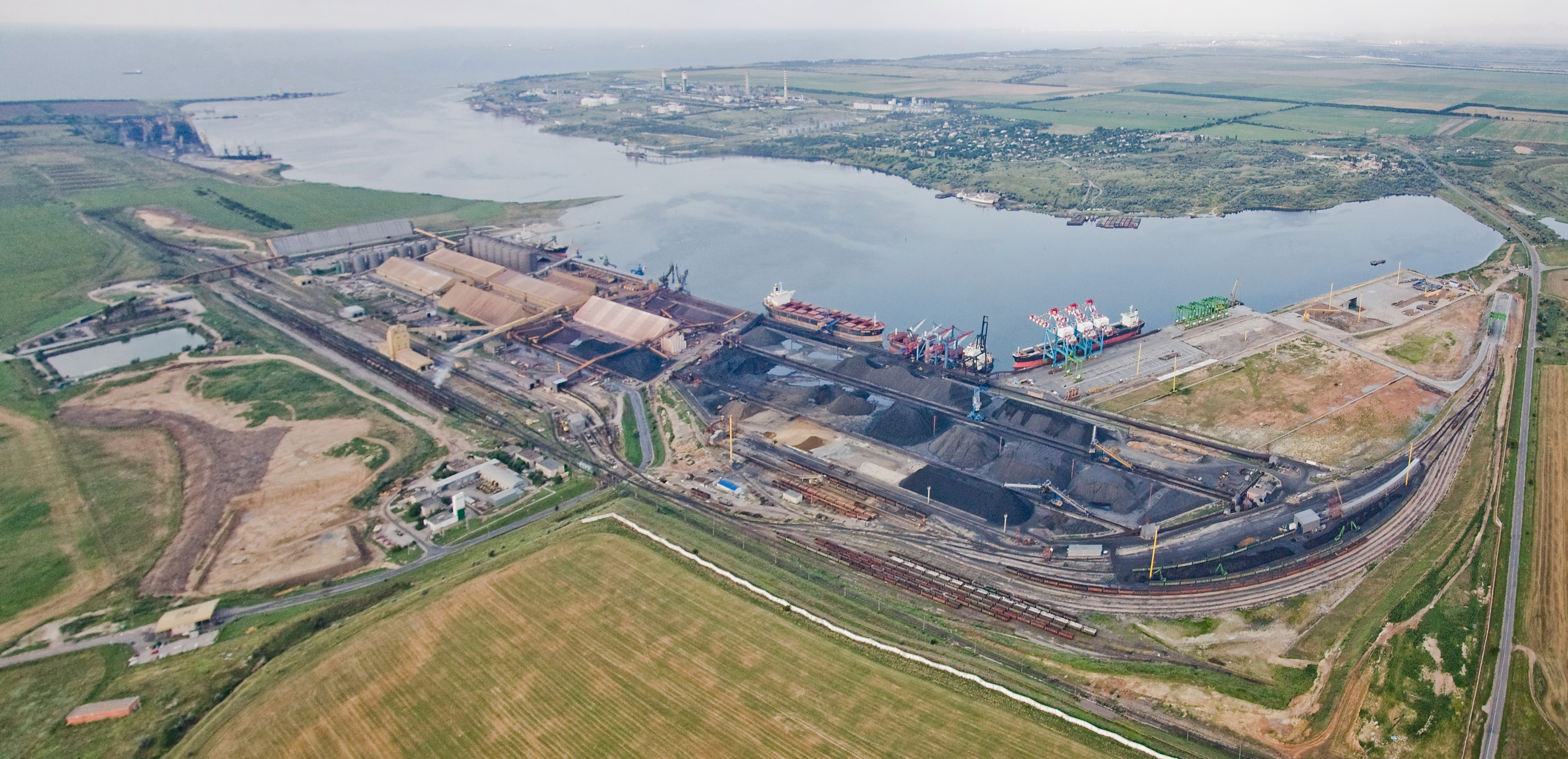
Panorama of TIS Terminal, July 2010.

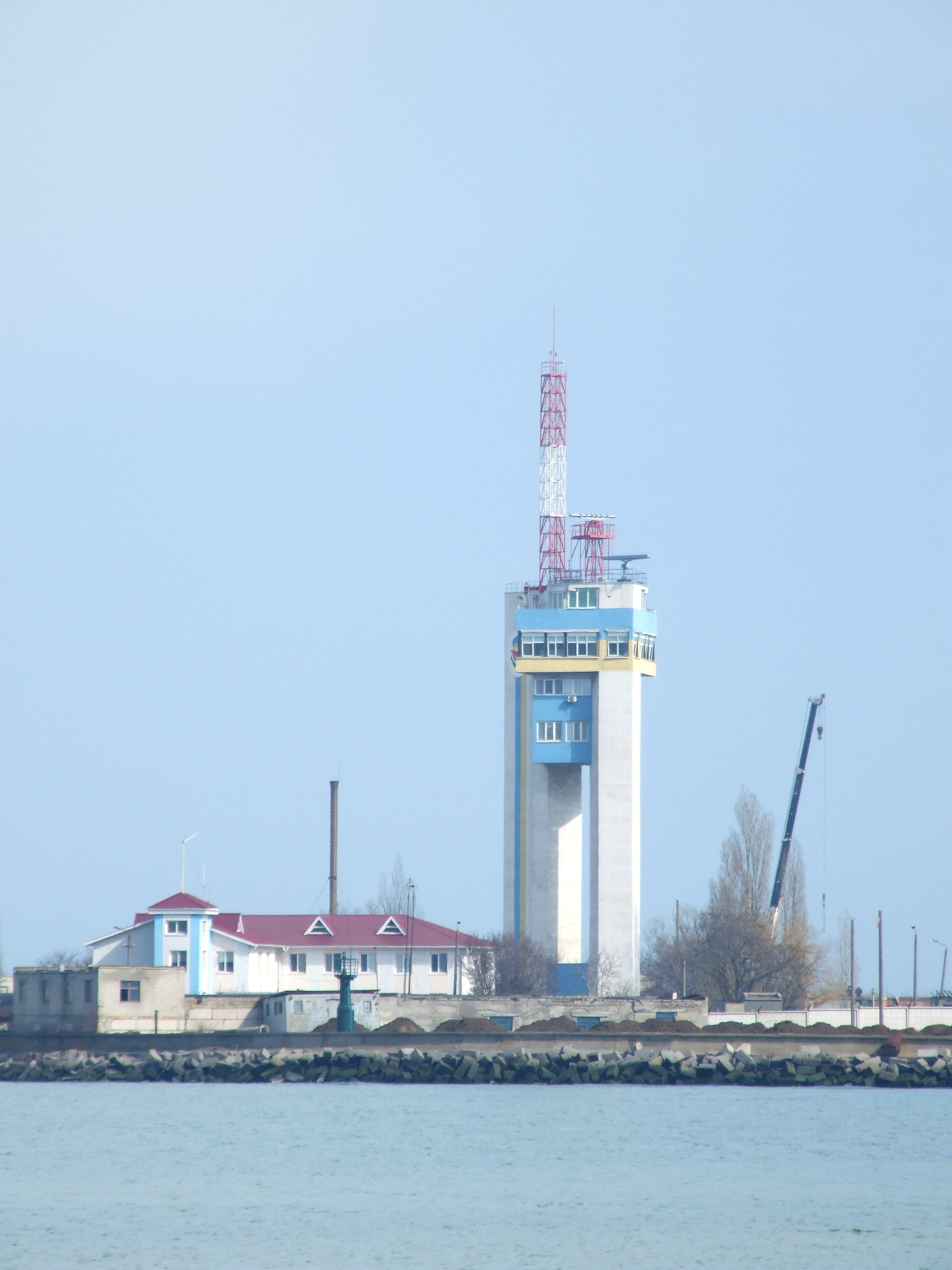
Port of Pivdennyi - coast radar station, March, 2008.

== See also ==
- List of ports in Ukraine
- Transport in Ukraine
