= Port of Yalta =

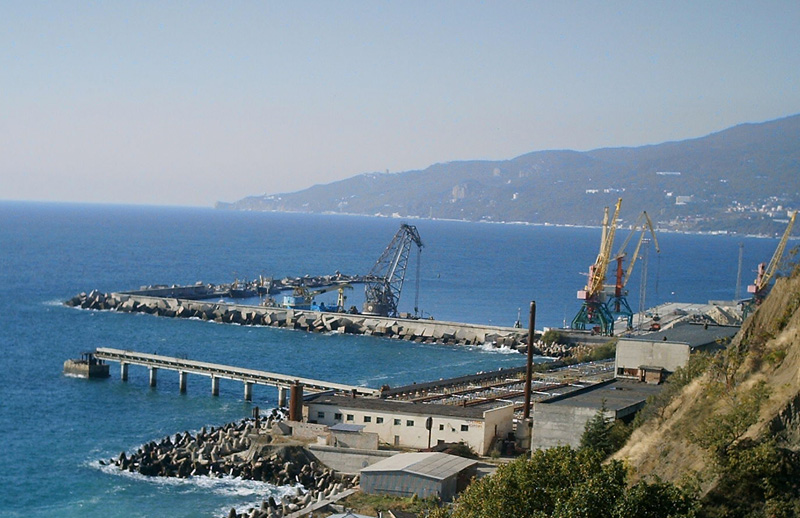
- Interactive map of Port of Yalta
- Native name: Ялтинський морський порт

Location
- Country: Ukraine
- Location: Yalta, Ruzvyel'ta Street, 3

Details
- Opened: August 14, 1833
- Operated by: Black Sea Shipping Company
- Type of Harbor: natural/artificial
- Employees: 600
- Head of Port: Fedor Pavlovich Bedin

Yalta Sea Commercial Port is a commercial seaport in the city of Yalta, Ukraine, on the Black Sea coast of Crimea. The port is originally subordinated to the Black Sea Shipping Company, now Ukrmorrichflot. Yalta sea trade port carries out transportation and processing of cargoes, and serves passengers in sailing abroad and in small cabotage.

== See also ==
- List of ports in Ukraine
- Transport in Ukraine
- Cargo turnover of Ukrainian ports
