= Kerch Bay =

Coordinates: 45°20′37″N 36°30′04″E

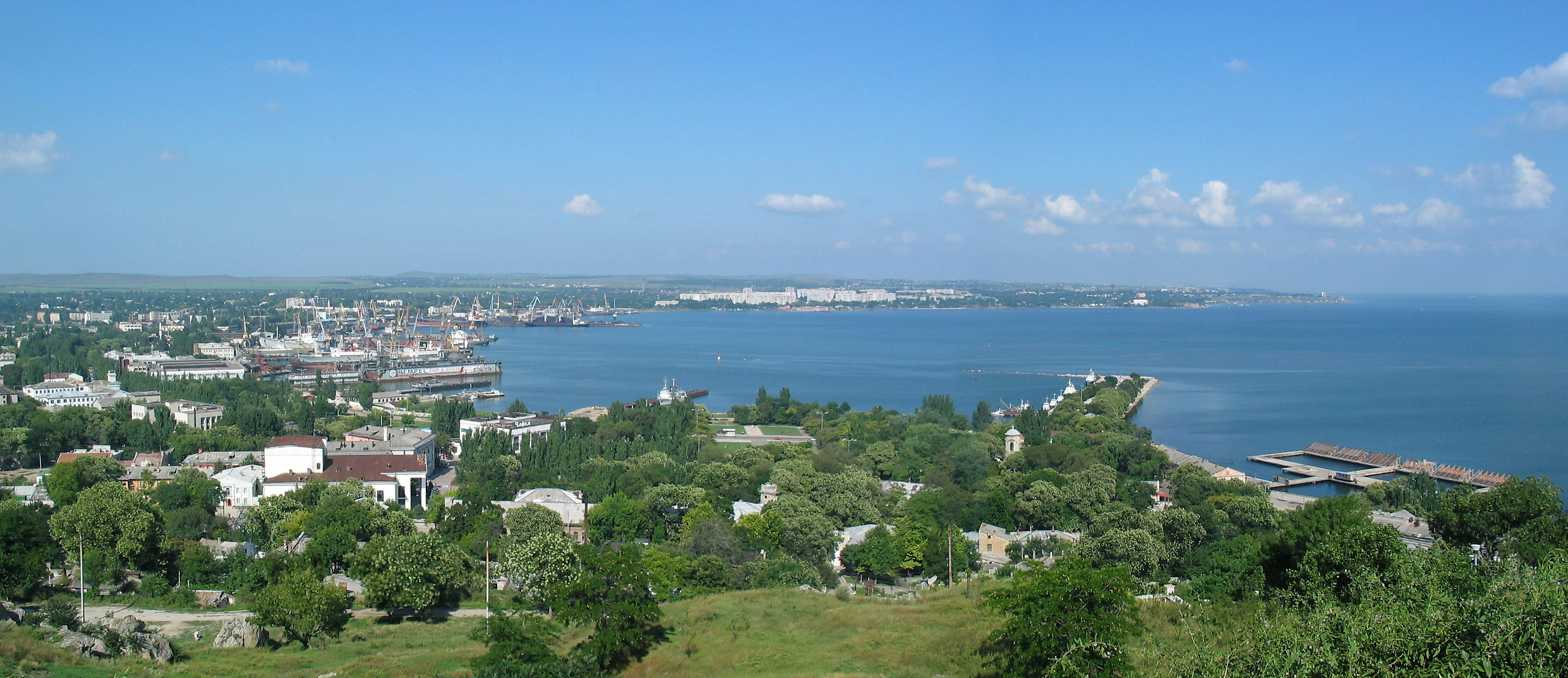

- Location within Crimea
- Location: Sea of Azov
- Ocean/sea sources: Atlantic Ocean
- Basin countries: Russia/Ukraine
- Max. length: 4.3 km (2.7 mi)
- Max. width: 5 km (3.1 mi)
- Average depth: 5 m (16 ft)

Kerch Bay (Russian: Керченская бухта; Ukrainian: Керченська бухта; Crimean Tatar: Keriç körfezi, Керич корьфези) is a bay of the Sea of Azov and Strait of Kerch in the eastern Crimea region.

It is located at the eastern Kerch Peninsula, near the municipality of Kerch.

== Archaeology ==
In 2017, a head of an ancient Greek God was discovered during underwater construction operations at the Kerch Bay. It was crafted sometime between the 5th and 3rd centuries BC.
