= KDMC =

KDMC may refer to:

- Kalyan-Dombivali Municipal Corporation, the governing body of Kalyan-Dombivli, Maharashtra, India
- KDMC-FM, a radio station (88.7 FM) licensed to serve Van Buren, Missouri, United States
- KDMC-LP, a defunct low-power radio station (103.7 FM) formerly licensed to serve Cape Girardeau, Missouri
- King's Daughters Medical Center, Ashland, Kentucky, United States

== See also ==
- KDC (disambiguation)
- KDM (disambiguation)
