= Pereiaslav =

City in Kyiv Oblast, Ukraine

Pereiaslav Переяслав
- City
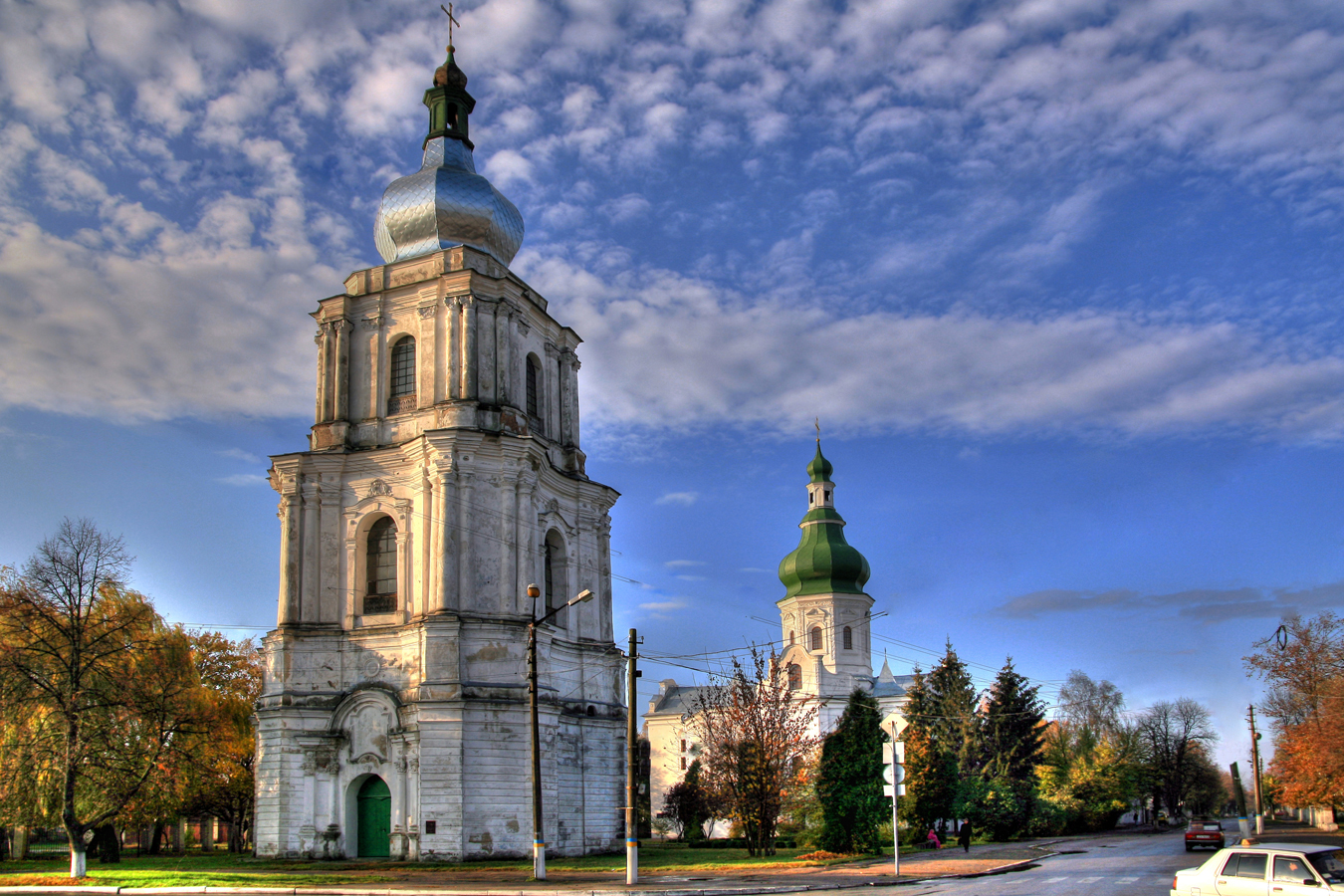
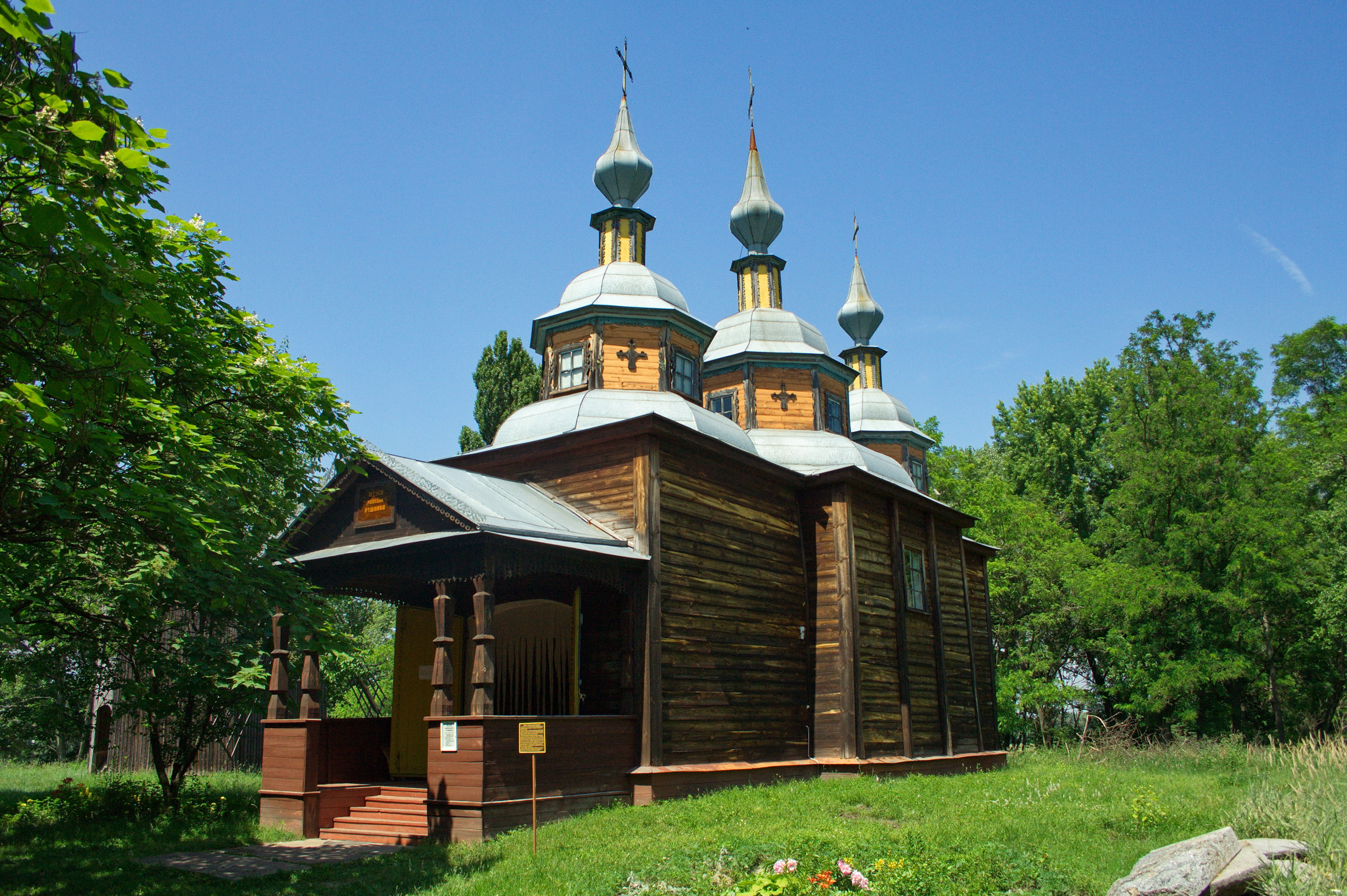
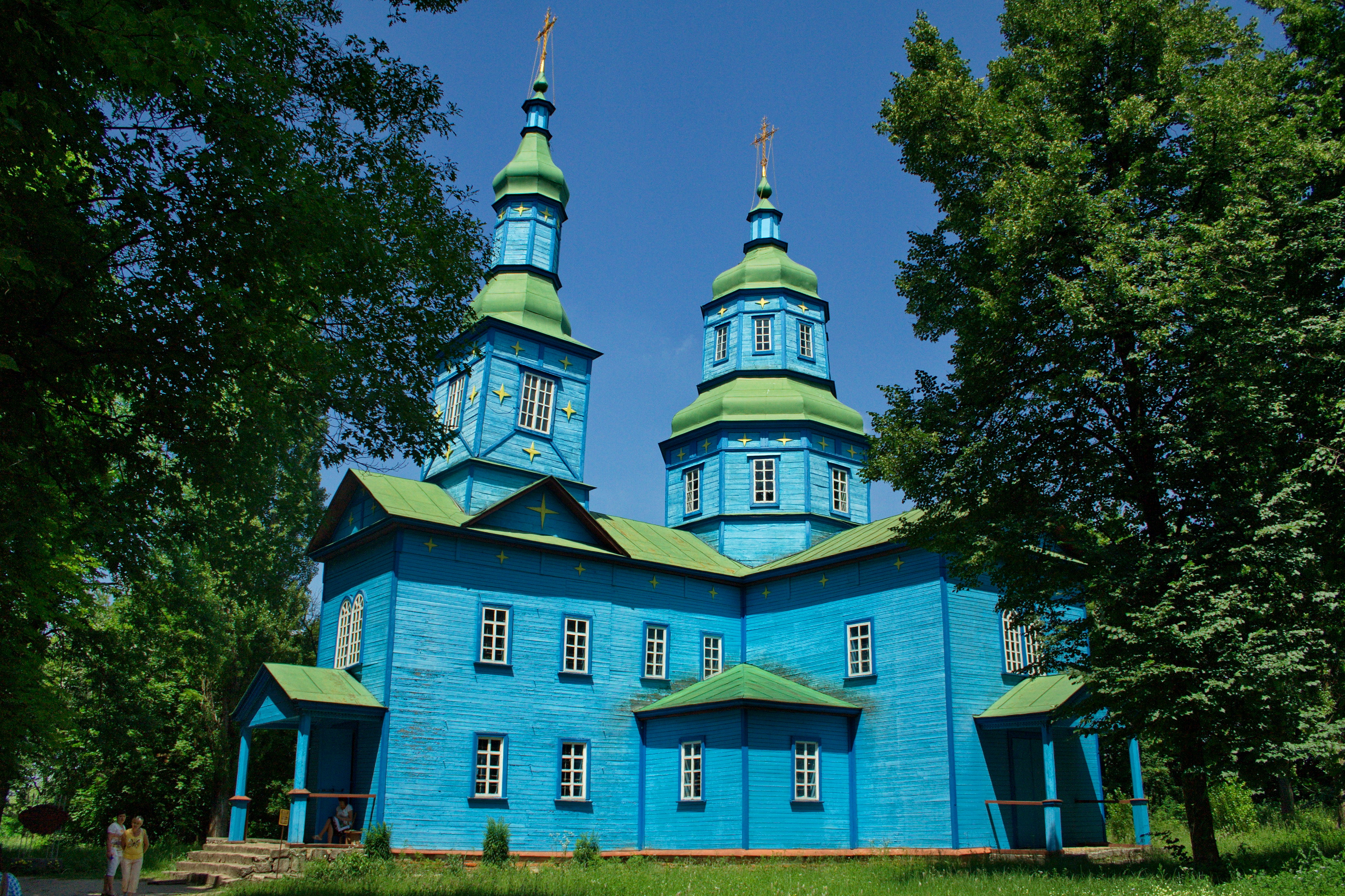
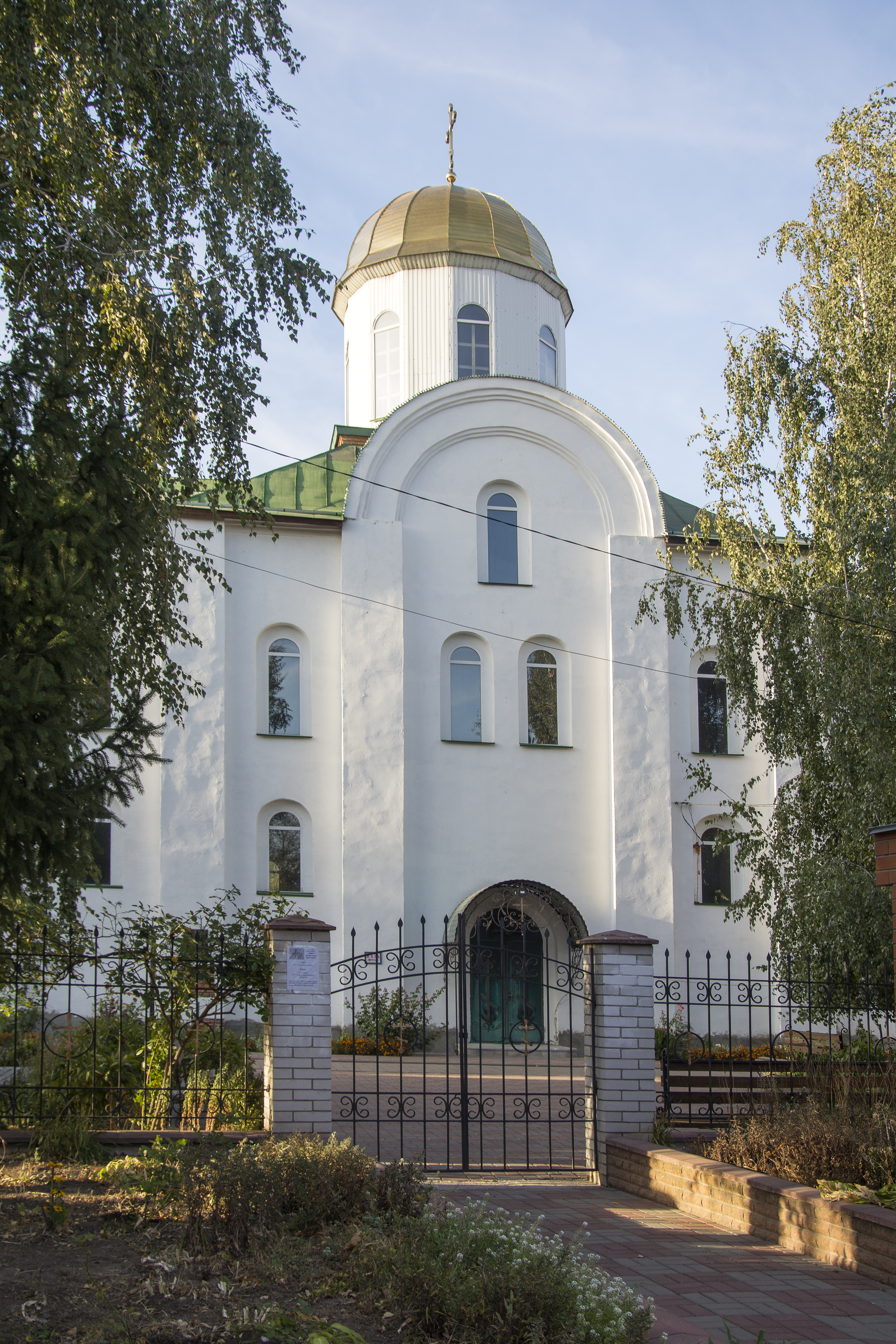
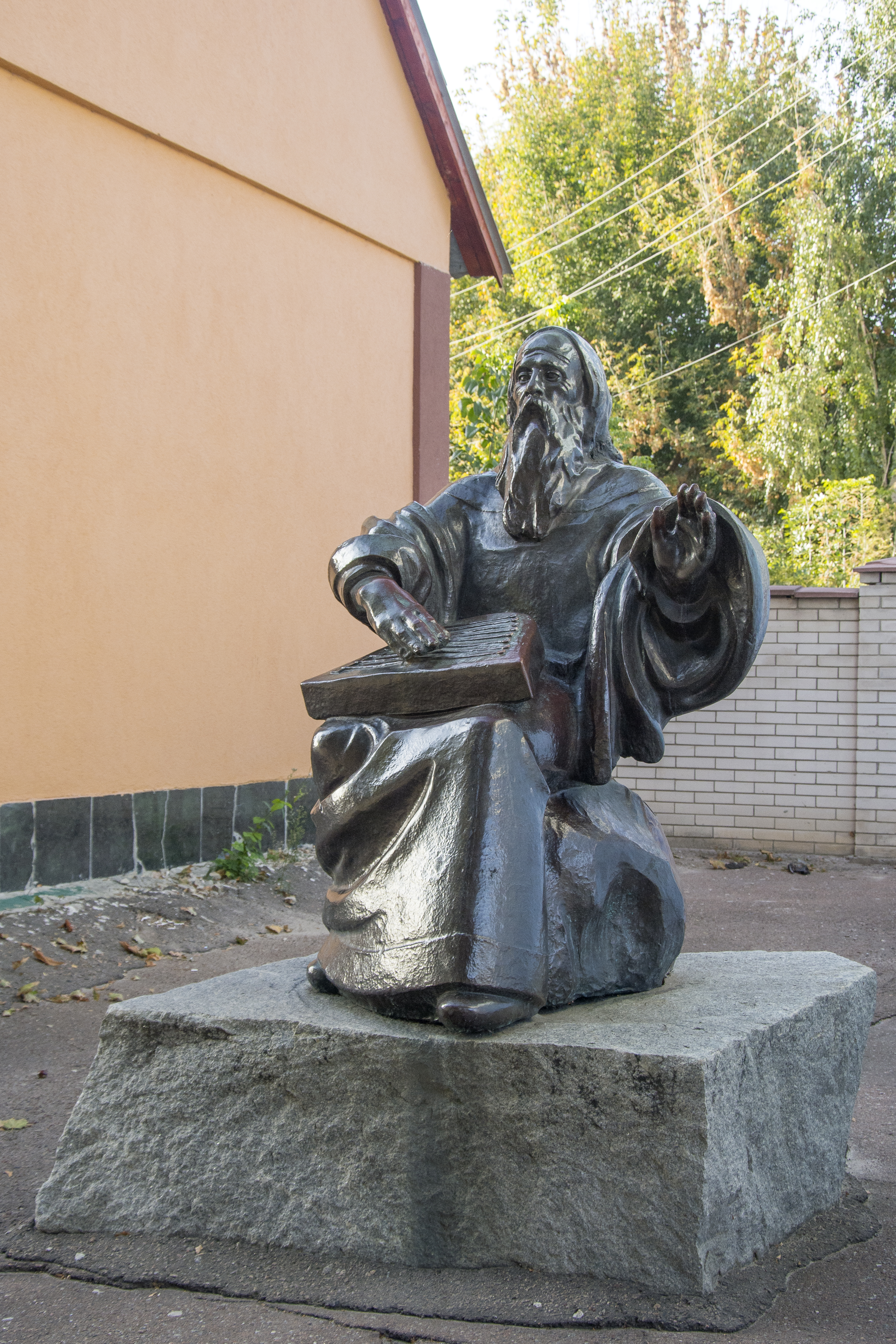
- Ascension Monastery Three Holy Hierarchs Church (Museum of Rushnyk) St. George's Church Resurrection Church Monument to Boyan

- Flag Coat of arms
- Interactive map of Pereiaslav
- Location within Kyiv Oblast Location within Ukraine
- Coordinates: 50°03′54″N 31°26′42″E
- Country: Ukraine
- Oblast: Kyiv Oblast
- Raion: Boryspil Raion
- Hromada: Pereiaslav urban hromada
- Founded: 907
- Magdeburg rights: 1585

Area
  - Total: 32 km^{2} (12 sq mi)

Population (2022)
  - Total: 26,273
  - Density: 820/km^{2} (2,100/sq mi)
- Time zone: UTC+2 (EET)
  - Summer (DST): UTC+3 (EEST)
- Zip code: 08400–08409
- Area code: +380 4567

Pereiaslav (Note: See §Etymology for former and native names) is a historical city in Boryspil Raion, Kyiv Oblast, central Ukraine. It is located near the confluence of the Alta and Trubizh rivers some 95 km (59.03 mi) southeast of the capital Kyiv. It was one of the key regional centers of power during the Middle Ages and served as the capital of a principality. Pereiaslav hosts the administration of Pereiaslav urban hromada, one of the hromadas of Ukraine. Its population is approximately 26,273 (2022 estimate).

Possessing more than 20 museums, Pereiaslav is often described as a "living museum", and was granted the status of Historical and Ethnographic Reserve.

== Etymology ==
=== Current name ===
The current name is implemented by the Verkhovna Rada on 30 September 2019 to reinstate its historical name.

The name of Pereiaslav in other languages are:

- Ukrainian: Переяслав, IPA: [pereˈjɑslɐu̯] (also rendered as Pereyaslav)
- Yiddish: פּרעיאַסלעוו, romanized: Preyaslev
- Russian: Переяслав, romanized: Pereyaslav
- Latin: Pereaslavia
- Polish: Perejasław
- Lithuanian: Perejaslavas

=== Former names ===
- Pereiaslavl (Note: Ukrainian: Переяславль (also rendered as Pereyaslavl); Russian: Переяславль, romanized: Pereyaslavl) (907–1943; also known as Pereiaslav-Ruskyi (Note: Ukrainian: Переяслав-Руський (also rendered as Pereyaslav-Ruskyy)) starting from 1152)
- Pereiaslav-Khmelnytskyi (Note: Ukrainian: Переяслав-Хмельницький (also rendered as Pereyaslav-Khmelnytskyy); Russian: Переяслав-Хмельницкий, romanized: Pereyaslav-Khmelnitsky) (1943–2019), 1943 – 29 October 2019

In 1152, Yuri Dolgorukiy founded the city of Pereslavl-Zalessky in the north-east of Kievan Rus. To distinguish the two cities, Pereiaslav was sometimes called Pereiaslav-Ruskyi in the 12th and 13th centuries. It is also known as Pereyaslavl-Yuzhnyy (Russian: Переяславль-Южный, lit. 'Pereyaslavl-Southern').

== History ==
=== Kievan Rus' ===
Pereiaslav played a significant role in the region's history. It was mentioned for the first time in the text of a 911 treaty with the Byzantine Empire, where it was mentioned as Pereyaslav-Ruskyi to distinguish it from Preslav in Bulgaria and later with newly established cities in Zalesye including Pereslavl-Zalessky and Pereyaslavl-Ryazansky.

Vladimir I (Volodymyr I), the grand prince of Kiev, built a large fortress in 992 to protect the southern limits of Kievan Rus' from raids of nomads from the steppes of what is now southern Ukraine. The city was the capital of the Principality of Pereyaslavl from the mid-11th century until its demolition by the Tatars in 1239, during the Mongol invasions.

=== Lithuania and Poland ===
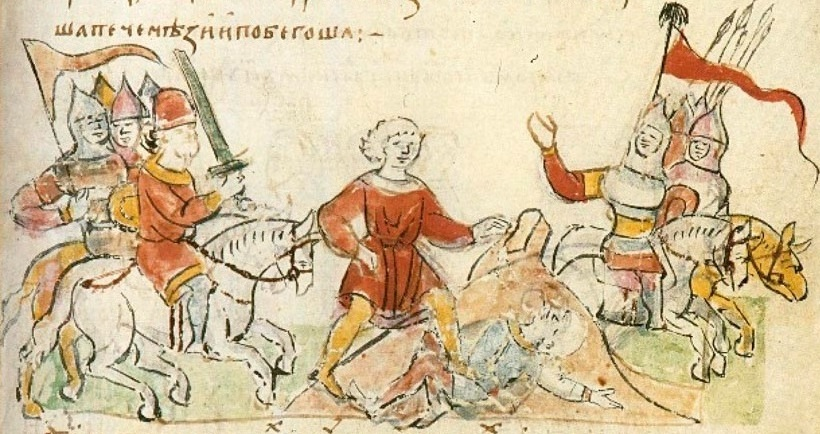
The victory of Nikita the Tanner over the Pechenegs from the Radziwiłł Chronicle

During the 14th century, Pereiaslav was annexed by the Grand Duchy of Lithuania. Since, it was part of the Kiev Voivodeship, which in 1569 became part of the Crown of the Kingdom of Poland. In 1585, Polish King Stephen Báthory granted Perejasław Magdeburg city rights. It was a royal city of Poland.

=== Cossack Hetmanate ===
Coat of arms of Pereiaslav adopted in 1620

During the second half of the 16th century, Pereiaslav became a regimental city of the Zaporozhian Host. Here in 1654 Bohdan Khmelnytskyi had the "Pereiaslav Convent", where the Zaporozhian Cossacks had voted for a military alliance with the Tsardom of Russia and accepted the Pereiaslav Agreement, bringing their lands under Russian rule. The treaty resulted in the establishment of the Cossack Hetmanate in left-bank Ukraine subject to the Tsardom of Russia, and later to the Russo-Polish War (1654-1667). The town was known as Pereiaslav at that time, and later as Pereiaslav-Poltavskyi. According to the Truce of Andrusovo in 1667, Pereiaslav became part of Russia.

=== Soviet museum center ===
During World War II (part of which is known as the Great Patriotic War in USSR and Russia), the Soviet government, keen to glorify the Treaty of Pereiaslav as the ground for Ukraine's unification with Russia, renamed Pereiaslav to Pereiaslav-Khmelnytskyi in October 1943 to stress Bohdan Khmelnytskyi's role of that event. Later, the otherwise obscure town was established, as a dedicated museum and tourism center. By the request of the Pereiaslav-Khmelnytskyi City Council, the Ukrainian parliament reinstated the city to its historic name Pereiaslav in October 2019.

Until 18 July 2020, Pereiaslav was incorporated as a city of oblast significance and served as the administrative center of Pereiaslav-Khmelnytskyi Raion, even though it did not belong to the raion. In July 2020, as part of the administrative reform of Ukraine, which reduced the number of raions of Kyiv Oblast to seven, the city of Pereiaslav was merged into Boryspil Raion.

== Population ==
=== Ethnic groups ===
Distribution of the population by ethnicity according to the 2001 census:

Ethnic groups in Pereiaslav
	percent
Ukrainians	94.95%
Russians	3.91%
Belarusians	0.41%
Armenians	0.18%
Poles	0.08%
Moldovans	0.07%
Azerbaijanis	0.05%
Jews	0.05%

=== Language ===
Distribution of the population by native language according to the 2001 census:

Language	Percentage
Ukrainian	95.89%
Russian	3.61%
other/undecided	0.5%

=== Jewish community ===
The first mention of the Jewish community of Pereiaslav dates to 1620, when the townspeople complained to King Sigismund of the growing number and influence of Jews in Pereiaslav. Denying Jews the right to keep breweries, malt-houses and distilleries, having already prohibited them to engage in farming, the King ordered his commissioners to consider the other rights of Jews. Three years later, an agreement was signed allowing the Jews to enjoy all of the rights and liberties of urban citizens. This agreement was confirmed by King Sigismund.

Pereiaslav Jews were among the first to be killed during the first Khmelnytskyi uprising. Chronicler Nathan Hannover writes, "And a lot of holy communities, based not far from the place of battle and unable to flee, like the holy communities of Pereiaslav, Baryshivka, Pyryatin, Borispil, Lubny, Lokhvitsa and the surrounding communities, died as martyrs of various cruel and heinous kinds of slaughter..." («Yeven metsula», p. 94). Another chronicler, Rabbi Meir of Schebrzheschina, provides a detailed story: «The sacred community of Pereiaslav had drunk from the cup of bitterness several times; perplexed Jews fled to the sacred community of Borisovka (NB. probably Baryshivka). But the rebels also came there and slaughtered many Jews including infants. The local non-Jews pitied those who survived and brought them back to Pereiaslav, where they remained locked up like prisoners in their homes, because they were afraid to be seen by the rebels. At night, they did not know what the morning would bring, and in the morning, what the evening promised».

Famous Yiddish author Sholom Aleichem was born in Pereiaslav in 1859. He spent his childhood in the town of Voronkiv, but when the family became impoverished, he returned to Pereiaslav, where he studied at the Russian gymnasium until 1876. In 1879, he again returned to Pereiaslav for several years. The town is described in detail in his autobiographical prose. In the town's 'ethnographic reserve,' there is a museum dedicated to him.

After the 1654 Pereiaslav Council, the remnants of the Pereiaslav Jewish community became patronized by Russia. The left-bank Jews were allowed to stay in their homes, but the townspeople of Pereiaslav presented to Tsar Alexei Mikhailovich the law of 1620 limiting the rights of Jews, which was confirmed by the Tsar. Information about Pereiaslav Jews disappears from the same year 1654.

A new community developed during the late 18th century. According to the tax books of 1801, there were 5 Christian merchants, no Jewish merchants; 844 Christian townspeople and 66 Jewish townspeople. According to the audit of 1847, there was only one "Pereiaslavskoe" Jewish community in the district, consisting of 1,519 people. According to the census of 1897, there were 185,000 inhabitants in the district, among them 9,857 Jews, including in Pereiaslav — 14,614 residents, of whom 5,754 were Jews. In 1910, three Jewish schools operated in Pereiaslav: first grade primary boys school, a private boys school, and a Talmud-Torah. At the end of the 19th century, the synagogue was built, it survived the war and has been preserved until now – the factory of woven products named after B. Khmelnitsky is operating there.

On 30 June – 2 July 1881 there was a pogrom against the Jews in Pereiaslav. Among the victims were Jews who had fled here after the Kyiv pogrom. From Pereiaslav, the unrest spread to the surrounding areas. In June 1919, Ataman Zeleniy arranged a pogrom in Pereiaslav, and 20 people were killed. By 1921, a Jewish 'self-defense' organisation had been founded in Pereiaslav. In 1926, the Jewish community was flourishing despite the persecution and there were 3,590 Jews in Pereiaslav. At this time, there were 8 houses of study (batei midrash), 3 different Jewish schools, and 26 kosher butchers. During autumn 1941, on the outskirts of the city (the present territory of the Altitsky cemetery), 800 Jewish residents of Pereiaslav were shot. According to elderly residents, the exact date of the shooting was 4–5 November, however, the memorial plate indicates a different date 6–8 October. On 19 May 1943, after a raid, 7 more Jewish women and 1 man were shot, and buried in the Altitsky cemetery.

The current Jewish population of Pereiaslav numbers fewer than 100. The community office is located in the building of the former synagogue.

== Economy ==
There is a major river port in the city, working as part of Kyiv River Port.

== Education ==
=== Universities ===
Established in 1986 as a Pereiaslav-Khmelnytskyi branch of the Kyiv State Pedagogical Institute, HSUP continued the ancient educational traditions of Pereiaslav.

The roots of the University go back to the first half of the 18th century, namely, to 2.10.1738, when a collegium was founded in Pereiaslav. In 1808, after the reform of religious education institutions, Pereiaslav Collegium was reorganized into a seminary, which continued the educational traditions of the region, including teacher training. By the Resolution of the Cabinet of Ministers of Ukraine No. 949 of 24 November 1993, Pereiaslav-Khmelnytskyi State Pedagogical Institute was established on the basis of the Pereiaslav-Khmelnytskyi branch of the Drahomanov Ukrainian State Pedagogical University, named after H. S. Skovoroda in 1994 and recognized as accredited at the III level of accreditation by the decision of the State Accreditation Commission in 2000.

In 2002 by a decree of the Cabinet of Ministers of Ukraine Pereiaslav-Khmelnytskyi Hryhorii Skovoroda State Pedagogical University was established on the basis of the Institute.

In 2004 and 2010, University was accredited at the IV level, in 2005 it was renamed to SHEI "Pereiaslav-Khmelnytskyi Hryhorii Skovoroda State Pedagogical University", and on 14 July 2021, due to the previous renaming of the city and in order to simplify the name of the institution in the established European tradition of naming higher education institutions, it received a new official name – Hryhorii Skovoroda University in Pereiaslav.

== Landmarks ==
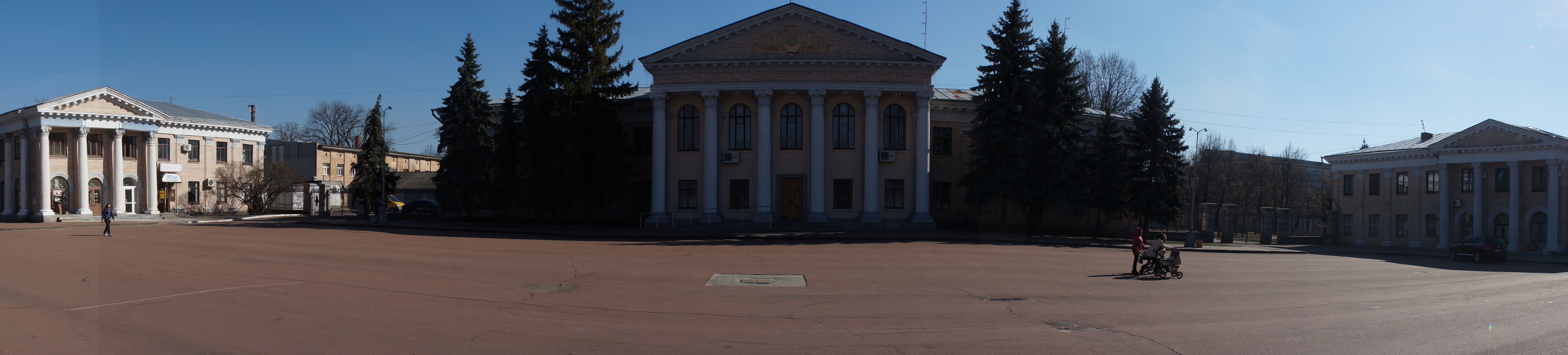
Bohdan Khmelnytsky square in Pereiaslav

The most significant landmarks of Pereiaslav are:

- Museum of Folk Architecture and Household Traditions in Middle Dnieper Ukraine, presenting the architecture and traditions of Ukrainians from ancient times until the 19th century, which includes submuseums: Museum of Bread, Museum of Land Transportation, Museum of Rushnyks (Ukrainian Decorative Towels), Museum of Space Exploration, Museum of Postal Services, Museum of Beekeeping, Museum of Applied and Decorative Arts, Museum of Ukrainian Traditional Rituals, Museum of Archeology, Museum of the Cossack Glory, Museum of Trypillya Culture, Museum of Ukrainian Traditional Dress, etc.
- Excavated ruins of buildings from the 10–11th centuries.
- St. Michael's Church (1646–66).
- Ascension Monastery (with the Cathedral built in 1695–1700).

== International relations ==
=== Twin towns – Sister cities ===
Pereiaslav is twinned with:

- Mariupol, Ukraine
- (Georgia (country)) Mtskheta, Georgia
- Paide, Estonia
- Kočani, North Macedonia

== Notable people ==
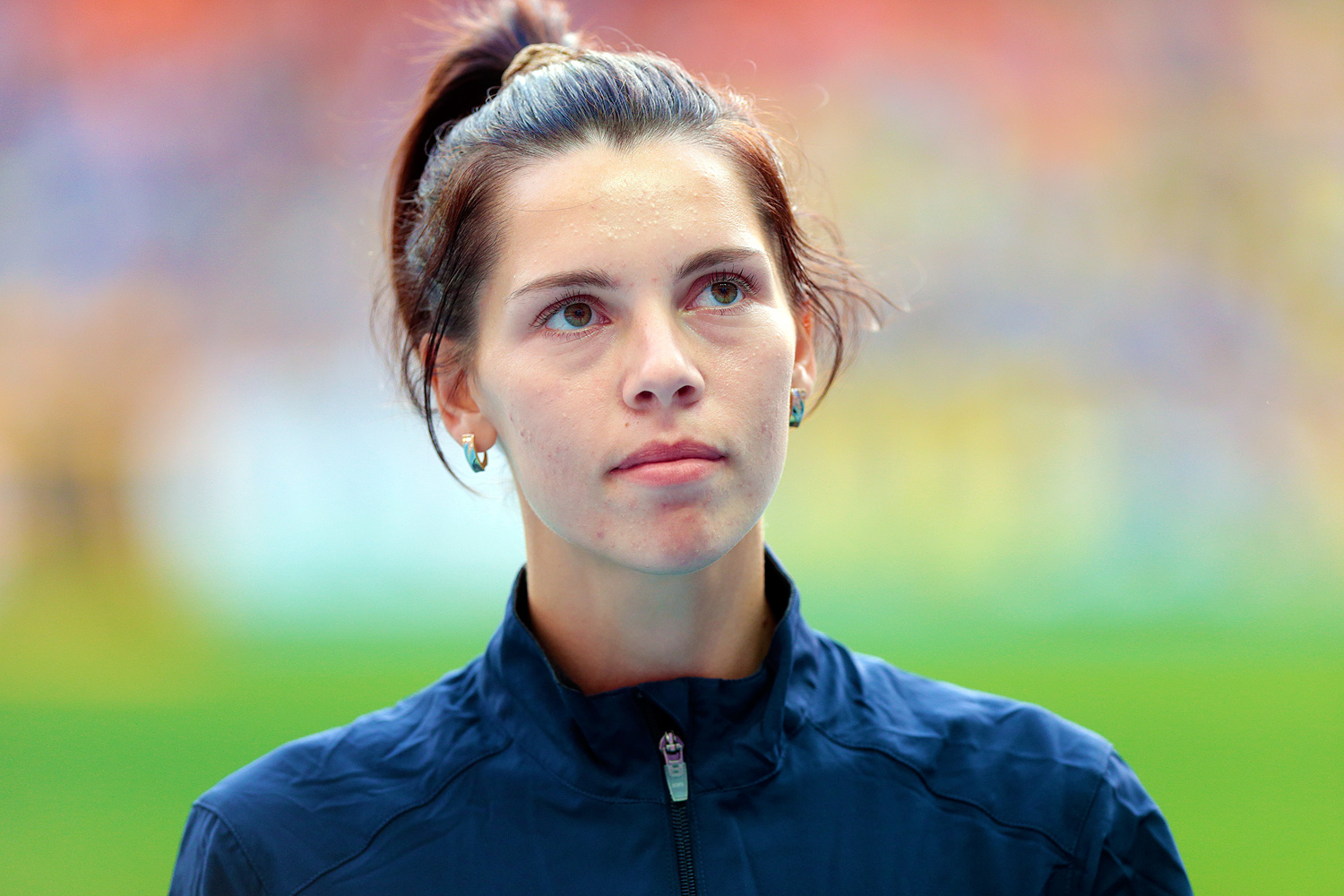
Hanna Knyazyeva-Minenko

- Pavlo Teteria (1620s–1670), Ukrainian Hetman
- Oleh Babyshkin (1918-1991), Ukrainian literary scholar and art historian, Doctor of Philology
- Sholem Aleichem (1859–1916), Jewish-Ukrainian Yiddish writer and playwright
- Meir Blinken (1879–1915), Jewish-American writer
- Lyudmyla Mekh (born 1951), Ukrainian journalist
- Petro Kholodnyi (1875–1930), Ukrainian statesman, public figure, member of the Ukrainian Central Rada, Minister of Public Education of the Ukrainian People's Republic, artist and chemist.
- Hanna Knyazyeva-Minenko (born 1989), Ukrainian and Israeli triple jumper and long jumper
- Louise Nevelson (1899–1988), American sculptor

== Gallery ==
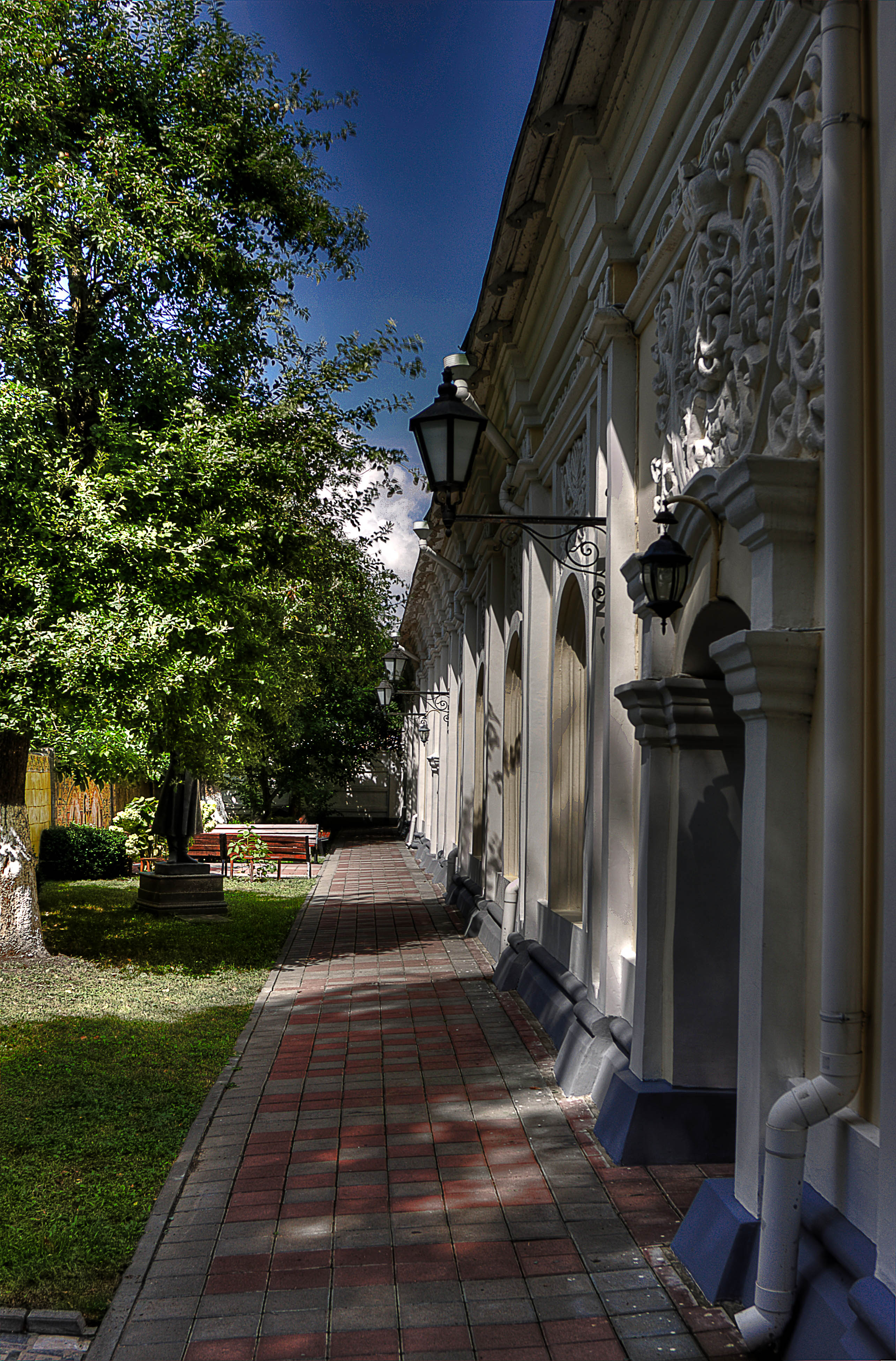
Collegium

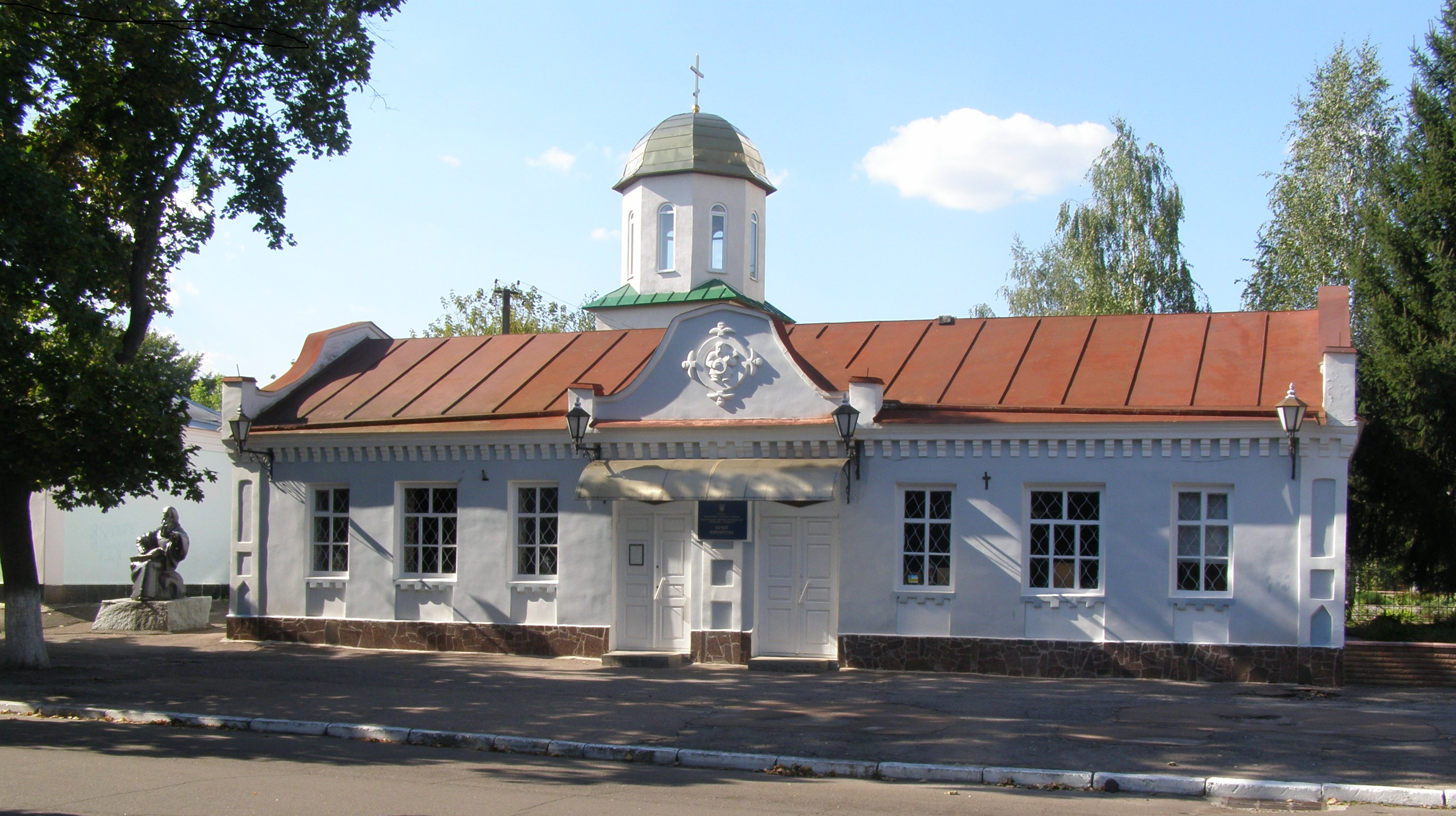
Museum of kobzar craft

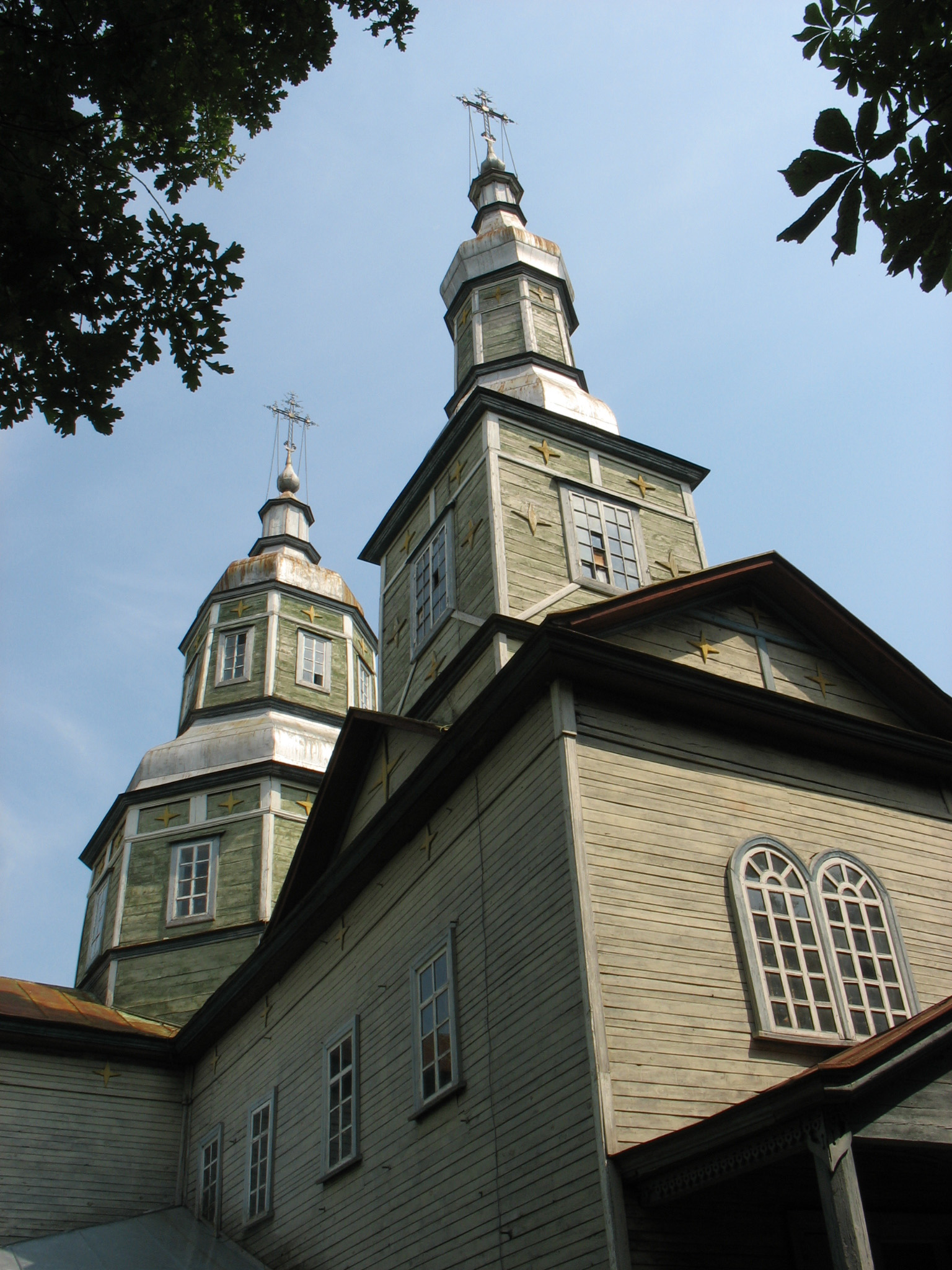
Church of St. George

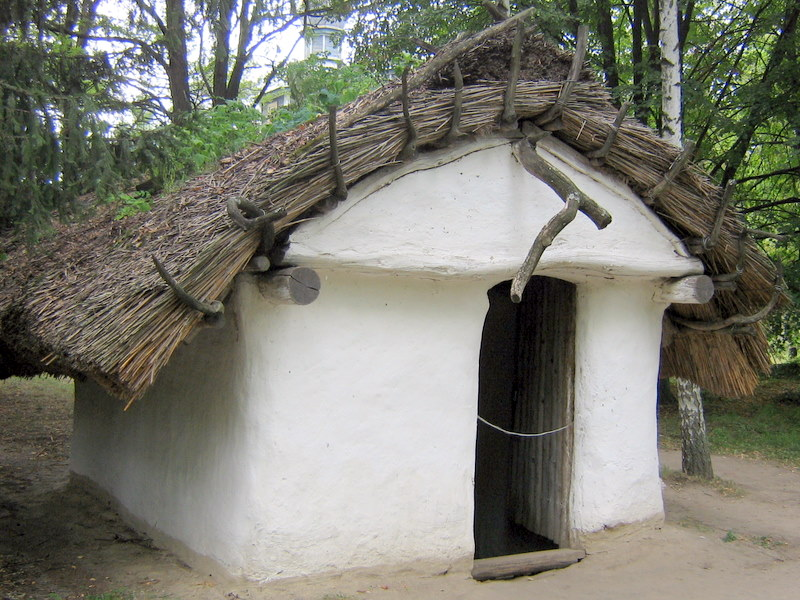
Replica of an 11th-century Kievan Rus' house in the Museum of Folk Architecture and Household Traditions

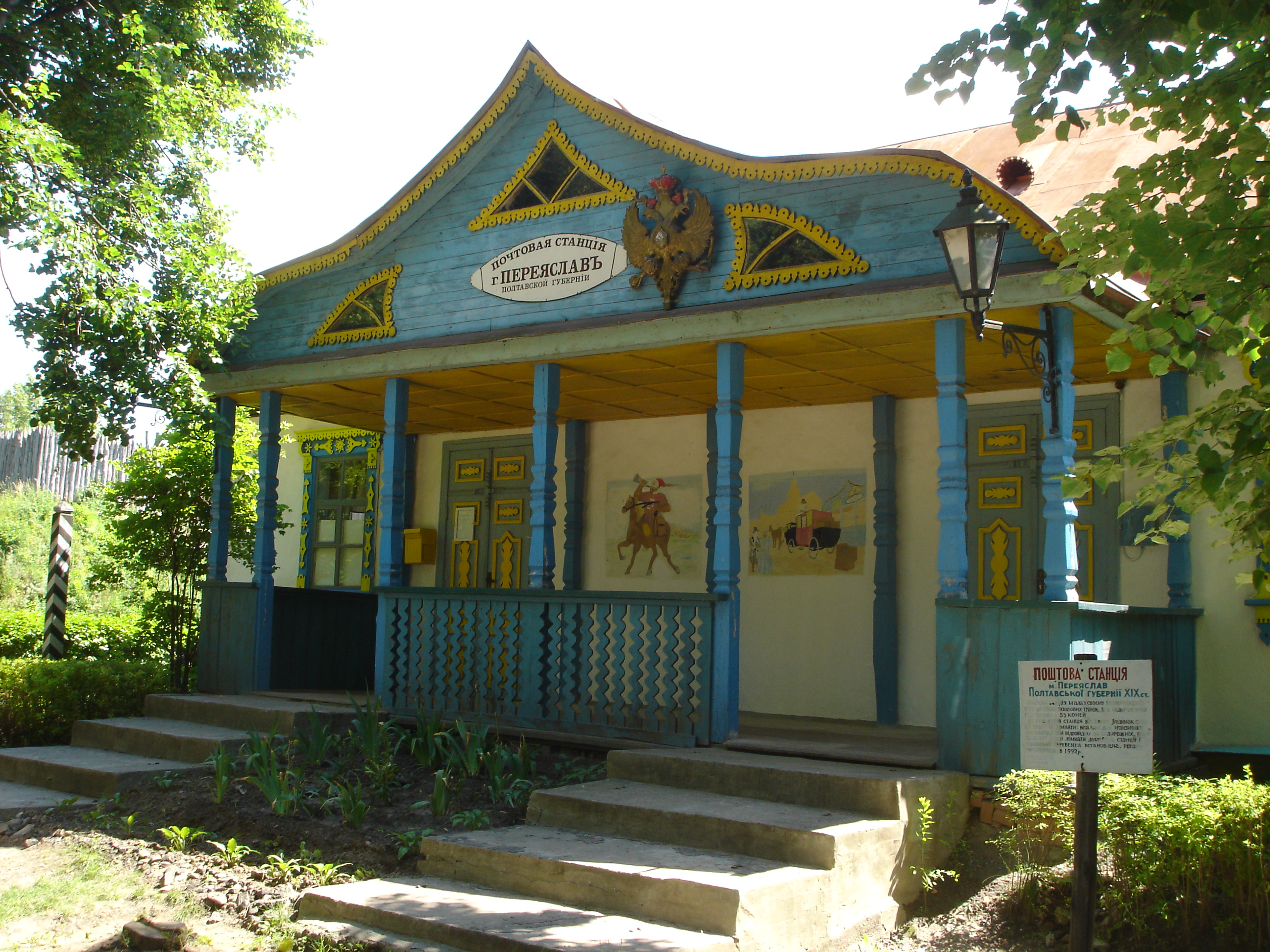
An old post office in the Museum of Folk Architecture and Household Traditions

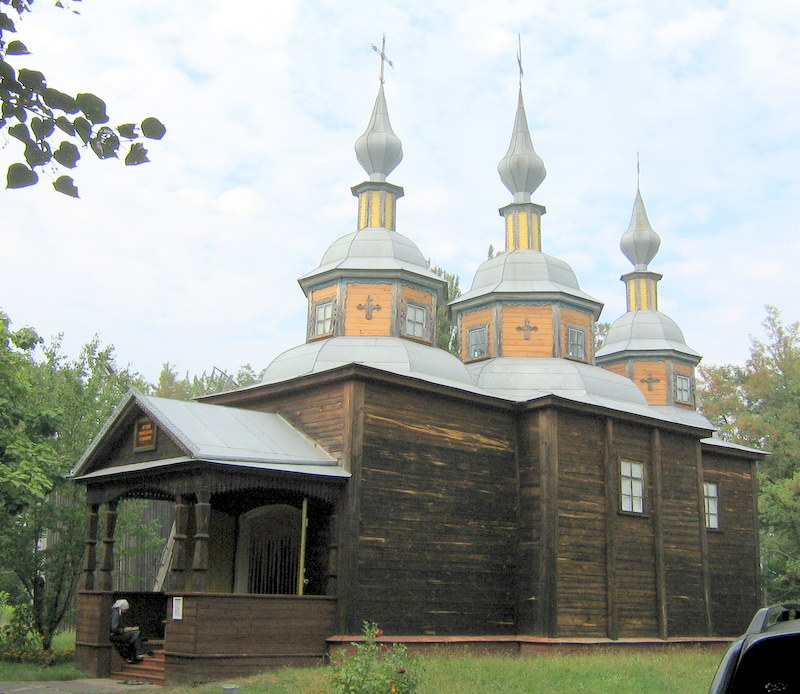
The Rushnyk Museum, in the Museum of Folk Architecture and Household Traditions

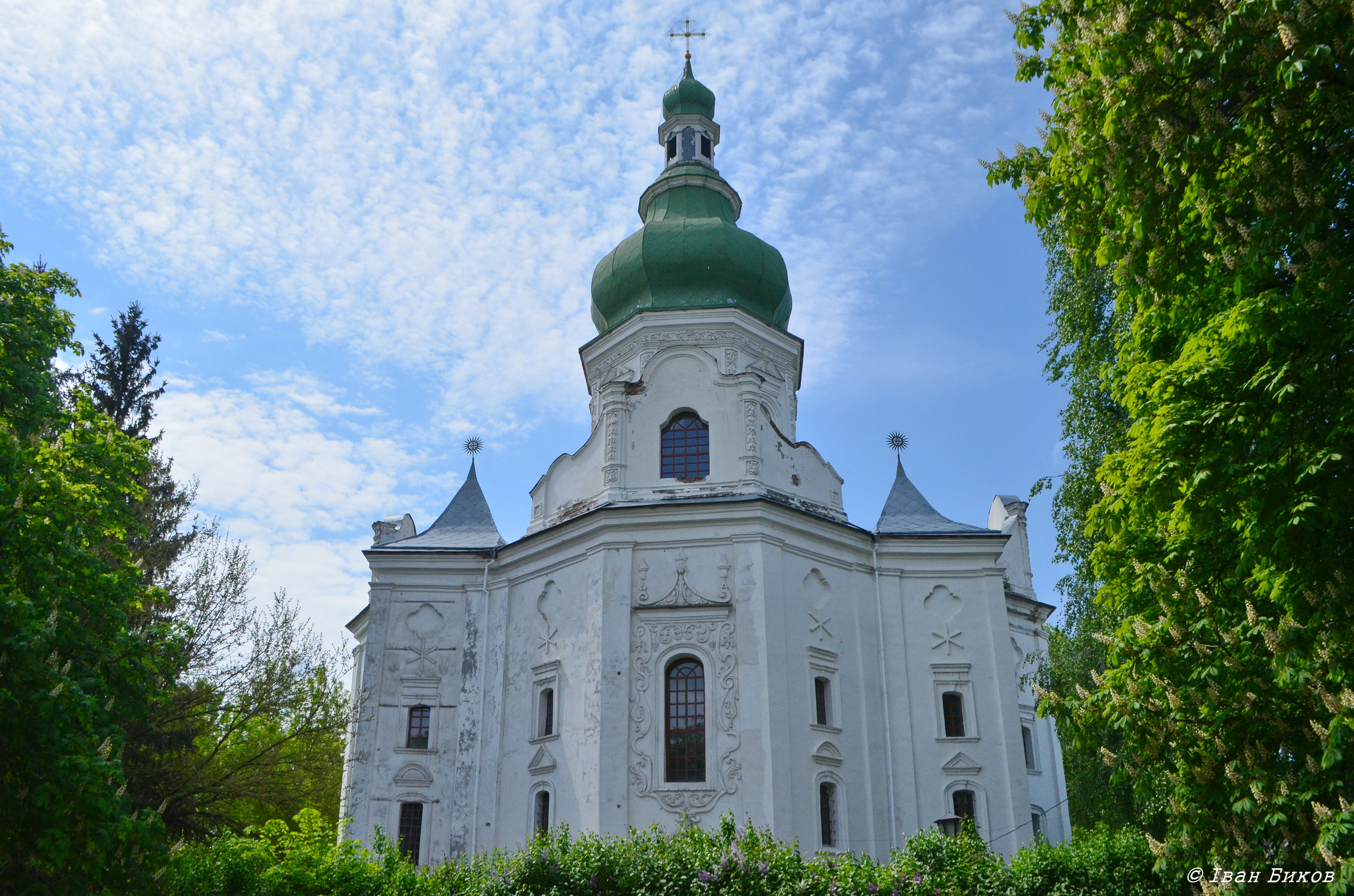
Ascension Cathedral

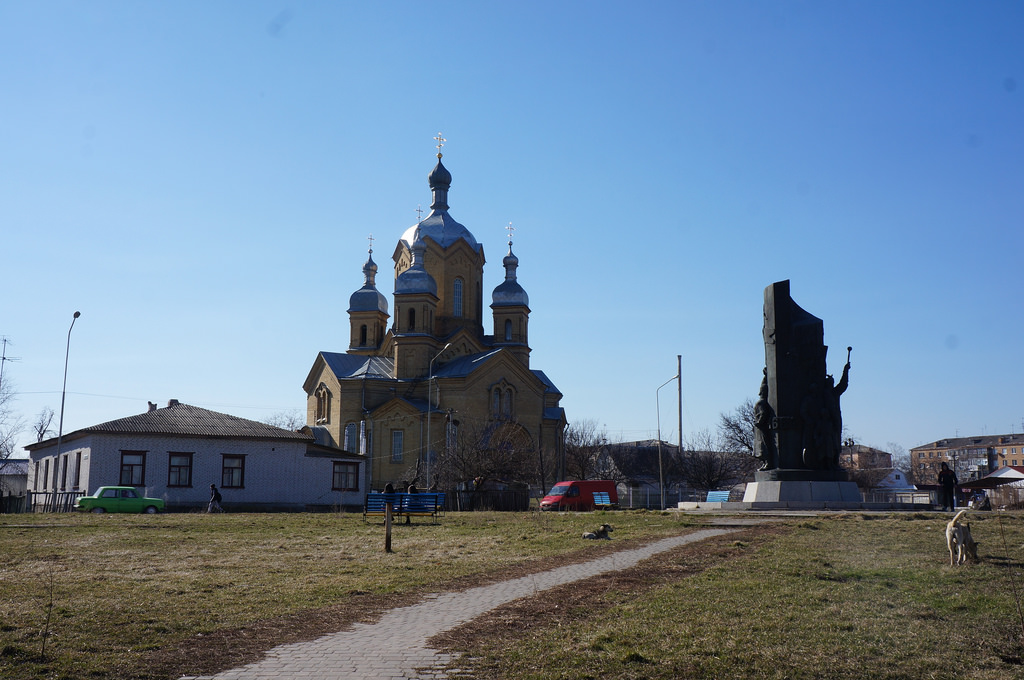
A church in the Old Town of Pereiaslav

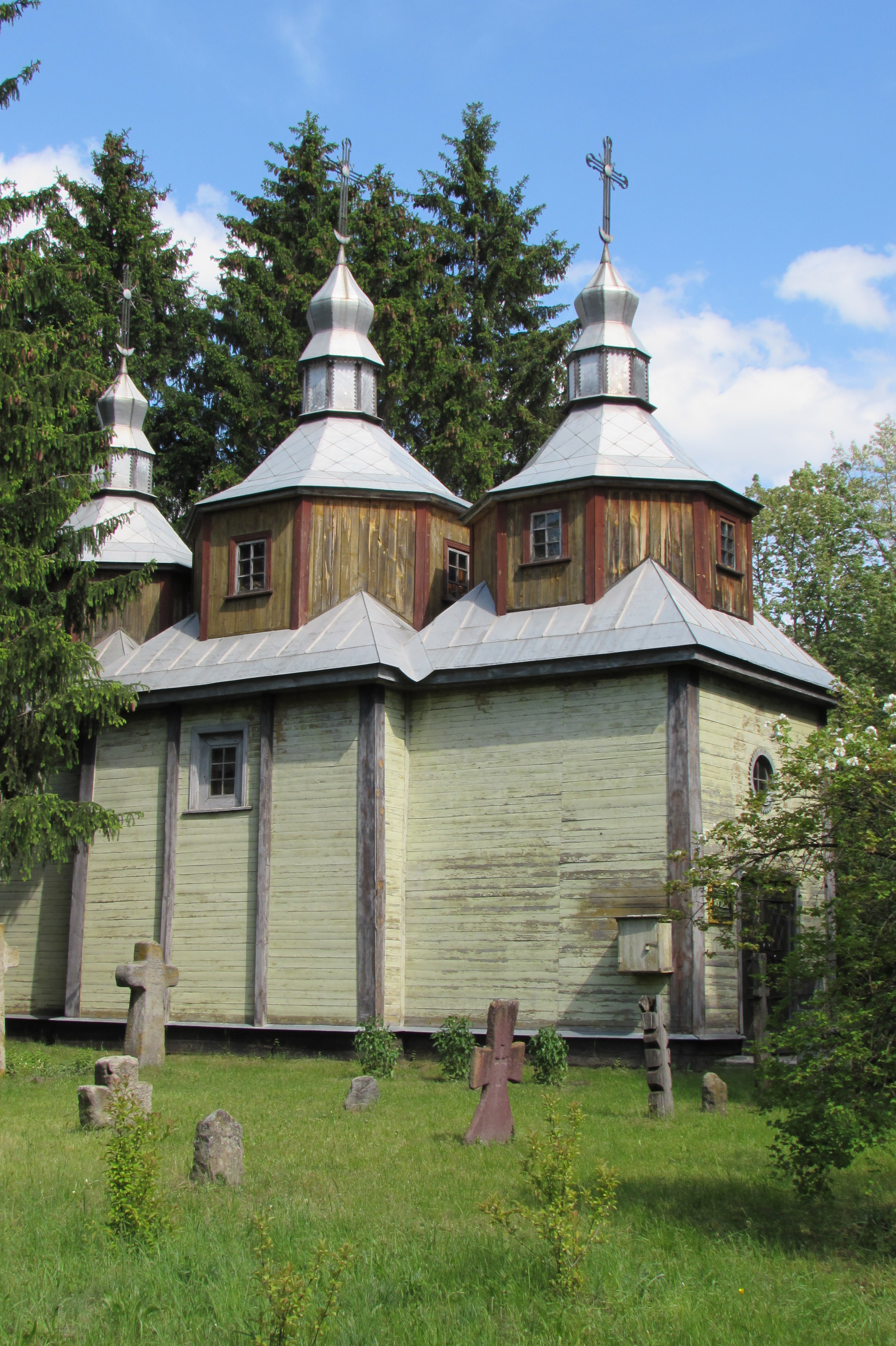
Church of the Intercession
