= Pereiaslav River Port =

- Native name: Переяславський річковий порт

Location
- Country: Ukraine
- Location: 08412, Kyiv Oblast, Pereiaslav-Khmelnytskyi Raion, Village of Chyrs'ke, Embankment Street, 1

Statistics
- Website www.nibulon.com

Pereiaslav River Port is an enterprise in the field of river transport. It is located on the Dnipro in Pereiaslav on the banks of the Kaniv Reservoir. It is a branch of the Kyiv River Port.

== History ==
Pereiaslav-Khmelnytsky River Port, operates, although not in large quantities. Decisive for it was the decision of Prime Minister Volodymyr Groysman to use the port as the main transshipment point for agricultural products for further transportation to the final destination by road. This decision caused great resonance. But as comical as it may sound, this was the first shipment of melons in the last 14 years. In November 2020, for the first time in a long time, it received international cargo from Bulgaria.

== Production capacity ==
- Bolver berth 105 m long
- Total area of the site - 2 hectares
- Length of the berth wall is 145 m, the depth is 3.5 m

== See also ==
- Kyiv River Port
- Rzhyshchiv River Port
- Cargo turnover of Ukrainian ports
