= Velykyi Bukryn =

Rural locality in Kyiv Oblast, Ukraine

Velykyi Bukryn Великий Букрин
- Village-type settlement
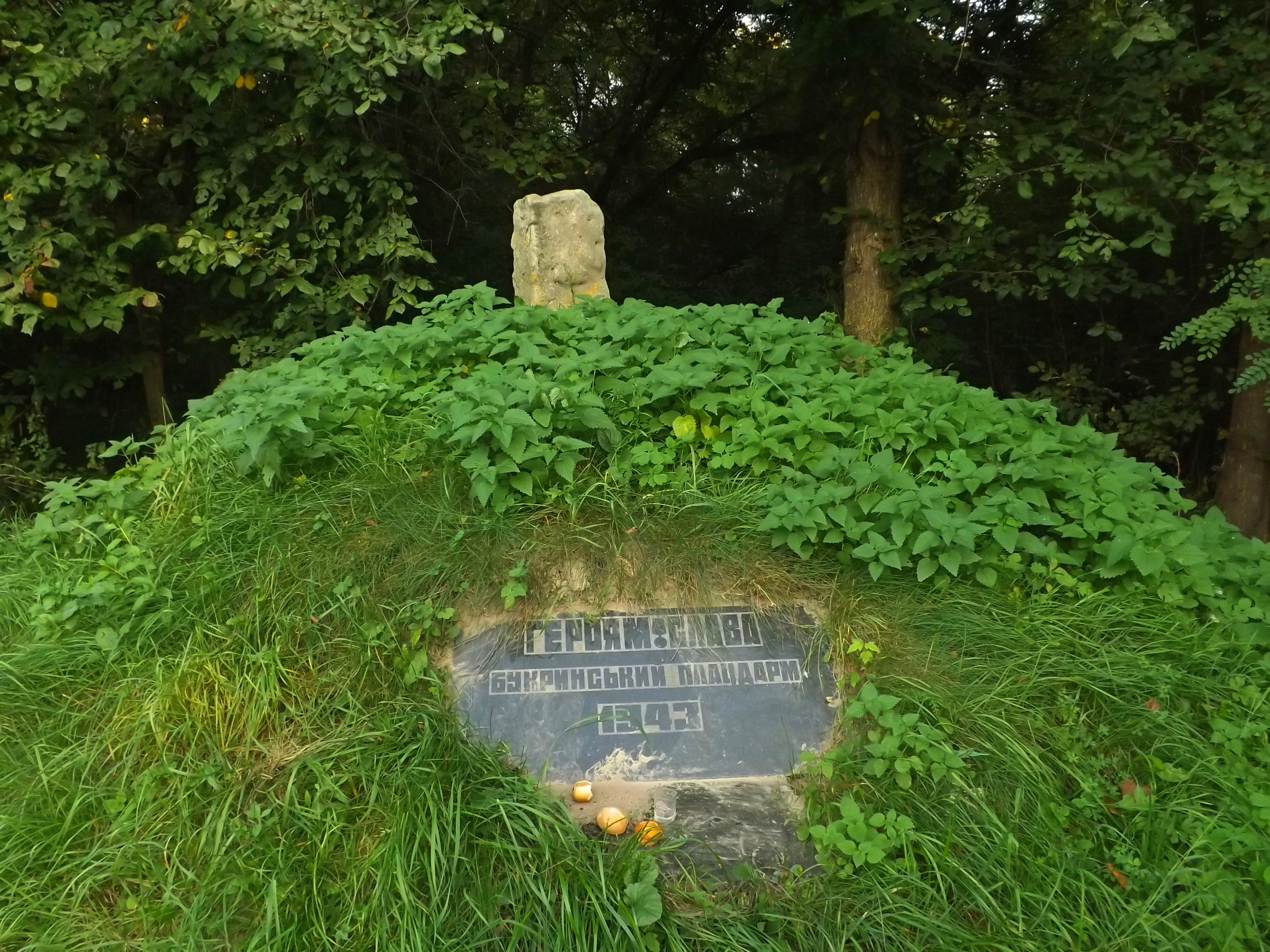
- Second World War memorial in Velykyi Bukryn

- Location within Ukraine Location within Kyiv Oblast
- Coordinates: 49°56′50″N 31°18′57″E
- Country: Ukraine
- Oblast: Kyiv Oblast
- Raion: Obukhiv Raion

Population (2001)
  - Total: 102
- Postal code: 08810
- Area code: +380 4574
- Website: https://rada.info/rada/04362591/

Velykyi Bukryn (Ukrainian: Великий Букрин; Russian: Великий Букрин) is a village in Obukhiv Raion at the south of Kyiv Oblast, Ukraine, with about 100 inhabitants (2001). It belongs to Rzhyshchiv urban hromada, one of the hromadas of Ukraine.

The village, founded in 1600, belongs administratively to the 39.3 km^{2} district council Malyi Bukryn (Малий Букрин). The village is located on the border with Cherkasy Oblast on a peninsula in the Dnieper, which is dammed up to Kaniv reservoir, 5 km north of Malyi Bukryn community center, about 50 km northeast of the city of Myronivka and about 120 km south of the Ukrainian capital Kyiv.

At Velykyi Bukryn, the troops of the Voronezh Front established the hard-fought over Bukryn bridgehead on the right bank of the Dnieper in the autumn of 1943 during the Battle of the Dnieper. In the neighboring village of Balyko-Shchuchynka, there is the "National Museum-Memorial Bukryn Bridgehead" (Національний музей-меморіальний комплекс «Букринський плацдарм") to commemorate the fighting.

Until 18 July 2020, Velykyi Bukryn belonged to Myronivka Raion. The raion was abolished that day as part of the administrative reform of Ukraine, which reduced the number of raions of Kyiv Oblast to seven. The area of Myronivka Raion was merged into Obukhiv Raion.
