= Museum of Space Exploration =

Coordinates: 50.05973°N 31.4758°E

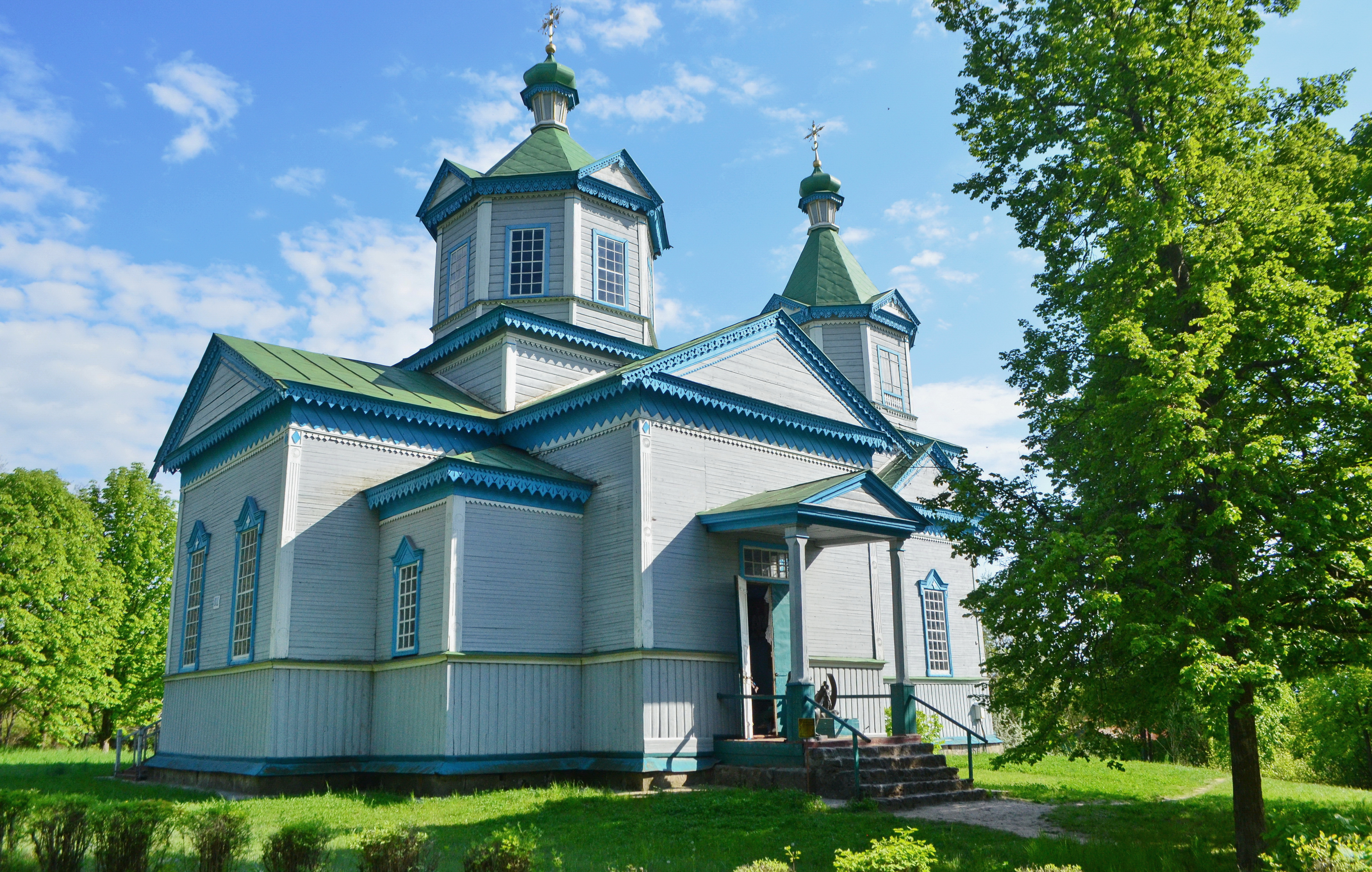
- The church that the museum is located in

Immovable Monument of Local Significance of Ukraine
- Official name: Церква св. Параскеви (Church of St. Paraskeva)
- Type: Architecture, Urban Planning
- Reference no.: 5886-Ко

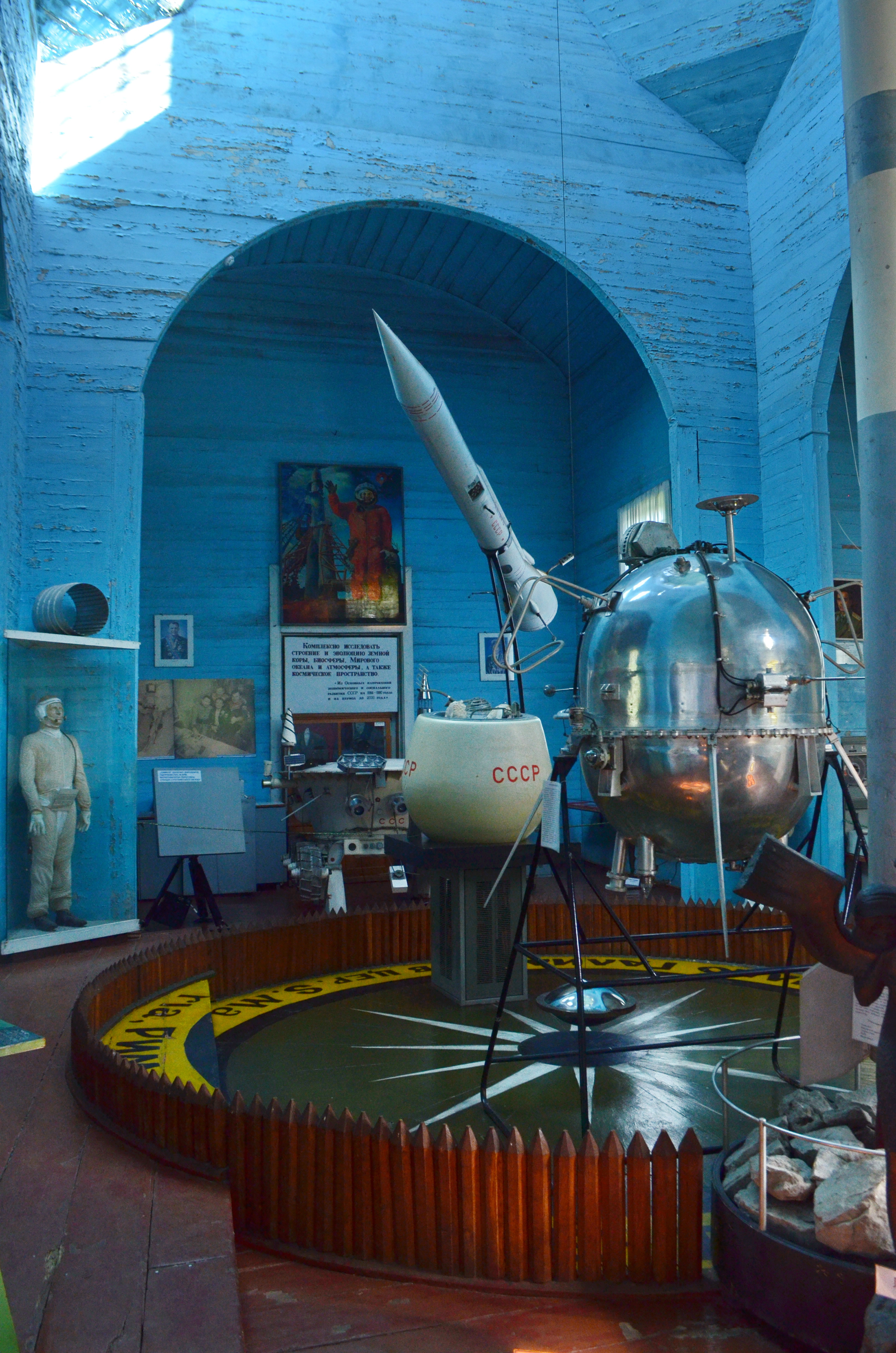
Inside the museum

The Museum of Space Exploration is a museum in Ukraine that is located in a former church. It is one of over 30 museums in the "museum city" of Pereiaslav. The church was originally built in 1891, moved in 1971 when the region it was built in was flooded, and reconstructed in 1973.

== Location ==
The museum is located in the "museum city" of Pereiaslav, Ukraine, where it is one of over 30 museums as part of the "Museum of Folk Architecture and Life of the Middle Dnieper National Historical-Ethnographic Reserve".

== Church ==
The building used for the museum was originally a wooden village church named after Saint Paraskeva. It was originally built in 1891. When the region that the church was originally located in was flooded in 1971, the church was moved and was reconstructed in 1973.

The church has a crucifix layout, with a bell tower made with pine scaffold. It has a porch on three sides; the one on the fourth side was lost when the museum was relocated.

== Museum ==
The museum opened in the hall of the relocated church in 1979. It has memorial rooms that recreate the times of Sergei Korolev and Alexander Ishlinsky, as well as an RD-219 rocket engine, a Minsk-32 computer system, a 10 kilograms (22 lb) Foucault pendulum, Devices used on space vehicles, and an SK-II Space suit from Soyuz 23. It also has displays of photos of the moon passing the Earth, as well as from Mars 5, Mars 6 and Venera 9.
