= Kyiv River Port =

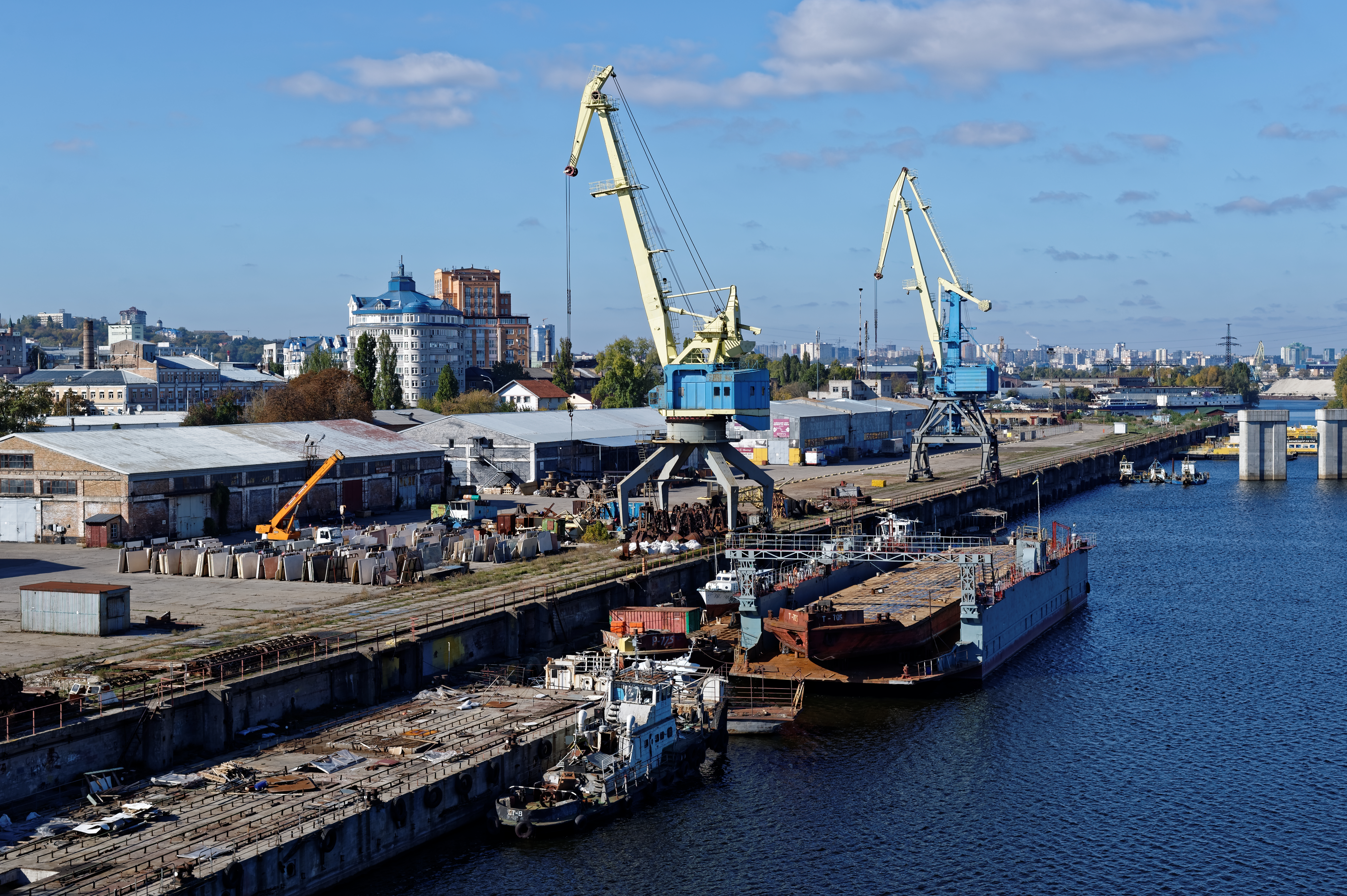

- Location in Ukraine
- Native name: Київський річковий порт

Location
- Country: Ukraine
- Location: Kyiv, Naberezhno-Luhova Street, 2a
- Coordinates: Kyiv 50°27′33″N 30°31′37″E

Details
- Opened: 1897

Statistics
- Website krp.com.ua

The Kyiv River Port (Ukrainian: Київський річковий порт; translit. Kyivskyi richkovyi port) is the main river port of the Ukrainian capital Kyiv, located on the right bank of the Dnieper River in the Podil neighborhood of the city. The port has its own fleet that serves as a shipping company. It also has departments in Pereiaslav and Rzhyshchiv.

The passenger part of the port has been renovated to house American University Kyiv since 2021.

== History ==
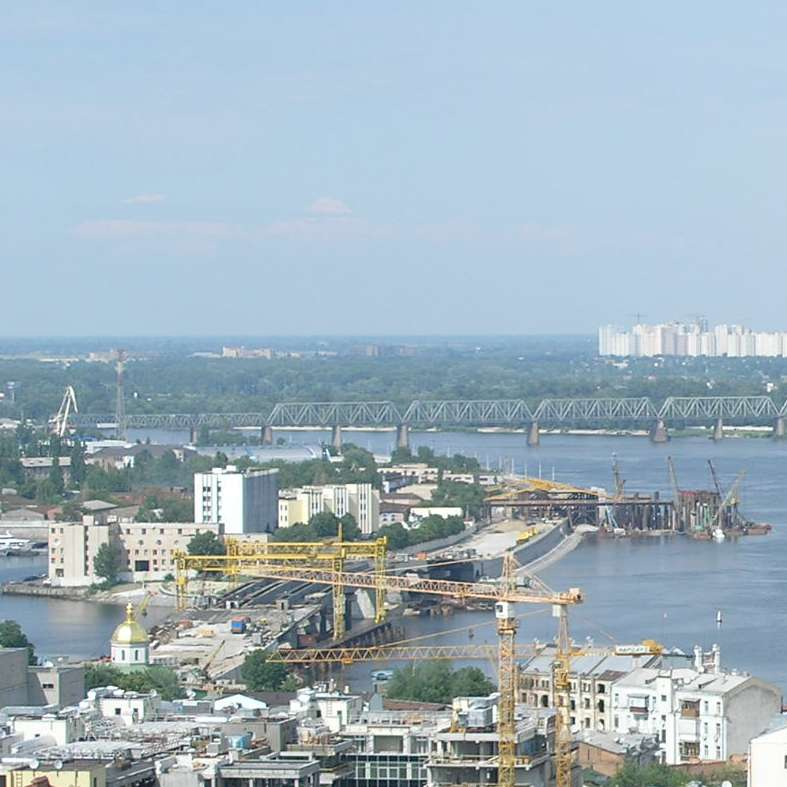
Panoramic view of Podil with Harbor entrance seen.

Since ancient times, the Podil neighborhood was an important trade center, especially by water routes.

Around the 19th century, steamboats started to navigate along the Dnieper, and a row of quays were built along the Right Bank of the river.

== Port infrastructure ==
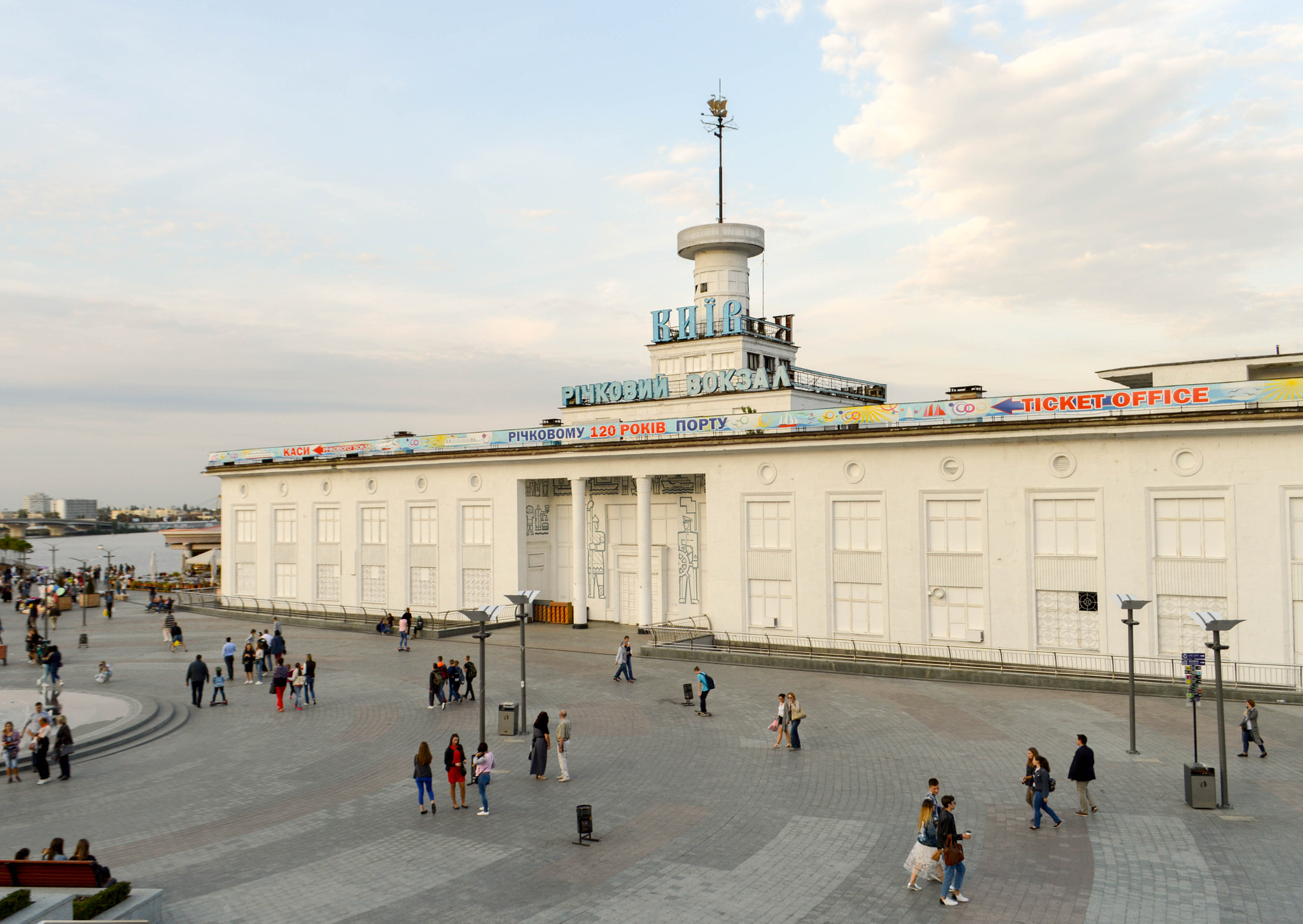
Passenger terminal, 2018

Kyiv River Port boasts more than 20 riverboat stairway-equipped moorings on the several kilometer-long embankment, all of which are reserved for passenger and leisure vessels. From April through October, there is a daily leisure navigation in the port, facilitated by various private operators.

In 1953–1961 a new passenger terminal was built on the Poshtova Square by the architects V. Gopkalo, V. Ladny, and others. The building has a mast-like tower which resembled a steamboat tower.

== Fleet ==
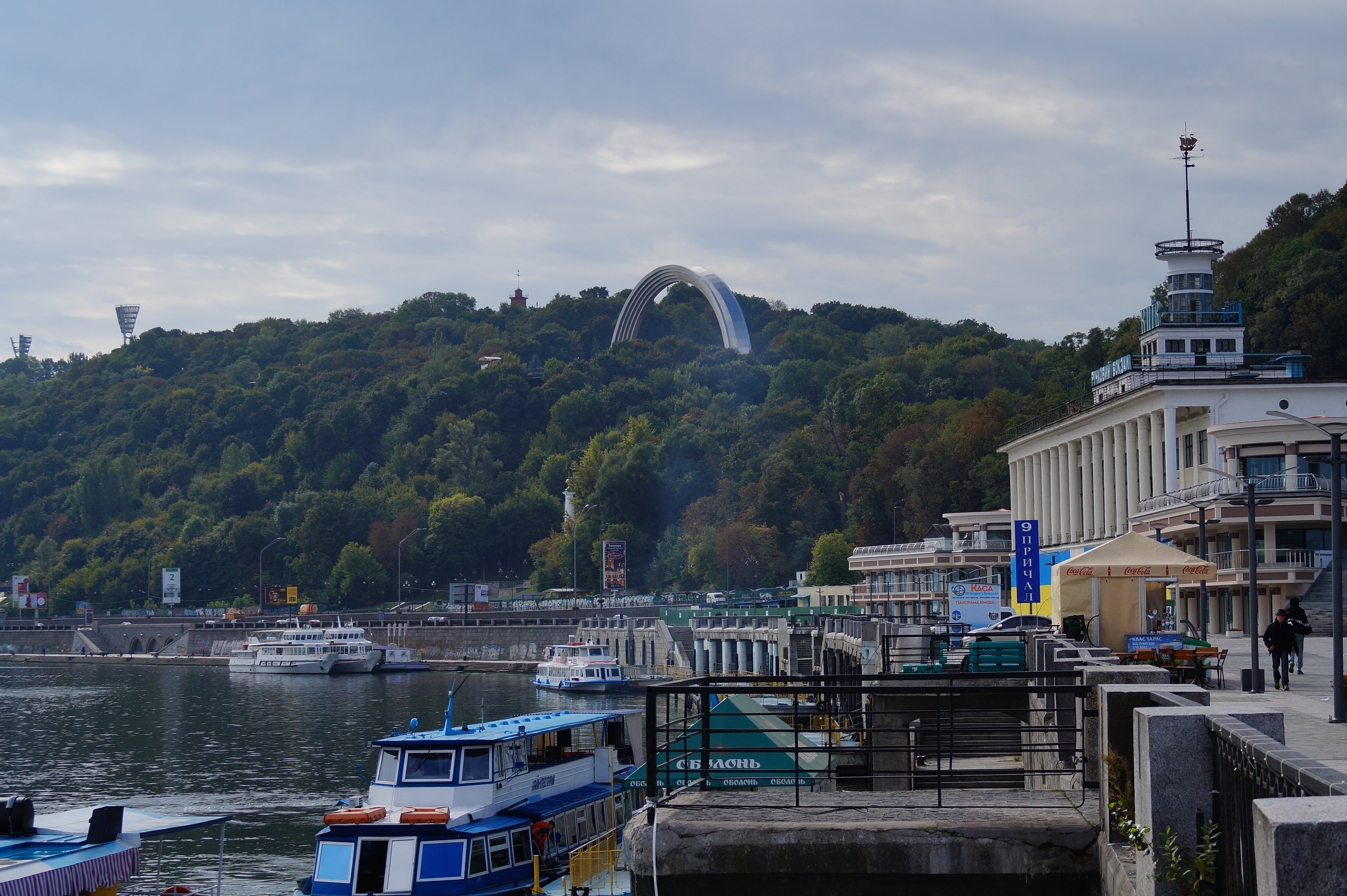
Dnieper Embankment, Kyiv, Naberezhne Shosse, 2015.

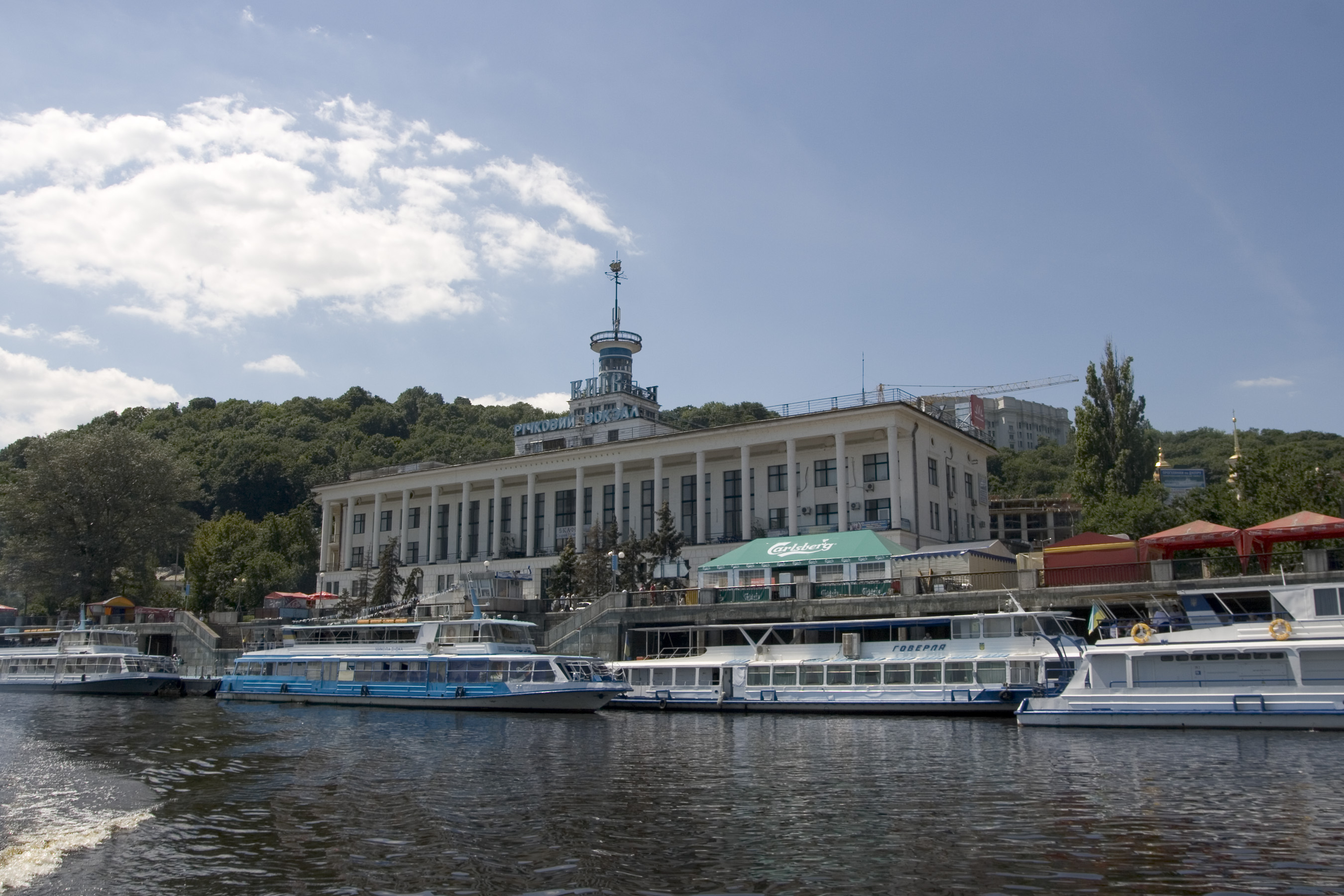
Kyiv River Station, 2008

Passenger

- Moskva-type — 6 (all project R-51E)
- Kashtan-type — 4
- Moskvich-type — 2 (all project 544)
- PS-type — 1 (project 792A)

Freight

- Project 1021A — 1
- TNM-type, project 795 — 1
- Zaporozhie-type, project 559B — 1
- Generic — 2
- Project 775, 775A — 7

Technical

- Type BT, BM — 6
- Floating dock — 1
- Floating piers — 3
- Poliarnik-type, project 1427 — 1
- Type OS, project 354U — 1
- Project 889A — 1
- Project D-120 — 1
- Admiralteets-type, project 371 — 1
- Kostromich-type, project 1606 — 1

== Ownership and operations ==
The port was privatized in 1996 from Ukrrichflot. It is now owned by companies associated with Mykhailo Brodskyi and Nestor Shufrych.

== See also ==
- Kyiv River Station
- Mosaics of Kyiv River Station
- Pereiaslav River Port
- Rzhyshchiv River Port
- Podilskyi Bridge
- Havanskyi Bridge
- Desna (river)
- KDM Shipping
- List of ports in Ukraine
- Transport in Ukraine
