= Rzhyshchiv =

City in Kyiv Oblast, Ukraine

Rzhyshchiv Ржищів
- City
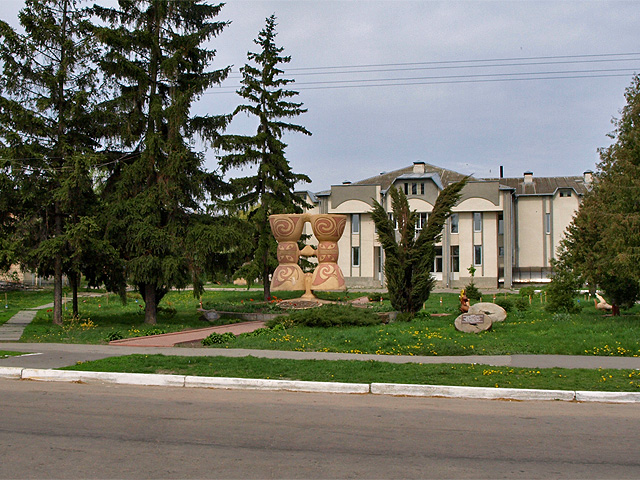
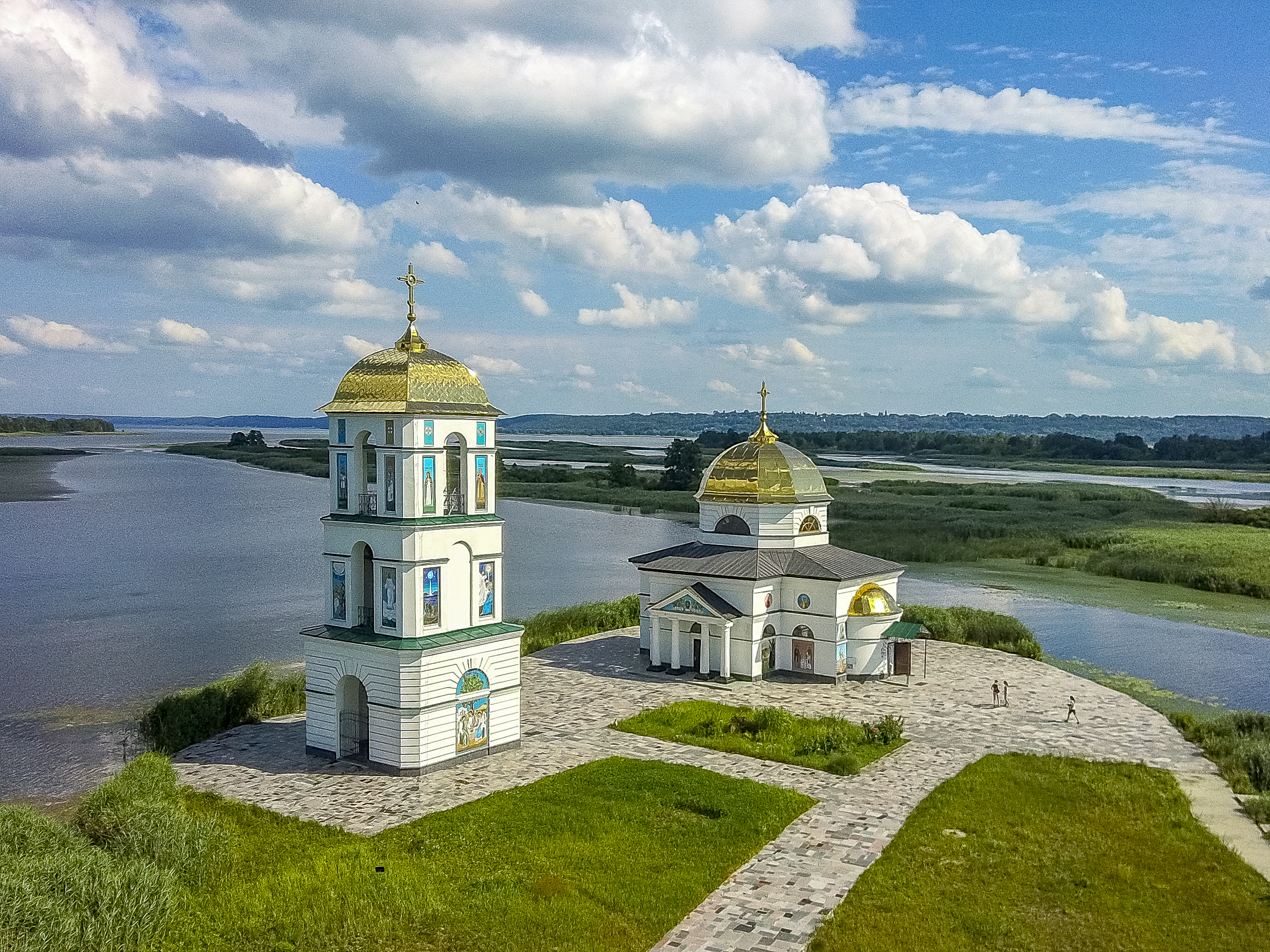
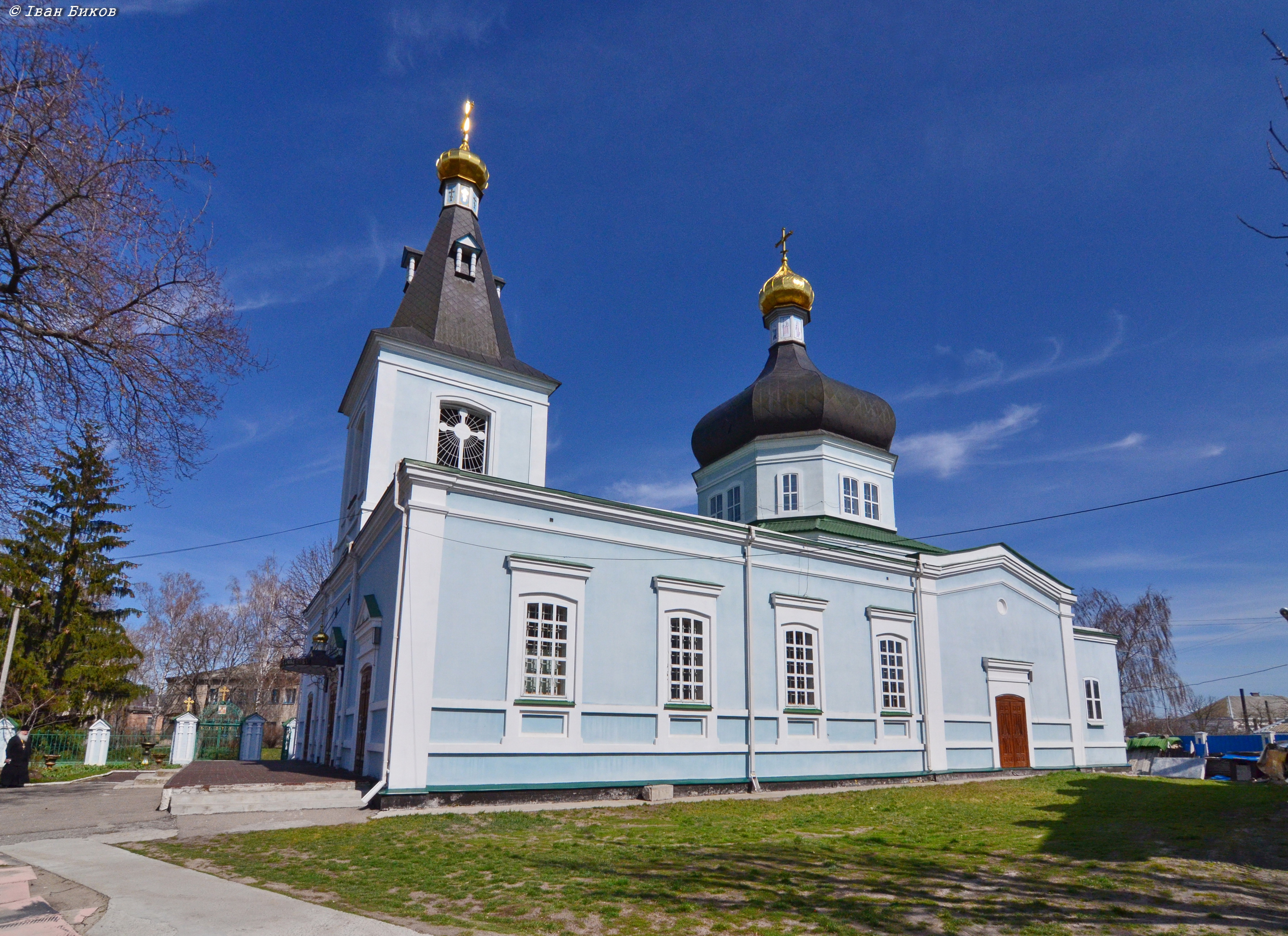
- Top: House of Culture; bottom left: Transfiguration Church; bottom right: Trinity Church

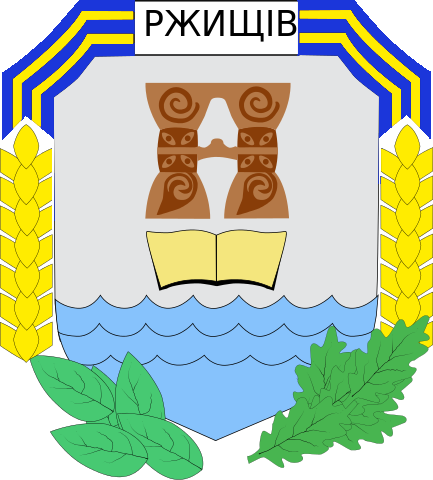
- Flag Coat of arms
- Interactive map of Rzhyshchiv
- Location within Ukraine Location within Kyiv Oblast
- Coordinates: 49°57′40″N 31°02′37″E
- Country: Ukraine
- Oblast: Kyiv Oblast
- Raion: Obukhiv Raion
- Hromada: Rzhyshchiv urban hromada
- Founded: 1151

Area
  - Total: 35.6 km^{2} (13.7 sq mi)

Population (2022)
  - Total: 7,175
  - Density: 202/km^{2} (522/sq mi)
- Time zone: UTC+2 (EET)
  - Summer (DST): UTC+3 (EEST)
- Postal code: 09230
- Area code: +380 4573
- Website: www.rzhyschiv-rada.gov.ua

Rzhyshchiv (Ukrainian: Ржищів, IPA: [ˈrʒɪʃtʃiu̯]; Russian: Ржищев, romanized: Rzhishchev; Yiddish: אירזיסטשוב, romanized: Irzistshub, also known by several alternative names; Polish: Rzyszczów) is a small city in Obukhiv Raion, Kyiv Oblast (province) of Ukraine. It hosts the administration of Rzhyshchiv urban hromada, one of the hromadas of Ukraine. Population: 7,175 (2022 estimate). It is situated on Leglych river.

Until 18 July 2020, Rzhyshchiv was incorporated as a city of oblast significance. In July 2020, as part of the administrative reform of Ukraine, which reduced the number of raions of Kyiv Oblast to seven, the city of Rzhyshchiv was merged into Obukhiv Raion.

== Names ==
In Yiddish, formerly a primary language of the city, the name has been recorded in different forms throughout its history, including אורזיזטשוב (Urziztshub), רזיזטשוב (Rziztshub), אורזיזטשיב (Urziztshib), רזיזטשיב (Rziztshib), אורזישטשב (Urzishtshb), רזישטשב (Rzishtshb), אורזיסטשוב (Urzistshub), רזיסטשוב (Rzistshub), אירזיסטשיב (Irzistshib), רזיסטשיב (Rzistshib), אורזישטשיב (Urzishtshib), רזישטשיב (Rzishtshib), אירזישטשיב (Irzishtshib), רעזישטשיב (Rezishtshib), רזישטשעב (Rzishtsheb), אירזיזטשיב (Irziztshib). In English it has been recorded as Rzhyshchiv, Rzhishchev, Rezhishchev, Rezhyschiv, Rzysciv, Orzistchov and Irzyszczów.

== Economy ==
There is River Port working as a part of Kyiv River Port located in town.

== Jewish community ==
Archival sources report a Jewish community in Rzhyschiv by the end of the 18th century. From 1802 onwards, the town was the centre of a Hasidic dynasty. According to the census of 1847, Rzhyschiv's Jewish community numbered 1,543 people. By 1852 there was a synagogue in Rzhyshchiv. The Jewish area of the town was located behind the market. In his description of Kiev Guberniya, historian L. Pokhilevich writes: “At the beginning of the 20th century, Rzhyschiv occupied a prominent place among the trade centres of Kiev Guberniya, trading particularly in grain sent along the Dnieper River to Lithuania.” In 1858, a large beet-sugar factory owned by Berdichev banker Halperin was built in Rzhyschiv.

According to the census of 1897, Rzhyshchev's population numbered 11,629 inhabitants, of whom 6,008 were Jewish. In 1910, there is evidence of a Jewish school in the town. Rzhyschiv's Jewish community was not only large but also rich, as confirmed by the list of Kiev Oblast's Jewish merchants and manufacturers compiled by Kiev City Duma in 1907. The list included surnames of 150 inhabitants of Rzhyschiv, 47 of whom owned real estate valued at 1,000 roubles or more. These include:

Name	Value of real estate
Lishchinsky family	8,200 roubles
Podraysky Vigdor Nisonov	5,000 roubles
Polissky manufacturing family	4,200 roubles
Skidelsky El Duvid Yankelev	4,000 roubles
Movsha Leybovich Gohbarg	2,700 roubles

=== Rzhyshchiv Hassidic Dynasty ===
The enviable economic situation may have encouraged tzaddikim from the Ostrog dynasty to take up residence in Rzhyschiv.

The first AdMo"R of Rzhyshchev (Urzhyshchev in the Hasidic tradition) was Rabbi Moshe Mendl of Urzhyshchev, the son of Rabbi Pinkhas of Ostrog. He was brought up in the house of ‘the Shpoler Zeyde’; in 1802, he took the place of the town's Hasidic leader and founded a dynasty that existed until the Holocaust.

Little is known about his son, Rabbi Yosef of Urzhyshchev, who inherited his father's place. Rabbi Yaakov Yosef's sons lived during the dynasty's heyday. The first, Rabbi Avraam Mendl of Urzhyshchev (? - 1910) was one of very few AdMo"Rim who openly supported the Zionist movement. His impassioned letter in support of the Hibat Zion movement was published in the Shivat Zion collection, and it is said that he sang Hatikva with tears in his eyes at the wedding of one of his grandsons. The second son, Rabbi Elyakim Gets of Urzhyshchev-Kozin (? - 1894), at first took his father's place but then ceded this to his brother and moved to Kozyn. He wrote ‘Imrey Emet’, published in Berdichev; its title's gematria is equal to the gematria of the author's and his father's names.

Rabbi Avraam Mendl of Urzhyshchev had three sons. Rabbi Isaya Mendl of Urzhyshchev became the Urzhyshchev AdMo"R after his father's death in 1910. He was an outstanding scientist, and was also renowned for his generosity. Rabbi Isaya was murdered during one of the pogroms in the spring of 1919. He was succeeded by Rabbi Avraam's second son, Rabbi Yaakov Yosef Mendl of Urzhyshchev, who was the Urzhyshchev AdMo"R beginning in 1919. Nothing is known about the third brother, Rabbi David, but his son, Rabbi Moshe Mendl of Urzhyshchev-Kyiv, was the Urzhyshchev AdMo"R in Kyiv. He was murdered during the Holocaust. The son of Rabbi Elyakim Gets of Urzhyshchev-Kozin, Rabbi Yaakov-Yosef of Kozin, took his father's place in Kozyn and later moved to Bohuslav. His fate under the Soviet government is not known.

In 1864, a conflict between the Hasidim of Rzhyshchev's AdMo"R and the followers of the other tzaddikim arose. The other tzaddikim had come to Rzhyshchev to collect donations: "it is clear that", David Asaf writes, "the invader was showered with stones and nearly killed." There were many other disagreements, and the Rzhyshchev tzaddik was even accused of counterfeiting.

== Notable people ==
- Lamed Shapiro, Jewish-Ukrainian-American Yiddish author
- Lina Kostenko, Ukrainian poet and writer

== International relations ==
Rzhyshchiv’s sister cities are:

- Kilgore, United States

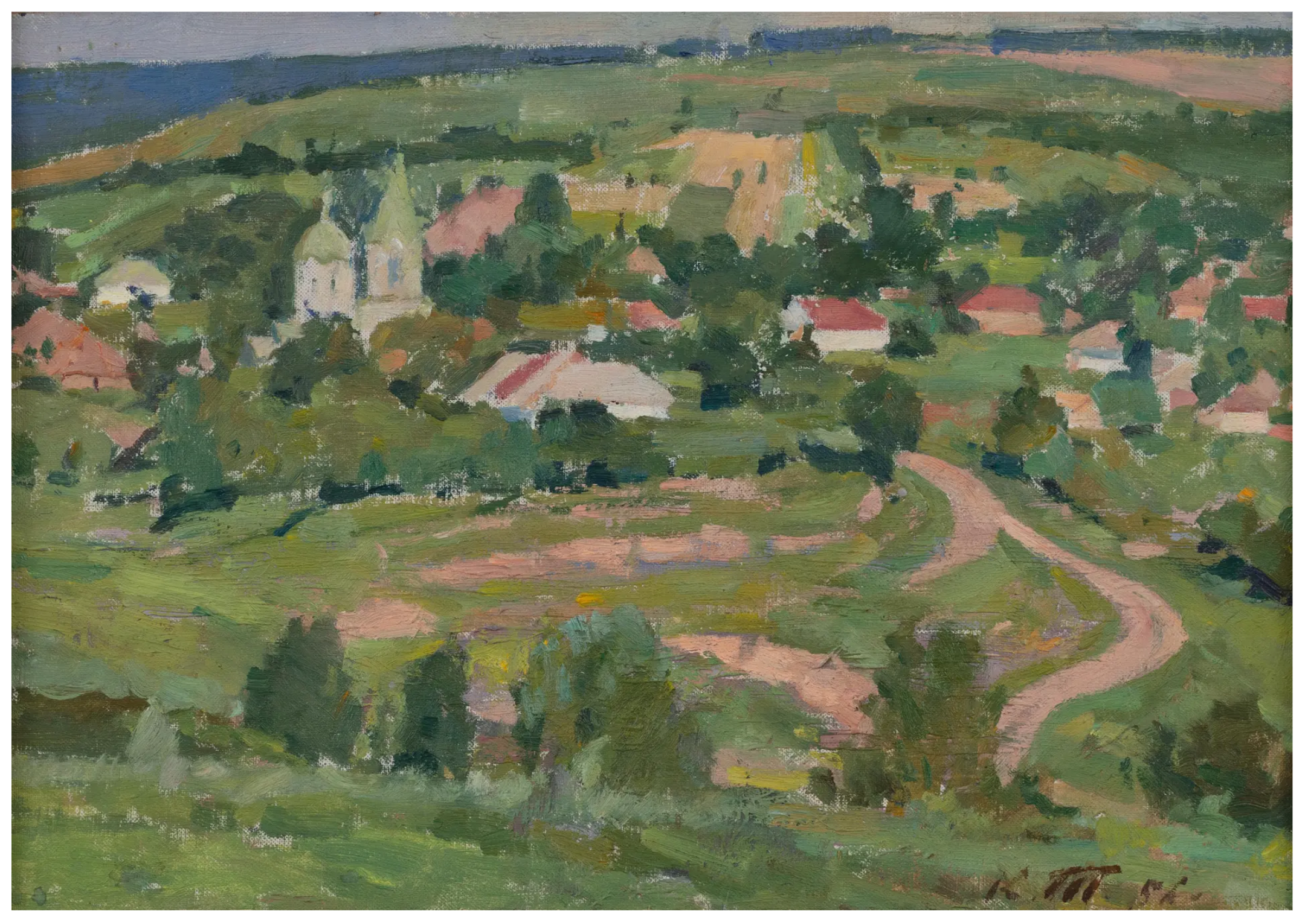
Karpo Trokhymenko. Sight on Rzhyshchiv (1956)

== Gallery ==
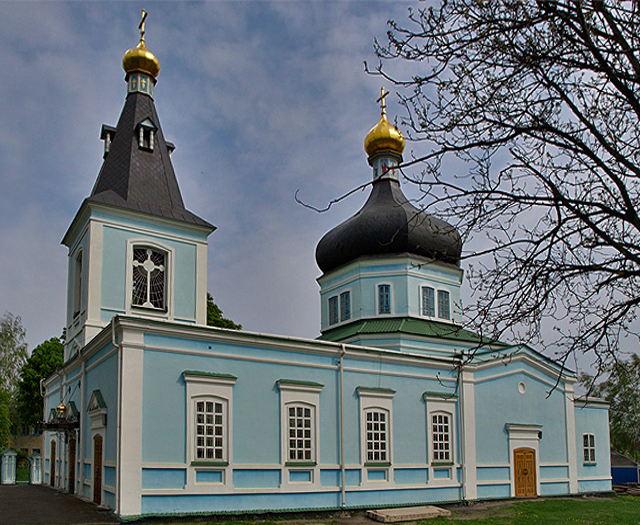
Trinity Church

Rzhyshchiv Humanities College

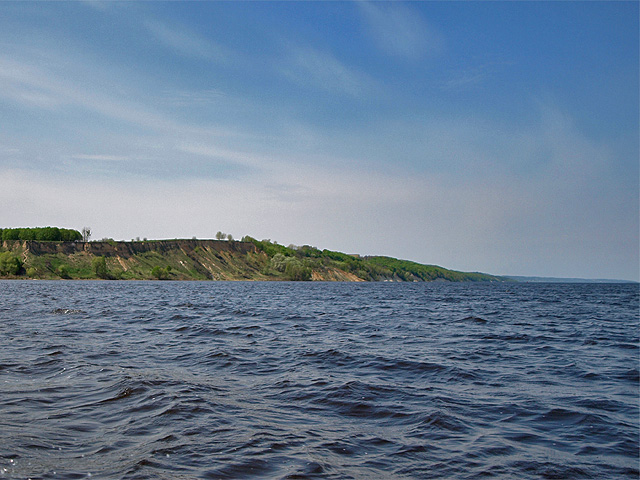
Dnieper River near Rzhyshchiv
