= Rzhyshchiv urban hromada =

Rzhyshchiv urban hromada Ржищівська міська громада
- Hromada
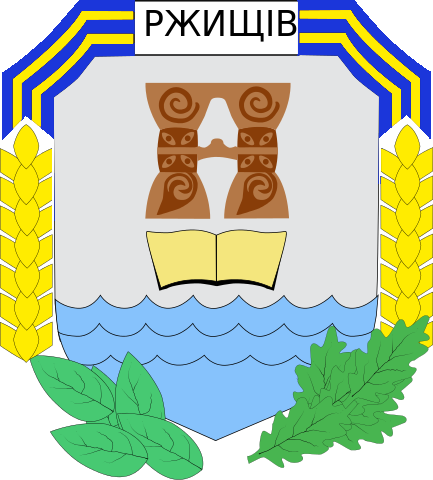
- Seal
- Interactive map of Rzhyshchiv urban hromada
- Country: Ukraine
- Oblast: Kyiv
- Raion: Obukhiv

Area
  - Total: 430.1 km^{2} (166.1 sq mi)

Population (2020)
  - Total: 14,288
  - Density: 33.22/km^{2} (86.04/sq mi)
- Settlements: 24
- Cities: 1
- Villages: 23
- Website: https://rzhyshivska-gromada.gov.ua/

Rzhyshchiv urban hromada (Ukrainian: Ржищівська міська громада) is a hromada (territorial community) in Ukraine, in Obukhiv Raion of Kyiv Oblast. The administrative center is the city of Rzhyshchiv.

The area of the hromada is 430.1 square kilometres (166.06 sq mi), and the population is 14,288 (2022 estimate)

It was formed on June 12, 2020, by merging the city of oblast significance of Rzhyshchiv and the rural municipalities of Balyko-Shchuchynka, Hrebeni, Hrushiv, Kuzmyntsi, Malyi Bukryn, Pivtsi, Pii, Staiky, Stritivka, Velyki Pritsky and Yablunivka. In July 2020, Rzhyshchiv hromada was included into a newly formed Obukhiv Raion.

== Settlements ==
The hromada consists of 1 city (Rzhyshchiv) and 23 villages:

- Balyko-Shchuchynka
- Vedmedivka
- Velykyi Bukryn
- Velyki Pritsky
- Vyselka
- Hrebeni
- Hrushiv
- Dibrivka
- Dudari
- Kuzmyntsi
- Lypovyi Rih
- Malyi Bukryn
- Onatsky
- Panikarcha
- Pivtsi
- Pii
- Romashky
- Staiky
- Stritivka
- Ulianyky
- Khodoriv
- Yushky
- Yablunivka

== See also ==
- List of hromadas of Ukraine
