= KDMC-FM =

KRCU radio station in Van Buren–Poplar Bluff, Missouri

- Van Buren, Missouri; United States
- Broadcast area: Poplar Bluff, Missouri; Doniphan, Missouri
- Frequency: 88.7 MHz
- Branding: KRCU

Programming
- Format: Public radio
- Affiliations: NPR

Ownership
- Owner: Southeast Missouri State University; (Board of Regents, Southeast Missouri State University)

History
- First air date: 2001
- Former call signs: KBIY (1998–2020)
- Former frequencies: 91.3 MHz (2001–2021)

Technical information
- Licensing authority: FCC
- Facility ID: 81163
- Class: C1
- ERP: 100,000 watts horizontal; 98,000 watts vertical
- HAAT: 150 meters (490 ft)
- Transmitter coordinates: 37°6′25″N 90°59′30″W

Links
- Public license information: Public file; LMS
- Webcast: Listen live
- Website: krcu.org

KDMC-FM (88.7 FM) is a radio station licensed to Van Buren, Missouri, United States. The station is currently owned by Southeast Missouri State University and simulcasts its KRCU public radio station based in Cape Girardeau.

== History ==
The Federal Communications Commission issued a construction permit for the station on May 29, 1998. The station was assigned the KBIY call sign on August 10, 1998, and received its license to cover on June 26, 2001. Under its original owner, the New Life Evangelistic Center, KBIY was part of the Here's Help Network of Christian radio programming.

New Life sold the station to Southeast Missouri State University for $45,000 in 2019; the station was to be used to bring NPR to the Poplar Bluff area, with the transmitter to be moved to Elsinore, Missouri. Under new call letters KDMC-FM—previously associated with the former student-run station at the Cape Girardeau campus—the station returned to the air on May 14, 2020.

On April 1, 2021, the FCC granted KDMC a frequency change from 91.3 FM to 88.7 FM and moved its transmitter to Ellsinore, Missouri.
