= KDM =

KDM or Kdm may refer to:

== Computing ==
- KDE Display Manager, a graphical login interface
- Knowledge Discovery Metamodel, a specification

== Military ==
- Kongelige Danske Marine (His/Her Danish Majesty's Ship), ship prefix of the Royal Danish Navy
- Martin KDM Plover, a missile

== Other uses ==
- cadmium soldering, for example 916 (22 carat) KDM Gold
- Kingdom Death: Monster, a cooperative board game
- KDM Shipping, a Cyprus-based holding company
- Social Democratic Harmony Party (Malay: Parti Kesejahteraan Demokratik Masyarakat), a Malaysian political party
- Dedi Mulyadi, an Indonesian politician
- Korean domestic market
