= KDC =

KDC may refer to:

- Kurt Donald Cobain (1967-1994), American songwriter
- Korean decimal classification, a system of library classification
- Key distribution center, part of a cryptosystem
- Kandi Airport, IATA code
- Karainagar Divisional Council, a Sri Lanka local authority
- Kordylewski Dust Clouds, sparse clouds of trapped interplanetary dust at the L_{4} and L_{5} Lagrangian points of the Earth–Moon system
