= KDM Shipping =

Holding Company

- Type: Private
- Industry: Sea – River Transport
- Founded: 2003
- Headquarters: Kyiv, Ukraine
- Key people: Kostiantyn Molodkovets (General Director)
- Products: Port services, passenger transportation, freight transportation, vessels production, holidays, business travel
- Website: kdmshipping.com

KDM Shipping is a holding company based from Cyprus.

The company consists of the KM Management (Cyprus), the Communal shipping company "Kiev" (based in Kyiv using the Dnieper River and the Black Sea), the "Capital Shipping Company", the Kyiv River Port, the Kherson Shipyard of Kuibyshev.
