= Rzhyshchiv River Port =

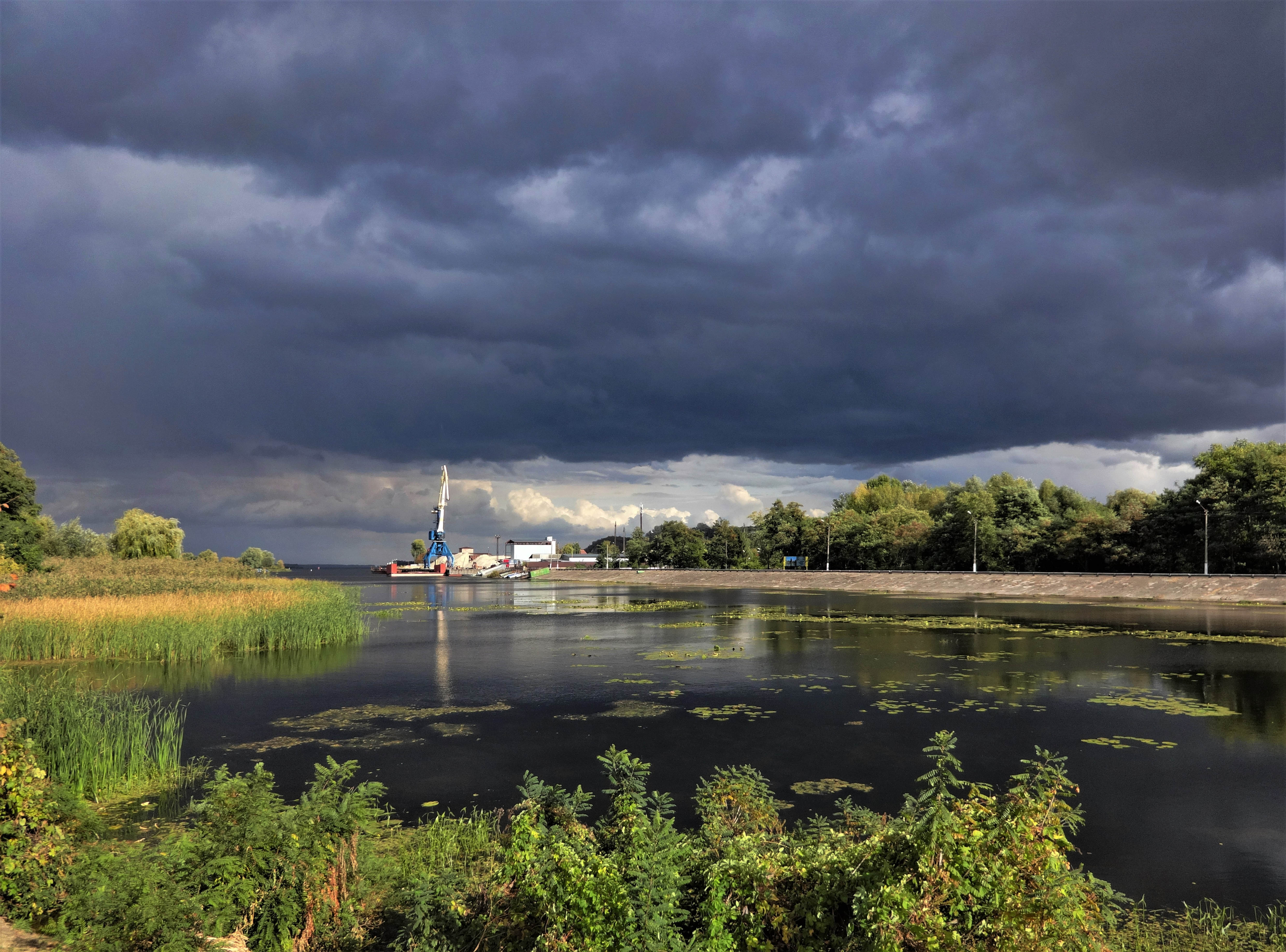
- Native name: Ржищівський річковий порт

Location
- Country: Ukraine
- Location: 09230, Kyiv Oblast, City of Rzhyshchiv, Admiral Petrenko Street, Building 43

Details
- Employees: 20

Rzhyshchiv River Port also called Rzhyshchivsky Port is a port enterprise on the Dnieper River, and is located in the city of regional importance Rzhyshchiv. There is a coffee shop that was formerly a station building. Rzhyshchiv has always been considered one of the most important Dnieper ports, and by the middle of the 19th century the cargo turnover here was higher than in the Kyiv River Port and was second only to Dnipropetrovsk River Port (formerly called Katerynoslav). The river station here is typical of the 70s, but rare for small towns. The cargo port has cranes, handles sand, building materials, and so on.

== See also ==
- List of ports in Ukraine
- Cargo turnover of Ukrainian ports
