= KDMC-LP =

Radio station at Southeast Missouri State University (2003–2015)

Cape Girardeau, Missouri; United States
- Frequency: 103.7 MHz

Programming
- Format: Defunct (formerly college radio; alternative)

Ownership
- Owner: Southeast Missouri State University; (Southeast Missouri State University Board of Regents)

Technical information
- Facility ID: 132020
- Class: L1
- ERP: 51 watts
- HAAT: 41.7 meters (137 ft)
- Transmitter coordinates: 37°18′42″N 89°31′52″W

KDMC-LP (103.7 FM; "Rage 103.7") was a radio station formerly licensed to Cape Girardeau, Missouri, United States. The station was owned by Southeast Missouri State University, with the license held by its Board of Regents. Rich Reagan, a student at Southeast, was the builder/first engineer of KDMC. The station used RCS Selector as playback automation services.

In April 2014, Southeast Missouri State University announced that it would close KDMC-LP, following changes to its mass media curriculum to eliminate radio courses and emphasize multimedia journalism. Some of the station's programming was to continue online, and KDMC's studios would be repurposed to provide student-produced news content for sister NPR station KRCU and the Arrow student newspaper. The school surrendered KDMC-LP's license to the Federal Communications Commission (FCC) on May 11, 2015; the FCC cancelled the license on May 19, 2015.
