= KRCU =

Public radio station at Southeast Missouri State University

- Cape Girardeau, Missouri; United States
- Broadcast area: Cape Girardeau, Park Hills, Poplar Bluff, Sikeston, and Southern Illinois
- Frequency: 90.9 MHz
- Branding: KRCU

Programming
- Format: Public Radio, talk, jazz and classical
- Affiliations: NPR; PRX; APM; Beethoven Network

Ownership
- Owner: Southeast Missouri State University; (Board of Regents, Southeast Missouri State University)
- Sister stations: KESF, KDMC-FM

History
- First air date: March 3, 1976
- Call sign meaning: River City University (Cape Girardeau is on the Mississippi River)

Technical information
- Licensing authority: FCC
- Facility ID: 61212
- Class: C2
- ERP: 6,500 watts
- HAAT: 212 meters (696 ft)
- Transmitter coordinates: 37°24′17.2″N 89°34′6.3″W

Links
- Public license information: Public file; LMS
- Webcast: Listen live
- Website: krcu.org

KRCU (90.9 MHz) is a non-commercial radio station licensed to Cape Girardeau, Missouri, United States, airing a public radio format of news, talk, jazz and classical music. Owned by Southeast Missouri State University in Cape Girardeau, programming is simulcast on two other Missouri stations, KESF on 88.9 MHz in Ste. Genevieve and KDMC-FM on 88.7 MHz in Van Buren. The stations serve 1.9 million people in Southeast Missouri, Southern Illinois and the Parkland.

KRCU's signal covers Cape Girardeau, Jackson, Sikeston, Marble Hill, Perryville and several communities in Southern Illinois.

== History ==
KRCU signed on the air on March 3, 1976. It was powered at only 10 watts and was a student-run college radio station. In 1981, it increased power to 100 watts, and in 1988 it began transitioning to a public radio format. In November 1990, KRCU became an National Public Radio member station. In 1992, KRCU increased power again, to 6,000 watts. It has since increased to 6,500 watts, allowing the signal to be heard within a 50–mile radius.

KSEF's signal covers Farmington, Park Hills, Ste. Genevieve, Fredericktown, Potosi, Festus, and reaches into the southern suburbs of St. Louis. It signed on the air in September 2006. Its previous city of license was Farmington until it changed to nearby Ste. Genevieve, in May 2010. KDMC-FM's signal covers Van Buren, Poplar Bluff, Piedmont, Eminence, and Doniphan. KDMC-FM joined the KRCU simulcast in May 2020 after the facility was acquired from the Here's Help Network.

== Programming ==
On weekdays, KRCU, KSEF and KDMC-FM air news and talk shows from NPR and other public networks much of the morning and afternoon. Programs include Morning Edition, All Things Considered, 1A and Fresh Air. Local updates are supplied by the KRCU newsroom. In middays and evenings, jazz and classical music are heard. Overnight, KRCU carries The Beethoven Network from WFMT Chicago.

On weekends, one-hour specialty programs are heard on a variety of subjects. They include The TED Radio Hour, Milk Street Radio, Planet Money, To the Best of Our Knowledge, Travel with Rick Steves, It's Been A Minute, Hidden Brain and Wait, Wait, Don't Tell Me. Weekend music programs include Mountain Stage and American Routes, along with shows on blues, folk music and bluegrass.

== Translators ==
Broadcast translators for KRCU
Call sign	Frequency	City of license	FID	ERP (W)	HAAT	Class	Transmitter coordinates	FCC info
KSEF	88.9 FM	Farmington, Missouri	90232	20,000	205 m (673 ft)	C2	37°47′58.1″N 90°33′44.4″W	LMS
KDMC-FM	88.7 FM	Van Buren, Missouri	81163	100,000	150 m (492 ft)	C1	36°55′50.2″N 90°45′0.4″W	LMS

Former logo
