= Mykolaiv =

City and administrative center of Mykolaiv Oblast, Ukraine

Mykolaiv Миколаїв
- City

Ukrainian transcription(s)
  - National, BGN/PCGN: Mykolaiv
  - ALA-LC: Mykolaïv
  - Scholarly: Mykolajiv
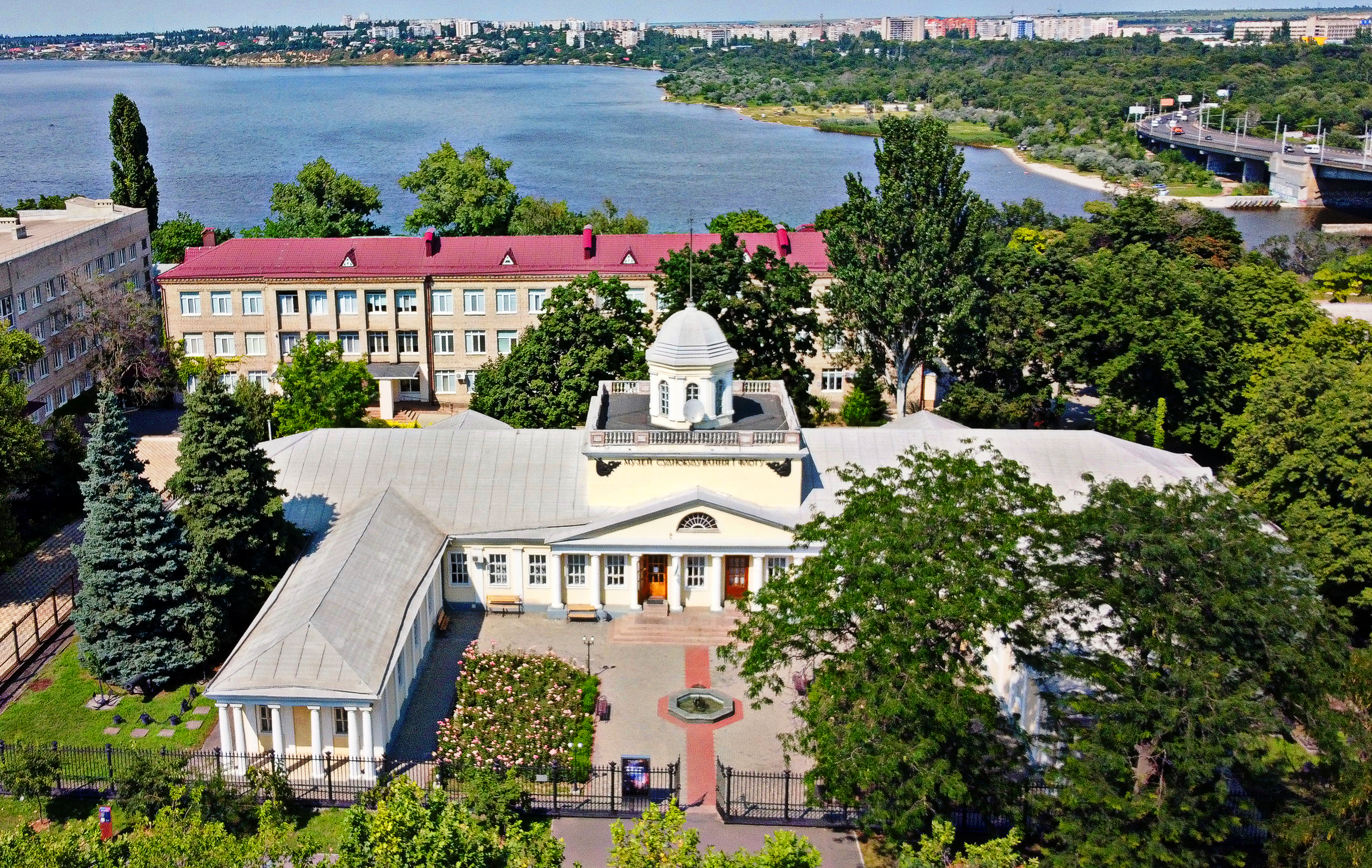
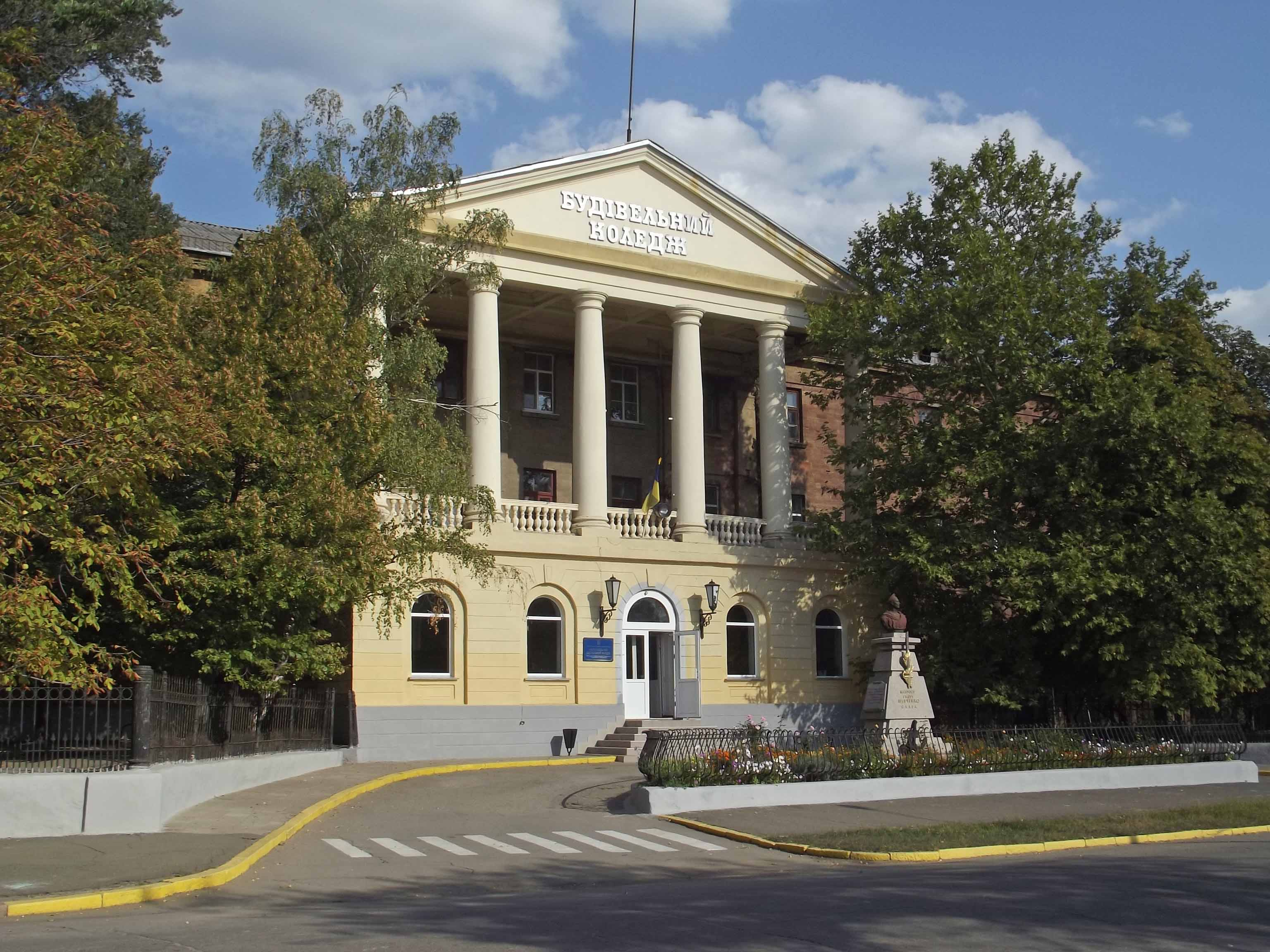
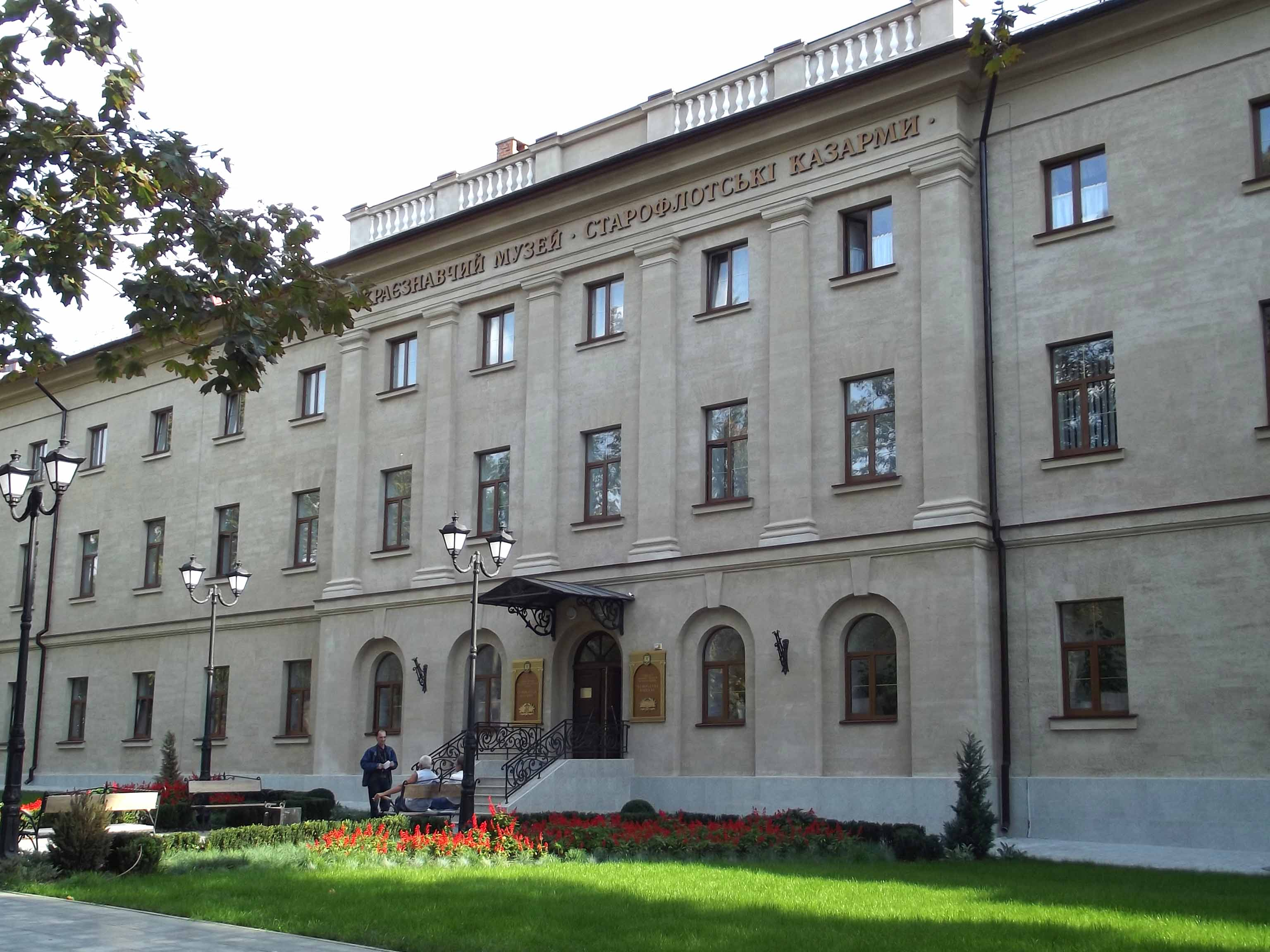
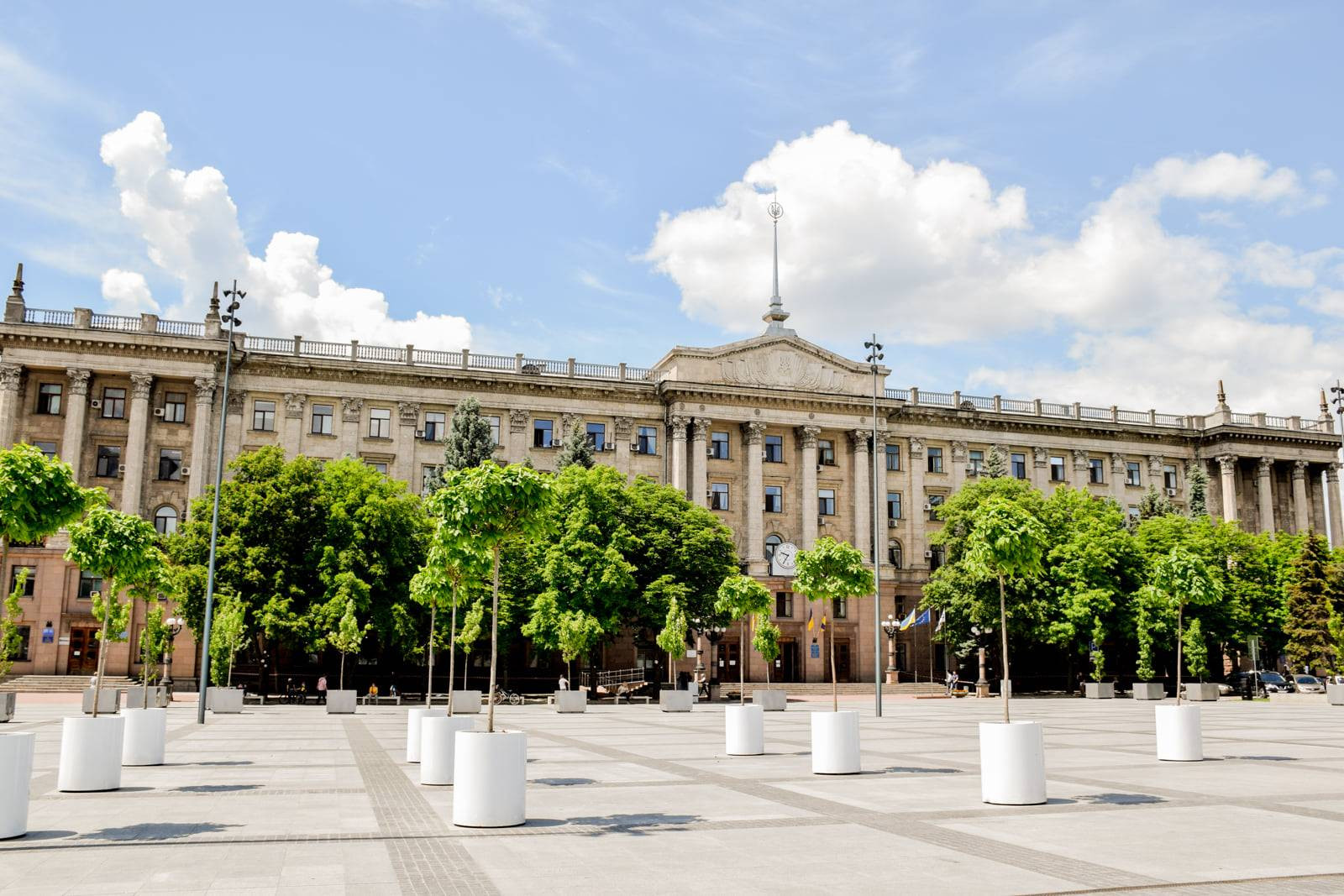
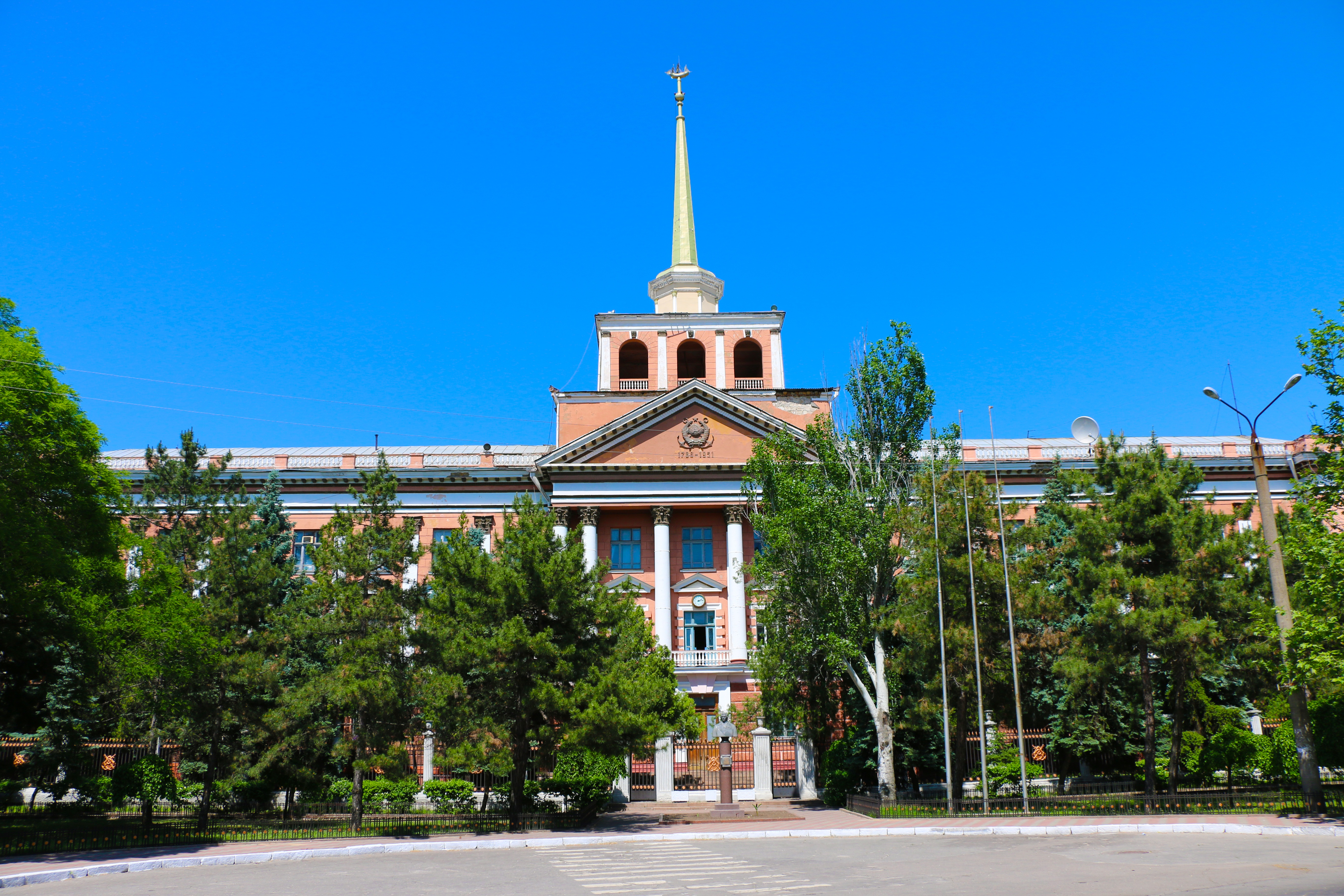
- Museum of Shipbuilding and the Fleet Construction College Historical museum City Hall Mykolayiv Shipyard headquarters

- Flag Coat of arms
- Nickname: "City of Shipbuilders"
- Interactive map of Mykolaiv
- Location of Mykolaiv in Mykolaiv Oblast Location of Mykolaiv in Ukraine
- Coordinates: 46°58′30″N 31°59′42″E
- Country: Ukraine
- Oblast: Mykolaiv Oblast
- Raion: Mykolaiv Raion
- Hromada: Mykolaiv urban hromada
- Founded: 1789
- City rights: 1789

Government
  - Mayor: Oleksandr Senkevych (Proposition)

Area
  - Total: 260 km^{2} (100 sq mi)

Population (2022)
  - Total: 470,011
  - Density: 1,800/km^{2} (4,700/sq mi)
- Time zone: UTC+2 (EET)
  - Summer (DST): UTC+3 (EEST)
- Postal code: 54000
- Area code: +380 512
- Vehicle registration: BE
- Website: mkrada.gov.ua/

Mykolaiv (Ukrainian: Миколаїв [mɪkoˈlɑjiu̯], Russian: Николаев, romanized: Nikolayev [nʲɪkɐˈla(j)ɪf]) is a port city and a hromada (municipality) in southern Ukraine. Mykolaiv is the administrative center of Mykolaiv Raion (district) and Mykolaiv Oblast (province).

Located at the confluence of the Inhul and Southern Bug rivers, the city serves as a transportation hub, containing a sea port, commercial port, and river port, as well as highway and railway junctions and an airport. Connected to the Black Sea, Mykolaiv is the location of an important bridge crossing. This city is one of the main shipbuilding centers in the region. Aside from three shipyards within the city, there are a number of research centers specializing in shipbuilding, such as the State Research and Design Shipbuilding Center, Zoria-Mashproekt and others. As of 2022, the city had a population of 470,011 (2022 estimate).

During the Russian invasion of Ukraine, large parts of Mykolaiv were destroyed by Russian attacks. Mykolaiv holds the honorary title "Hero City of Ukraine".

== Name ==
The city is known under two names, which differ in Ukrainian and Russian; there are several transliterations of each name. The Ukrainian name of the city is Миколаїв, transliterated as Mykolaiv. The Russian name, Никола́ев, transliterates as Nikolaev or Nikolayev.

The city was founded in the course of the Russian conquests during the Second Russo-Turkish War of 1787–1792. Founded by Prince Grigory Potemkin as Nikolaev, it was the last of the many cities he established. On 27 August 1789, Potemkin ordered its naming near the wharf at the mouth of the Ingul river, on a high, cool and breezy spot where the Ingul river meets the Southern Bug river. To build the city he brought in peasants, soldiers, and Turkish prisoners; 2,500 were working there during 1789. The shipyards were built first (1788).

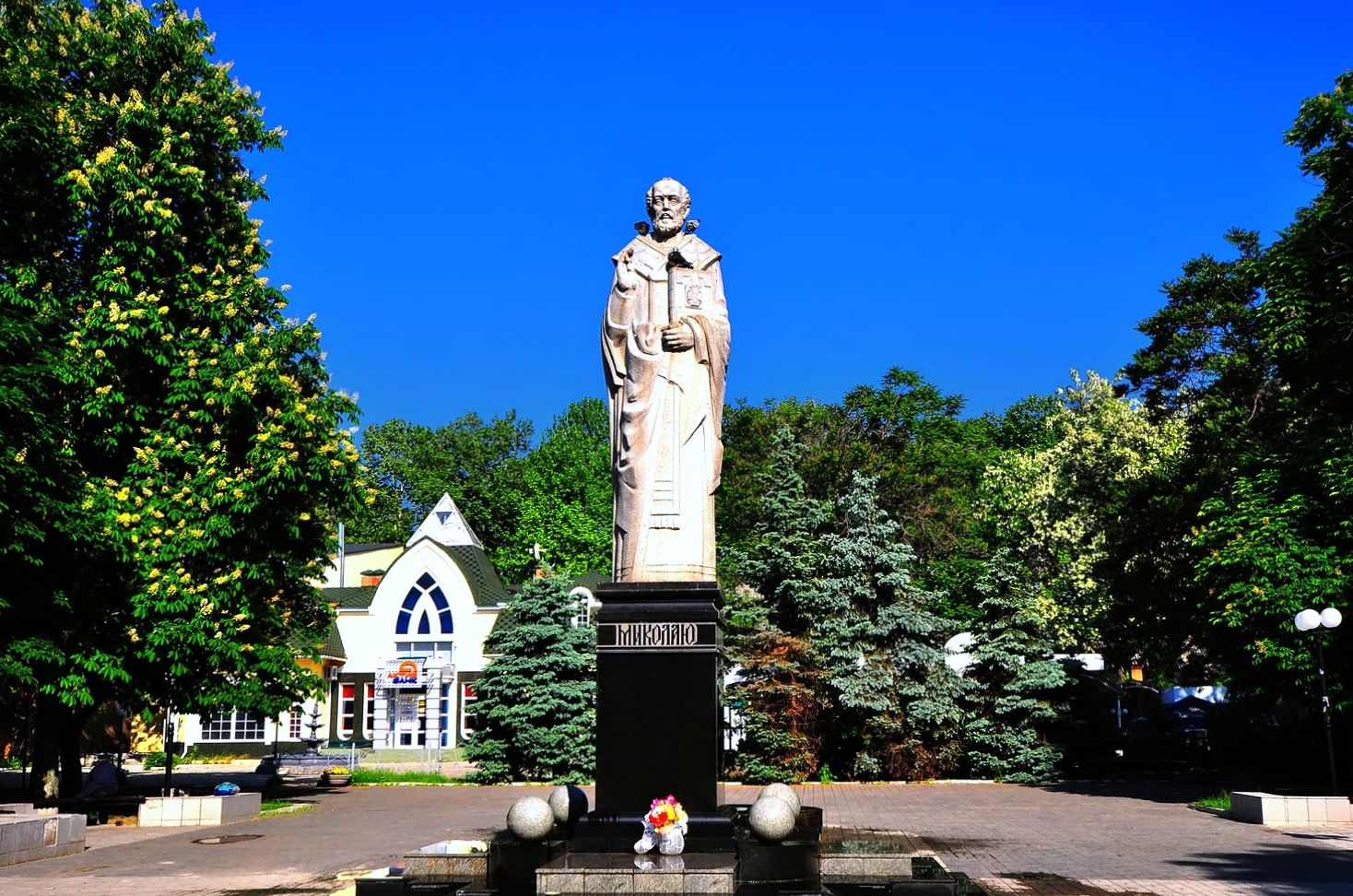
Statue in Mykolaiv of Saint Nicholas after whom the city is named.

Potemkin named the city after Saint Nicholas, the patron of seafarers, on whose day (6 December) he had obtained victory at the siege of Ochakov in 1788. The name Nikolaev is known from the legal order (writ) Number 1065 by Prince Potemkin to Mikhail Faleev dated 27 August 1789.

In 1920, after the establishment of Soviet power, the Odesa provincial council (of laborers and peasants' deputies) petitioned the Soviet Ukrainian government—the All-Ukrainian Central Executive Committee (VUTSIK)—to rename the city of Mykolaiv to Vernoleninsk ("Faithful to Lenin"). As the city of Mykolaiv was a district center of the Odesan province, presumably, the petition would have been initiated by the Odesa City Council, but documentary evidence of this so far has not been identified. On 15 April 1924 the Plenum of the Central Administrative-Territorial Commission of the VUTSIK considered and rejected the petition of the Odesan executive committee. Perhaps the members of the Soviet-Ukraine government thought that the name sounded too obsequious.

Information regarding the alleged renaming of Mykolaiv was disseminated by German maps of the 1920s and 1930s, as well as in German encyclopedic publications in 1927 and 1932, which show Vernoleninsk on the USSR part of the European maps. The city was designated as Mykolaiv in publications of the same map in other languages.

To distinguish Mykolaiv from the much smaller west Ukraine city of Mykolaiv in Lviv Oblast, the latter is sometimes called "Mykolaiv on the Dniester" after the major river that it is situated on, while the former is located on the Southern Bug, another major river, and may also be called "Mykolaiv on the Bug".

== History ==
=== Early history ===
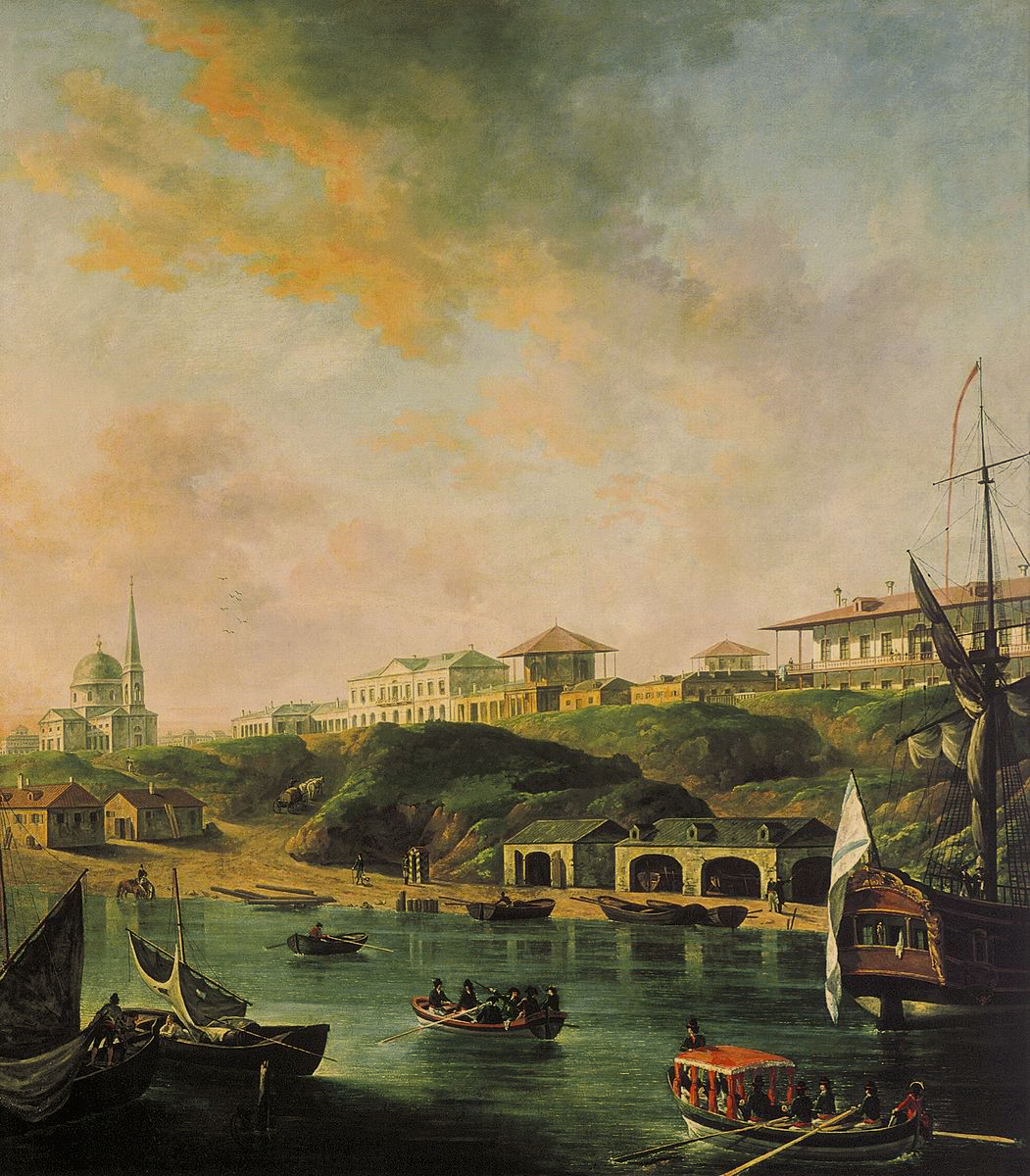
View of the City of Mykolaiv, painting by Fedor Alexeev, 1799

Archaeologists have found proof of ancient settlements on the territory of Mykolaiv. In 2018, archaeologists discovered a sunken Ancient Greek ship near the Mykolaiv region, dating from the fifth century BC, the period of Greek colonization of the Northern Black Sea. Researchers stated: "This Ancient Greek ship is one of the oldest known in the Northern Black Sea."

The city has long had close associations with shipbuilding.

The area was populated throughout time by Scythians, ancient Greeks, Slavic tribes, hordes of nomads and free Zaporozhian Cossacks.

The territory of the modern Mykolaiv Oblast encompassed the Buh-Hard Palanka with its center in Voznesensk, where, according to the 1756 Zaporozhian Host Register only 8,000 people resided; due to frequent Crimean Tatar raids, they lived predominantly on remote, fortified farmsteads for defensive reasons.

However, the intensive settlement of the Mykolaiv peninsula started in the last quarter of the 18th century already after the capture of the northern Black Sea coast region by Russia from the Ottoman Empire.

The Russian Empire's Black Sea Navy Headquarters was in Mykolaiv for more than 100 years until the Imperial Russian Navy moved it to Sevastopol, near the southern tip of the Crimean Peninsula. During the Crimean War (1853–1856), Mykolaiv became the main rear base to support Russia's efforts in the war. Most businesses that were created in the city belonged to the military-industrial complex, and, consequently, Mykolaiv was closed to foreigners for many decades. By the late 19th century, Mykolaiv's port ranked third in the Russian Empire (after Saint Petersburg and Odesa) in trade with foreign countries. Grain-export suppliers of the steppe region (of Ukraine and Southern Russia) were the greatest in the Russian Empire. Mykolaiv had become a great industrial center in the Southern Ukraine.

Stepan Makarov Monument

Jews started to settle in Mykolaiv in the late 18th century. By being in the area west of the Dnieper which was where Jews were legally allowed to reside (the Pale of Settlement), Mykolaiv became a major Jewish centre of the Russian Empire in the 19th century. During the course of the 19th century, the Czarist governments largely banned Jews from living east of the Dnieper River. In 1866 restrictions were lifted and the Jewish community of Mykolaiv developed rapidly but years later Jews suffered in the pogroms of May 1881 and April 1899.

=== 20th century ===
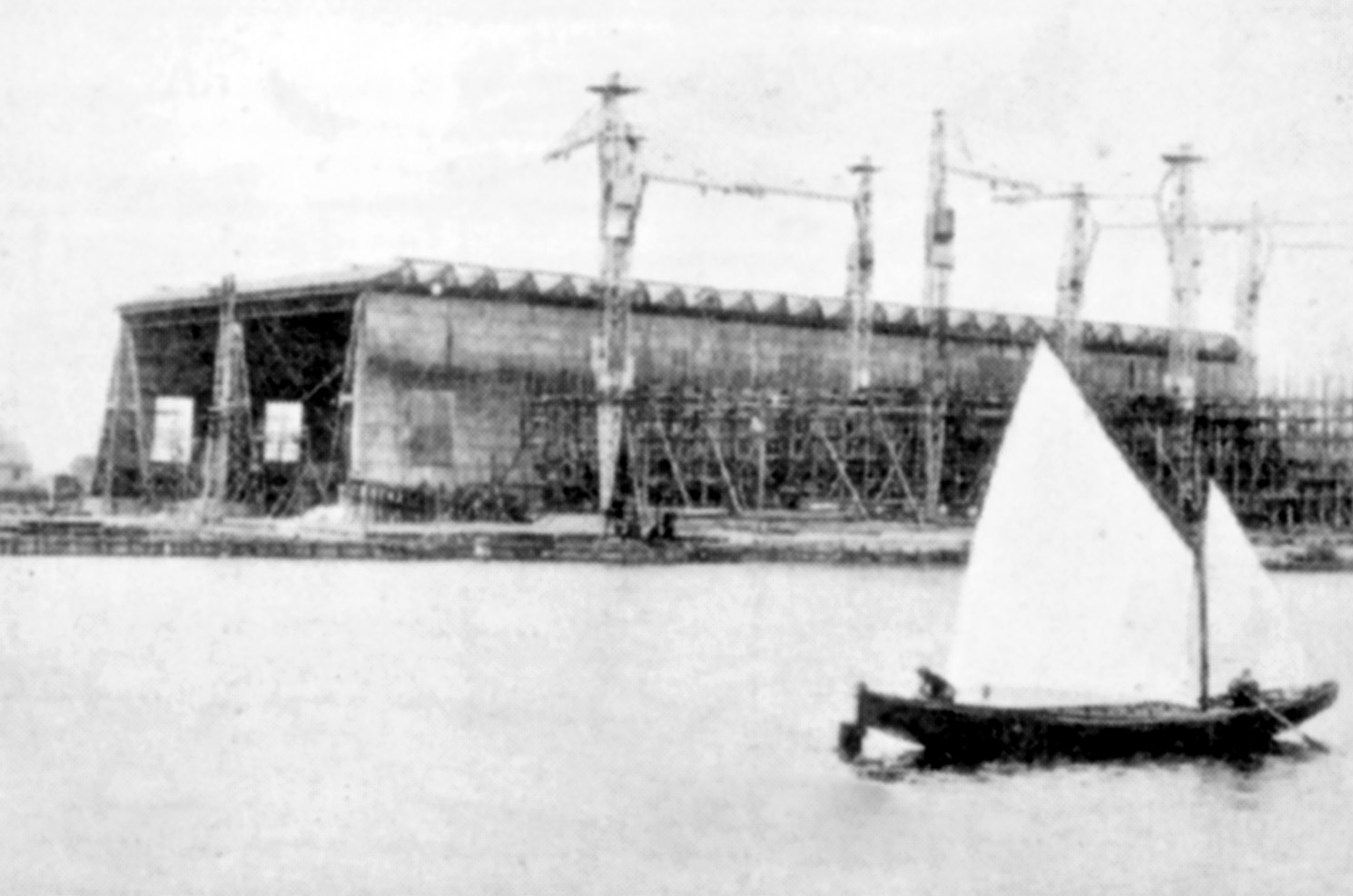
Shipyard in Mykolaiv circa 1900

During the Ukrainian War of Independence, the city was occupied in 1918 by German troops who were commanded by Field Marshal Hermann von Eichhorn, and passed to the Ukrainian State. It was subsequently occupied in 1919 by French and Greek troops who had been attached to the French-commanded Armée d'Orient (1915–1919) in the course of the Greek Ukrainian campaign - which formed part of the Southern Russia campaign of 1918–1919 by the Allies of World War I during the Allied intervention in the Russian Civil War. In 1920, Soviet power was established. Afterwards it was the seat of the Mykolaiv Governorate of Ukraine, until it was merged with the Odesa Governorate.

In 1926 there were 21,786 Jews (about 20.8% of the total population) in Mykolaiv.

In the course of Operation Barbarossa Mykolaiv was occupied on 16 August 1941 by German invaders. In September, German forces massacred over 35,000 non-combatants, most of them Jews, in the city and its region. In April 1942, the Stalag 364 prisoner-of-war camp was relocated from Rzeszów in German-occupied Poland to Mykolaiv. It was dissolved in December 1943. During the occupation, an underground partisan sabotage group, the Mykolaiv Center, conducted guerilla activities. On 28 March 1944 the city was liberated, in part because of Soviet Senior Lieutenant Konstantin F. Olshansky's marines and their daring raid during which the majority of his troops were killed.

In the post-war period Mykolaiv became one of the shipbuilding centers of the USSR, with three shipyards: Black Sea, 61 Kommunara, and Okean.

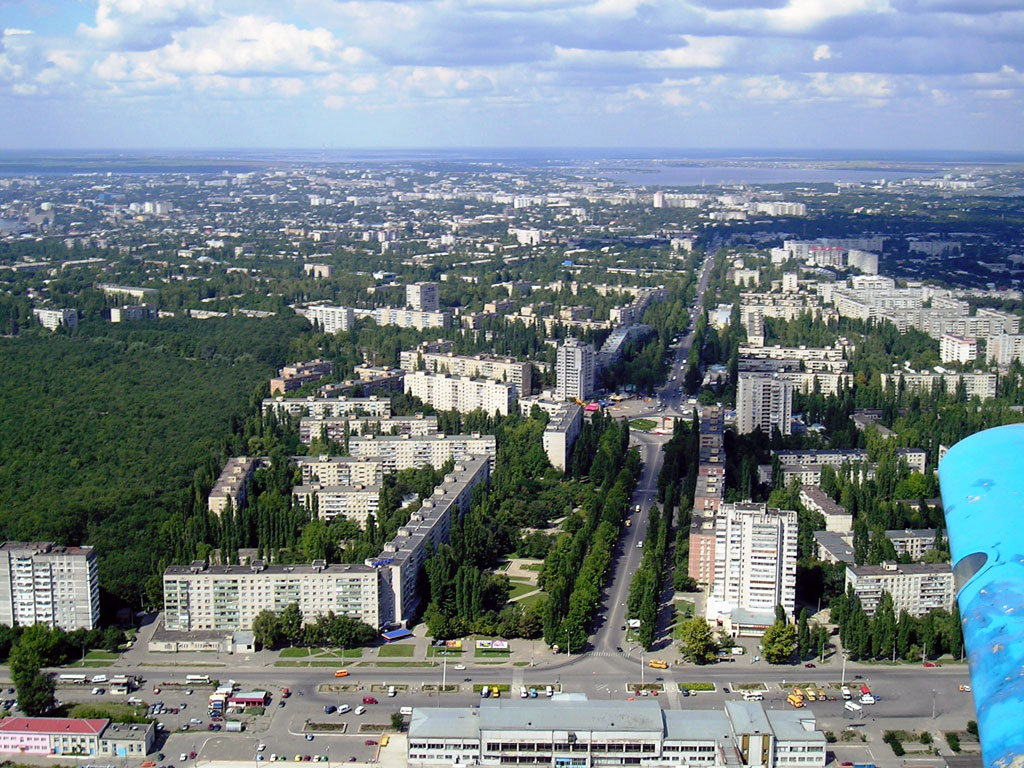
Soviet-era apartment blocks in Mykolaiv

The asteroid 8141 Nikolaev (1982 SO4) was discovered in 1982 by Nikolai Chernykh at the Crimean Astrophysical Observatory and was named in honor of the city.

=== 21st century ===
In March 2012, Mykolaiv gained international notoriety for lawlessness and police corruption following the rape and murder of Oksana Makar. Her three attackers were apprehended, but two were released because of family connections to local government officials. After a media outcry and public protests, all three attackers were charged with her murder.

During the Euromaidan protests of 2013–2014, Mykolayiv was the scene of anti-Yanukovich protests. After the victory of Euromaidan, the situation calmed down somewhat until 7 April 2014, when some pro-Russians tried to take over the local administration building. Pro-Ukrainians stopped them from taking over the administration building and destroyed the pro-Russian camp not far from it, after which the situation in the city became calm.

Until 2016, the main street of Mykolaiv was called Sovetskaya ("Soviet Street"). In 2016, it was renamed Soborna Street.

Until 18 July 2020, Mykolaiv was incorporated as a city of oblast significance. It also served as the administrative center of Mykolaiv and Vitovka Raions even though it did not belong to any of these raions. In July 2020, as part of the administrative reform of Ukraine, which reduced the number of raions of Mykolaiv Oblast to four, the city of Mykolaiv was merged into Mykolaiv Raion.

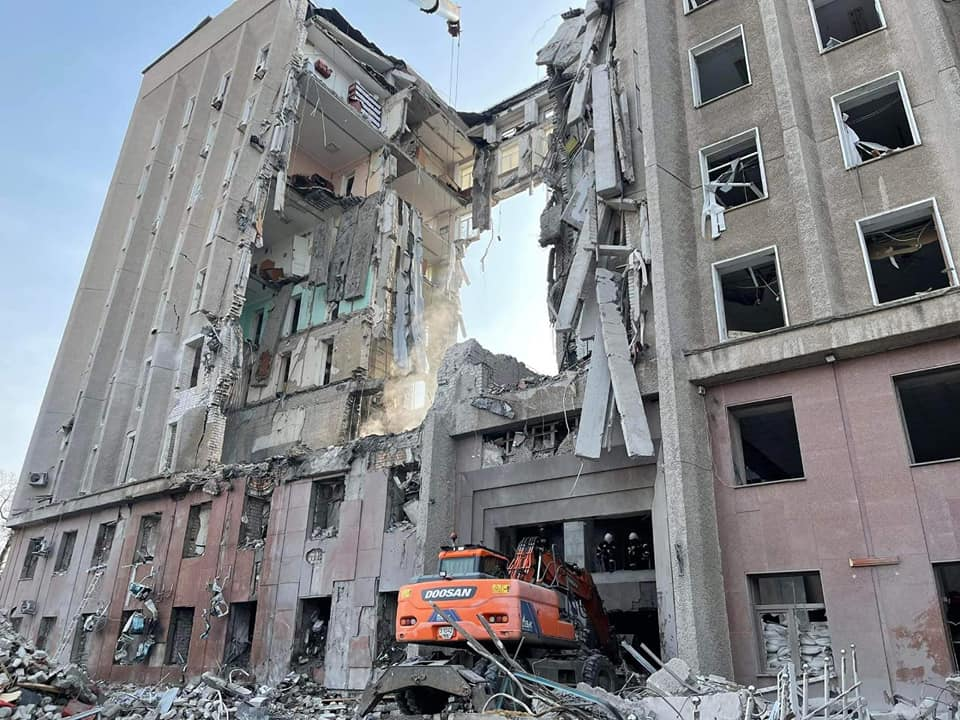
Mykolaiv Regional State Administration after the Russian rocket strike on 29 March 2022

In February and March 2022, during the Russian invasion of Ukraine, Russian military forces attacked Mykolaiv and took the city into a semi-encirclement. Ukrainian forces barred Russian forces from the city, though Russian artillery continued to shell it. By July, half of the pre-war population had left the city. The Danish government has invested nearly $250 million to help the city with multiple issues such as construction, education, green energy and vocational training.

Following a Russian strike against the main waterline connecting Mykolaiv with Dnipro river on 12 April 2022, local inhabitants were left without access to centralized water supply for almost a month. Later, water for the needs of the city's population was being procured from local rivers. On 7 October 2025 Oleksiy Kuleba, Minister of Communities and Territorial Development of Ukraine, officially reported, that centralized supply of freshwater to the city has been resumed after the completion of a new water pipeline.

== Administrative status ==
Mykolaiv is the administrative center of Mykolaiv Oblast (region), as well as that of Mykolaiv Raion. It hosts the administration of Mykolaiv urban hromada, one of the hromadas of Ukraine.

== Geography ==
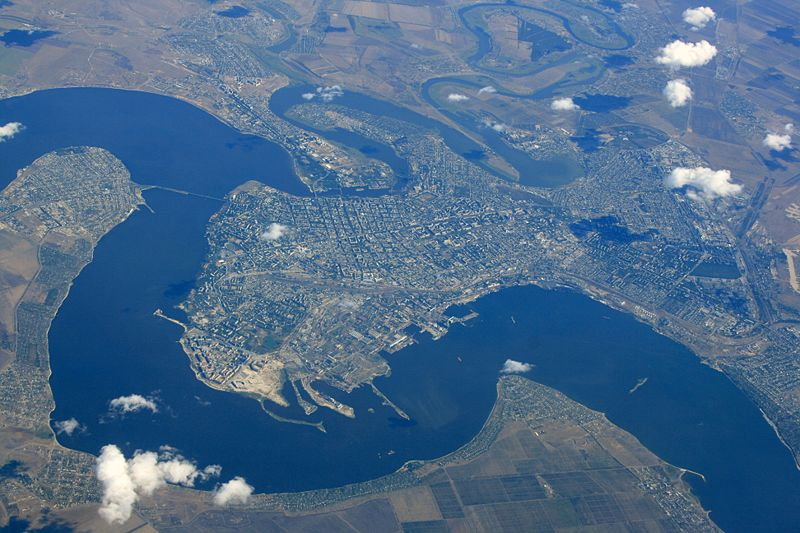
Bird's-eye view of the city center at the river knee of Southern Bug (Boh)

Mykolaiv is located in a primarily flat terrain area, the fertile, grain-producing steppe region of southern Ukraine. The nearest mountains to Mykolaiv are 300 km (186 mi) south, at the southern end of the Crimean Peninsula. The lack of any mountain barriers north of Mykolaiv means that cold Arctic winds can blow south, unimpeded by any terrain elevation, to Mykolaiv in winter.

Mykolaiv is on a peninsula along the estuary of the Southern Bug river where it meets the Inhul River, 65 km (40 mi) from the Black Sea. Both the Inhul River and the Southern Bug River follow very winding courses just before they join at the northeast corner of Mykolaiv. This has created several long and narrow peninsulas just north of Mykolaiv, and the main part of Mykolaiv is itself on a peninsula at a 180-degree bend in the Southern Bug River.

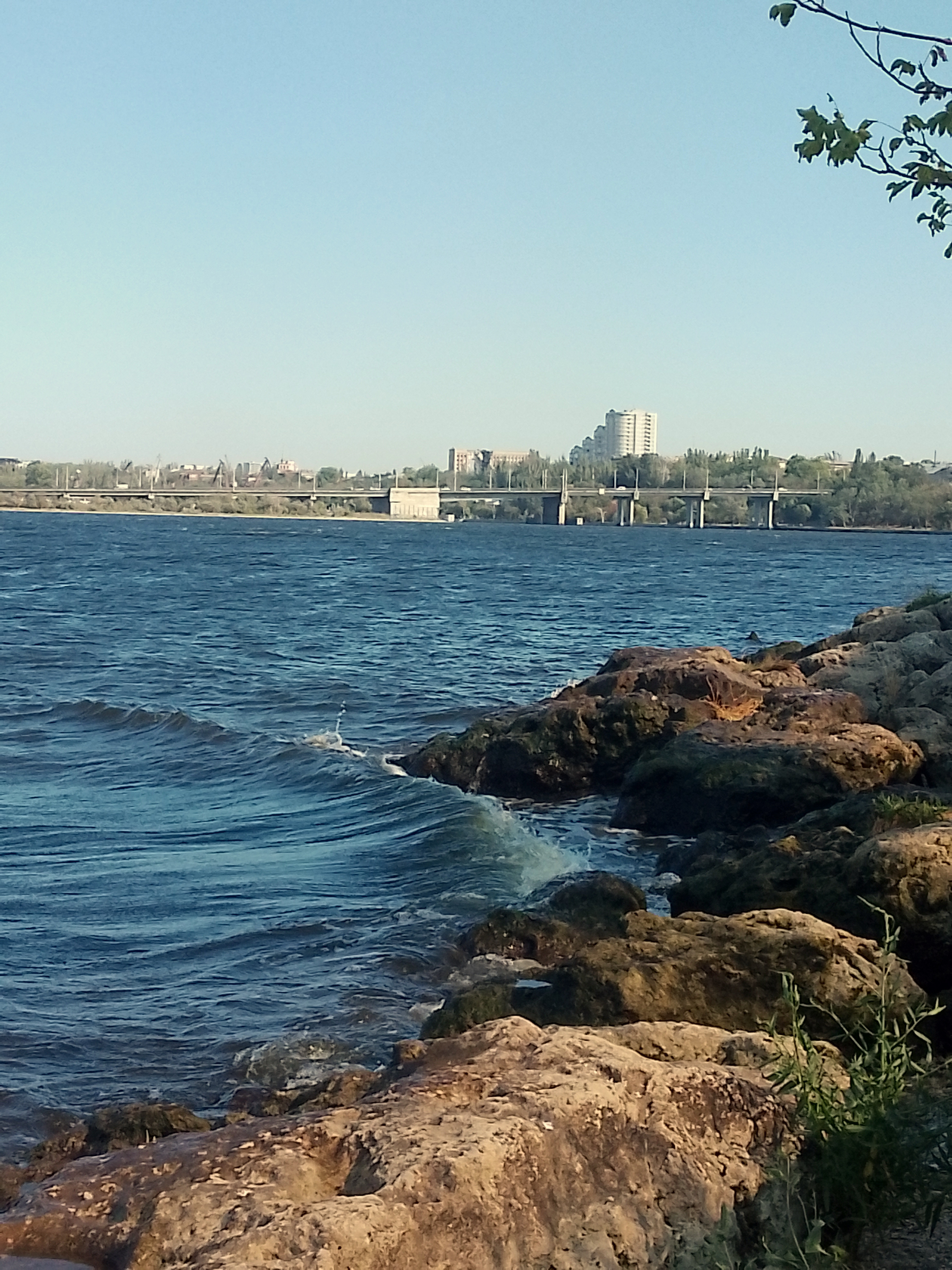
View on the city and Ingulskiy bridge from the Camp field

The area of the city is 260 km^{2} (100 sq mi).

Mykolaiv is in the second time zone (Eastern European Time).

=== Ecology ===
Mykolaiv has environmental issues, which is common in many cities in Ukraine, such as pollution of water, the air, and groundwater; drinking water quality, noise, waste management, and conservation of biological diversity in the city. One of Mykolaiv's most urgent problems is the disposal of solid household waste.

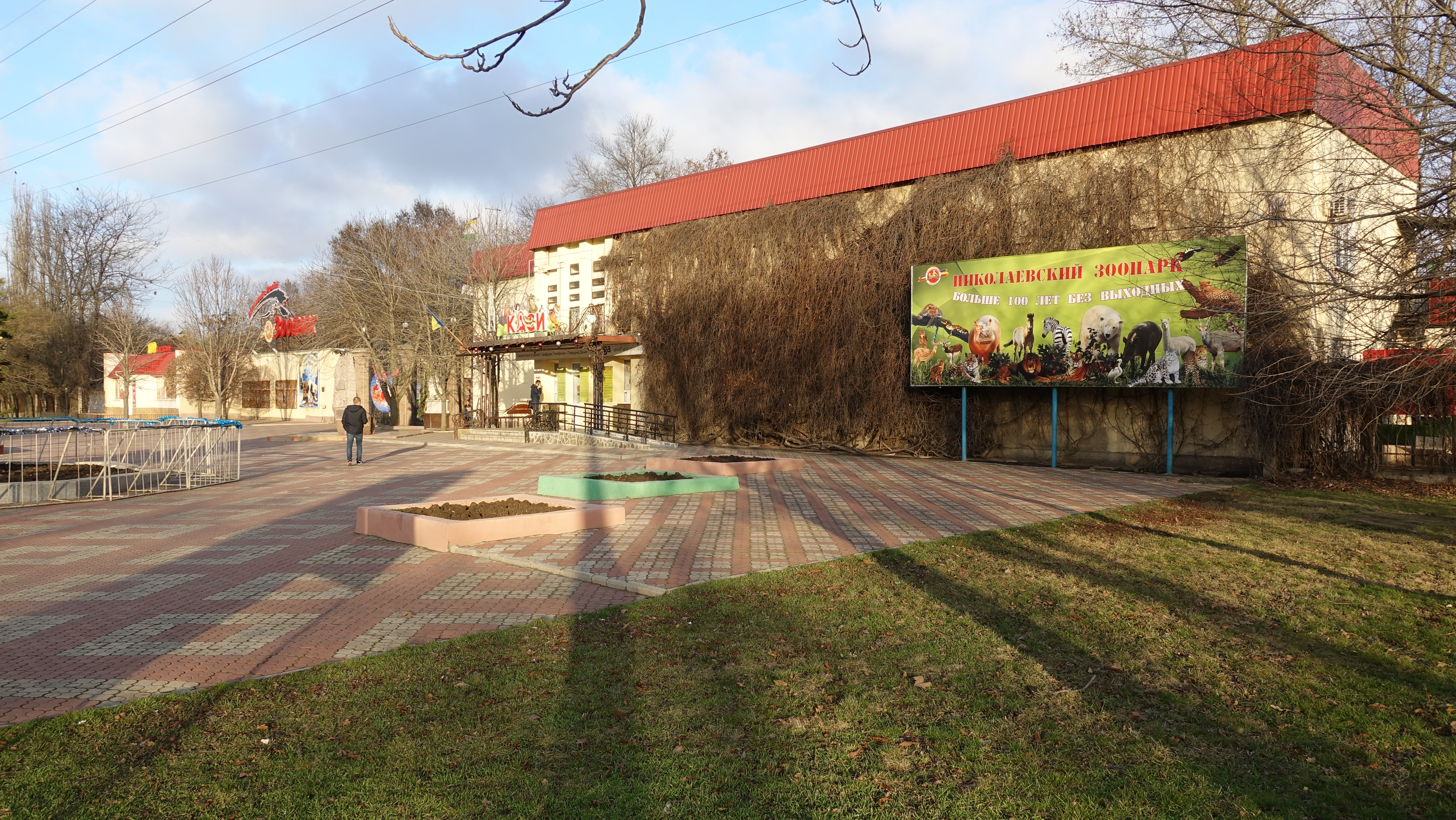
Mykolaiv Zoo

The city has 18 preserved sites, totaling about 12 km^{2} (5 sq mi):

- The Mykolaiv Zoo
- The monuments of landscape art: Park Peremohy, Park People's Garden, 68 Paratroopers Park, Square, The Sivašskij, The Boulevard Bunker, Linea (Line) Park, Young Heroes Park; Youth Park in the Inhulskyi District
- The Botanical Natural Monument Memory Square
- The Dubki Reserved Nature boundary
- The Balabanovka Forest Reserve
- The Reservoir Hydrological Reserve
- The Turkish Fountain Hydrological Natural Monument
- The Dubka (oak) 4 Botanical Nature Monument

=== Climate ===
The city's climate is moderately continental- cold semi arid steppe climate with cold winters and warm to hot summers. Mykolaiv's average temperature is 10 °C (50 °F). The lowest average temperature is in January −1.9 °C (29 °F), the highest in July 23.1 °C (74 °F).

Mykolaiv has an average of 472 mm (19 in) of precipitation per year, with the lowest precipitation in October, and the most in July. Mykolaiv has mild snow cover every year.

Average relative humidity is 73% for the year; the lowest humidity is in August (60%); the highest in December (86%). The lowest cloud are seen in August; the highest are in December.

The prevailing winds come from the North; the least frequent source of wind is the Southeast. The maximum wind speed is in February, the lowest is from July through September. In January, the average wind speed is 4.1 m/s (meters per second); in July, the average is 3.1 m/s.

Climate data for Mykolaiv (1981–2010, extremes 1900–2015)
Month	Jan	Feb	Mar	Apr	May	Jun	Jul	Aug	Sep	Oct	Nov	Dec	Year
Record high °C (°F)	14.0 (57.2)	18.1 (64.6)	24.1 (75.4)	32.3 (90.1)	37.4 (99.3)	37.8 (100.0)	40.0 (104.0)	40.1 (104.2)	36.5 (97.7)	32.9 (91.2)	23.4 (74.1)	15.6 (60.1)	40.1 (104.2)
Mean daily maximum °C (°F)	0.9 (33.6)	2.0 (35.6)	7.7 (45.9)	15.8 (60.4)	22.6 (72.7)	26.5 (79.7)	29.3 (84.7)	29.0 (84.2)	22.7 (72.9)	15.6 (60.1)	7.5 (45.5)	2.5 (36.5)	15.2 (59.4)
Daily mean °C (°F)	−1.9 (28.6)	−1.5 (29.3)	3.1 (37.6)	10.2 (50.4)	16.4 (61.5)	20.5 (68.9)	23.1 (73.6)	22.6 (72.7)	16.9 (62.4)	10.6 (51.1)	4.0 (39.2)	−0.4 (31.3)	10.3 (50.5)
Mean daily minimum °C (°F)	−4.5 (23.9)	−4.5 (23.9)	−0.5 (31.1)	5.4 (41.7)	11.0 (51.8)	15.2 (59.4)	17.5 (63.5)	16.8 (62.2)	11.9 (53.4)	6.4 (43.5)	1.1 (34.0)	−3.0 (26.6)	6.1 (43.0)
Record low °C (°F)	−29.7 (−21.5)	−28.8 (−19.8)	−20.8 (−5.4)	−7.9 (17.8)	−1.2 (29.8)	4.2 (39.6)	9.4 (48.9)	4.6 (40.3)	−1.4 (29.5)	−13.4 (7.9)	−18.2 (−0.8)	−24.6 (−12.3)	−29.7 (−21.5)
Average precipitation mm (inches)	27.6 (1.09)	29.6 (1.17)	26.0 (1.02)	28.5 (1.12)	44.3 (1.74)	49.9 (1.96)	48.3 (1.90)	34.2 (1.35)	41.6 (1.64)	32.4 (1.28)	34.1 (1.34)	31.9 (1.26)	428.4 (16.87)
Average precipitation days (≥ 1.0 mm)	5.7	5.5	5.5	5.4	6.0	6.6	5.5	3.8	4.8	4.6	5.0	6.1	64.5
Average relative humidity (%)	84.2	82.2	76.6	67.9	64.1	64.8	60.8	59.2	67.4	75.1	84.0	86.1	72.7
Mean monthly sunshine hours	69	74	122	181	263	289	308	295	232	168	69	52	2,122
Source 1: NOAA
Source 2: European Climate Assessment & Dataset (extremes 1900–2015), (Note: Station ID for the Mykolaiv is 254.) Source 3: NOAA (sun, 1961–1990)

== Population ==
Historical population
Year	Pop.	±%
1897	92,012	—
1926	101,182	+10.0%
1939	166,688	+64.7%
1959	226,207	+35.7%
1970	331,037	+46.3%
1979	439,915	+32.9%
1989	502,776	+14.3%
2001	514,136	+2.3%
2011	498,748	−3.0%
2022	470,011	−5.8%

Ethnicity	1897	1926	1939	1959	1989	2001	2017
Ukrainians	8.5%	29.9%	49.7%	59.7%	63.2%	72.6%	84%
Russians	66.3%	44.6%	31.0%	30.3%	31.2%	22.6%	12%
Jews	19.5%	20.8%	15.2%	6.8%	2.1%	0.5%	
Belarusians	0.2%	0.3%	0.7%	1.0%	1.1%	0.8%	
Bulgarians	0.1%	0.2%	0.6%	0.6%			
Poles	2.8%	1.7%					
Germans	0.9%	1.1%	0.9%	0.1%			

=== Language ===
Distribution of the population by native language according to the 2001 census:

Language	Number	Percentage
Ukrainian	214 710	42.17%
Russian	289 224	56.81%
Other or undecided	5 168	1.02%
Total	509 102	100.00%

As of 2017, 63% of the population spoke Russian at home, 7% Ukrainian, and 28% spoke both Ukrainian and Russian equally.

According to a survey conducted by the International Republican Institute in April–May 2023, 30% of the city's population spoke Ukrainian at home, and 61% spoke Russian.

== Awards ==
The Soviet Government awarded Mykolaiv the Order of the Red Banner of Labour on 31 December 1970, for successfully fulfilling its assignments for the development of industrial production, in the USSR's five-year economic plan.

On 25 March 2022 Ukrainian President Volodymyr Zelenskyy awarded Mykolaiv the title of Hero City of Ukraine due to the Battle of Mykolaiv.

== Administrative districts ==
Mykolaiv is divided into four urban districts:

- Tsentralnyi District is located in the northwest of the city. It includes the historic center of Mykolaiv, Raketne Urochyshche, Temvod, Soliani, Pivnichnyi, Ternivka (with a separate village council), Matviivka, Varvarivka.
- Zavodskyi District is located in the west of the city. In this area, many industrial enterprises are concentrated. It also includes neighborhoods Lisky and Namyv, as well as towns of Velyka Korenykha and Mala Korenykha.
- Inhulskyi District (former Leninskyi District) is located in the east of Mykolaiv. Among other neighborhoods, it includes the PTZ, Novyi Vodopii, Staryi Vodopii. The district has a zoo, bus and railway stations.
- Korabelnyi District is located in the south of the city. It includes a broad beam, Bohoiavlenskyi, Balabanivka, Kulbakyne.

== Official symbols ==
Mykolaiv adopted its current coat of arms on 26 September 1997. Its design came from the one adopted in 1883, by removing the symbol of Kherson province to which Mykolaiv didn't belong anymore. Mykolaiv adopted its current flag on 2 July 1999 and its anthem on 11 September 2004.

== Economy ==
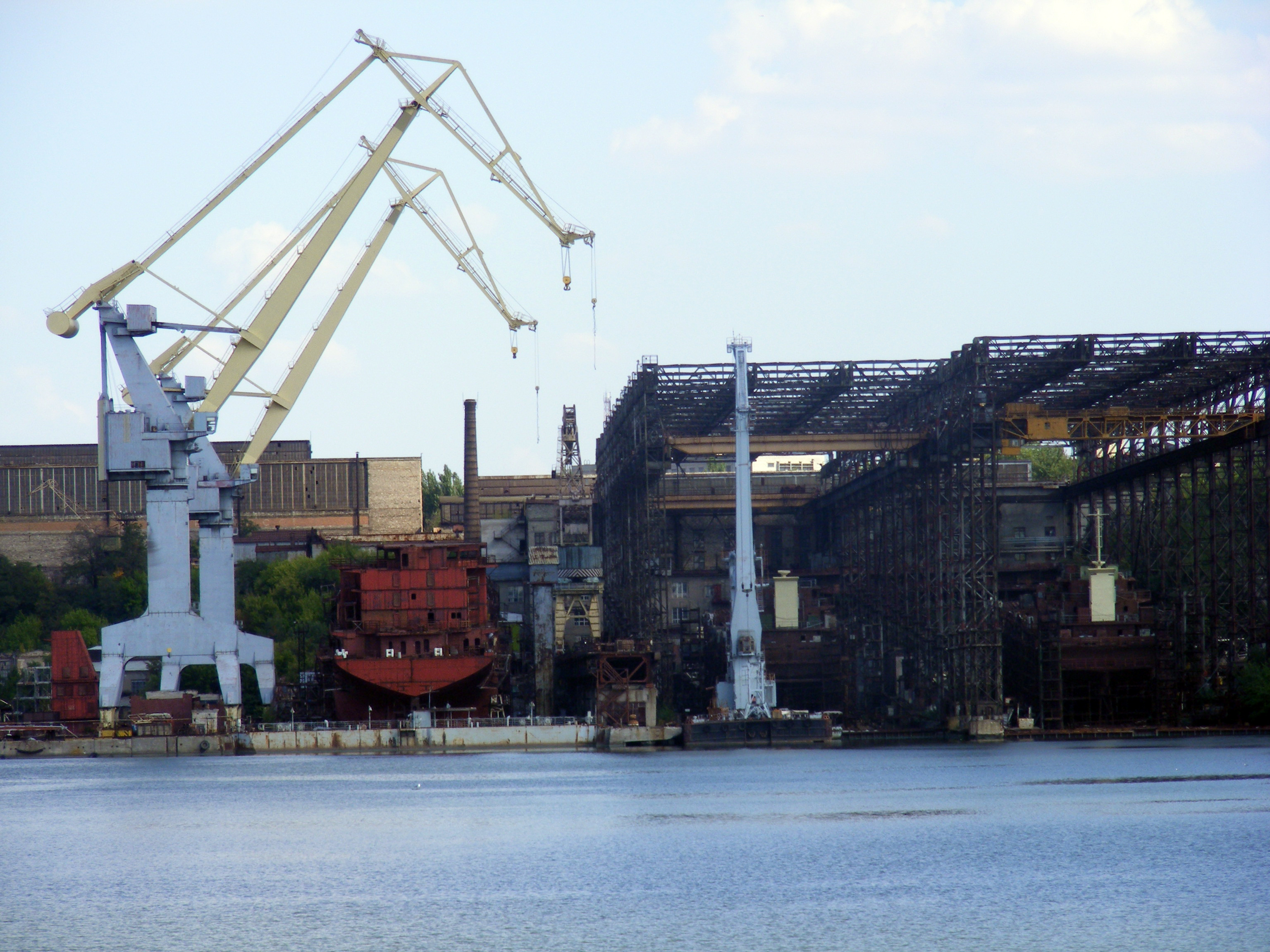
Mykolayiv Shipyard

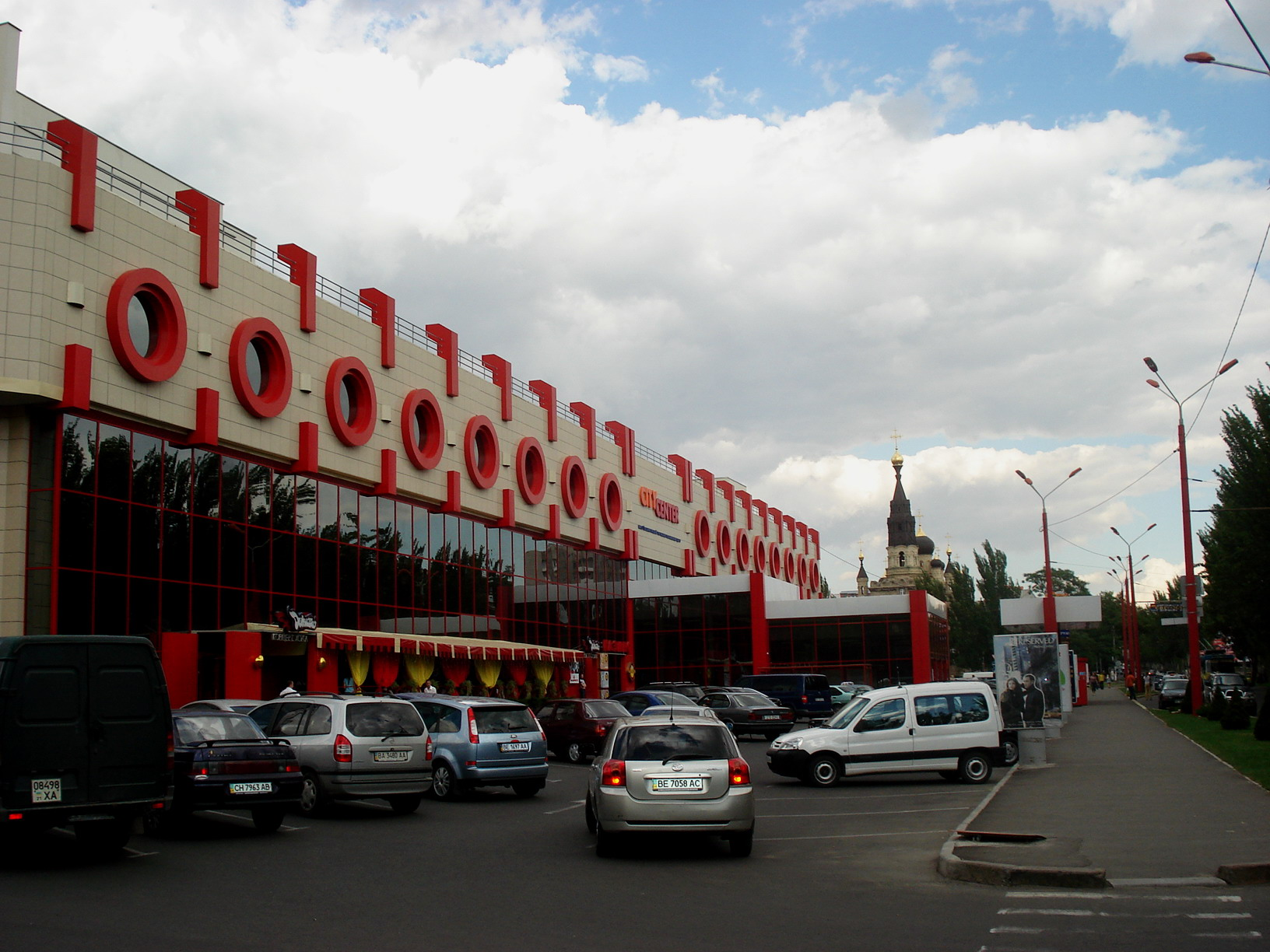
Modern shopping mall in the Mykolaiv city center

Mykolaiv is a major shipbuilding center of Ukraine since the time of both the Russian Empire (1721–1917) and the now defunct Soviet Union (1922–1991) and an important river port. The city has three major shipyards one of which is capable of building large navy ships. Other important industries are mechanical engineering, power engineering, metallurgy and food industry.

Mykolaiv was closed to foreign visitors until the late 1980s due to the large number of secret Soviet Navy projects that took place in the city (as well as due to its military air base, turbine factory and military port). The majority of the Soviet Navy's surface ships, including its only aircraft carrier, the aircraft carrier Kuznetsov, were built in Mykolaiv.

In May 2011, Ukrainian President Viktor Yanukovych visited Mykolaiv and said that Ukraine was serious about reviving and further developing its shipbuilding industry in the Mykolaiv region.

One of the largest industrial businesses in the city is the Mykolaiv Aluminia Factory (formerly part of Rusal and currently owned by Glencore), which produces aluminium oxide (alumina), raw material for the production of aluminum.

In addition to heavy industry, the city has a developed food processing industry, including a juice maker, Sandora (part of PepsiCo), a dairy products maker, Laktalis-Mykolaiv, and a brewery, Yantar. Nibulon (Ukrainian: Нібулон), one of Ukraine's biggest agriculture companies specialized in the production and exportation of grain such as wheat, barley and corn is headquartered in Mykolaiv. The company has its own maritime fleet and shipyard, the Nibulon Shipyard, and also developed its own river fleet to transport grain to export terminals.

In January 2017, the Mykolaiv Development Agency released a promo video of the city's investment potential.

The Mykolaiv Armored Factory (owned by Ukroboronprom) has been a large repair facility for Ukraine's military since the beginning of the Russo-Ukrainian War. Engineers at the plant designed an armored ambulance based on the BTR-70 to be used by the Ukrainian Armed Forces.

== Ukrainian military presence ==
Mykolaiv, being an important strategic city in southern Ukraine has a significant Ukrainian military presence, including the shipyards that build Ukraine's surface navy ships, the Mykolaiv Ukrainian Navy base, the "MARP" aircraft repair factory (Mykolaiv), and the Kulbakino army base (in the Mykolaiv Oblast, outside of the city of Mykolaiv).

Previously for many years after World War II the city had been home to the 92nd Guards Motor Rifle Division, the former 92nd Guards Rifle Division. The 79th Airmobile Brigade is based in the city.

== Transportation ==
Mykolaiv is one of Ukraine's most important transportation junctions. It is a major commercial river and sea port, and a major highway and rail junction. Mykolaiv also has a dual-function passenger and freight airport, but passenger service at the airport is not significant, compared to Ukraine's major airports. In addition to the airport and sea and river port, Mykolaiv has two train stations, and an intercity bus station.

=== Air ===
Mykolaiv Airport (IATA code NLV) is one of the largest and most technically well equipped airports in the South of Ukraine, which serves the city. The airport, located northwest of Mykolaiv, is mainly used for air freight and only has limited passenger service. Russian airline UTAir Aviation offers flights from Mykolaiv to Moscow (Vnukovo – VKO airport). In addition, there are one-hour passenger flights from Odesa (the nearest major airport) to Mykolaiv. Almost all airline passenger service in the South West of Ukraine (where Mykolaiv is located) is through Odesa International Airport: to reach Mykolaiv by airplane, tourists generally reach Odesa by plane, and then take a bus, taxi or train, for approximately 2 hours, to Mykolaiv. Odesa, the largest city in South West Ukraine, is 132 km (82 mi) from Mykolaiv.

Kulbakyno airport, also known as Mykolaiv, is a Class I military air base located just to the southeast of the city center, in Kulbakyno. It primarily supports wings of Sukhoi Su-24, Sukhoi Su-25, Sukhoi Su-27, and Mikoyan MiG-29.

=== Bus travel long distance ===
Mykolaiv is an 8.5-hour bus ride from Kyiv's main bus station. Ukrainian private national bus companies Gyunsel and Avtoluks operate overnight buses from Kyiv to Mykolaiv seven nights per week. The bus station in Mykolaiv is located at Prospekt (Avenue) Bohoyavlenskyi 21.

=== Roads ===
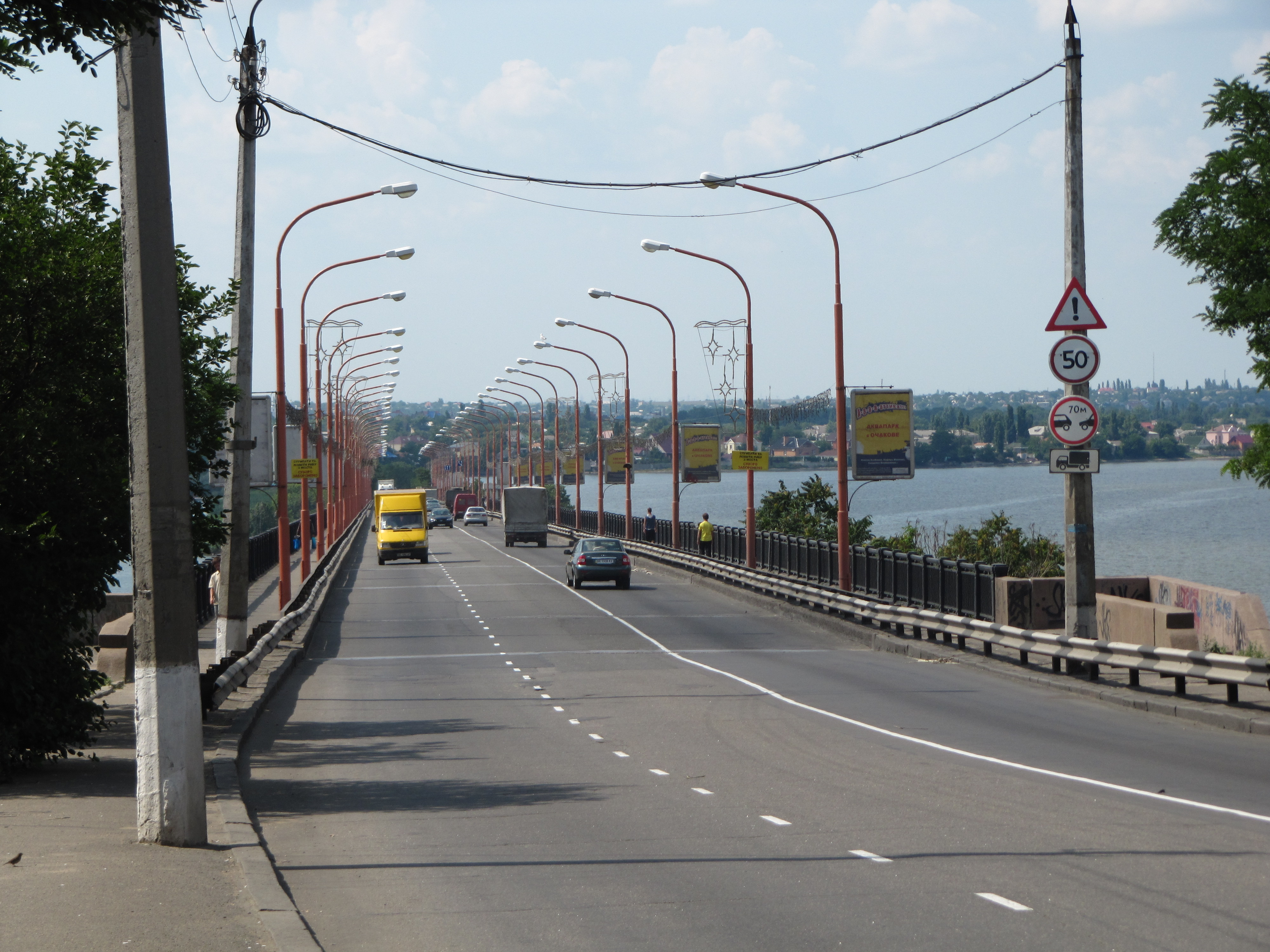
Road on Varvarivskyi bridge

The main north–south highway that passes through Mykolaiv is H (or M)-14.

The main East-West Highway that passes through Mykolaiv is E-58 M-14 (West and then South to Odesa), and South East to Kherson, a major port on the Dneper River, just before it flows into the Black Sea. The E-58 M-14 then continues East to the major industrial city and port in South Eastern Ukraine, Mariupol.

The main highways to and from Mykolaiv are from Kherson (65 km, 40 mi), Odesa (120 km, 75 mi), Uman (320 km, 199 mi), Chişinău (Kishniev), Moldova (325 km, 202 mi), the Crimean Peninsula (350 km, 217 mi), Kyiv (500 km, 311 mi), Kharkiv (520 km, 323 mi), and Lviv (350 km, 217 mi) in Western Ukraine. Ukraine's roads, including those leading from Mykolaiv, tend to be poorly maintained and can be very dangerous.

Roads through Mykolaiv include:

- the east–west Euro-Asian transport corridor: Odesa–Mykolaiv–Kherson–Dzhankoy–Kerch.
- the corridor Organization of the Black Sea Economic Cooperation: Reni–Izmail–Odesa–Mykolaiv–Kherson–Melitopol–Berdyansk–Mariupol–Novoazovsk.

the road M14 (Odesa–Novoazovsk), having an exit to the main highway M18 (Yalta–Simferopol–Kharkiv).

Roads to/from Mykolaiv include:

- R-06 (Ulianovka–Mykolaiv) with the highway M05 (Odesa–Kyiv), which, in turn, is linked with the highway M12 in the city district of Uman, having an exit on the route Lublin–Warsaw–Gdańsk (Poland). The length of the route Gdańsk–Mykolaiv is 1,530 kilometers (950 miles).
- N11 (Dnipro–Kryvyi Rih–Mykolaiv)
- N14 (Аleksandrovka–Kropyvnytskyi–Mykolaiv)

==== Bridges ====
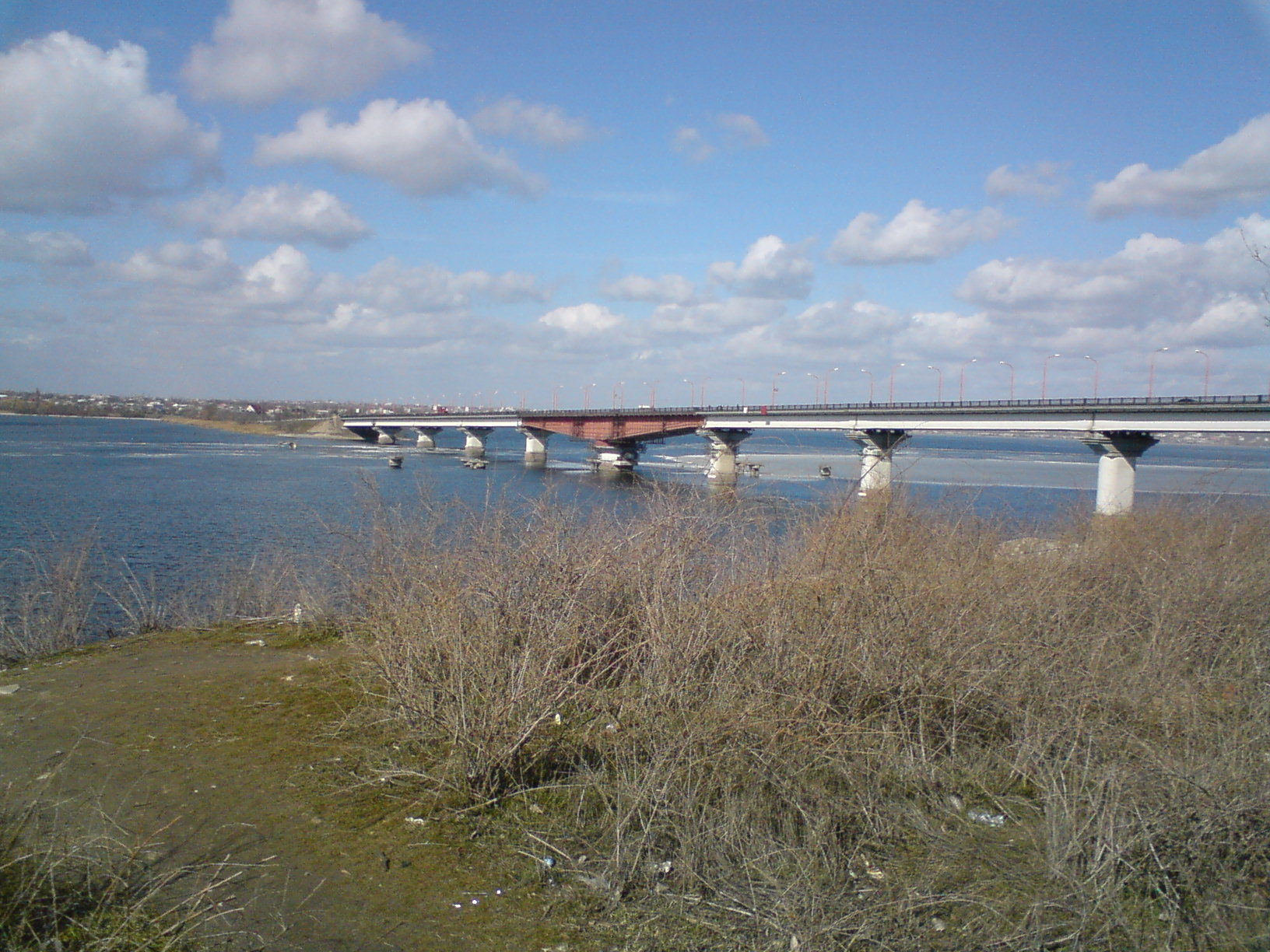
Varvarivskyi Bridge

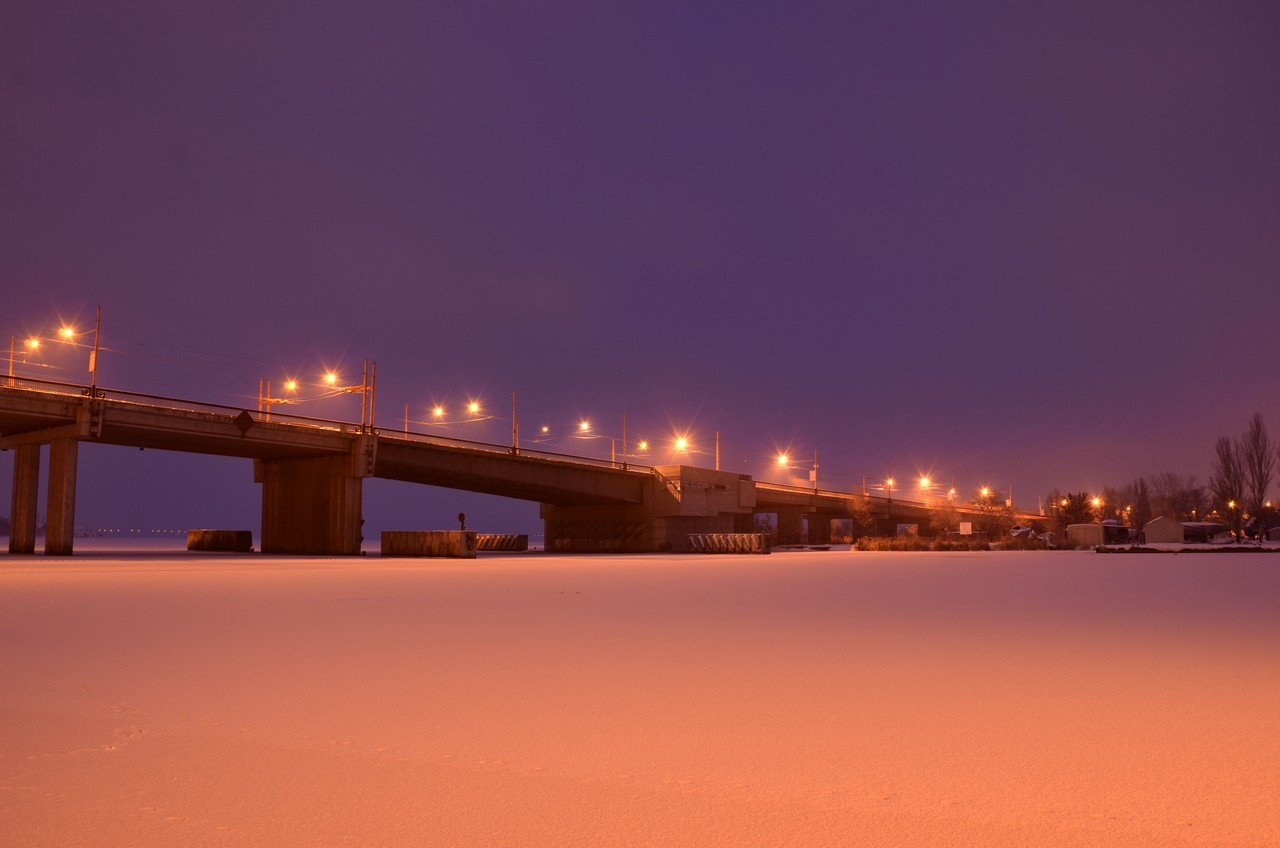
Inhul River bridge in Mykolaiv

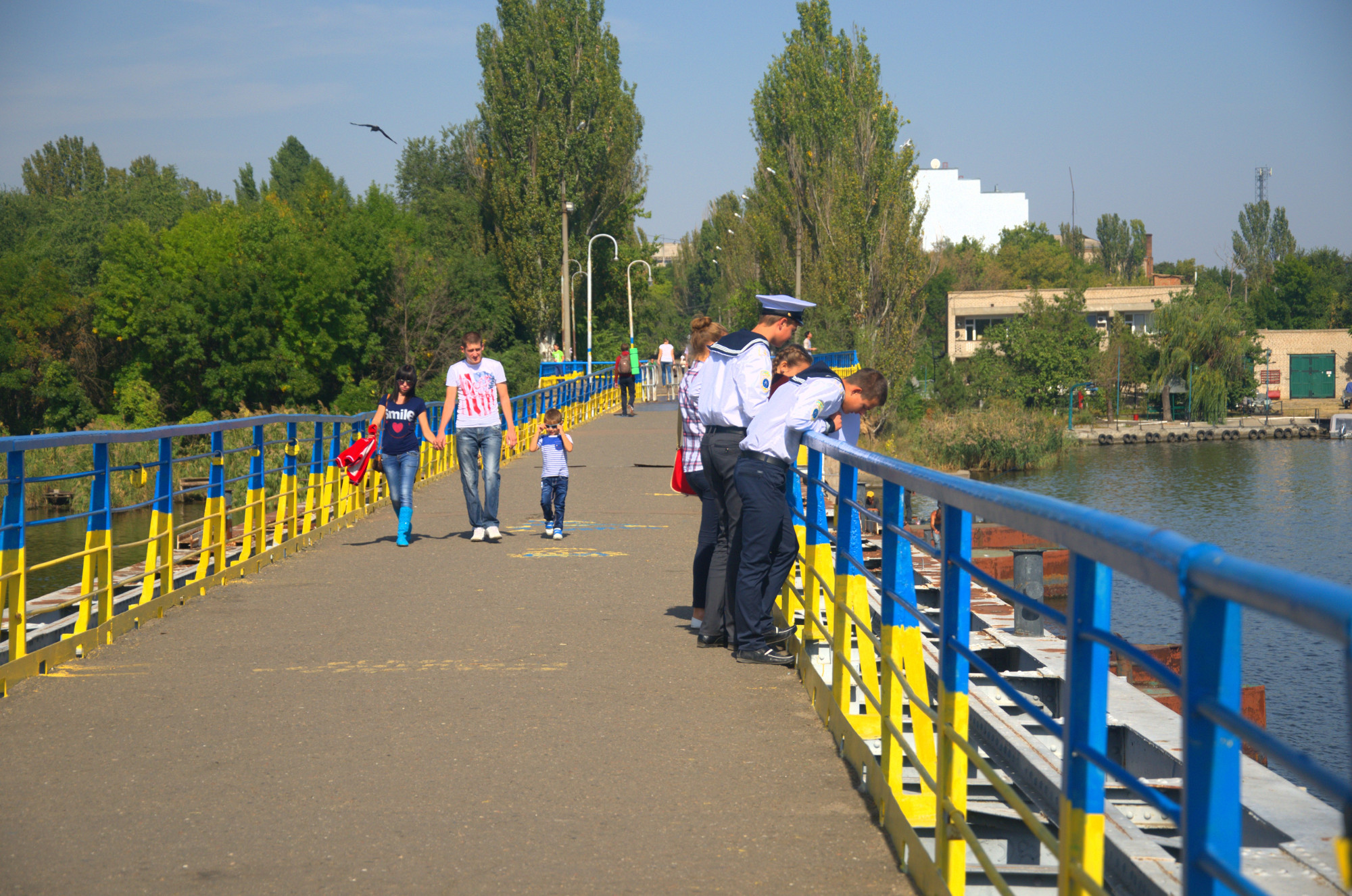
Old pedestrian bridge over Inhul River

Mykolaiv, being located at the confluence of two major rivers, has two main bridges. The Varvarivskyi Bridge over Southern Bug is a swing bridge with Europe's largest span (134 m, 440 ft). It is also the southernmost bridge over the Southern Bug. The bridge connects the North coast of Mykolaiv to its Tsentralnyi District, located on the West Bank of the river. The Odeske Highway crosses the bridge and then continues south-west to Odesa.

Another major bridge is the Inhul Bridge crossing the Inhul River. The bridge leads from the north coast of Mykolaiv, and goes north-northeast to the peninsula on the north side of the Inhul, just north of Mykolaiv. On the north Side of the Inhul River, the Heroyiv Stalingrada Highway crosses the bridge, streaming into Pushkinska Street on the other side.

=== Rail ===
Overnight train travel in sleeper-berth passenger trains is a very common way to travel long distances in Ukraine. There are nightly trains from Kyiv's main passenger train station to Mykolaiv.

In addition to Kyiv, trains from Mykolaiv regularly run to the two closest major cities to Mykolaiv: Odesa (south west of Mykolaiv); and Kherson (south of Mykolaiv). Direct trains to Moscow (26 hours), Kyiv (8-10), Lviv (18), Odesa (5), the Crimea (8 hours) depart every day. Train departures timetable. All trains have coach cars.

Mykolaiv's passenger train station is called Mykolaiv – Passenger. It at the intersection of Myru Avenue and Novozavodska Street 5 (in Ukraine street address numbers are placed after the street name). From the city square outside the railway station, buses depart to all other parts of Mykolaiv.

Mykolaiv's freight train station is called Mykolaiv-Gruzovoi (Freight). It is located at Pryvokzalna ploshcha (Square).

=== Water-borne travel ===
Though a major Ukrainian commercial sea port, Mykolaiv has no regular passenger water-borne service. Water transport is offered by three sea ports and one river port, and also by several terminals. The port is linked with the sea by Dnieper-Bug Estuary canal. The canal begins at the island Berezan and extends 44 kilometers (27 miles) until it reaches the port of Mykolaiv. The canal consistes of 13 tracks, six of which reach Dnieper Estuary, and the rest along the river Southern Bug. The width of the canal is 100 meters (330 feet). Its depth is 10.5 meters (34 feet).

Large ocean-going ships can reach Mykolaiv year round, via the Southern Bug River. The Southern Bug River, which flows into the Black Sea 65 km (40 mi) south of Mykolaiv, is 1.5 km (0.9 mi) wide in Mykolaiv. Mykolaiv's passenger river port is at Varvarovskii Spusk (Descent) 5.

The ports are:

- Mykolaiv Commercial Sea Port
- Specialized Seaport Olivia
- Dnieper-Bug Sea Commercial Port
- Mykolaiv River Port
- Sea Specialized Port Nika-Tera

=== Local transportation ===
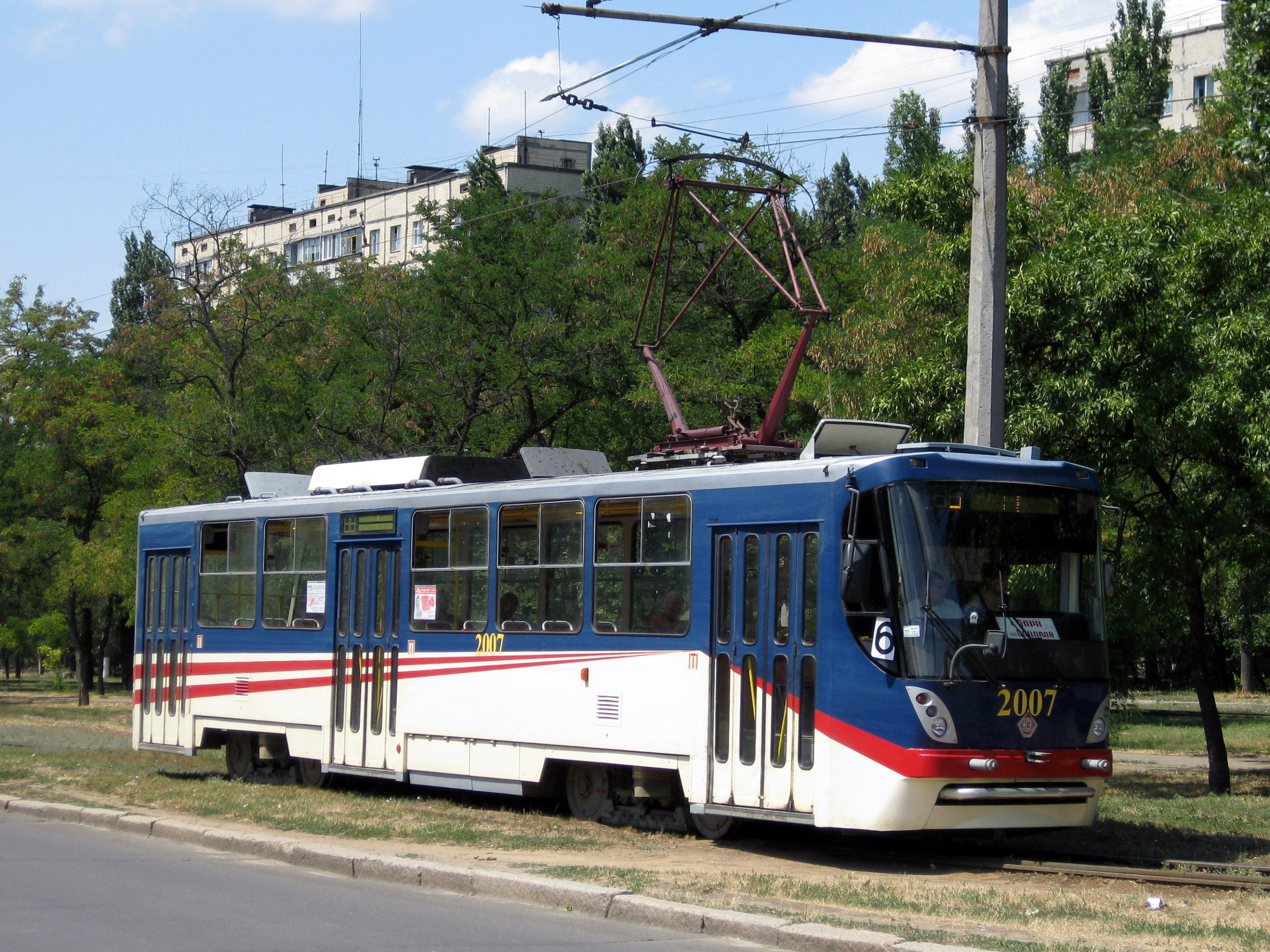
Tram in Mykolaiv

The main forms of city transport are fixed-route marshrutkas, buses, trolley buses, and trams.

==== Tram ====
The length of Mykolaiv's tram lines is 73 kilometers (45 miles). From 1897 until 1925 Mykolaiv's trams were pulled by horses. Trams began to be powered by electricity in 1915, and this has continued through the present. At their inception, the tracks were 1,000 mm (3 ft 3 3/8 in) metre gauge, but during the period from 1952 to 1972 they were switched to standard gauge.

==== Тrolleybus ====
The length of Mykolaiv's trolleybus lines is 59 kilometers (37 miles). Mykolaiv's trolleybuses have operated since 29 October 1967.

== Education ==
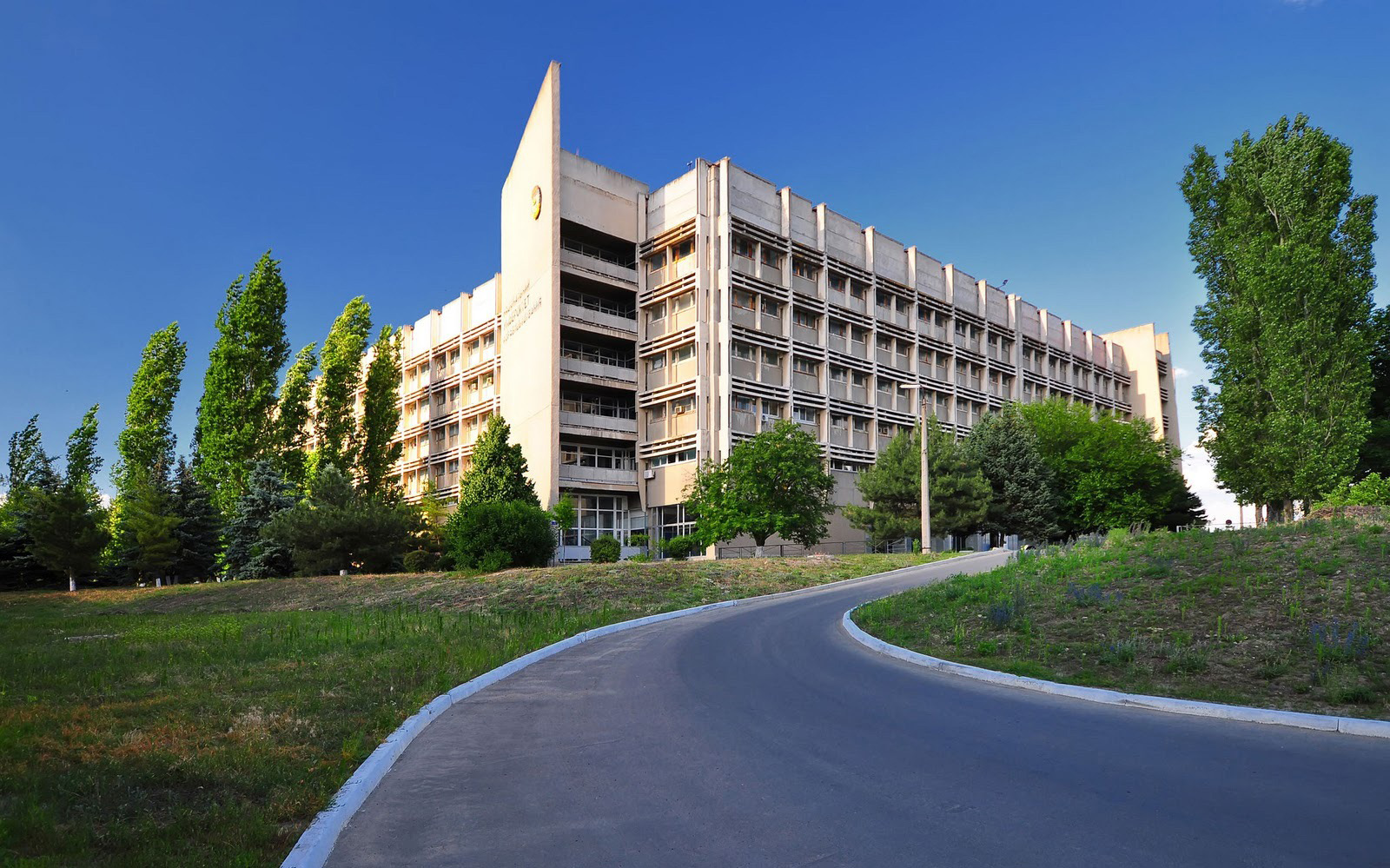
Admiral Makarov National University of Shipbuilding

There are several universities in Mykolaiv. The main universities are: Admiral Makarov National University of Shipbuilding (leading shipbuilding university in Ukraine), Petro Mohyla Black Sea State University, Sukhomlinsky National University of Mykolaiv, and Mykolaiv State Agrarian University.

Sukhomlinsky National University of Mykolaiv is the oldest university in Mykolaiv. The idea of the university foundation arose in the 1860s, but it was realized only on 18 July 1913, when the Mykolaiv Teacher's Institute was founded. Nowadays there are 7,000 students studying at the university, 300 teachers working at 36 departments. Annually, the university graduates 1,000 specialists and 60-70 undergraduates.

There are 10 higher education institutions in Mykolaiv of level III or IV accreditation. 65 general education schools, lycees, gymnasium schools, 3 evening schools, and 12 private learning institutions are in the city.

In a survey in June–July 2017, adult respondents reported the following educational levels:

- 5% primary or incomplete secondary education.
- 26% general secondary education.
- 31% vocational secondary education.
- 38% university education (including incomplete university education).

== Religion ==
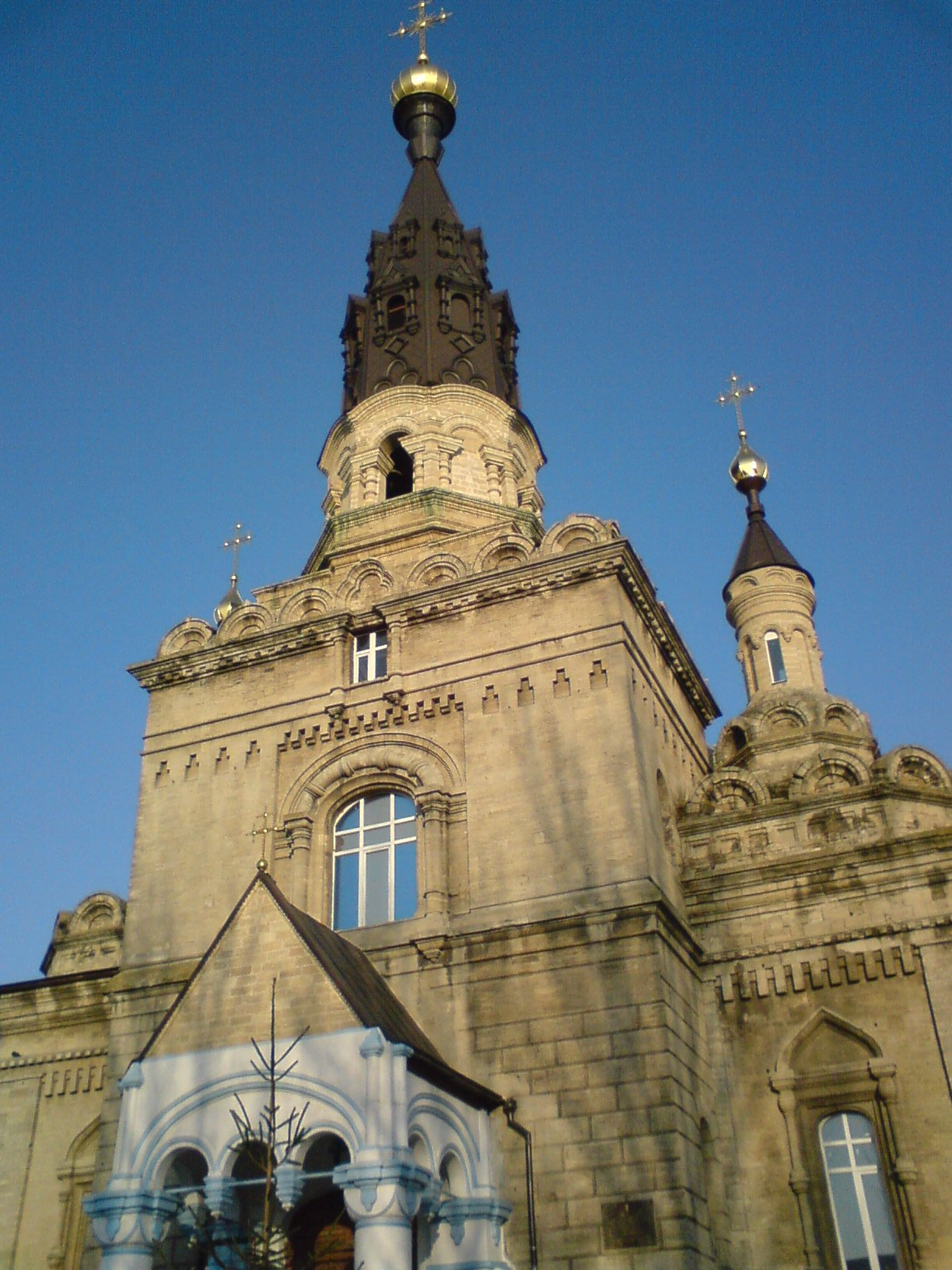
Orthodox Cathedral of Our Lady of Kasperov

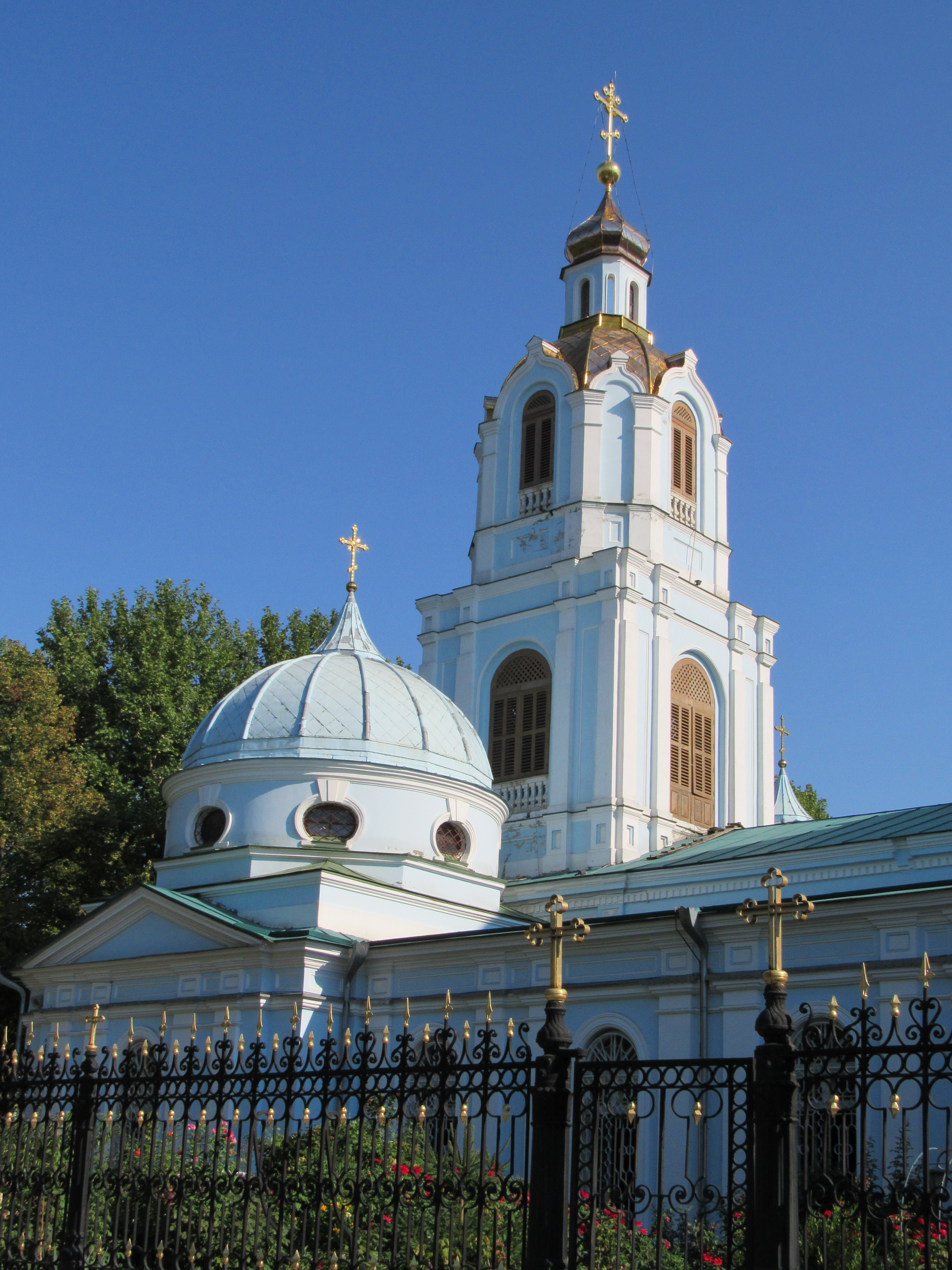
Orthodox Cathedral of the Nativity of the Theotokos

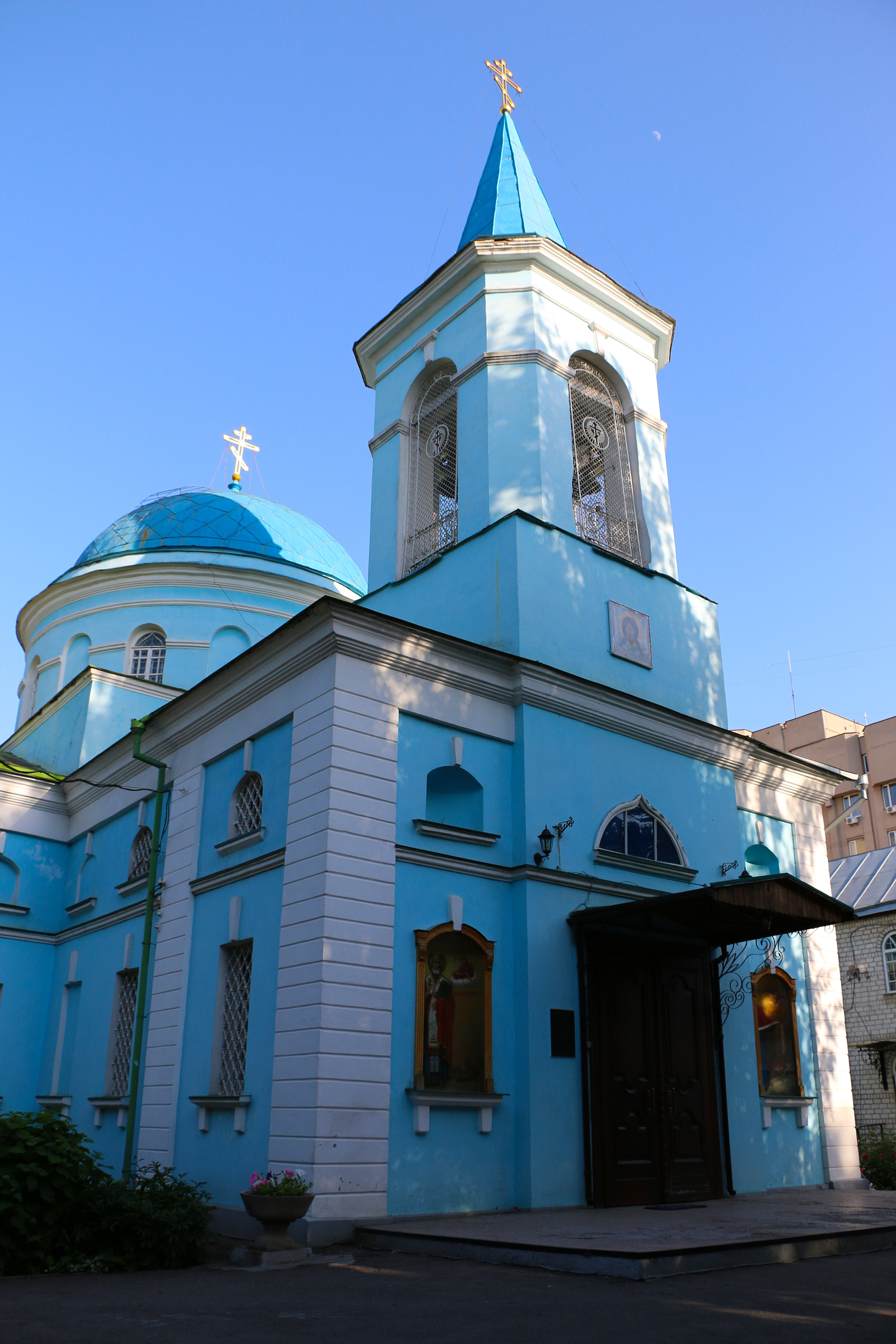
Orthodox Church of Saint Nicholas

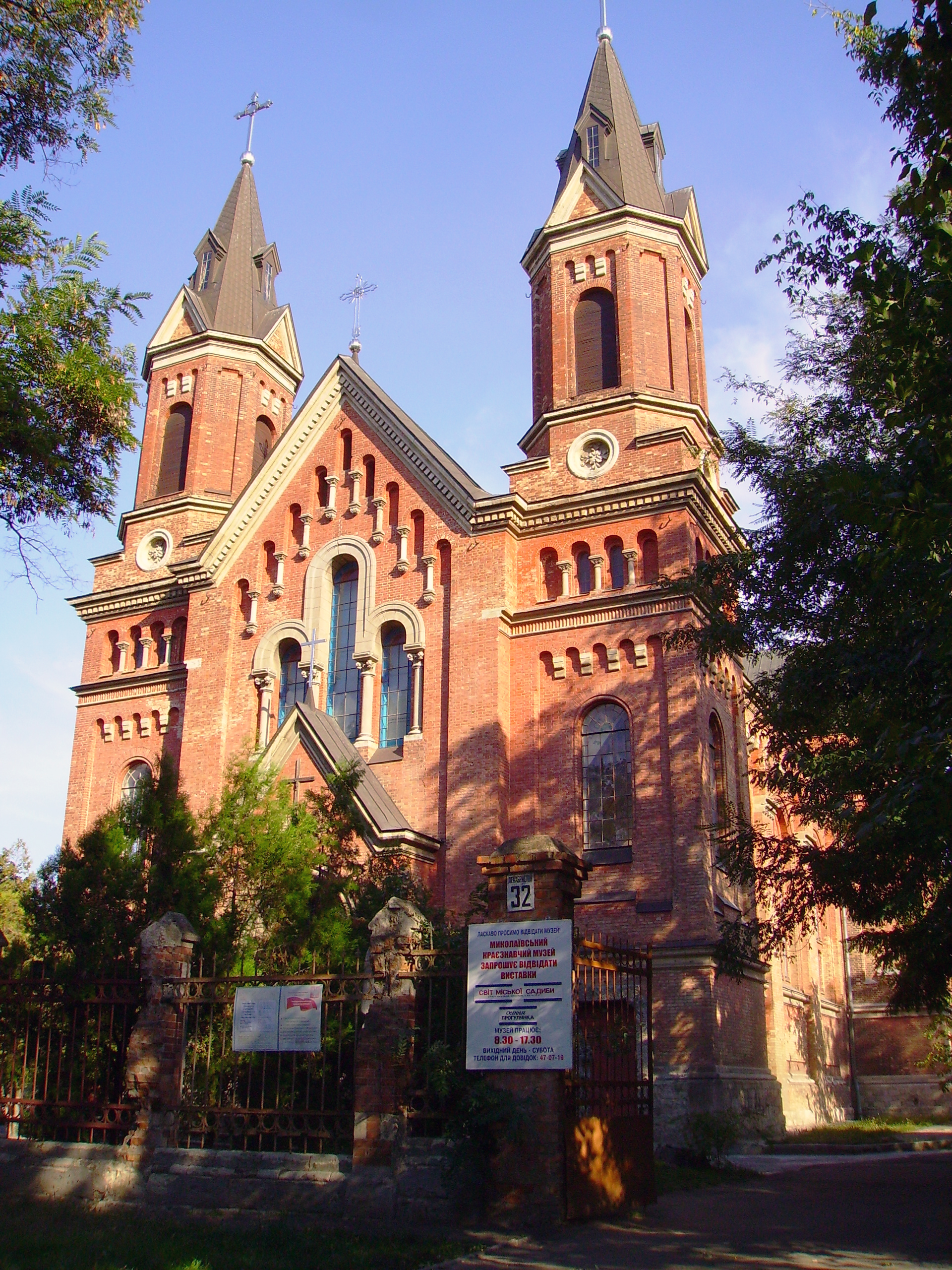
Roman Catholic Church of Saint Joseph

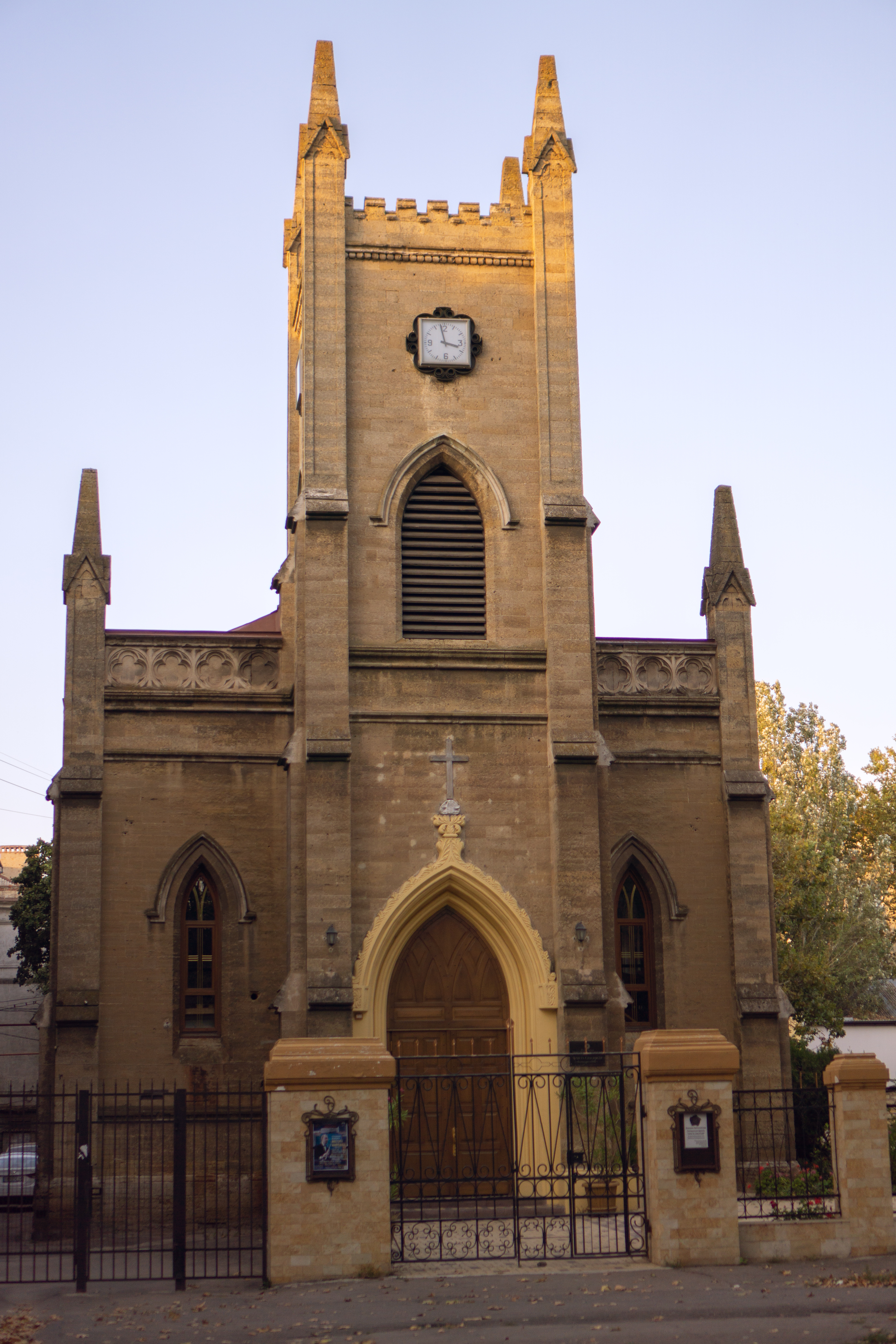
Lutheran Church of Christ the Redeemer

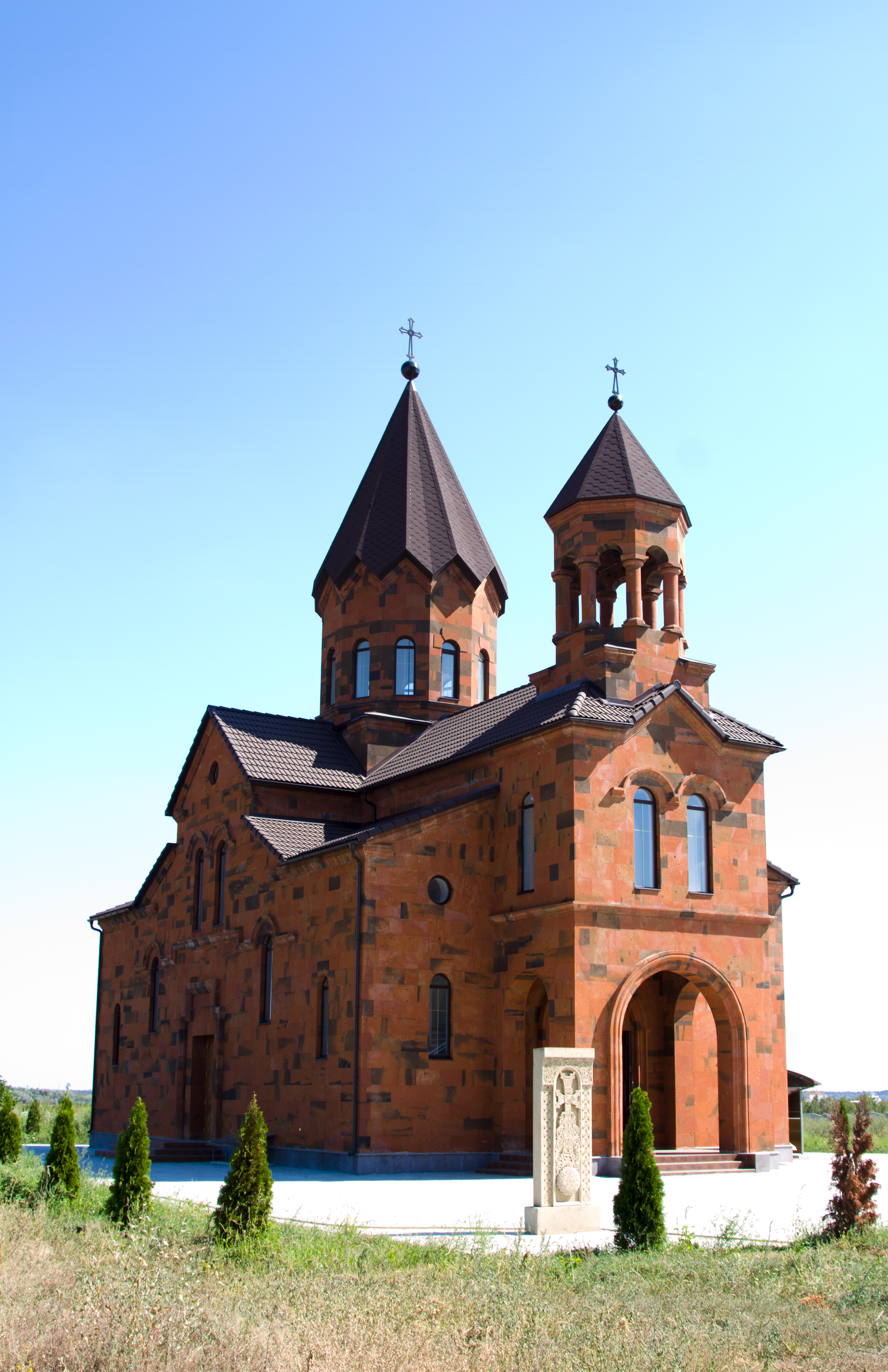
Armenian Church of Saint George

Mykolaiv is the headquarters of the Mykolaiv Episcopate of the Ukrainian Orthodox Church of the Moscow Patriarchate, which has 18 churches (temples) in the city.

Mykolaiv is also the headquarters of the Mykolaiv Episcopate of the Orthodox Church of Ukraine, which has succeeded the Kyiv Patriarchate.

A survey in June–July 2017 reported the following results for Mykolaiv:

- 19% Ukrainian Orthodox Church of the Kyivan Patriarchate.
- 16% Ukrainian Orthodox Church of the Moscow Patriarchate.
- 16% atheist.
- 4% belong to other religions.
- 44% believe in God, but do not belong to any religion.
- 2% found it difficult to answer.

== Culture ==
There are three performing arts theaters in Mykolaiv: the Academic Ukrainian Theater of Drama and Musical Comedy, the Mykolaiv State Puppet Theater, and the Mykolaiv Academic Art Russian Drama Theater. In addition, the Mykolaiv Oblast Philharmonic performs in the city.

Mykolaiv has the following museums: Mykolaiv Regional Museum of Local History, The Museum of Shipbuilding and Fleet, the Museum of the World War II Partisan Movement, the V. V. Vereshchagin Art Museum.

Three movie theaters operate in Mykolaiv: Rodina (Motherland), Pioneer, Multiplex. Movies shown include the latest Hollywood films dubbed into Ukrainian and modern Russian films.

== Media ==
Publications include Vecherniy Nikolayev (Evening Mykolaiv), Nikolaevsckie Novosti (Mykolaiv News), and Yuzhnaya Pravda (Southern Truth). Many publications have an Internet version, but exist in an independent Internet publication.

Television programs that are broadcast in Mykolaiv include movies, news, dramas (some of which originated in other countries, such as Mexico and the US, and are dubbed), cartoons, and professional sporting events such as Ukrainian football (soccer). Mykolaiv has the following TV channels: 1+1; 2+2; 5 Kanal; ICTV; Inter; Real Estate TV; Tonis: K1: Kanal Ukraina; Kultura (Ukraina); CTB; TV: TET; and TRK.

== Sports ==
Mykolaiv is represented within the Ukrainian Bandy and Rink-bandy Federation.

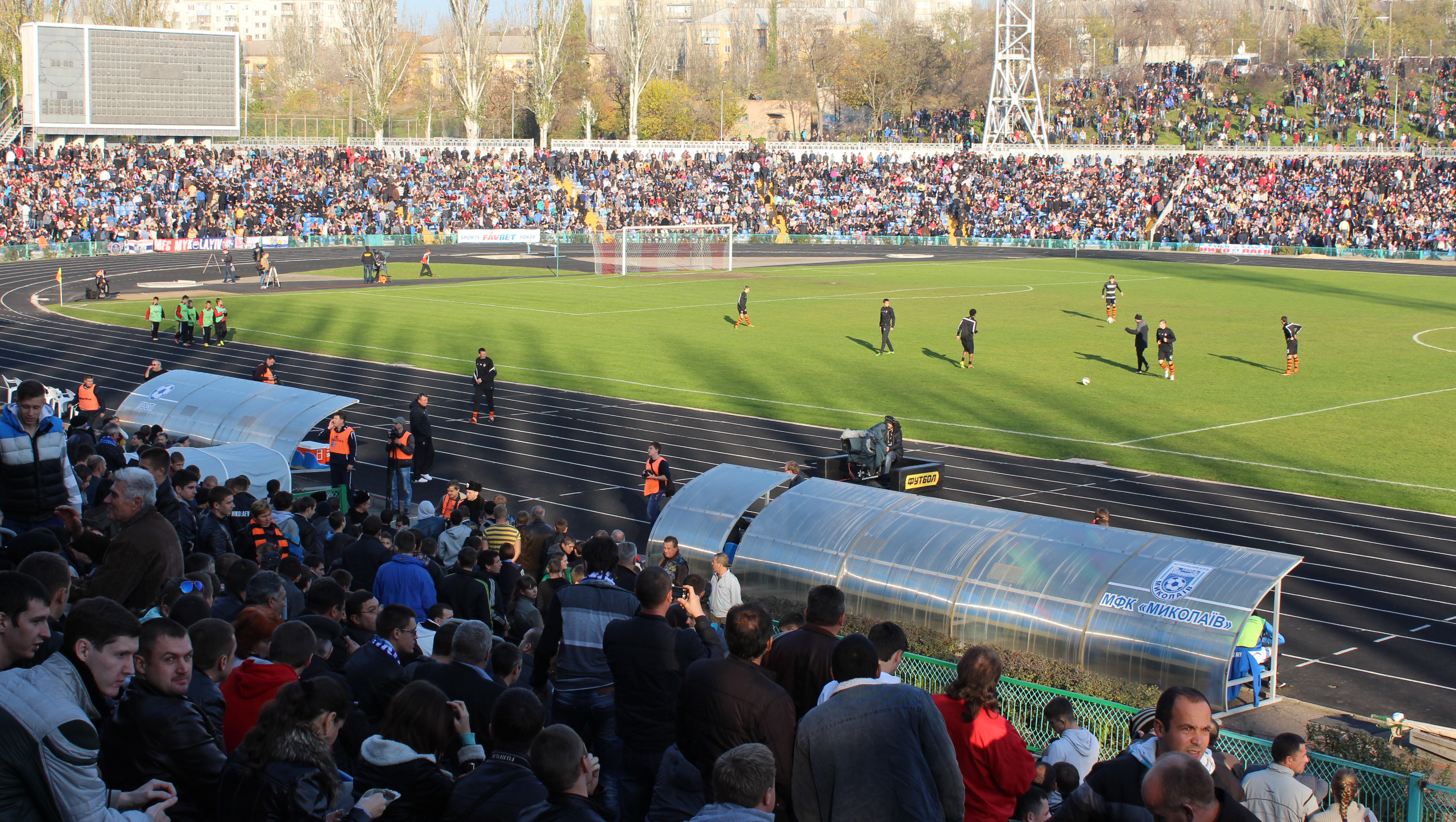
Central City Stadium, Mykolaiv

MFC Mykolaiv (Municipal Football Club "Mykolaiv", Ukrainian: Муніципальний футбольний клуб "Миколаїв") is a Ukrainian football club. Created back in 1920, it is one of the oldest sports clubs in Eastern Europe. The club existed as a football team of the Black Sea Shipyard. The club has been relegated three times from the Ukrainian Premier League. MFС Mykolaiv's best achievement in the Ukrainian Premier League was the 13th place (in 1994–95). Since the 2022 Russian aggression, the club has suspended its participation in professional competitions. Mykolaiv's main football stadium is Tsentralnyi Stadion. There are several smaller stadiums located within or nearby Mykolaiv, among which is the Stadion Parku Peremohy (Victory Park Stadium). As for other professional-level football clubs in the city, there were also FC Vast Mykolaiv, SC Enerhiya Mykolaiv, FC Sudnobudivnyk Mykolaiv. Besides those clubs, there are many smaller amateur-level clubs such as Varvarivka, Torpedo Mykolaiv, and many others.

Mykolaiv's professional basketball team is MBC Mykolaiv. The team has won or finished second or third in several international tournaments since 1988, and won the Ukrainian Championship in 1992. MBC Mykolaiv is part of the Ukrainian Basketball SuperLeague, which is the top professional basketball league in Ukraine.

The Mykolaiv students won two gold and bronze medals in the Ukrainian Academic Rowing Cup.

Among other types of sports, Mykolaiv hosts an American football team, Mykolaiv Vikings, and there are many enthusiasts of sailing sports.

== International relations ==
Mykolaiv is part of the International Black Sea Club and The World Council of Environmental Initiatives, since ICLEI).

Mykolaiv is twinned with:

- Aalborg, Denmark, since 2023
- Dezhou, China, since 2009
- Galați, Romania, since 2003
- Glasgow, Scotland, since 2024
- Kotka, Finland, since 2024
- (Georgia (country)) Kutaisi, Georgia, since 2012
- Nilüfer, Turkey, since 2001
- St Helier, Jersey, since 2023
- Tianjin, China, since 2001
- Tinos, Greece, since 2012
- Trieste, Italy, since 1996
- Weihai, China, since 2019
- Zhoushan, China, since 2016

== Notable people ==
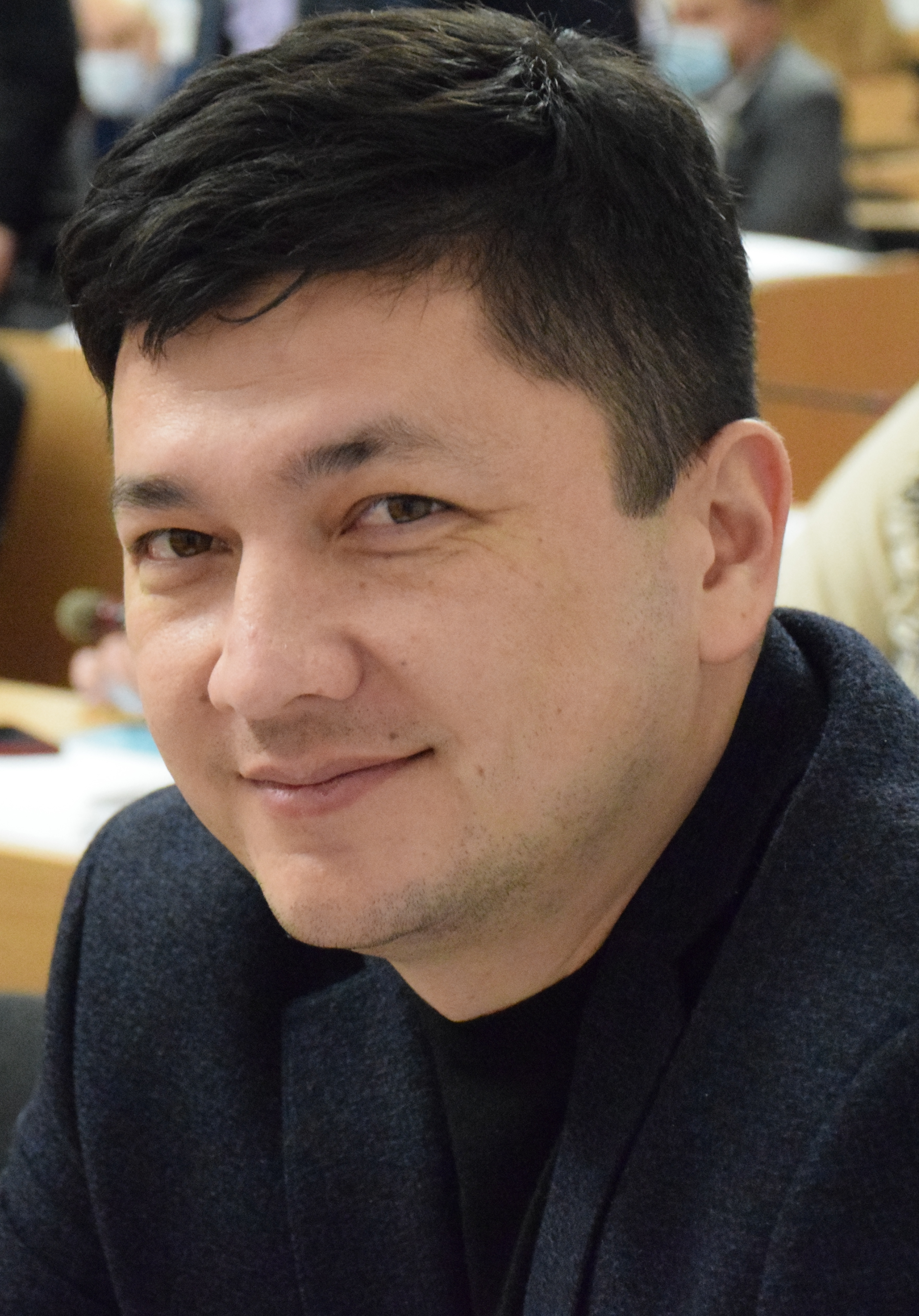
Vitaliy Kim, 2020

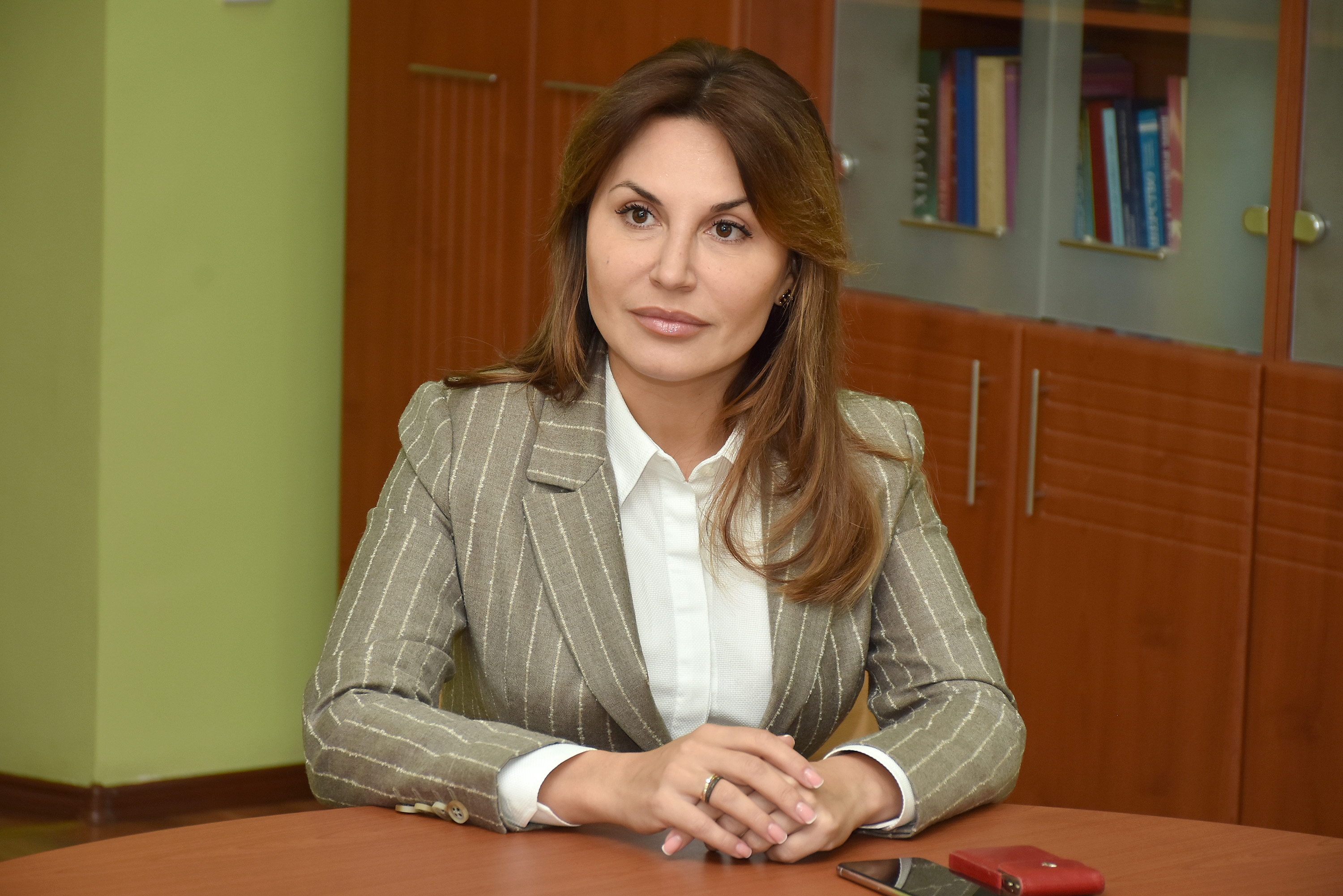
Iryna Sysoyenko, 2018

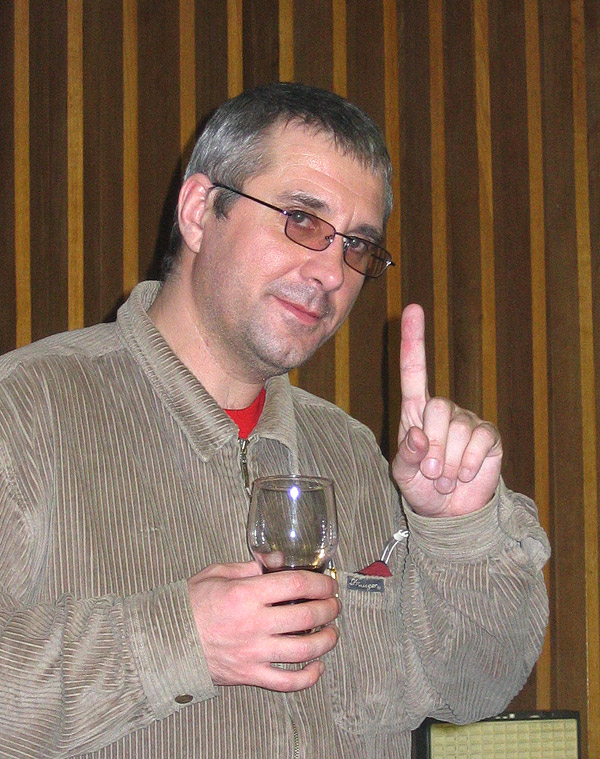
Vladimir Vasiliev, 2006

- Taisia Afonina (1913–1994), Soviet, Russian painter and watercolorist
- David Aizman (1869–1922), Russian-Jewish novelist and playwright
- Mykola Arkas (1853–1909), composer and historian
- Isaak Babel (1894–1940), journalist and writer, spent part of his childhood in Mykolaiv
- Paul A. Baran (1909–1964), American Marxist economist
- Sy Bartlett (1900–1978), Ukrainian-American author and screenwriter/producer of Hollywood films
- Yurii Biriukov (born 1974), businessman, politician and founder of Phoenix Wings
- Georgy Brusilov (1884–1914?), Arctic explorer
- Victor Buerger (Berger) (1904–1996), Ukrainian–British chess player
- Art Hodes (1904–1993), jazz pianist born in Mykolaiv, emigrated to Chicago as a child
- Svetlana Ischenko (born 1969), poet, stage actress, teacher and artist
- Boris Kamensky (1870–1949), Imperial Russian violinist
- Vitaliy Kim (born 1981), businessman and politician, the Governor of Mykolaiv Oblast since 2020
- Vsevolod Kniaziev (born 1979), judge and lawyer
- Stepan Makarov (1849–1904), commander of the Imperial Russian Navy, oceanographer, and author
- Max Maltzman (1899–1971), American architect noted during the Art Deco era
- Larisa Matveyeva (born 1969), poet, novelist, playwright and translator
- Serhii Melnychenko (born 1991), photographer, dancer, master of sports of the international class in ballroom dances
- Yuri Nosenko (1927–2008), KGB defector, born in Mykolaiv
- Maria Orska (1893–1930), actress of the German theater and cinema in the 1920s
- Galina Petrova (1920–1943), medic and Chief Petty Officer in the Black Sea Fleet during WWII
- Pinkhus Rovner (1875–1919), Jewish Ukrainian Bolshevik revolutionary
- Serhiy Ryzhkov (1958–2017), constructor, ecologist and academic professor
- Chana Schneerson (1880–1964), mother of the seventh Chabad-Lubavitch Rebbe, Rabbi Menachem Mendel Schneerson
- Rabbi Menachem Mendel Schneerson (1902–1994), the Chabad-Lubavitch Rebbe, born in Mykolaiv and lived there until 1907
- Aleksandra Sokolovskaya (1872–1938), Russian Marxist revolutionary and Leon Trotsky's first wife
- African Spir (1837–1890), philosopher, studied in Mykolaiv
- Grigory Stelmakh (1900–1942), Soviet military commander
- Iryna Sysoyenko (born 1982), politician and lawyer
- Meir Teomi (1898–1947), Ukrainian-born actor and immigrant to Mandatory Palestine who was murdered during a terrorist attack
- Leon Trotsky (1879–1940), revolutionary, studied in Mykolaiv
- Konstantin Umansky (1902–1945), Soviet diplomat, editor, journalist, and artist
- Vladimir Vasilyev (born 1967), Russian science fiction writer and musician
- Pyotr Veinberg (1831–1908), Russian Empire poet, translator, journalist, and literary historian
- Oleg Voloshyn (born 1981), Russian-Ukrainian journalist, political pundit, and former government official
- Sergei Zakharov (1950–2019), Russian singer with a rare lyrical baritone
- Hennadiy Zubko (born 1967), Ukrainian politician
- Oleksandr Zubov, (born 1983), Ukrainian chess player, born in Mykolaiv

=== Sports ===
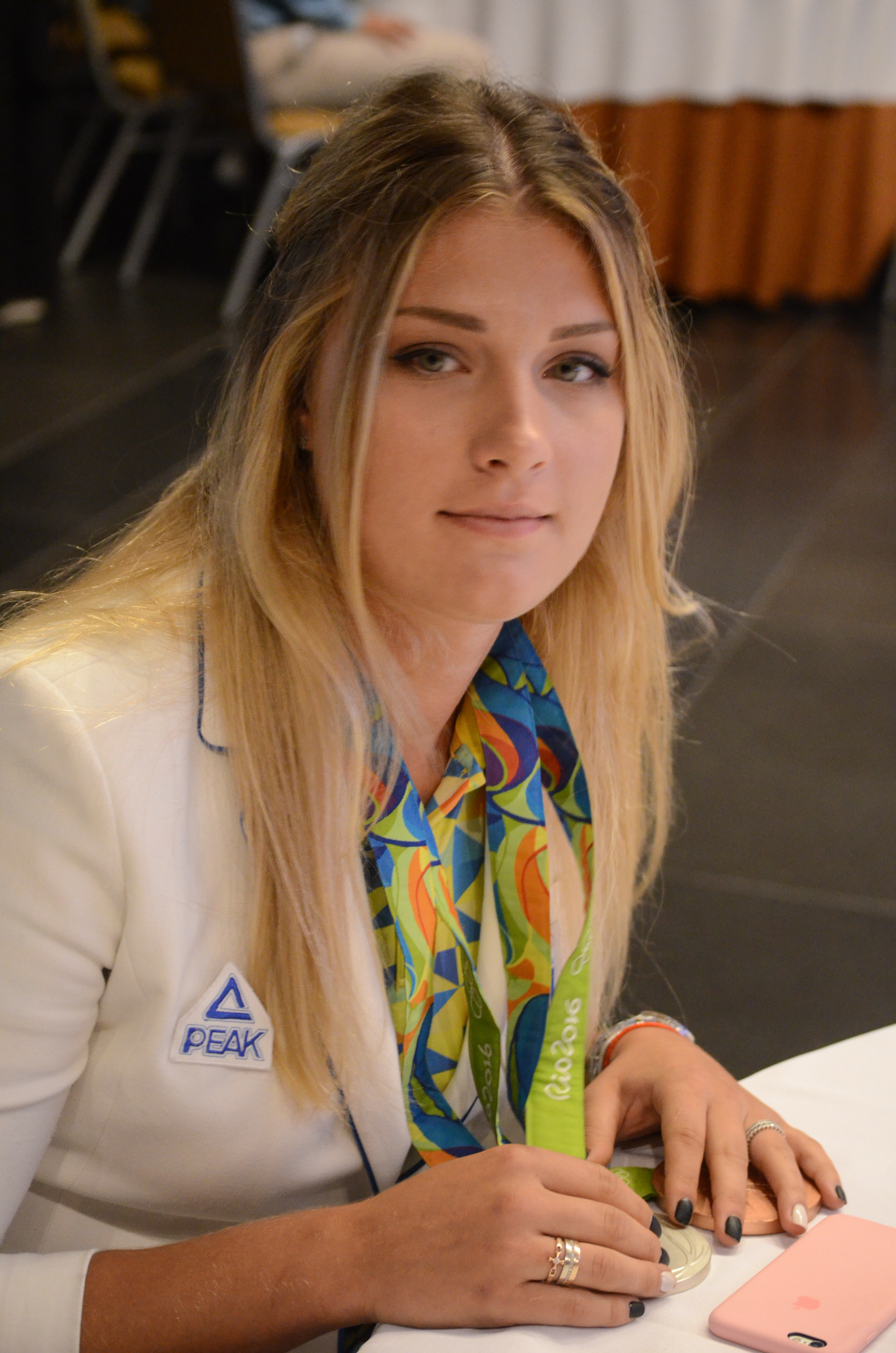
Olha Kharlan, 2016

- Svitlana Demchenko (born 2003) – chess player, Woman International Master, member of the Canadian Women's Chess Olympiad team.
- Valeriy Dymo (born 1985) – swimmer who competed in the 2004, 2008 and the 2012 Summer Olympics
- Olha Kharlan (born 1990) – sabre fencer; European, world, and Olympic champion
- Olena Khomrova (born 1987) – sabre fencer, team gold medalist at the 2008 Summer Olympics.
- Nikita Rukavytsya (born 1987), professional footballer for Israeli Premier League club Maccabi Haifa and the Australia national team.
- Oleksiy Sereda (born 2005) – diver; at age 13, he was the 2019 European champion in the 10 metre platform event, the youngest ever to win this gold medal; lives in Mykolaiv
- Oxana Tsyhuleva (born 1973) – trampolinist, silver medalist at the 2000 Summer Olympics

== See also ==
- Black Sea Shipyard
- Mykolayiv Shipyard
- Okean Shipyard
