= Houde =

Houde may refer to:

- Houde (surname), a French surname
- Houde, Togo, a village in Togo
- Houde Bimax, a French ultralight aircraft
- Houde Engineering, a hydraulic shock absorber manufacturer that became Houdaille Industries
- Houde Institute, a Beijing think tank
- Houde Speedmax, a French ultralight aircraft
