= Pilia (disambiguation) =

Pilia is a genus of spider. Pilia may also refer to

- Pilia, Togo, a village
- Pilia (gens), a plebeian family in ancient Rome
- Pilia (surname)
