= Monuments of national significance in Mykolaiv Oblast =

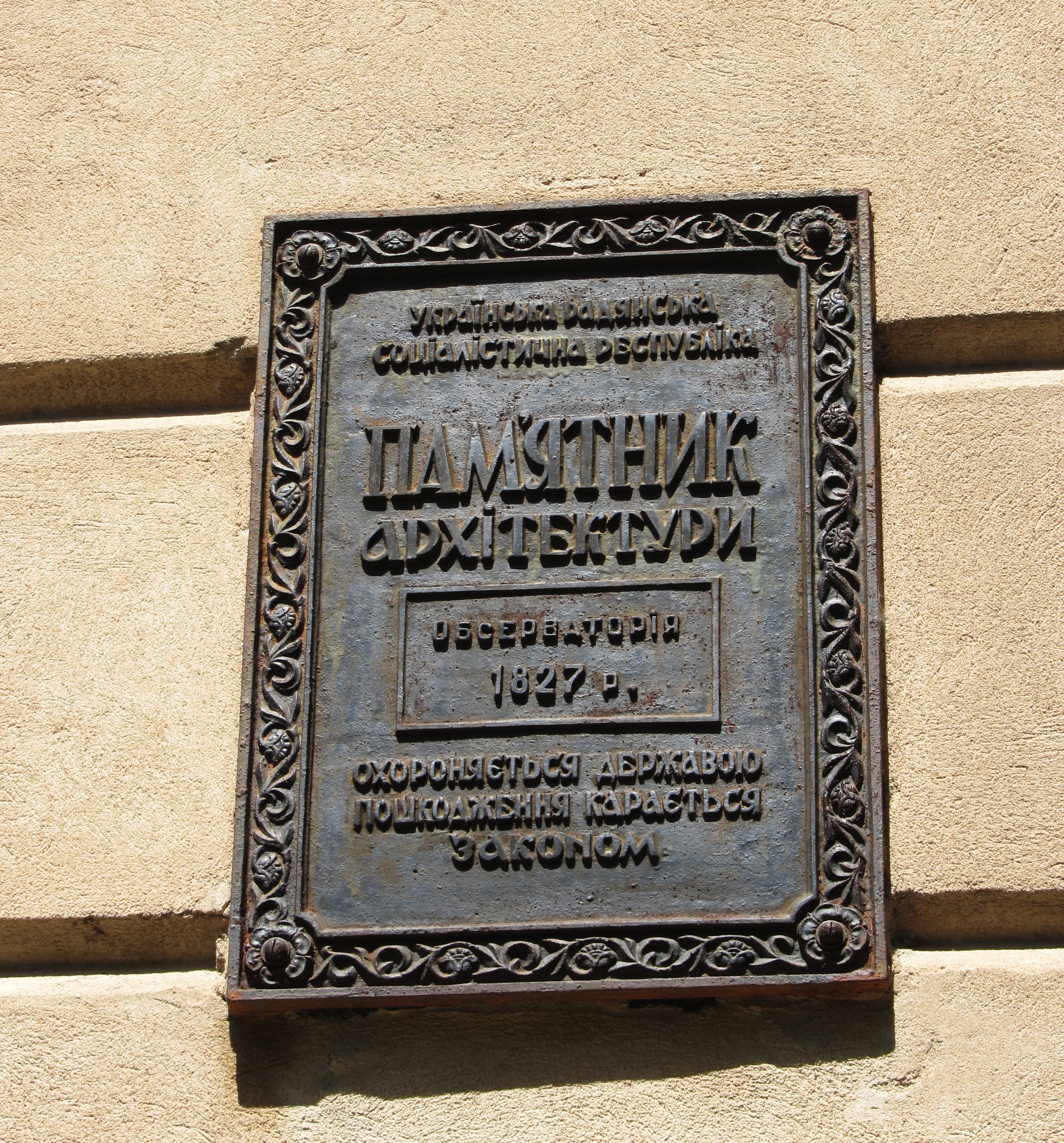
Soviet-era cultural heritage plaque of the Mykolaiv Observatory

The State Register of Immovable Monuments of Ukraine classifies cultural heritage monuments as either of local or national significance. (Note: 'Monuments of national significance' may also be translated as 'monuments of national importance'; Ukrainian: пам'ятки національного значення) To be classified as nationally significant, a monument must have had a substantial impact on Ukraine's culture, been associated with major historical events or individuals who shaped national culture, represented a masterpiece of creative genius, or embodied a disappeared civilisation or disappeared artistic style. Monuments of national significance are inscribed on the register by the Cabinet of Ministers, and are protected and maintained by the Ministry of Culture. All listed monuments belong to at least one of the following categories: archaeology, history, monumental art, architecture, urban planning, garden and park art, landscape, or science and technology. (Note: The categories are defined as such: Archaeological monuments are underground or underwater remains of human activity that bear testimony to the origin or development of civilisation.; Historic monuments are buildings, structures, burials, and other sites associated with important historical events or the lives and activities of prominent individuals.; Monuments of monumental art are works of fine art.; Architectural monuments are buildings and structures that retain full or partial authenticity and express characteristics of a particular culture, era, style, construction technique, or represent works of renowned architects.; Urban planning monuments are historic neighbourhoods, streets, squares, or ensembles with preserved spatial layouts and architectural integrity.; Monuments of garden and park art combine park construction with natural or anthropogenic landscapes.; Landscape monuments are natural areas possessing historical value.; Monuments of science and technology are industrial, engineering, or scientific sites that reflect the scientific and technological development of an era or discipline.)

The first attempts to establish registers of protected buildings were undertaken in 1917 and 1918 by the Ukrainian People's Republic. These efforts continued in the 1920s in Soviet Ukraine, culminating in the listing of thousands of monuments, but were halted in the 1930s with the dissolution of relevant institutions and the active destruction of cultural—particularly religious—heritage. The listing of cultural heritage monuments in the region was renewed in 1956. A list of architectural monuments was approved in 1963, followed by a separate list of artistic, historic, and archaeological monuments in 1965. Both lists remained in use after Ukraine declared independence in 1991. On 8 June 2000, the State Register of Immovable Monuments was established with the adoption of the law On the Protection of Cultural Heritage. All entries from the Soviet-era list of artistic, historic, and archaeological monuments were transferred to the new register on 14 September 2009. The transfer of monuments from the Soviet architectural register, however, has proceeded more slowly and remains incomplete as of 2026, although the process has accelerated in recent years. At the same time, a number of sites have been deprived of their protected status to comply with decommunisation and derussification laws in effect since 2015 and 2023, respectively.

Mykolaiv Oblast is located in southern Ukraine and contains 41 monuments of national significance. (Note: No monuments of national significance in the oblast remain on the Soviet-era register.) It is divided into four raions (districts) – Bashtanka, Mykolaiv, Pervomaisk, and Voznesensk – which include 3, 24, 5, and 9 monuments of national significance, respectively. Of the total, 28 are classified as archaeological monuments, 11 as architectural, 3 as historic, and 1 as landscape, with 1 monument belonging to multiple categories. The archaeological monuments cover time periods from the Paleolithic (c. 2.6 million – c. 12,000 years ago) to the Zaporozhian Cossack era (16th–18th centuries). The latest inscriptions date to June 2024.

== Bashtanka Raion ==
Monuments of national significance in Bashtanka Raion
Name (Note: The names listed are unofficial translations as the register is only available in Ukrainian. The official Ukrainian names are shown below each translation, with links to the corresponding Ukrainian Wikipedia articles if applicable.)	Location	Date constructed (Note: Datings of the monuments as indicated on the register)	Date designated (Note: For monuments previously listed on a Soviet-era register, the date of transfer to the modern register is indicated.)	Coordinates	Type	Protection number (Note: Every monument is assigned a unique protection number, and those of national significance located in Mykolaiv Oblast start with the digits 14.)	Ref.
Kurgan cemetery Курганний могильник	Kostiantynivka	3rd–1st millennia BCE	14 September 2009	47.34930°N 32.28376°E	Archaeological	140010-Н	
Dwelling Стоянка	Lukianivka (Note: Mentioned on the register under its pre-2016 name Lenine)	9th–7th centuries BCE	14 September 2009	47.47930°N 32.11853°E	Archaeological	140011-Н	
Hillfort Городище	Oleksandrivka	9th century BCE – 4th century CE	14 September 2009	46.84927°N 32.77118°E	Archaeological	140030-Н	

== Mykolaiv Raion ==
Monuments of national significance in Mykolaiv Raion
Name	Location	Date constructed	Date designated	Coordinates	Type	Protection number	Photo	Ref.
Hillfort Городище	Berezan Island	9th century BCE – 4th century CE	14 September 2009	46.59874°N 31.41184°E	Archaeological	140025-Н	More images	
Settlement "Pitukhivka I" Поселення "Пітухівка I"	Dmytrivka	9th century BCE – 4th century CE	14 September 2009	46.62521°N 31.77336°E	Archaeological	140022-Н		
Settlement "Pitukhivka II" Поселення "Пітухівка II"	Dmytrivka	9th century BCE – 4th century CE	14 September 2009	46.62664°N 31.76308°E	Archaeological	140023-Н		
Hillfort-fortress Городище-фортеця	Dmytrivka	9th century BCE – 4th century CE, 5th–17th centuries	14 September 2009	46.62549°N 31.83334°E	Archaeological	140024-Н		
Settlement Поселення	Kalynivka (Note: Mentioned on the register under its pre-2016 name Kimivka)	9th century BCE – 4th century CE	14 September 2009	46.91848°N 31.53831°E	Archaeological	140012-Н		
Kurgan cemetery Курганний могильний	Kalynivka	3rd–1st millennia BCE	14 September 2009	46.94825°N 31.51488°E	Archaeological	140013-Н		
Hillfort Городище	Kozyrka	9th century BCE – 4th century CE	14 September 2009	46.79882°N 31.87503°E	Archaeological	140026-Н		
Hillfort Городище	Matiiasove	9th century BCE – 4th century CE	14 September 2009	46.72923°N 31.50374°E	Archaeological	140014-Н		
Hillfort Городище	Mykolaiv	9th century BCE – 4th century CE	14 September 2009	46.89741°N 32.01569°E	Archaeological	140002-Н	More images	
Settlement and necropolis "Didova Khata I" Поселення і некрополь "Дідова Хата I"	Mykolaiv	9th century BCE – 4th century CE	14 September 2009	46.92111°N 31.95520°E	Archaeological	140003-Н		
Roman military camp "Didova Khata III" Римський військовий табір "Дідова Хата III"	Mykolaiv	9th century BCE – 4th century CE	14 September 2009	46.91763°N 31.96165°E	Archaeological	140004-Н		
Settlement-hillfort Поселення-городище	Mykolaiv	9th century BCE – 4th century CE	14 September 2009	46.97346°N 32.00605°E	Archaeological	140005-Н		
Burial vaults of the composer and ethnographer M. M. Arkas, the founder of the shipyard in Mykolaiv M. L. Faleev Могили-склепи композитора та етнографа М. М. Аркаса, засновника корабельні у м. Миколаєві М. Л. Фалеєва	Mykolaiv	1792, 1909	14 September 2009	46.96826°N 32.03164°E	Historic	140006-Н	More images	
Burial vault of the scientist, inventor, and public figure V. N. Karazin Могила-склеп вченого, винахідника і громадського діяча В. Н. Каразіна	Mykolaiv	1842, 1982	14 September 2009	46.96827°N 32.03308°E	Historic	140007-Н	More images	
Marine Gymnasium Морська гімназія	Mykolaiv	1850	21 June 2024	46.97153°N 32.00585°E	Architectural	140031	More images	
Old fleet barracks (buildings 1, 2) (Note: One of the buildings now houses the Mykolaiv Regional Museum of Local History.) Старофлотські казарми (корпус 1, 2)	Mykolaiv	1850	21 June 2024	46.97206°N 32.00674°E	Architectural	140032	More images	
Observatory Обсерваторія	Mykolaiv	1827	21 June 2024	46.97286°N 31.97284°E	Architectural	140033	More images	
St Nicholas Church Миколаївська церква	Mykolaiv	1817	21 June 2024	46.97490°N 31.98925°E	Architectural	140034	More images	
Officers' Assembly Офіцерське зібрання	Mykolaiv	1820	21 June 2024	46.97922°N 31.98139°E	Architectural	140035	More images	
Fleet Headquarters Building (Note: The building now houses the Museum of Shipbuilding and the Fleet.) Будинок штабу флоту	Mykolaiv	1796	21 June 2024	46.97819°N 31.98591°E	Architectural	140036	More images	
Gate and walls of the shipyard Брама та мури суднобудівної вахти	Mykolaiv	1848	21 June 2024	46.97277°N 32.00790°E	Architectural	140037	More images	
Settlement Поселення	Ternuvate	2nd millennium – 10th century BCE	14 September 2009	47.19212°N 31.79776°E	Archaeological	140021-Н		
St Nicholas Church Миколаївська церква	Ochakiv	1818	21 June 2024	46.60808°N 31.54791°E	Architectural	140038	More images	
Ancient city of Olbia Стародавнє місто Ольвія	Parutyne	9th century BCE – 4th century CE	14 September 2009	46.68995°N 31.90275°E	Archaeological	140027-Н	More images	

== Pervomaisk Raion ==
Monuments of national significance in Pervomaisk Raion
Name	Location	Date constructed	Date designated	Coordinates	Type	Protection number	Photo	Ref.
Settlement Поселення	Hrushivka, Myhiia	4th–3rd millennia BCE, 9th–13th centuries	14 September 2009	48.02899°N 30.95460°E	Archaeological	140028-Н		
St Catherine's Church Катерининська церква	Katerynka	18th century	21 June 2024	47.92282°N 30.75785°E	Architectural	140040	More images	
Kurgan cemetery Курганний могильник	Kinetspil	3rd millennium BCE – 1st millennium CE	14 September 2009	48.00977°N 30.76851°E	Archaeological	140029-Н		
Intercession Church and bell tower Покровська церква та дзвіниця	Pervomaisk	1805	21 June 2024	48.04639°N 30.83818°E	Architectural	140039	More images	
Settlement Поселення	Semenivka	6th–3rd millennia BCE	14 September 2009	47.96769°N 31.04068°E	Archaeological	140009-Н		

== Voznesensk Raion ==
Monuments of national significance in Voznesensk Raion
Name	Location	Date constructed	Date designated	Coordinates	Type	Protection number	Photo	Ref.
Dwelling Стоянка	Anetivka	1.5 million – 10,000 BCE	14 September 2009	47.70279°N 31.12321°E	Archaeological	140020-Н		
Historical landscape of the centre of Buh Hard palanka of the Zaporozhian Host Історичний ландшафт центру Буго-Гардівської паланки Війська Запорозького	Bohdanivka, Kostiantynivka, Pivdennoukrainsk (Note: Mentioned on the register under its pre-2024 name Yuzhnoukrainsk)	7th–6th millennia BCE, 5th–4th millennia BCE, 3rd–2nd millennia BCE, 12th–13th centuries, 16th–18th centuries	14 September 2009	47.81811°N 31.16714°E	Archaeological, historic, landscape	140001-Н	More images	
Settlement Поселення	Kostiantynivka	6th–3rd millennia BCE, 2nd millennium – 10th century BCE, 5th–9th centuries	14 September 2009	47.81107°N 31.18003°E	Archaeological	140008-Н		
Fortress Фортеця	Kremenivka	5th–9th centuries	14 September 2009	47.37568°N 31.16939°E	Archaeological	140017-Н		
Kurgan Курган	Liudmylivka	3rd millennium BCE – 1st millennium	14 September 2009	48.02680°N 31.45020°E	Archaeological	140015-Н		
Dwelling Стоянка	Oleksandrivka	9th–7th millennia BCE	14 September 2009	47.66881°N 31.25442°E	Archaeological	140019-Н		
Hillfort Городище	Pokrovka	9th century BCE – 4th century CE	14 September 2009	47.37366°N 31.55733°E	Archaeological	140018-Н		
Dwelling Стоянка	Ukrainets	1.5 million – 10,000 BCE	14 September 2009	47.78342°N 31.55409°E	Archaeological	140016-Н		
Gazebo Альтанка	Voznesensk	1837	21 June 2024	47.56793°N 31.33157°E	Architectural	140041	More images	

== See also ==
- List of historic reserves in Ukraine
- Ukrainian architecture
