= Animene Tie =

- Location in Togo
- Coordinates: 10°2′N 1°8′E
- Country: Togo
- Region: Kara Region
- Prefecture: Kéran

Animene Tie is a village in the Kara Region of northern Togo. Nearby towns and villages include Dissani (1.4 nm), Koudan-Mangou (5.1 nm), Selebino (4.4 nm), Koutougou (4.7 nm), Kouba Tie (1.4 nm) and Sola (2.0 nm) .
