= Palanka =

Palanka can refer to:

== Places ==
- Palanka, Brčko District, Bosnia and Herzegovina
- Palanka, Gračac, Lika, Croatia
- Kriva Palanka Municipality, North Macedonia
  - Kriva Palanka
- Palanca, Bacău (Hungarian: Palánka), Western Moldavia, Romania
- Bačka Palanka, Vojvodina, Serbia
- Banatska Palanka, Vojvodina, Serbia
- Bela Palanka, Pirot, Serbia
- Brza Palanka, Bor, Serbia
- Smederevska Palanka, Podunavlje, Serbia
- Byala Palanka, Tvarditsa Municipality, Bulgaria
- Palanka, Pennsylvania, a place in Pennsylvania, U.S.

== Other uses ==
- Palanka (fortification), a wooden fortification used by the Ottoman Empire and the eponym of numerous aforementioned toponyms
- Palanka (administrative unit), a territorial district of the Zaporozhian Sich
- Palanka (film), a 1975 Indian Bengali-language film
- Palanka, a character in the Practical Chinese Reader, used for teaching Mandarin Chinese
- Kriva Palanka dialect, one of the northern dialects of Macedonian

== See also ==
- Palanca (disambiguation)
- Palanko, a village in Togo
- Pálinka, a fruit spirit
