= Kore =

Kore may refer to:

== Arts and entertainment ==
- Kore (comics), a comic-book series by Josh Blaylock and Tim Seeley
- Kore (producer), French-Algerian music producer, also part of duo Kore & Skalp
- Kore (sculpture), a type of ancient Greek sculpture depicting a young female

== Business ==
- KORE, an AM radio station in Springfield, Oregon, US
- KORE Wireless, company, Alpharetta, Georgia, US
- Kore Press, publisher, Tucson, Arizona, US
- Kore (energy drink)

== Places ==
- Kore, Togo
- Kore (moon), a natural satellite of Jupiter
- Kore (woreda), Ethiopia
- Orange Municipal Airport, Massachusetts (ICAO airport code: KORE)

== Other uses ==
- Persephone, a goddess in Greek mythology
- Kore people, a people on Lamu Island in Kenya
- Kore University of Enna, Sicily, Italy
- Korean mixed script, by ISO 15924 code
- Koda language, of India and Bangladesh
- Kore (mythology), child eating demon from Albanian mythology
- The Kore Gang, a 2011 platformer video game
- Kore, an open-source, cross-compilation shader API.

== People with the given name ==
- Kore Tola (born 1997), Ethiopian middle-distance runner
- Kore Yamazaki, Japanese manga artist

== People with the surname ==
- Prabhakar Kore (born 1947), Indian politician from Karnataka
- Vinay Kore (born 1971), Indian politician from Maharashtra
- Akshayraj Kore (born 1988), Indian chess player

== See also ==
- Core (disambiguation)
- Kores (disambiguation)
