= Bourgou =

Bourgou may refer to:

- Bourgou, Togo
- Bourgou (grass) – a grass native to Africa.

== See also ==
- Borgou Department in Benin
- Borgu (region in NW Nigeria and north Benin)
- Bougou, Burkina Faso
- Bougou, Côte d'Ivoire
- Burgu (disambiguation)
