= Kpasside =

- Location in Togo
- Coordinates: 10°1′N 0°59′E
- Country: Togo
- Region: Kara Region
- Prefecture: Kéran

Kpasside is a village in the Kara Region of northern Togo. Nearby towns and villages include Soute (4.1 nm), Wihote (3.6 nm), Pesside (3.6 nm), Baredjian (1.0 nm), Kandé (5.1 nm), Koupagou (7.2 nm) and Tantanierta (4.0 nm).
