= Dissani =

- Location in Togo
- Coordinates: 10°3′N 1°7′E
- Country: Togo
- Region: Kara Region
- Prefecture: Kéran

Dissani is a village in the Kara Region of northern Togo. Nearby towns and villages include Koupagou (1.0 nm), Kouatie (2.2 nm), Bako Samaba (4.1 nm), Koudan-Mangou (4.5 nm), Kouba Tie (2.0 nm) and Animene Tie (1.4 nm).
