= Koupagou =

- Location in Togo
- Coordinates: 10°3′N 1°6′E
- Country: Togo
- Region: Kara Region
- Prefecture: Kéran

Koupagou is a village in the Kara Region of northern Togo. Nearby towns and villages include Kpasside (7.2 nm), Baredjian (7.0 nm), Koukouo Tougou (3.2 nm), Kouatie (2.0 nm), Dissani (1.0 nm), Kandé(6.4 nm) and Kouba Tie (2.2 nm).
