= Kouatie =

- Location in Togo
- Coordinates: 10°5′N 1°6′E
- Country: Togo
- Region: Kara Region
- Prefecture: Kéran

Kouatie is a village in the Kara Region of northern Togo. Nearby towns and villages include Koukouo Tougou (1.4 nm), Bako Samaba (2.8 nm), Koupagou (2.0 nm) and Dissani (2.2 nm).
