= Bimax =

Bimax may refer to:

- Airfer Bimax, a Spanish paramotor design
- Houde Bimax, a French ultralight aircraft design
