= Tantanierta =

- Location in Togo
- Coordinates: 9°57′N 0°59′E
- Country: Togo
- Region: Kara Region
- Prefecture: Kéran

Tantanierta is a village in the Kara Region of northern Togo. Nearby towns and villages include Mandou (1.0 nm), Pamou (1.0 nm), Soute (1.4 nm), Kpasside (4.0 nm) Adjaite(2.2 nm), Kandé (3.7 nm), Tapouta (1.0 nm) and Anatoa (1.4 nm).
