= Kouadangou =

- Location in Togo
- Coordinates: 10°8′N 1°7′E
- Country: Togo
- Region: Kara Region
- Prefecture: Kéran

Kouadangou is a village in the Kara Region of northern Togo. Nearby towns and villages include Nadoba (2.8 nm), Bako Touga (2.2 nm), Koumagou(1.0 nm), Koutatiegou (1.4 nm), Koukouo Tougou (2.8 nm), Bako Samaba (1.4 nm).
