= Southern Ukraine =

Southern oblasts of Ukraine

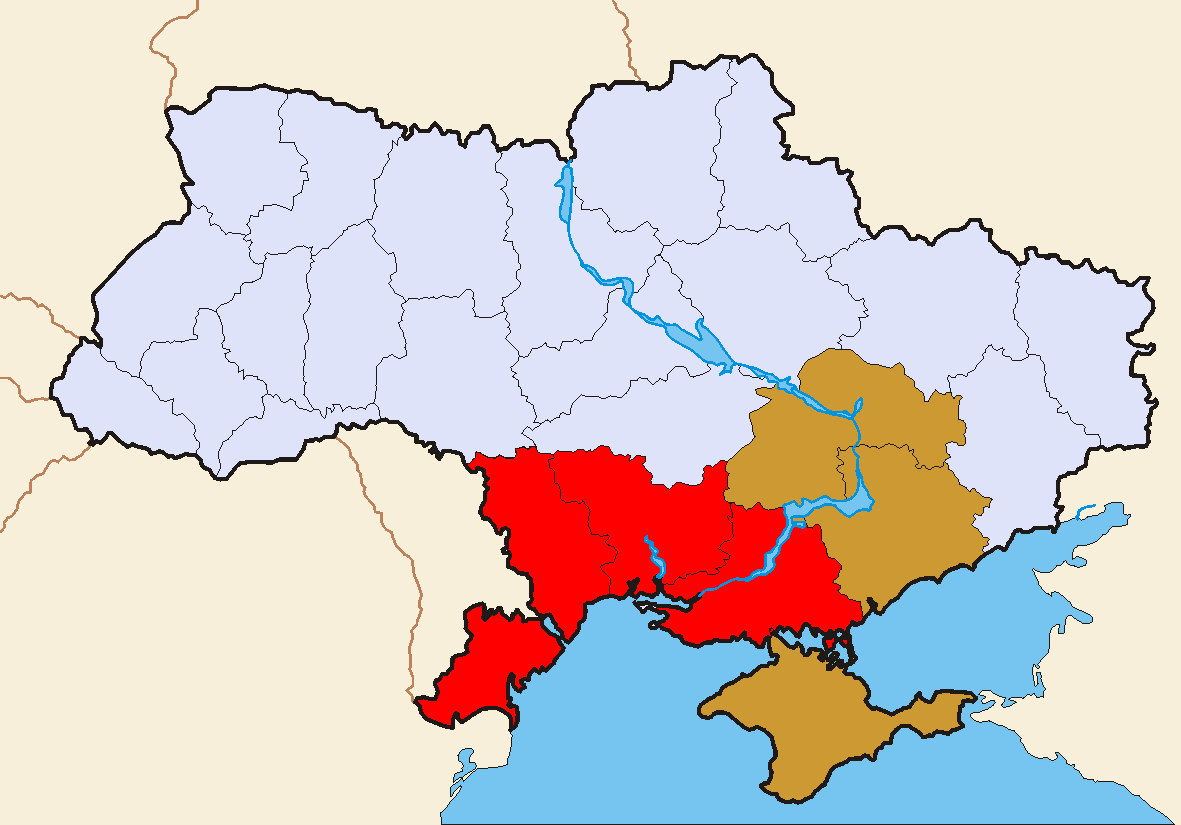
Several oblasts can be referred to as "south": Red – always included Brown – often included

Southern Ukraine (Ukrainian: Південна Україна, romanized: Pivdenna Ukrayina, IPA: [piu̯ˈdɛnːɐ ʊkrɐˈjinɐ]) refers, generally, to the territories in the South of Ukraine.

The territory usually corresponds with the Soviet economical district, the Southern Economical District of the Ukrainian Soviet Socialist Republic. The region is completely integrated with a marine and shipbuilding industry.

Southern Ukraine was invaded by the Russian military on February 24, 2022, turning parts of the region into a major theatre of the Russo-Ukrainian War.

== Historical background ==
The region primarily corresponds to the former Kherson, Taurida, and most of the Yekaterinoslav Governorates which spanned across the northern coast of Black Sea after the Russian-Ottoman Wars of 1768–74 and 1787–92.

The Kurgan hypothesis places the Pontic steppes of Ukraine and southern Russia as the linguistic homeland of the Proto-Indo-Europeans. The Yamnaya culture is identified with the late Proto-Indo-Europeans. The region has been inhabited for centuries by various nomadic tribes, such as Scythians, Sarmatians, Alans, Huns, Bulgars, Pechenegs, Kipchaks, Turco-Mongols and Tatars.

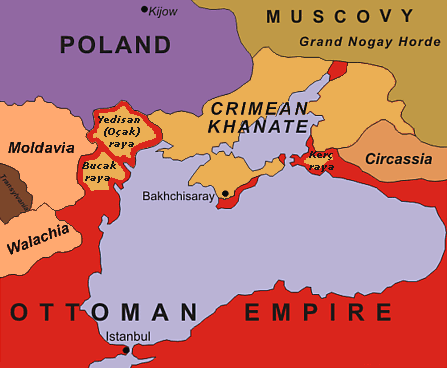
The Crimean Khanate in about 1600. Note that the areas marked Poland and Muscovy were claimed rather than administered.

Before the 18th century, the territory known as the Wild Fields (as translated from Polish or Ukrainian) was dominated by Ukrainian Cossack community better known as Zaporozhian Sich and the realm of the Crimean Khanate with its Nogai minions that was a union state of the bigger Ottoman Empire. The Crimean–Nogai slave raids caused considerable devastation and depopulation in the area before the rise of the Zaporozhian Cossacks.

Encroachment of Muscovy (today Russia) in the region started after the 16th century after its expansion along Volga river after the Moscow-Kazan wars and conquest of Astrakhan. Further expansion continued also with Moscow-Lithuania armed clashes.

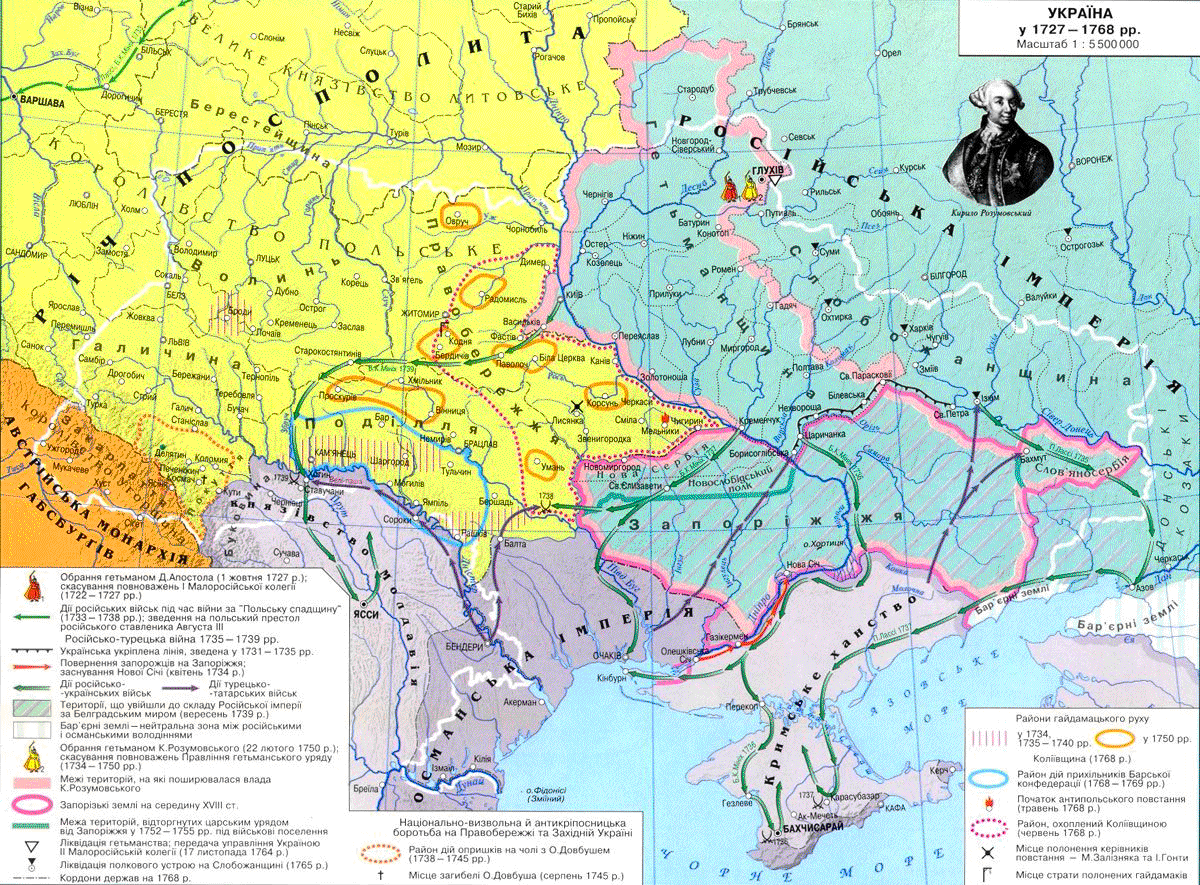
Ukraine in the 18th century

With start of the Khmelnytsky Uprising within Polish–Lithuanian Commonwealth in middle of 17th century, Muscovy on pretence of the eastern Orthodoxy protection further expanded its influence down south over Cossack communities of Pontic steppes (lower Don and lower Dnieper) and the Crimean Khan domains.

At the end of 17th century a native Kyivan, bishop Theophan Prokopovych came up with the idea of an all-Russian nation referring to the old Rus state founder of which Volodymyr the Great was baptized and accepted Byzantine Christianity (today known as Eastern Orthodoxy) in Chersoneses of Taurida (today in Sevastopol).

In 1686 there was signed the Treaty of Perpetual Peace between Muscovy and Polish–Lithuanian Commonwealth, after which Muscovy took control over the Left-bank Ukraine, Zaporozhian Sich, and Kyiv with outskirts.

In the 18th century, Ukrainian line was built and the lands of the earlier destroyed Zaporozhian Sich were resettled by Serbs creating the territories of New Serbia and Slovianoserbia.

At the end of 18th century following the annexation of Crimea by the Russian Empire and the treaty of Jassy (the Ochakiv Region, area of today's Odesa and Mykolaiv oblasts), the Russian Empire assumed full control of the northern Black Sea coast.

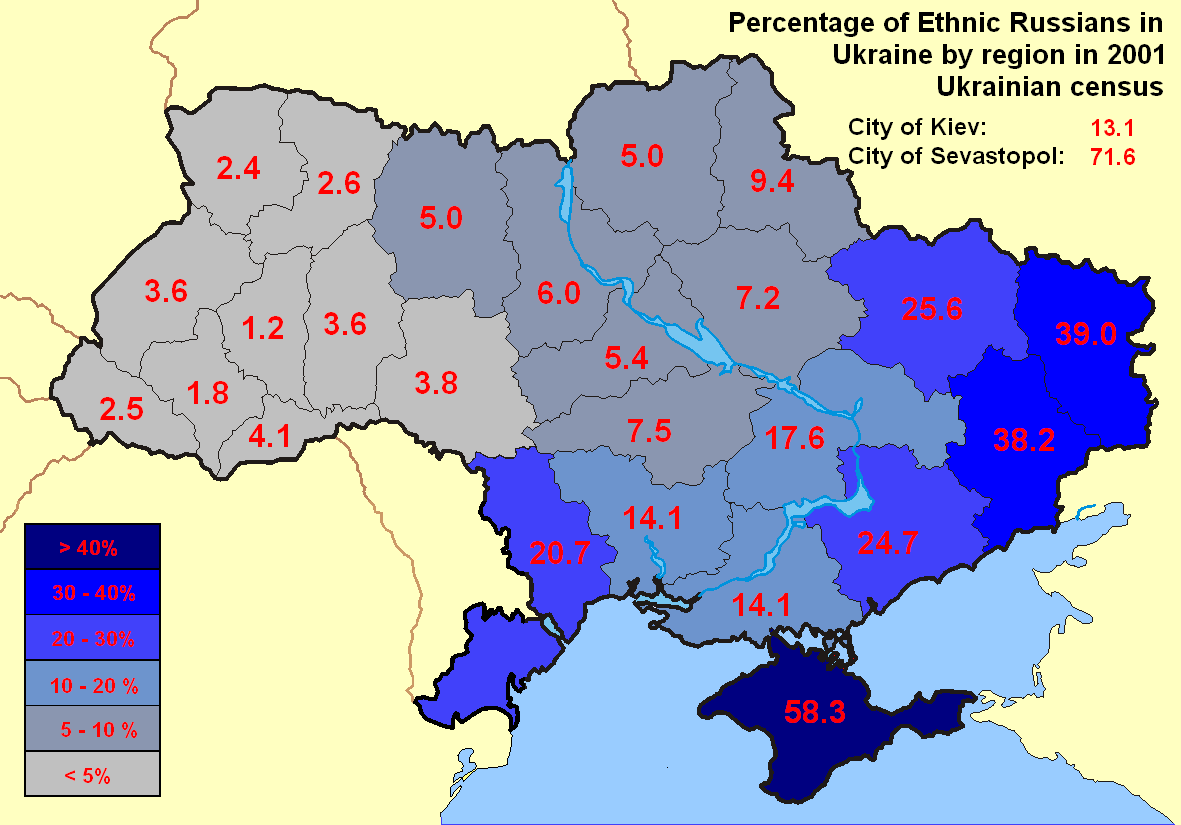
Ethnic Russians by region (Census 2001)

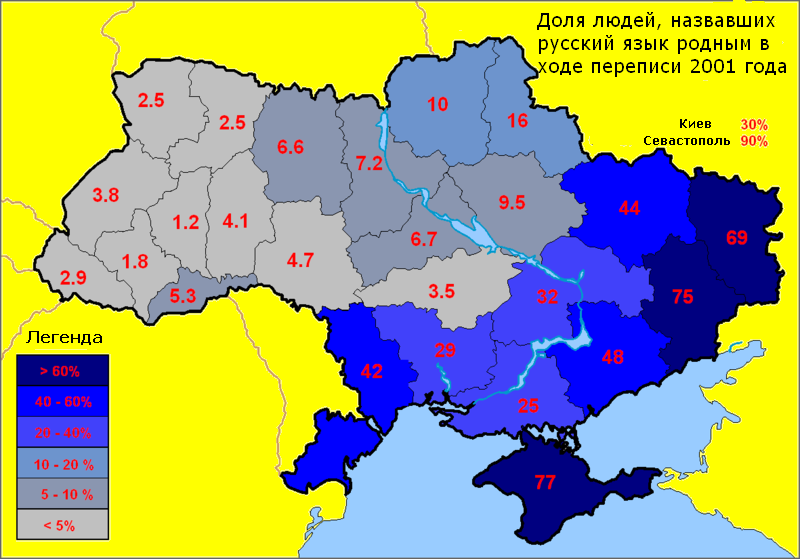
Inhabitants with Russian as mother tongue by region (Census 2001)

=== Russian Hellenization of Pontic littoral ===
After the Russian-Ottoman Wars of the second half of 18th century (1768–74 and 1787–92) and acquisition of all territory of modern southern Ukraine, number of settlements and cities with Turkic or other names in region were renamed in Greek or Russian manner.

- Acidere → Ovidiopol
- Hacıbey → Odesa
- Orel Sloboda (Catherinine sconce) → Olviopol (today Pervomaisk, Mykolaiv Oblast)
- Domakha → Mariupol (by Balaklava Greeks from outskirts of Bakhchysarai)
- Bilehowisce (Alexander sconce) → Kherson
- Aqyar → Sebastopol (today Sevastopol)
- Kezlev → Yevpatoria
- Kiz-yar → Novo-alexandrovka (Novo-olexandrivka) Sloboda → Melitopol
- Caffa (Kefe) → Theodosia (today Feodosia)
- Aqmescit → Simferopol
- Mykytyn Rih → Slaviansk → Nikopol
- Usivka (Bečej sconce) → Alexandria (today Oleksandriia)
- Sucleia (Sredinnaya fortress) → Tiraspol (in Moldova)
- Czorna → Grigoriopol (in Moldova)

Following the World War II any trace of Crimean Tatar toponymy was predominantly removed in Crimea and Kherson Oblast.

== Politics ==
Russian is spoken by a significant minority in the region, although not to the extent that it is in the three oblasts that comprise eastern Ukraine. Effective in August 2012, a new law on regional languages entitles any local language spoken by at least a 10% minority be declared official within that area. Within weeks Russian was declared as a regional language in several southern and eastern oblasts and cities. Russian could then be used in these cities/oblasts' administrative office work and documents. On 23 February 2014, the Ukrainian parliament voted to repeal the law on regional languages, which would have made Ukrainian the sole state language at all levels even in southern and eastern Ukraine. This vote was vetoed by acting President Turchynov on March 2. Nevertheless the law was repealed by the Constitutional Court of Ukraine on 28 February 2018 when it ruled the law unconstitutional.

Noticeable cultural differences in the region (compared with the rest of Ukraine, except eastern Ukraine) are more "positive views" of the Russian language and of Joseph Stalin and more "negative views" of Ukrainian nationalism. In the 1991 Ukrainian independence referendum, a lower percentage of the total electorate voted for independence in eastern and southern Ukraine than in the rest of the country.

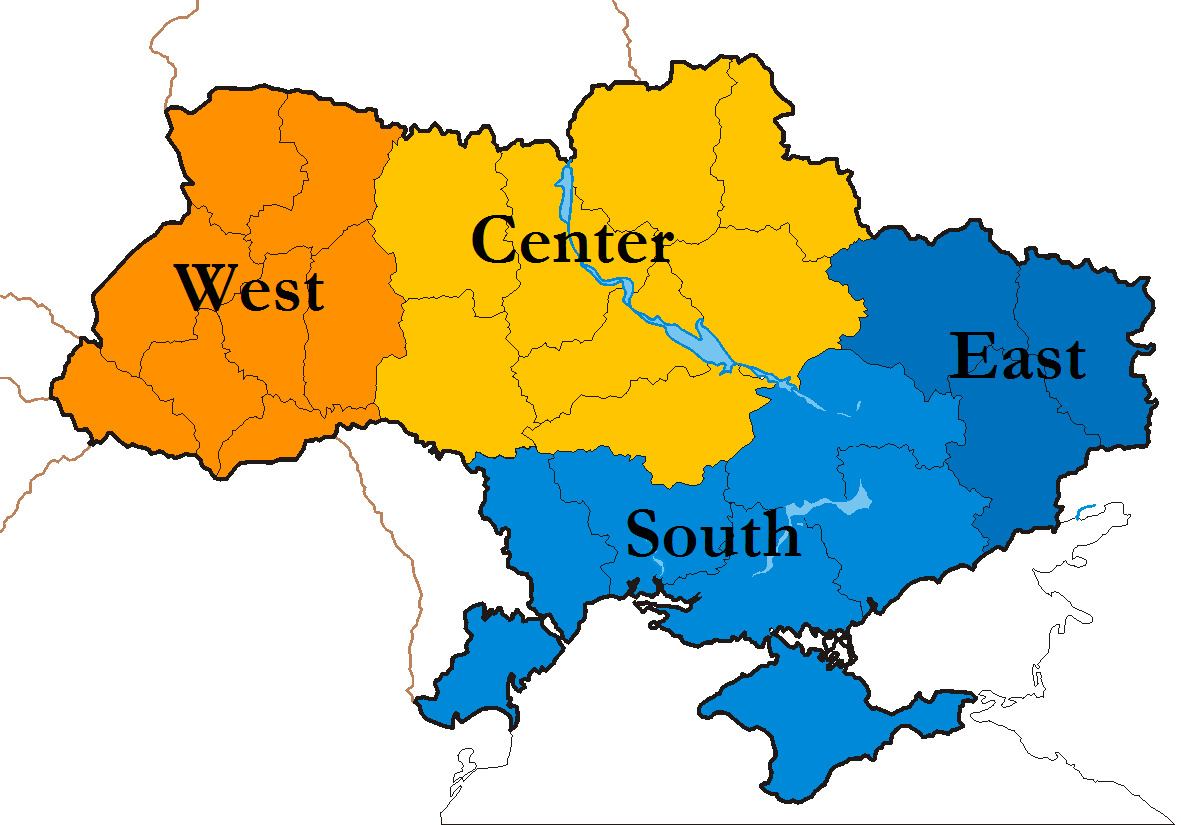
Kyiv International Institute of Sociology (KIIS) geographic division of Ukraine used in their polls.

In a poll conducted by Kyiv International Institute of Sociology in the first half of February 2014, 19.4% of those polled in southern Ukraine believed "Ukraine and Russia must unite into a single state"; nationwide this percentage was 12.5.

During elections voters of the southern (and eastern) oblasts (provinces) of Ukraine vote for the parties (Communist Party of Ukraine, Party of Regions) and the presidential candidates (Viktor Yanukovych) with a pro-Russian and status quo platform. The electorate of the CPU and the Party of Regions was very loyal to them. But following the Revolution of Dignity the Party of Regions collapsed and the Communist Party was banned and declared illegal.

== Demographics ==
=== Ethnic groups and languages ===
According to the Ukrainian national census in 2001, ethnic Ukrainians account for the overwhelming majority of the population in Southern Ukraine, with the only exceptions being central and southern Crimea, as well as the southwestern part of the Budjak in the Odesa region. In terms of spoken languages, Ukrainian is the most common language, although the Russian language dominates in many major cities like Odesa, Dnipro, Zaporizhzhia, Mykolaiv, Melitopol or Berdiansk. In Crimea, Russian is most common language, while only rural areas in the north of the peninsula have a Ukrainophone majority. Due to Crimea's ethnic diversity, Russian is also the most common language among the majority of all inhabitants without an ethnic Russian background in the region and serves as the interethnic language in the autonomous republic.

AR Crimea
	percent
Russians	58.5%
Ukrainians	25.4%
Crimean Tatars	12.1%
Belarusians	1.5%
Tatars	0.5%
Armenians	0.4%
Jews	0.2%
Poles	0.2%

Dnipropetrovsk Oblast
	percent
Ukrainians	79.3%
Russians	17.6%
Belarusians	0.7%
Jews	0.4%
Armenians	0.3%
Azerbaijanis	0.2%

Kherson Oblast
	percent
Ukrainians	82.0%
Russians	14.1%
Belarusians	0.8%
Tatars	0.5%
Armenians	0.2%
Moldovans	0.2%

Mykolaiv Oblast
	percent
Ukrainians	81.9%
Russians	14.1%
Moldovans	1.0%
Belarusians	0.7%
Bulgarians	0.4%
Armenians	0.2%
Jews	0.2%

Odesa Oblast
	percent
Ukrainians	62.8%
Russians	20.7%
Bulgarians	6.1%
Moldovans	5.0%
Gagauz	1.1%
Belarusians	0.5%
Jews	0.5%
Armenians	0.3%

Sevastopol
	percent
Russians	71.6%
Ukrainians	22.4%
Belarusians	1.6%
Tatars	0.7%
Crimean Tatars	0.5%
Armenians	0.3%
Jews	0.3%

Zaporizhzhia Oblast
	percent
Ukrainians	70.7%
Russians	24.7%
Bulgarians	1.4%
Belarusians	0.7%
Armenians	0.3%
Tatars	0.3%

Source: National composition of the population. 2001 Ukrainian Population Census. State Statistics Committee of Ukraine'

=== Religion ===
Religion in south Ukraine (2016)
1. Eastern Orthodoxy (71.0%)
2. Not religious (21.7%)
3. Simply Christianity (5.10%)
4. Protestantism (0.50%)
5. Greek Catholicism (0.50%)
6. Roman Catholicism (0.50%)
7. Judaism (0.50%)
8. Others (0.50%)

According to a 2016 survey of religion in Ukraine conducted by the Razumkov Center, around 65.7% of the population of southern Ukraine declared to be believers in any religion, while 7.4% declared to be non-believers, and 3.2% declared to be atheists and agnostics. the study also found that 77.6% of the total southern Ukraine population declared to be Christians (71.0% Eastern Orthodox, 5.1% simply Christians, 0.5% Latin Church Catholics, 0.53% members of various Protestant churches, 0.5% members of the Ukrainian Greek Catholic Church), and 0.5% were Jewish. Not religious and other believers not identifying with any of the listed major religious institutions constituted about 24.7% of the population.

== Oblasts ==
Oblast	Area in km^{2}	Population (Census 2001)	Population (1 Jan. 2012)
Odesa Oblast	33,313	2,469,057	2,388,297
Mykolaiv Oblast	24,585	1,264,743	1,178,223
Kherson Oblast	28,461	1,175,122	1,083,367
Dnipropetrovsk Oblast	31,923	3,561,224	3,320,299
Zaporizhzhia Oblast	27,183	1,929,171	1,791,668
Total excluding Crimea and Sevastopol	145,465	10,399,317	9,761,854
Crimea	26,080	2,033,736	1,963,008
Sevastopol (city)	864	379,492	381,234
Total including Crimea and Sevastopol	172,409	12,812,545	12,106,096

The neighbouring Kirovohrad Oblast is more often associated with the Central Ukraine. Also Crimea (with Sevastopol City) is reviewed sometimes as a unique region. According to the Encyclopedia of Ukraine, south Ukraine was considered to consist of the territory of the former Kherson, Taurida and Yekaterinoslav Governorates.

== Tourism ==
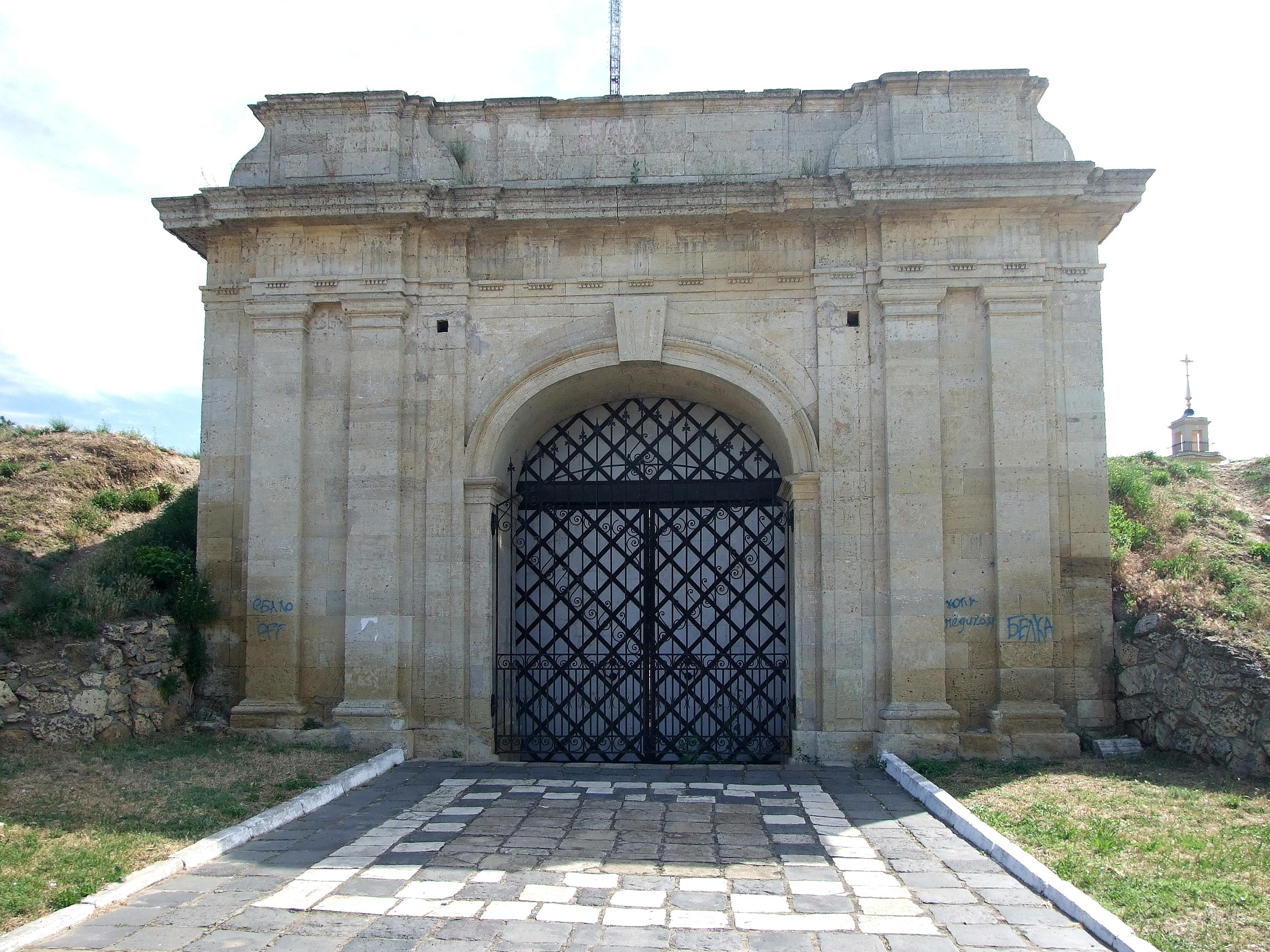
Ochakiv gate of Kherson fortress

- Kherson fortress - the first and main open air museum of the city of Kherson, the first large city in the Southern Ukraine, an important industrial and cultural center
- Museum of Shipbuilding and the Fleet - the biggest museum of Mykolaiv
- Bilhorod-Dnistrovskyi fortress - fortress in Odessa Oblast nrsr the coast of Black Sea.
- Kodak fortress - remains of the Ukrainian Cossack fortress in the city of Dnipro
- Reconstruction of the Zaporizhian Sich - open-air museum in the center of the city of Zaporizhzhia

== See also ==
- Central Ukraine
- Dnieper Ukraine
- Eastern Ukraine
- Western Ukraine
- Wild Fields
