= Lao River =

Lao River may refer to:

- Lao (Italian river), a river in Italy
- Lao River (Thailand), a tributary of the Kok River in Thailand

== See also ==
- Lao (disambiguation)
