= Lao =

Lao may refer to:

== Laos ==
- Something of, from, or related to Laos, a country in Southeast Asia
- Lao people (people from Laos, or of Lao descent)
- The Lao language
- Lao Rongzhi (born 1974), Chinese female serial killer
- Lao script, the writing system used to write the Lao language
  - Lao (Unicode block), a block of Lao characters in Unicode
- LAO, the international vehicle registration code for Laos

== Other places ==
- Mount Lao (崂山), Qingdao, China
- Lao River, Italy, a river of southern Italy
- Lao River, Thailand, a tributary of the Kok River in Thailand
- Lao, Bhutan, a settlement in Trashiyangtse District, eastern Bhutan
- Lao, Estonia, village in Tõstamaa Parish, Pärnu County
- Lao, Togo
- LAO, IATA code of Laoag International Airport in the Philippines

== Philosophers ==
- Laozi or Lao-Tzu, philosopher and poet of ancient China.

== Other ==
- Alternative spelling of Liu, common Chinese surname
- California Legislative Analyst's Office
- Lands Administration Office
- Legal Aid Ontario
- Legislative Affairs Office
- Linear alpha olefin
- The material lanthanum aluminate, or LaAlO_{3}
- Local Audit Office

== See also ==
- Loa (disambiguation)
