= Sode =

Sode may refer to:

- Sode, Haute-Garonne, a commune in the Haute-Garonne department in France
- Sode, Togo
- The pauldron-analogue in Japanese armor.
