= Bako Samaba =

- Location in Togo
- Coordinates: 10°7′N 1°8′E
- Country: Togo
- Region: Kara Region
- Prefecture: Kéran

Bako Samaba is a village in the Kara Region of northern Togo. Nearby towns and villages include Koukouo Tougou (3.1 nm), Kouadangou (1.4 nm), Koutatiegou (2.0 nm), Koutagou (2.2 nm), Koudan-Mangou (1.0 nm), Kouatie (2.8 nm) and Dissani (4.1 nm.
