= Palanca =

Palanca may refer to:

== People ==
- Bernard Palanca (born 1976), Filipino actor
- Massimo Palanca (born 1953), Italian footballer
- Mico Palanca (1978–2019), Filipino actor
- Miguel Palanca (born 1987), Spanish footballer

== Places ==
- Palanca, Huíla, Angola
- Palanca, Luanda, Quilamba Quiaxi municipality, Angola
- Palanca, Drochia, Moldova
- Palanca, Ștefan Vodă, Moldova
- Palanca, Hîrjauca, Moldova
- Palanca, Bacău, Romania
- Palanca, Florești-Stoenești, Romania
- Palanca, Râfov, Romania
- Palanca River, a tributary of Râmnicel, Romania

== Other uses ==
- Palanca Awards, literary awards of the Philippines
- Palanca TV, an Angolan TV station

== See also ==
- Palanka (disambiguation)
