= Azeb =

Irregular soldiers, made up of unmarried youths

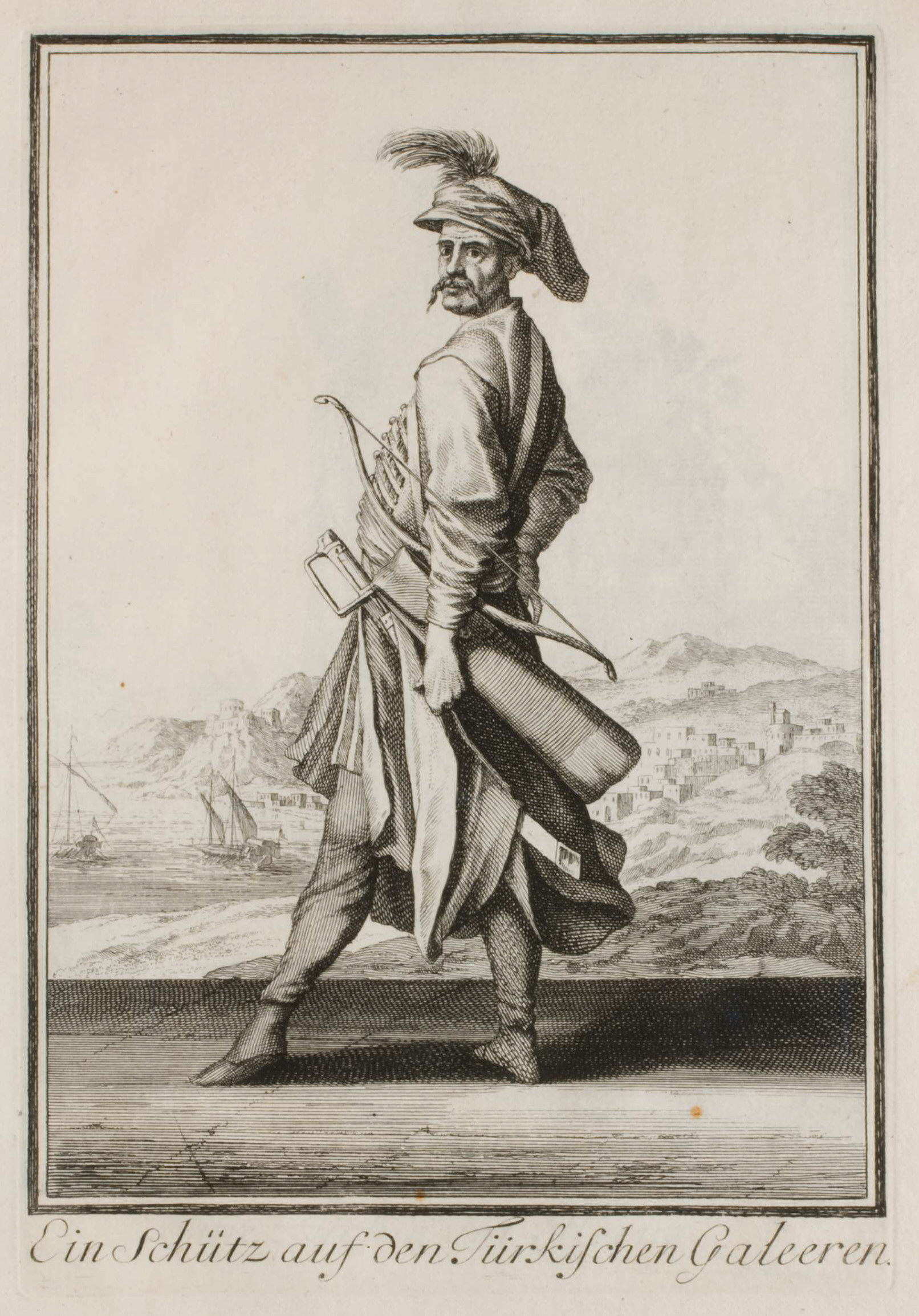
An archer of the Turkish Galleys - Azab

Azebs, azabs, or azaps (Ottoman Turkish: عزب, from Arabic, literally unmarried, meaning bachelor), also known as Asappes or Asappi, were irregular soldiers, originally made up of unmarried youths. They were conscripted among reayas and served in various roles in the early Ottoman army. The word azeb either often indicates a light infantry soldier which was called yaya azeb or a marine soldier which was called bahriye (navy) and deniz (sea) azeb. The term was used in the sense of "pirate" or "buccaneer" in Byzantine, Latin, and Italian sources from the 14th to 16th centuries.

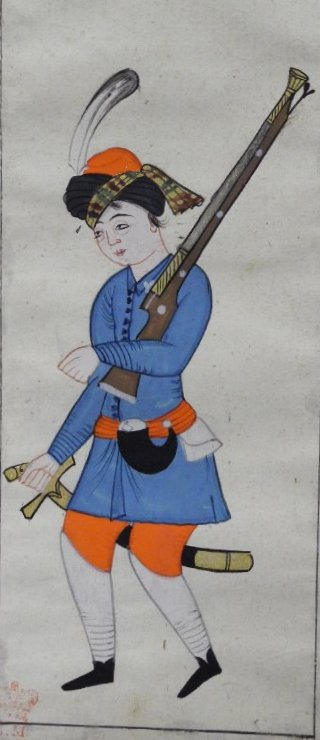
An azeb holding a gun with his left hand and carrying a sabre in his right hand

== History ==
Azebs were originally an auxiliary infantry unit harkening back to Anatolian beyliks that became independent from the Anatolian Seljuk Sultanate. In the maritime beyliks, they also served as naval units. For instance, in the 13th century, sources attest to the existence of troops called azebs in the Beylik of Aydın.

According to Stein (2007), by the 14th (Note: Other sources state that kale azebs emerged in the 15th or 16th century.) century azebs garrisoned in strongholds were called kale (fortress) azebs. Azebs in fortresses had duties such as building bridges, working as sappers and doing the job of armorers, especially after conscription of devshirme armorers stopped. They usually comprised most of the garrison in smaller forts and palankas.

In the Ottoman Empire the main role of azebs was fighting as infantry archers on the front lines before the cannons and janissaries. After azebs slowed down the initial enemy charge, they would withdraw to left and right, and let the Ottoman cannons and janissaries fire at the enemy.

== Recruitment ==
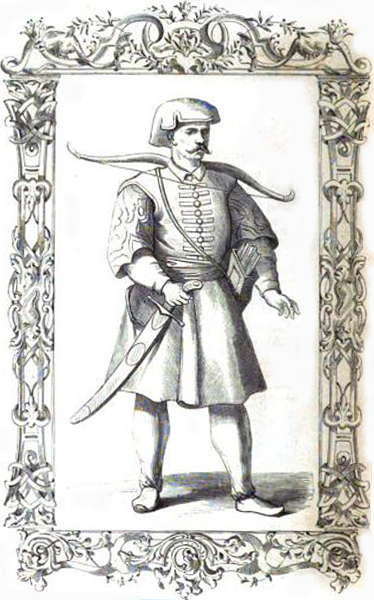
An azeb carrying a saber, which is attached to his belt, and a bow around his neck along with a quiver under his left arm.

Azebs were recruited in accordance with the kanunnames (law code) of the Suleiman I. Kadıs oversaw draft of the azebs at a local level, called sancak. One man was levied from every 20-30 households whilst others supported him financially. The azebs were initially only recruited from Anatolian Turks, and, then Rumelia. Azebs garrisoned in forts were regularly paid. In the late 16th century all Muslim men could enlist.

== Organization ==
Their official name—as generally appeared in pay lists—was rüesa ve azeban. The word reis (in plural rüesa) referred to head or captain of a ship in maritime or chief of a medium-sized unit consisting of kale azebs. Kale azebs were divided into ağalıks which were commanded by ağas and their aides kethüdas. These were subdivided into cemaats or riayets (a company consisting of 3 or 4 squads) which were led by reises.

== Equipment ==
As volunteers the azebs had a wide range of weaponry. These include pole arms, such as the tirpan (war scythe) and harba as well as balta (bardiche). In addition to pole arms they were armed with a variety of maces, bows, sabers, and to a rarer extent crossbows. Later on guns were adopted instead. Azebs also wore red börks, a felt hat like the ones worn by janissaries but in different colours.

== See also ==
- Akinji, irregular military scouts of Ottoman Empire
- Janissary, elite infantry units that formed the Ottoman sultan's household troops
- Seymen, a rank in the Seljuk military

== Bibliography ==
- Nicolle, David (1983). Armies of the Ottoman Turks 1300-1774. Osprey Publishing.
- Hegyi, Klára (2018). The Ottoman Military Organization in Hungary: Fortresses, Fortress Garrisons and Finances. ISBN 978-3-87997-467-2.
