= Agbande =

- Location in Togo
- Coordinates: 9°45′N 1°6′E
- Country: Togo
- Region: Kara Region
- Prefecture: Doufelgou
- Time zone: UTC + 0

Agbande is a village in the Doufelgou Prefecture in the Kara Region of north-eastern Togo.

There is also another village in the Prefecture which have the same name. This is located at:

- Agbande 9°40′N 0°57′W
