= Kawanga =

- Location in Togo
- Coordinates: 9°44′N 1°6′E
- Country: Togo
- Region: Kara Region
- Prefecture: Doufelgou
- Time zone: UTC + 0

Kawanga is a village in the Doufelgou Prefecture in the Kara Region of north-eastern Togo.
