= Pouffa =

- Location in Togo
- Coordinates: 9°44′N 0°54′E
- Country: Togo
- Region: Kara Region
- Prefecture: Doufelgou
- Time zone: UTC + 0

Pouffa is a village in the Doufelgou Prefecture in the Kara Region of north-eastern Togo.
