= Aloum =

- Location in Togo
- Coordinates: 9°44′20″N 0°59′20″E
- Country: Togo
- Region: Kara Region
- Prefecture: Doufelgou
- Time zone: UTC + 0

Aloum is a village in the Doufelgou Prefecture in the Kara Region of north-eastern Togo.
