= Burgu =

Burgu may refer to:

- Burğu, Azerbaijan
- Bùrgu, the local name of Borgo Val di Taro, Emilia, Italy
- Burgu, the name of the Wadai Empire in the Fur language
- Bourgou (grass) (Echinochloa stagnina)
- the tuning peg of a Turkish bağlama

== See also ==
- Burgui
- Burgus
