= Tchitchide =

- Location in Togo
- Coordinates: 9°54′N 1°8′E
- Country: Togo
- Region: Kara Region
- Prefecture: Doufelgou
- Time zone: UTC + 0

Tchitchide is a village in the Doufelgou Prefecture in the Kara Region of north-eastern Togo. The village has an elevation of 356 m and is 23 km near with Niamtuu.

== See also ==
- List of cities in Togo
