= Sihebi =

- Location in Togo
- Coordinates: 9°58′N 1°21′E
- Country: Togo
- Region: Kara Region
- Prefecture: Doufelgou
- Time zone: UTC + 0

Sihebi is a village in the Doufelgou Prefecture in the Kara Region of north-eastern Togo.
