= Defale =

- Location in Togo
- Coordinates: 9°52′34″N 1°5′11″E
- Country: Togo
- Region: Kara Region
- Prefecture: Doufelgou
- Time zone: UTC + 0

Defale is a village in the Doufelgou Prefecture in the Kara Region of north-eastern Togo.

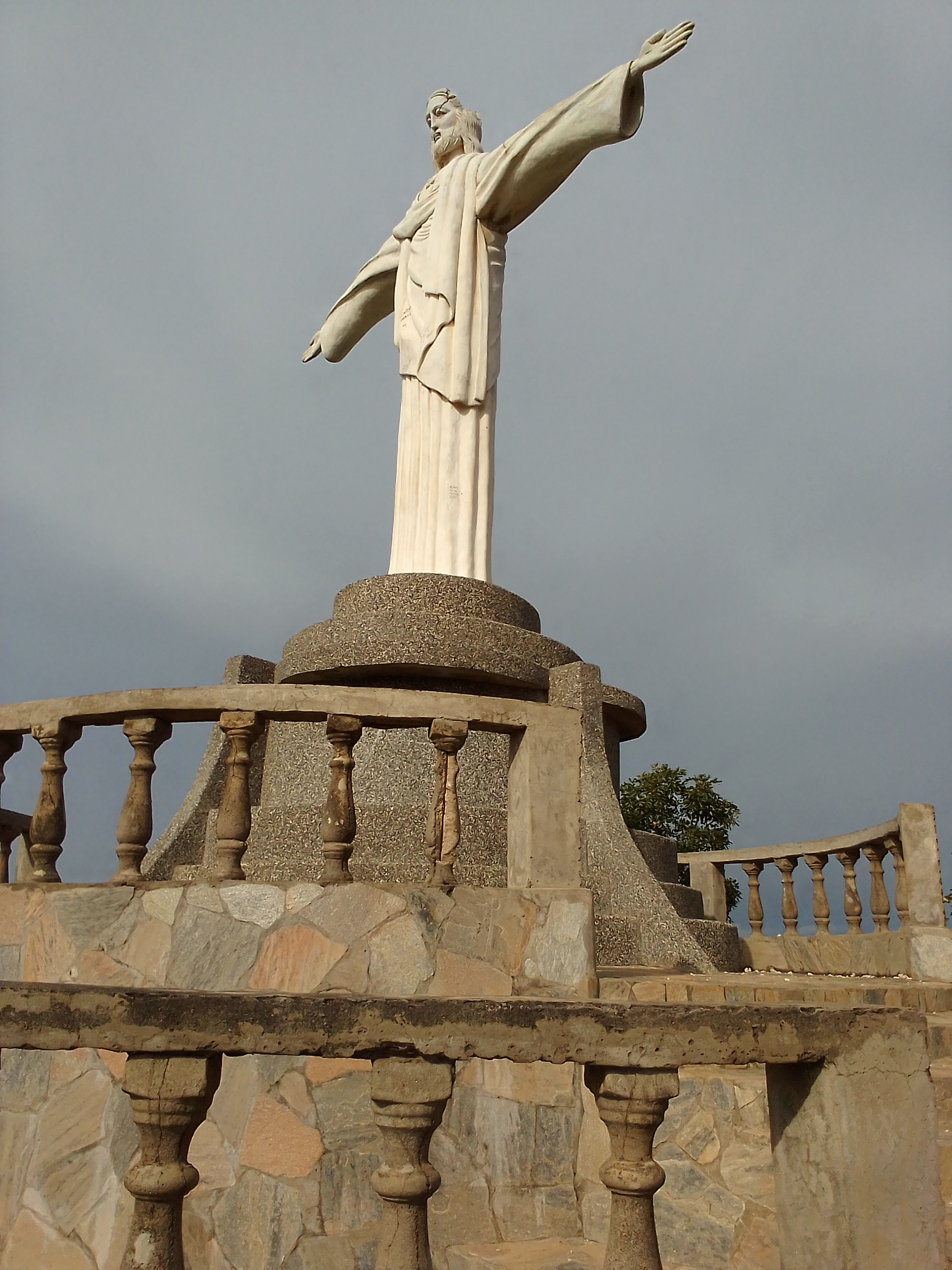
Monument of Jesus at Dafale
