= Misseouta =

- Location in Togo
- Coordinates: 9°42′N 0°55′E
- Country: Togo
- Region: Kara Region
- Prefecture: Doufelgou
- Time zone: UTC+0

Misseouta is a village in the Doufelgou Prefecture in the Kara Region of north-eastern Togo. The population of the land Misseouta are living from agriculture and breeding. We have different people like Ahoussa, Tem from different villages of Togo that live in this village.
