= Kores =

Kores may refer to:

- Kores (company)
- Art Kores (1886–1974), American professional baseball player
- Goris, Syunik, Armenia, also known as Kores

== See also ==
- Kore (disambiguation)
