= Koutougou =

- Location in Togo
- Coordinates: 10°3′16″N 1°12′38″E
- Country: Togo
- Region: Kara Region
- Prefecture: Doufelgou
- Time zone: UTC + 0

Koutougou is a village in the Keran Prefecture in the Kara Region of north-eastern Togo.
