= Andjide =

- Location in Togo
- Coordinates: 9°54′N 1°7′E
- Country: Togo
- Region: Kara Region
- Prefecture: Doufelgou
- Time zone: UTC + 0

Andjide is a village in the Doufelgou Prefecture in the Kara Region of north-eastern Togo.

== Geography ==
located in the northeastern part of Togo, within Doufelgou Prefecture, which is part of the Kara Region.

It is one of the rural villages in the area, characterized by low hills and a Sudano‑Guinean tropical climate with a dry season from November to March and a rainy season for the rest of the year. These environmental conditions make agriculture the primary economic activity for the local population, including crops such as sorghum, millet, yams, cassava, maize, peanuts, beans, and fonio.
