= Pilia (surname) =

Pilia (Abkhaz: Ҧлиа, Russian: Пилия) is an Abkhaz surname that may refer to

- Diana Pilia (born 1967), Abkhazian lawyer and politician
- Marina Pilia, Abkhazian lawyer and politician
- Nodar Pilia, Minister of Culture of Abkhazia
