= Koularo =

- Location in Togo
- Coordinates: 9°48′N 0°57′E
- Country: Togo
- Region: Kara Region
- Prefecture: Doufelgou
- Time zone: UTC + 0

Koularo is a village in the Doufelgou Prefecture in the Kara Region of north-eastern Togo.
