= Siou, Togo =

Siou
- Location in Togo
- Coordinates: 9°49′19″N 1°11′12″E
- Country: Togo
- Region: Kara Region
- Prefecture: Doufelgou
- Time zone: UTC + 0

Siou is a village in the Doufelgou Prefecture in the Kara Region of north-eastern Togo.
