= Pilia malenadu =

Scientific classification
- Kingdom: Animalia
- Phylum: Arthropoda
- Subphylum: Chelicerata
- Class: Arachnida
- Order: Araneae
- Infraorder: Araneomorphae
- Family: Salticidae
- Genus: Pilia
- Species: P. malenadu

Binomial name
- Pilia malenadu Caleb, Padiyar, Abhijith & Pai, 2025

Species of Jumping spider

Pilia malenadu is a species of jumping spider in the family Salticidae. It was described in 2025 and represents a significant rediscovery of the genus Pilia after 123 years, marking the first time female specimens of this genus have been documented.

== Taxonomy and naming ==
Pilia malenadu was discovered in Chickmagaluru, Karnataka, India. The species epithet "malenadu" refers to the Malenadu region of Karnataka, which encompasses the Western Ghats mountain ranges where the spider was found.

The genus Pilia was originally established by Eugène Simon in 1902 but had remained enigmatic due to limited material. Prior to this species, the genus was known from only three others, which were all described from male specimens. P. malenadu's collection was the first time both male and female specimens in the wild since the genus was first described.

== Distribution ==
Pilia malenadu is currently known only from its type locality in Chickmagaluru district, Karnataka, India. This region is part of the Western Ghats.

== Conservation ==
As a recently described species known from a limited area, the conservation status of Pilia malenadu has not yet been assessed.
