= Palanka (administrative unit) =

Historical administrative territorial entity

Palanka (Ukrainian: паланка) is a historical administrative and military unit of the Zaporozhian Sich. Each palanka region was centered around a settlement with a wooden fortifications that was also called palanka. They were largely populated by small Cossack settlements such as zymivnyks. Northern palankas, located close to the Cossack Hetmanate, had a large population, while the ones located on the southern borders of the Sich were sparsely populated.

== History ==
In 1634, there were five customs checkpoints on the borders of the Zaporozhian Sich – Perevolochna, Bakhmut, Domakha (within modern-day Mariupol), Perevizna, and Hard (near modern-day Pivdennoukrainsk) – and the original palankas emerged around them. The system was fully established by the Nova Sich period in 1734–1775. While the exact number fluctuated from five to eleven, there were eight major palankas: Buh Hard (center in Hard), Kalmius (center in Domakha), Kodak (center in Novyi Kodak), Pereviz or Inhul (center in Perevizna or Kamianka), Oril (center in Kozyrshchyna), Prohnoi (center in Prohnoivsk), Protovcha (center in Lychkove), and Samara (center in Samar). At the end of Nova Sich, two more palankas were created – Barvinkove (center in Barvinkove) and Lychkove – although they did not exist for long. At some point, Yalanchyk Palanka also existed on the far eastern border of the Sich. Each palanka had its own badge, flag and seal, and was headed by a polkovnyk who received a pernach after being elected at the Rada, or later being appointed by the Kish. The palanka system was abolished with the liquidation of the Zaporozhian Sich in 1775.

== List ==
| Name | Name in Ukrainian | Coat of arms (seal) | Description | Major settlements | Refs |
|---|---|---|---|---|---|
| Buh Hard Palanka | Бугогардівська паланка | | Located between Southern Buh, Inhulets, and Dnipro rivers, it had developed hunting and fishing, and defended the border with the Ottoman Empire. | Hard, Myhiia, Sokoly | |
| Inhul Palanka | Інгульська паланка | | Also known as Pereviz Palanka, it was located between the Inhul and the right bank of the Dnipro. The locals were engaged in fishing, hunting, honey hunting, and customs. | Perevizna (Perevizke), Kamianka, Bila Krynytsia, Davydiv Brid | |
| Kalmius Palanka | Кальміуська паланка | | Located near the Sea of Azov along Kalmius and Vovcha rivers. Despite the imperial ukase of 1746 setting a defined boundary between the Kalmius Palanka and the Don Cossacks along the Kalmius, the two did not strictly follow this border. | Domakha, Bakhmut, Makarove, Yasynuvate | |
| Kodak Palanka | Кодацька паланка | | Located on the right bank of the Dnipro, it was one of the most populous palankas. Its territory was decreased in the 1750s following the establishment of New Serbia and Nova Sloboda Regiment by the Russian Empire. | Novyi Kodak, Karnaukhivka, Mykytyne, Tomakivka, Staryi Kodak | |
| Oril Palanka | Орільська паланка | | Located between Oril and Samara rivers beyond the Protovcha Palanka. It has a developed agriculture and was settled largely by migrants from the neighboring Cossack Hetmanate and Sloboda Ukraine. | Kozyrshchyna, Hupalivka, Priadivka | |
| Prohnoi Palanka | Прогноївська паланка | | Located on the left bank of the Dnipro–Buh estuary and defended the Sich from the Crimean Khanate and the Ottoman Empire, protecting trade (including Chumak) routes to Ochakiv and Crimea. | Prohnoivsk (Prohnoinsk) | |
| Protovcha Palanka | Протовчанська паланка | | Located between Oril and Samara rivers on the left bank of the Dnipro. Despite occupying a small area, it was one of the most densely populated palankas, and had a developed agriculture. It was created in mid-1760s from a part of Samara Palanka. Conflicts often arose between Protovcha Palanka and Russia's Novorossiya Governorate. | Lychkove, Kytaihorod, Pereshchepyne, Petrykivka | |
| Samara Palanka | Самарська паланка | | Located between Samara and Kinska rivers on the left bank of the Dnipro. This palanka had a variety of developed crafts, namely agriculture, stud farming, fishing, hunting, beekeeping, and woodworking. It was also the site of the St. Nicholas Samar Monastery, one of the most important sacral centers of the Zaporozhian Cossacks. | Samar, Bryhadyrivka, Pishchana Samar, Viiskove | |

== See also ==
- Regiment (administrative unit), a similar division used in the Cossack Hetmanate
