= Selebino =

- Location in Togo
- Coordinates: 10°0′N 1°12′E
- Country: Togo
- Region: Kara Region
- Prefecture: Doufelgou
- Time zone: UTC + 0

Selebino is a village in the Doufelgou Prefecture in the Kara Region of northeastern Togo. Its geographical coordinates are 10° 0' 0" north, 1° 12' 0" east and its native name is Sélébino.
