= Palanko =

- Location in Togo
- Coordinates: 9°48′N 0°58′E
- Country: Togo
- Region: Kara Region
- Prefecture: Doufelgou
- Time zone: UTC + 0

Palanko is a village in the Doufelgou Prefecture in the Kara Region of north-eastern Togo.
