= Houde Institute =

Think tank in China

Houde Institute 厚德国际智库
- Formation: 2019
- Type: Think tank
- Location: Beijing
- President: Wang Hongjuan

The Houde Institute (Chinese: 厚德智库; lit. 'Houde think tank') is a Think-tank based in Beijing which specializes in research related to international relations. The Institute was established in 2019 and is currently led by Wang Hongjuan. The institute conducts research and policy recommendations regarding China's international relations, China's Belt and Road Initiative, technology innovation, crisis management as well as other topics.

== Activities ==
In June 2020, Houde Institute signed an agreement with South Africa's Inclusive Society Institute for strategic cooperation on both countries' economic development and cooperation on the Belt and Road Initiative.
