= Houde (surname) =

Houde is a French surname. Notable people with the surname include:

- Camillien Houde (1889–1958), Canadian politician
- Charles-Édouard Houde (1823–1912), Canadian politician
- Claude Houde (born 1947), Canadian ice hockey player
- Éric Houde (born 1976), Canadian ice hockey player
- Frédéric Houde (1847–1884), Canadian journalist and politician
- Germain Houde (born 1952), Canadian actor
- Harrison Houde (born 1996), Canadian actor
- Jean Houde (born 1939), French sprint canoeist
- Louis Houde (1879–1945), Canadian politician
- Louis-José Houde (born 1977), Canadian comedian
- Moïse Houde (1811–1885), Canadian politician
- Pierre Houde (born 1957), Canadian sports announcer
- Pierre Houdé, Belgian cyclist
- Roger Houde (born 1938), Canadian politician
- Serge Houde (born 1953), Canadian actor
- Sylvain Houde, Canadian singer
