= Mykolaiv Regional Museum of Local History =

History museum in Mykolaiv, Ukraine

Mykolaiv Regional Museum of Local History "Staroflotski Barracks"
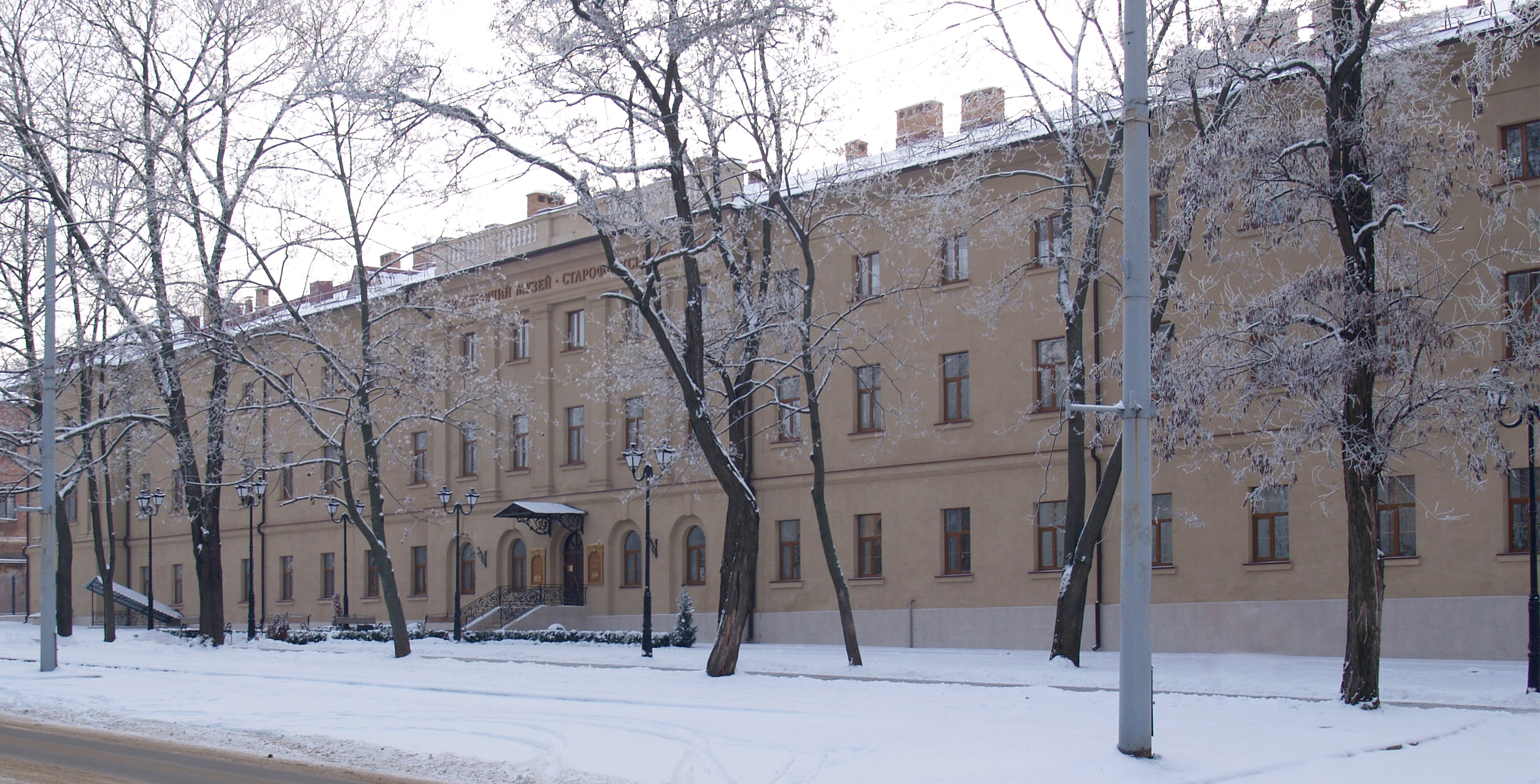
- Established: 1913
- Location: 29 Naberezhna Street, Mykolaiv, Ukraine
- Coordinates: 46.971995°N 32.006714°E

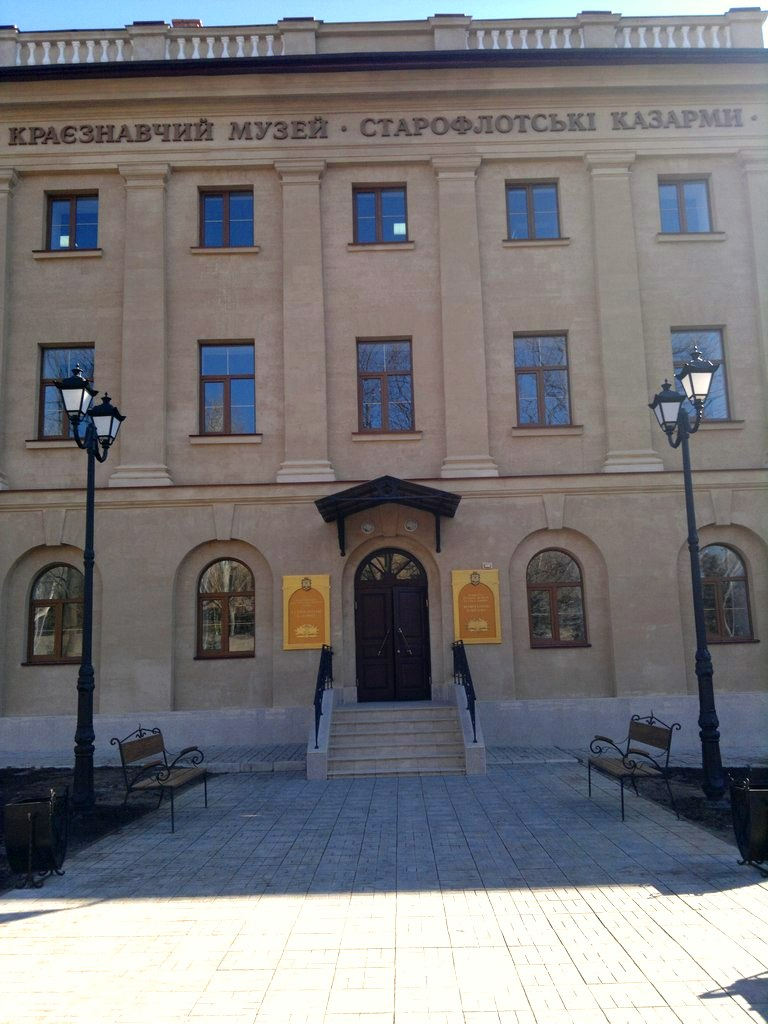
The Regional Museum of local lore of Mykolaiv

Mykolaiv Regional Museum of Local History "Staroflotski Barracks" (Ukrainian: Миколаївський краєзнавчий музей "Старофлотські Казарми") is one of the oldest museums in Ukraine. It was established on 15 (28) December 1913.

== Museum history ==
The museum's history begins in 1803 in Mykolaiv. One of the founders of the museum was Admiral de Traverse. For more than 40 years, the museum had collected valuable works of the craftsmen from the whole region. Eyewitnesses who visited museum in the early 19th century proved that museum, accept the ancient archaeological sites, has contained minerals, shells, stuffed animals, ethnographic exhibits. Also there were maps, plans of cities, buildings and ship models. The collection was traditional for that time – here the natural artifacts were located near the ancient. From the 1870 to 1900 objects from the museum were transmitted to Odessa, Kherson and Kerch, and only a small part of the exhibits remained in Mykolaiv Region.

In February 1912, the descendants of Emmanuel Frantsov who died in 1909 and who was the owner of the unique natural science collections approached the council of Mykolaiv. According to his will, this collection was presented to the city, but before that several requirements should have been fulfilled – to provide the space for collection's preservation. The Mykolaiv duma established a special commission the members of which were Duma's speakers and well-known public figures. S.I. Gaiduchenko was selected as the Head of the commission.

On Sunday, 15 December 1913, during the opening ceremony of the museum Mayor M. Leontovich, the representatives of the city's Duma and numerous guests were presented. The first director of the museum was S. I. Gaiduchenko.

After the opening, a lot of things had changed: the funds had received new items of archeology, interesting documentary sources, photographs, weapons, objects of ethnography and numismatics. The natural collection also had filled up. The city's government had given a certain amount of money for buying antiquities. The financial book for the years 1913–1916, which is stored in the archives of the museum, contained the bills and receipts with the list of purchased items. In 1916 – 1917, S. I. Gaiduchenko together with A. D. Petraschuk traveled to the Grand Duke Mykola Mykolajovych estate in the Katerynoslav province. From that place they brought a Cossack overgrave cross, "stone women", archeological items, stuffed birds and animals.

In June 1918, the 58th Prague Infantry Regiment was decided to be a part of the museum. Despite the rough events of the February Revolution and the Civil War the museum continued to develop.

In 1920, the work of the Olbian expedition was organized because of the initiative of local government. So with the help of this the archaeological museum collection was enriched in 1634 items. From that time the museum itself became known as a historical and archaeological one. the museums natural collection was reorganised into a separate museum.

After the death of S. I. Gaiduchenko, F. T. Kaminsky – archaeologist, expert on the history of the land, popularizer of the ancient monuments – became the director of the museum (May 1923).

Feodosij Kaminsky cooperated with B. V. Farmakovskyi, the famous archaeologist, director of the Olbian expedition, B. V. Farmakovskyi. From 1925, he was taking part in the expedition and was involved in the creation of archaeological preserve "Olbia". All the materials from excavations were sent to the museum's collection. F. T. Kaminsky made an important contribution into conservation of other historical monuments of the region.

Museum required a new space for the exposition, and F. T. Kaminsky started to look for the new place. In March 1929, the ceremonial opening of the new exposition of the museum took place on the Soviet Square. But six months later, the museum's director, tireless researcher F. T. Kaminsky, was accused for being a member of the Union for the Freedom of Ukraine process, and had been in Joseph Stalin's camps for 25 years. The terrible repressions didn't omit the other museum's staff. The prominent local historian and scholar M. D. Lahuta was also arrested.

The museum's exhibition in the 1930's has become very politicized. This event reduced the level of it perception.

In 1936, because of the reconstruction of Soviet Square the museum moved to a new building on the Dekabristiv Street, 32. In the early 1940s, the new departments opened in the museum: Olbia, feudalism, the history of Mykolaiv and the history of weapons, which exhibited Turkish guns of the 17th century and guns of the period of the Russian-Turkish war of the 18th century.

After the liberation of Mykolaiv, the museum's workers presented the new exposition and restored exhibits. The museum was required by the citizens who survived after a terrible war and did not lose interest to the history and nature of native land. In November 1950, the unification of historical and natural history museums into the Mykolaiv Regional Museum of Local History took place. The so-called "school room" was created for the natural collections. Here the items from the famous collection of E. P. Frantsova were displayed: minerals, corals, stuffed animals, birds, fish and even a few anomalies. The exhibition was called "school room" because it exhibits served as didactic material for the study of botany, zoology, geography, chemistry, mineralogy.

In 1960–1990, a lot of changes existed. One by one the collecting expedition in other cities of USSR were conducted. The new museums were opened at schools, in towns and villages of Mykolaiv. The workers of the museum staff provided them with methodological and practical assistance. The regional museum had become more developed because of the enlargement of its departments. In 1972, the Ochakiv Military and History Museum by Alexander Suvorov was opened.

From 1973 to 1985, Vira Cherniavska had been the Headed of the museum. During her leadership the museum has acquired a certain prestige not only in Mykolaiv Oblast, but also abroad. New departments were opened and new exposition was conducted.

== Museum today ==
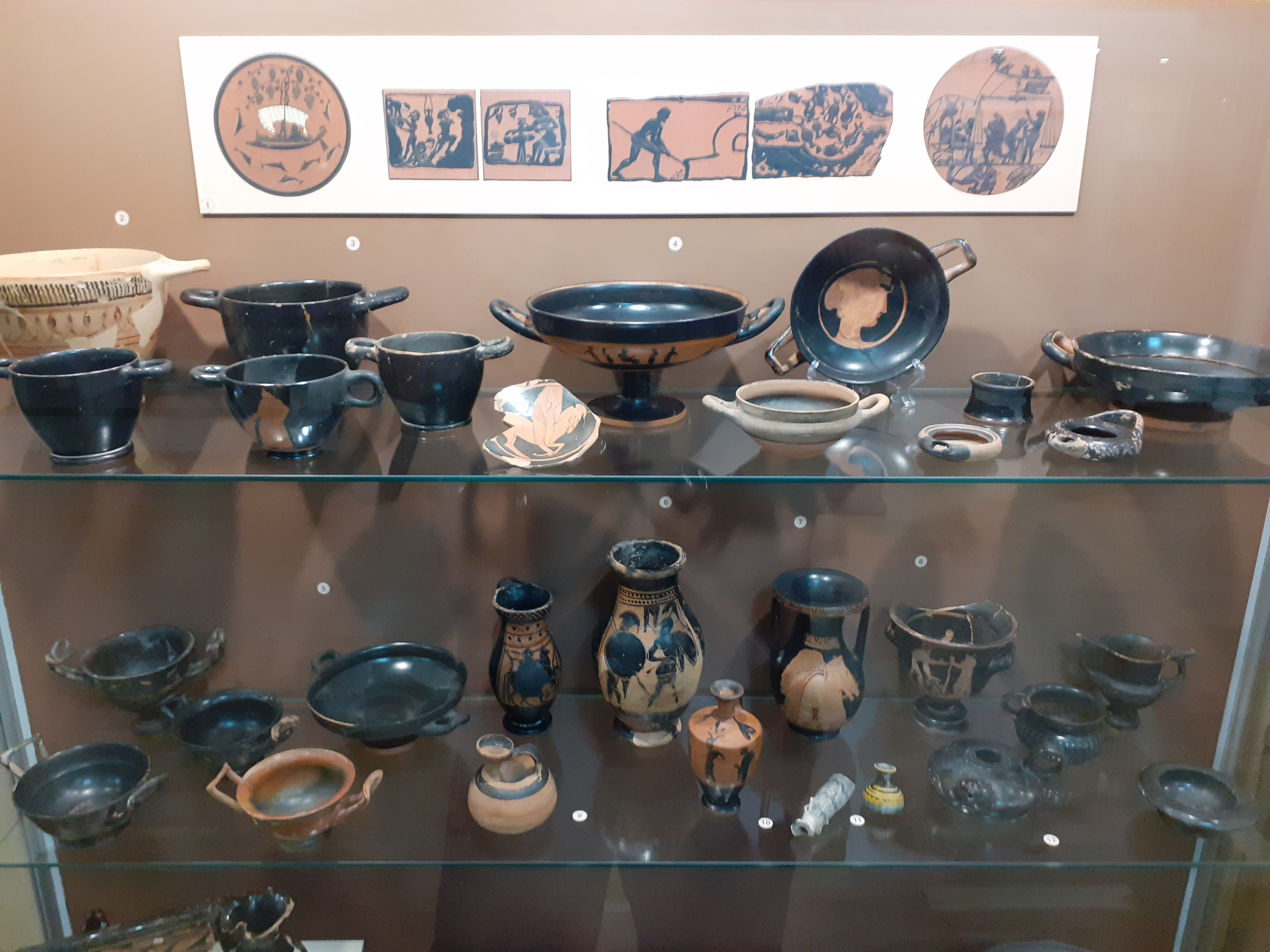
Olbia ceramics in the Mykolaiv Regional Museum of Local History

Today, Mykolaiv Regional Museum of Local History "Staroflotski Barracks" is often visited. More than 180,000 items are exhibited here. First of all, there is a unique collection of natural, archaeological objects, started from the late Paleolithic period, and the Cossack's era, a collection of ancient books, objects of worship, ethnography, numismatics, weapons, etc.

The significant contribution to the Mykolaiv museum was made by Liudmyla Hlopynska, a winner of the Shevchenko National Prize. All her creative life was dedicated to the museum. She was a researcher and a head of the Museum of Shipbuilding and a Director of the Mykolaiv Regional Museum of Local History. During her leadership the complex of Staroflotski barracks were brought to the museum. They were built by the architect K. Ackroyd in the middle of the 19th century.

Since 2012, the museum was moved to a new place. It is situated on the place where old Staroflotski barracks were founded. It is located on Admiralska Street near the Building College. The museum was opened on 22 September 2012.

In April 2025, staff from the museum began research on an Ancient Greek burial site discovered after soldiers found a small amphora while building fortifications.

== See also ==
- Mykolaiv
- The V. V. Vereshchagin Mykolaiv Art Museum

== Bibliography ==
- Kryuchkov, YS "The history of Nikolaev from the base to the present day" - Nikolaev: MP "Opportunities Cimmeria", 1996. - 299 p.
- Vadaturskyy Alex "My favorite city Nikolaev" - Nikolaev: MP "NIBULON", 2002. - 189 p.
- Scherban Y. "Old Nikolaev: toponymic dictionary - a guide" - Nikolaev. Univ Irina Gudym, 2008. - 128 p., Ill.
