= Kandé =

Kandé, Togo
- Location in Togo
- Coordinates: 9°57′N 1°03′E
- Country: Togo
- Region: Kara Region

Kandé is a town located in the Kara Region of Togo. As of 2020, the reported population of Kandé is 11,466.

Nearby towns and villages include Tantanierta (3.7 nm), Kpasside (5.1 nm), Adjaite(2.2 nm), Koupagou (6.4 nm), Atetou (2.7 nm), Nyande (3.3 nm), Titira (4.9 nm), Kouba Tie (5.5 nm) and Atetou.
