= Buruq =

- Municipality
- Location within Azerbaijan
- Coordinates: 38°54′19″N 48°25′11″E
- Country: Azerbaijan
- Rayon: Lerik

Population
  - Total: 370
- Time zone: UTC+4 (AZT)
  - Summer (DST): UTC+5 (AZT)

Buruq (also, Burğu, Burug, and Burukh) is a village and municipality in the Lerik Rayon of Azerbaijan. It has a population of 370.
