= Kore (comics) =

Cover of the first issue

Kore is a comic-book series created in 2003 by Josh Blaylock (writer) and Tim Seeley (penciller), and published by Image Comics.

There should have been Volume 2 in 2004, but was never released (Volume 2 was said to happen from the editor in the last issue, Issue #5).

In 2011, Arcane Studios released a trade paperback of the first Kore-Story from the 5 issues of Volume 1.
