= Doufelgou Prefecture =

Coordinates: 9.7667°N 1.1000°E

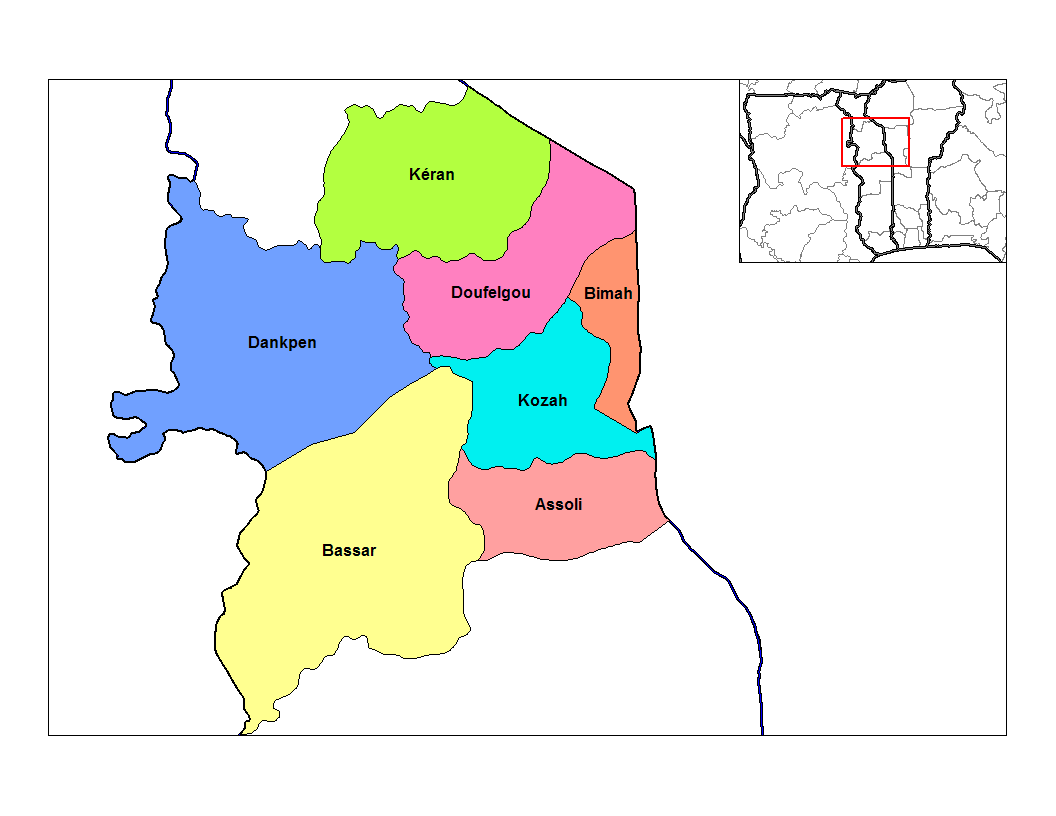
Prefectures of Kara

Doufelgou is a prefecture located in the Kara Region of Togo. The prefecture covers 1,151 km^{2}, with a population in 2022 of 84,767. The capital city is Niamtougou.

Doufelgou means White Mountain (white= felm & mountain= dour).

The cantons (or subdivisions) of Doufelgou include Niamtougou, Siou, Défalé, Alloum, Massédéna, Kadjalla, Pouda, Léon, Agbandé-Yaka, Baga, Ténéga, Kpaha, Koka, and Tchoré.

== Towns and villages ==
Agbande, Agounde, Akare, Akpante, Aliande, Aloum, Aloumere, Andjide, Aniandide, Anima, Atiaka, Baga, Bontan, Bourgou, Defale, Djorergou, Doudongue, Hago, Houde, Kadjala, Kaparama, Kapoo, Kawanga, Kore, Koubakou, Kouka, Koukou, Koukpandiada, Koularo, Kounfaga, Kounyanetme, Koussourkou, Koutougou, Kouwahaya, Kpadibe, Kpadero, Kpaha, Lao, Leon, Lokorea, Massedena, Misseouta, Niamtougou, Niatin, Ntounkwe, Oudiran, Paboute, Padebe, Palaka, Palako, Palanko, Passoute, Pilia, Pouda, Pouffa, Pouroum, Selebino, Semouhourl, Sihebi, Siou, Sioudouga, Sode, Soulao, Tagbesse, Talada, Tanakou, Tapouenta, Tapounde, Tchitchide, Tchitchide Tare, Tenega, Tidira, Togarhaouide, Walade, Wianne, Yaka, Yaoute, Yawaka
