= Lao, Bhutan =

Lao Laou
- Location in Bhutan
- Coordinates: 27°49′N 91°30′E
- Country: Bhutan
- District: Trashiyangtse District
- Time zone: UTC+6 (BTT)

Lao is a seasonal pasture in Trashiyangtse District in eastern Bhutan.
