= Palanka (fortification) =

Small fortress primarily made of palisades and earth

Palanka type forts

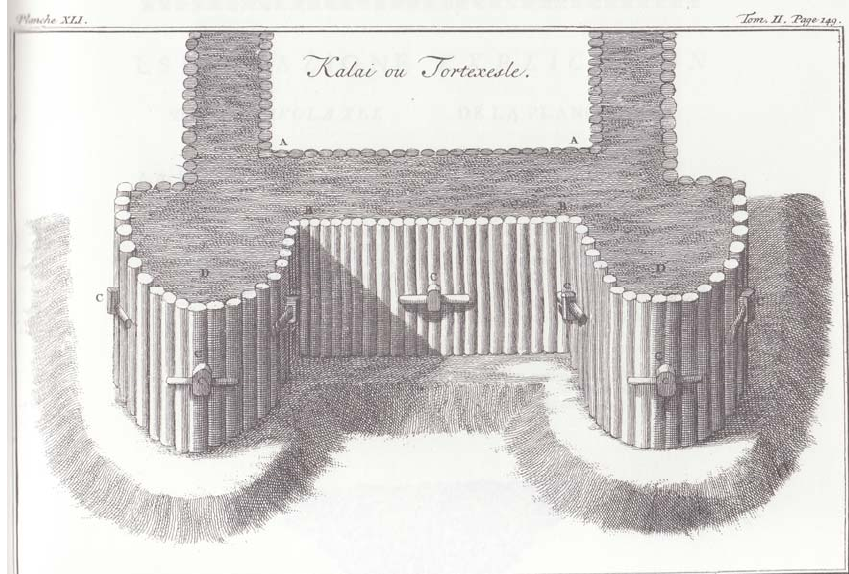
Bastions and curtain walls of a palanka fort (dolma rıhtım palanka duvar or simply dolma duvarı)

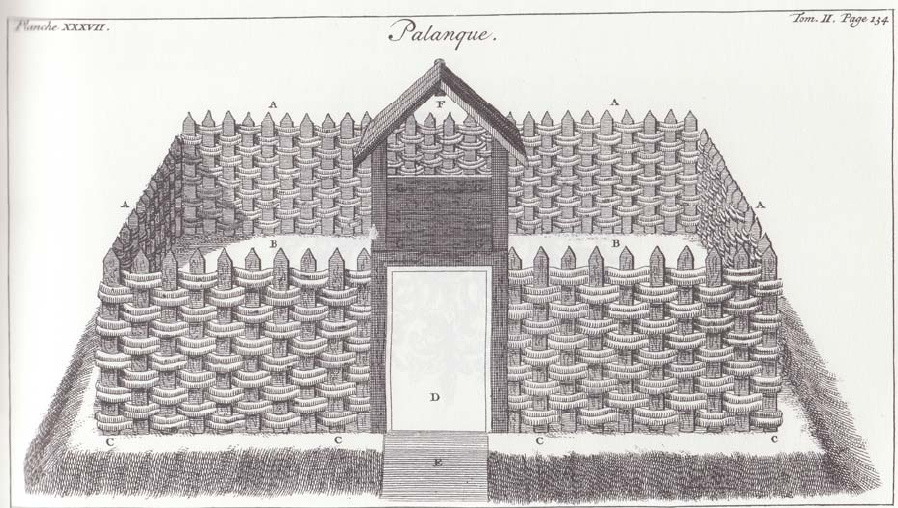
A simple palanka with its entrance guarded by a watchtower (yalın kat çit palanka)

Both pictures are drawn by Luigi Ferdinando Marsigli

A palanka (Turkish pronunciation: [paˈɫaŋka]), also known as parkan in Southern Hungary and palanga, was a wooden fortification used by the Ottoman Empire extensively in certain regions of Southeast Europe, including Hungary, the Balkans and the Black Sea coast against rival states, especially the Archduchy of Austria and the Kingdom of Hungary. Such wooden forts could be built and expanded quickly, and usually contained a small garrison. These fortifications varied in size and shape but were primarily constructed of palisades. Palankas could be adjacent to a town and later they could be replaced by a more formidable stone fortress as in the case of Uyvar. Palankas could also be built as an extension of the main fortress. Many Ottoman forts were a mixture of palanka type fortifications and stonework. Evliya Çelebi describes the word palanka also as a technique of timber masonry.

Some palankas developed into larger settlements and word palanga has been also used to describe rural settlements which originates from palankas in Erzincan, Eastern Anatolia.

== Etymology ==
The word comes from Hungarian palánkvár, which itself comes from Middle Latin palanca meaning log, which is derived from Ancient Greek phálanks or phalang (φάλανξ, φαλαγγ) also meaning log.

== Architecture ==
Typical palanka had a rectangular plan and its entrance could be guarded by a watchtower called ağaçtan lonca köşkü. Walls of a palanka could be made of a single palisade as well as two rows of stockade, creating a gap in between which is filled with earth which might be acquired from the ditch dug around the fortification, called şarampa, thus creating a protected walkway. The inner and outer palisades were held together by transverse beams, whose ends were fixed to the outer walls by wooden pins, to counter the pressure of earth filling. In order to increase resistance against cannon fire, wooden walls could be strengthened by applying mortar in a technique called horasani palanka. After that, military buildings such as bastions which cannons are placed, towers, barracks and civilian buildings such as inns, marketplaces, mosques, cisterns could be added. Lastly, a stockade could be constructed around the palanka as a secondary fortification.

== Characteristics ==
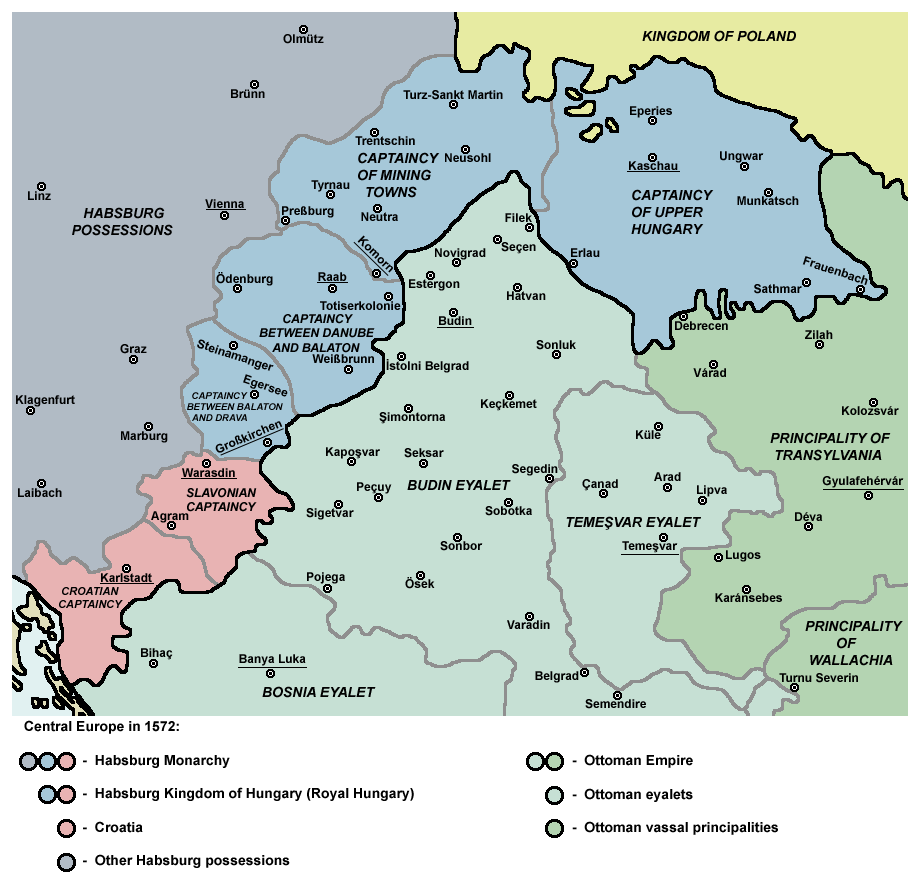
Frontiers and towns in Ottoman Hungary in 1572

Palankas were the basis of Ottoman frontier defence system in Europe and their purpose was to protect military and riverine routes, which had strategic value, and travellers, who were passing through these routes, against plunderers. These routes connected palankas, thus leading to creation of a defense network. They also allowed effective communication between strategic areas. When Ottoman reached the limit of their conquests in Europe, they used these structures to stabilize the frontier.

Although palankas were not indestructible on their own, they were interconnected structures, and if an army too strong to resist attacked, the forces of the other palankas would come to their aid. Wooden walls of palankas were difficult to ignite since they were filled with earth; and stakes used to build them were damp. Most of the troops in palankas were azaps and a palanka functioning in the frontier could have a higher ratio of cavalry troops compared to a fortress defended by cannons.

Palankas showed similarities to Roman limes system. In the pre-Ottoman period, there used to be fortifications, where palankas were constructed, and after the conquests these fortifications were rebuilt with remarkable Ottoman characteristics. Due to their makeshift aspect few palankas survive today but researches show that this kind of structures were used between 14th and late 19th century.

== Havale ==
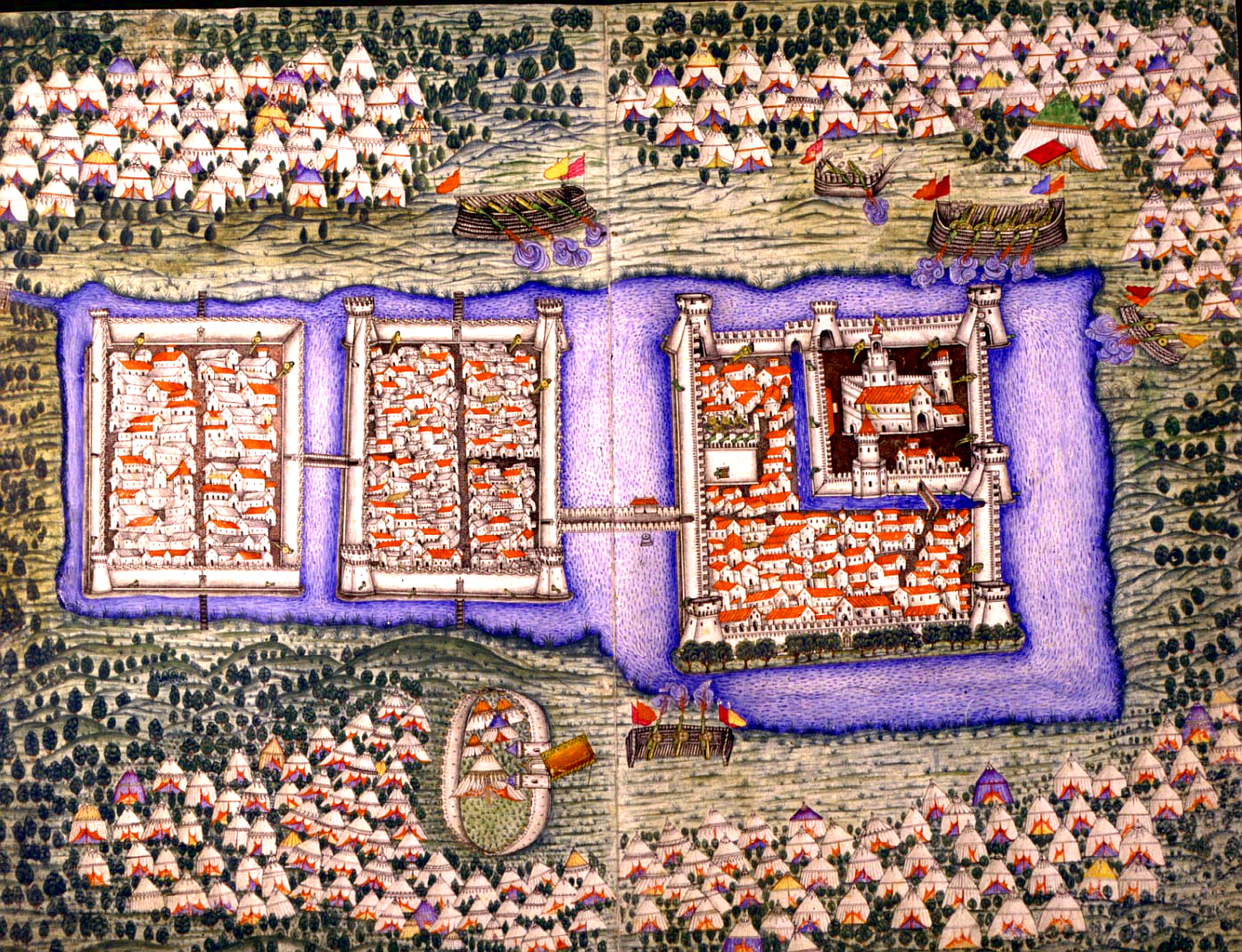
Havale type wooden fortification, which artillery is placed, can be seen surrounding the city, Siege of Szigetvár (1566).

Havale, which is the fortification that palanka was inspired by, acted as a base for troops and artillery during sieges of the early Ottoman era. 15th century Ottoman historian Aşıkpaşazade mentions that this kind of fortresses were built during the Siege of Bursa (1326). Havale type forts were also built during the Siege of Sivrihisar in Karaman, and in Giurgiu during the campaign to Hungary (1435–36) by Murad II.

== Gallery ==
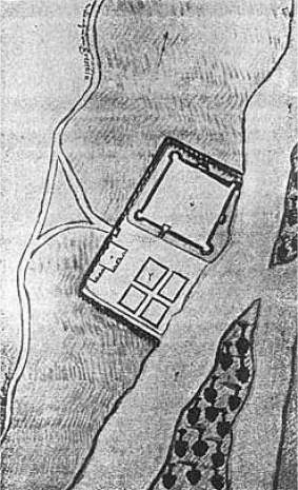
Palanka Ádony

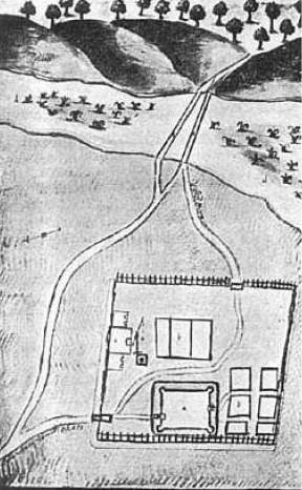
Palanka Baranyavar

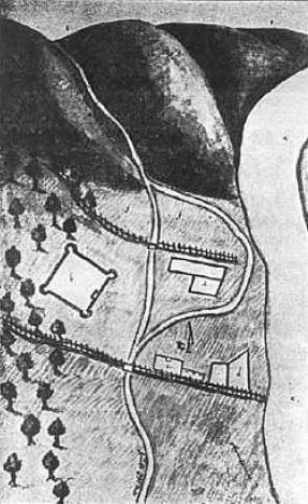
Palanka Paks

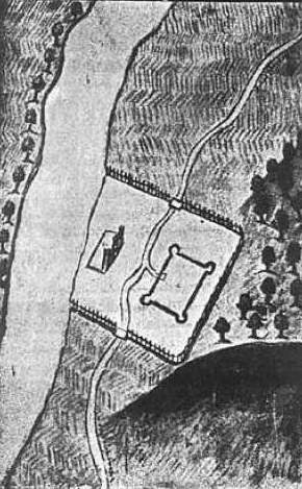
Palanka Szeksard

== Related towns ==
=== Serbia ===
- Bačka Palanka
- Smederevska Palanka
- Bela Palanka
- Brza Palanka
- Banatska Palanka

=== Macedonia ===
- Kriva Palanka

=== Bosnia and Herzegovina ===
- Lušci Palanka

== See also ==
- "palanque", French for small fort surrounded by wooden palisade

== Bibliography ==
- Nicolle, David (2010). Ottoman Fortifications 1300-1710 [Osmanlı Kaleleri 1300-1810]. Translated by Şakul, Kahraman. Osprey Publishing.
- Murphey, Rhoads (1999). Ottoman Warfare 1500-1700 (PDF). United Kingdom: UCL Press.
- Özgüven, Burcu (2009). "Palanka Forts and Construction Activity in the Late Ottoman Balkans". The Frontiers of the Ottoman World. A.C.S. Peacock.
- Stein, Mark L. (2007). Guarding the Frontier: Ottoman Border Forts and Garrisons in Europe. Tauris Academic Studies.
