= Museum of Shipbuilding and the Fleet =

Maritime museum in Mykolaiv, Ukraine

Coordinates: 46°58′41″N 31°59′10″E

The Museum of Shipbuilding and Fleet
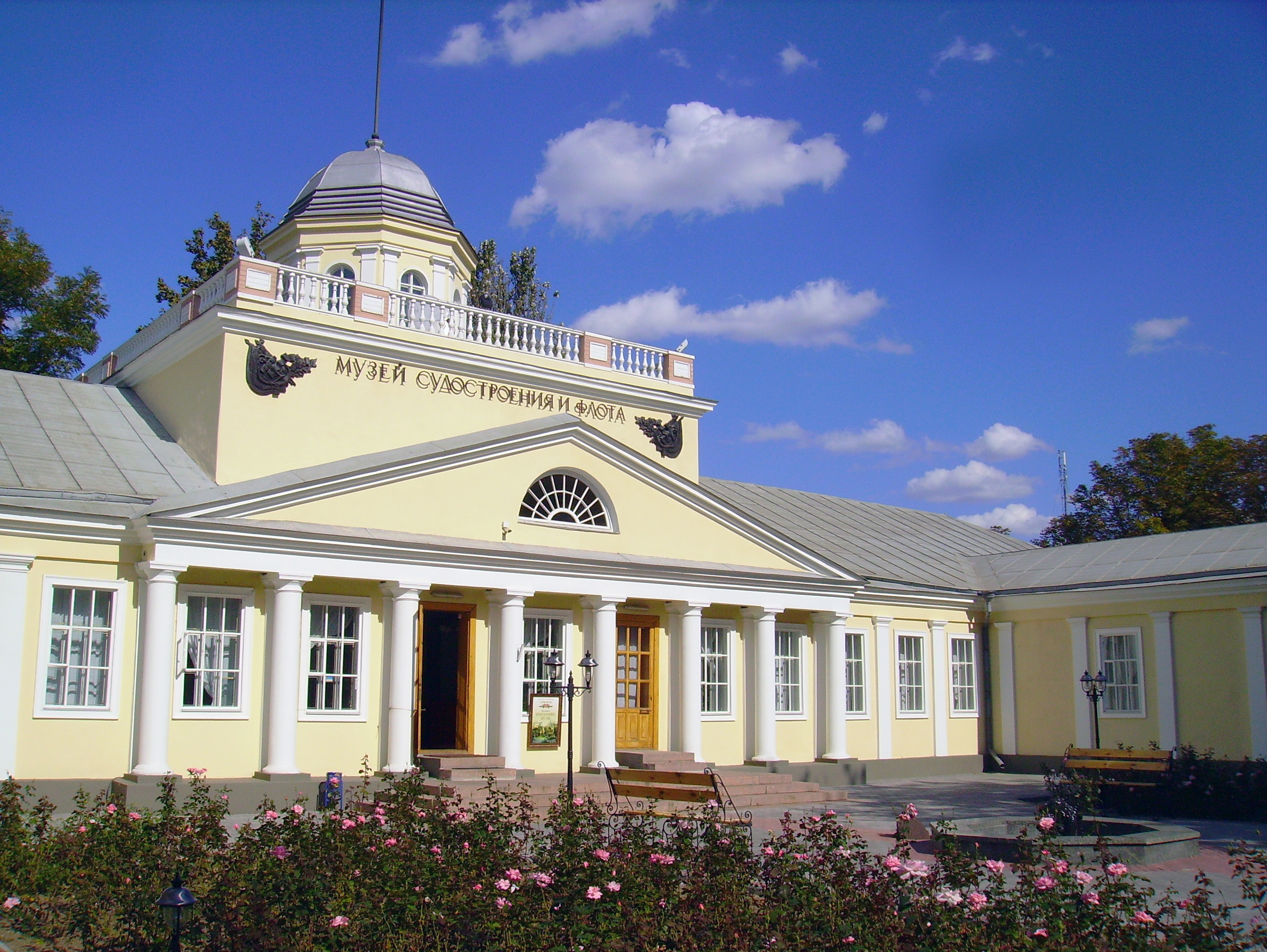
- Established: 1978
- Location: Mykolaiv, Ukraine
- Website: museum.mk.ua/branch/muzei-sudnobuduvannya-i-flotu/

The Museum of Shipbuilding and Fleet (Ukrainian: Музей суднобудування і флоту) is a museum dedicated to shipbuilding located in Mykolaiv, Ukraine.

== History of the museum ==
Ancient House, where the museum is situated, is a monument of history and architecture of the late 18th – early 19th century. Built in the style of the Russian classicism, it served as chancery and premises of the main commanders of the Black Sea Fleet during 1794–1900. In due time such admirals as M. S. Mordvinov, I. De Traverse, A. S. Greig, M. P. Lazarev, G. I. Butakov, M. A. Arcas lived and worked here.

== Exhibitions ==
The museum exhibition is located in twelve rooms and numbers nearly 3,000 exhibits. Exhibits in the first hall depict items of antiquity and from the time of the Kievan Rus, and describe the beginning of navigation through the Dnipro and Southern Bug rivers, the Black Sea and the Mediterranean Sea. There are pictures of ancient Greek ships, illustrations of a deserved painter V. Bahtov to the "Histories" of Herodotus, archeological finds of antique Olbia, fragments of stony anchors. Exhibits which are devoted to the fleet history of Zaporizhian Cossacks and their heroic combat for access to the Black Sea are of great interest.

The pearl of the museum is the diorama "Building the ships on the Mykolaiv Admiralty in the first quarter of the 19th century" by V. Semernev.

In the hall of the Crimean War (1853–1856) the authentic relics of the past are located: the naval flag of St. Andrew, ship cannons, awards and documents of seamen and veterans of war.

The bust of sailor Ignat Shevchenko (sculptor G. Kovalchuk), who performed a heroic deed during the defense of Sevastopol, also attracts the attention of visitors. The Crimean War was a milestone in the transition from sailing ships to steam ships. Museum exhibits include the model of the first tubular vessel in the Black Sea, the "Novgorod", launched by the Nikolaev Admiralty in 1873 as well as a portrait of the author's draft of the ship, the famous engineer and shipbuilder A. O. Popov.

And on the court, under the expanse of the sky, are the guns from the Black Sea Fleet, covered with glory of combat feats. The best tradition continued in the post-war works of the masters of the ship's business and sailors of the Black Sea. The hall exhibits items of ship's equipment, fragments of shells of ships, maritime communications devices and collection of ship tableware. The exhibit section "modern civilian fleet – the end of the 1940–1990s." tells about the activities of Europe's largest Black Sea Shipyard, one of the oldest companies in the south of Ukraine shipyard named after 61 Communards, and the youngest in the Mykolaiv shipyard "Okean".
