= Pilia =

Scientific classification
- Kingdom: Animalia
- Phylum: Arthropoda
- Subphylum: Chelicerata
- Class: Arachnida
- Order: Araneae
- Infraorder: Araneomorphae
- Family: Salticidae
- Subfamily: Salticinae
- Genus: Pilia; Simon, 1902

Type species
- P. saltabunda Simon, 1902

Species
- P. albicoma Szombathy, 1915 – New Guinea; P. escheri Reimoser, 1934 – India; P. saltabunda Simon, 1902 – India

Genus of spiders

Pilia is a genus of jumping spiders that was first described by Eugène Louis Simon in 1902. As of August 2019 it contains only four species, found only in India and Papua New Guinea: P. albicoma, P. escheri, P. saltabunda and P. malenadu.
