= Houde Bimax =

French ultralight aircraft

Bimax

General information
- Type: Ultralight aircraft
- National origin: France
- Manufacturer: Patrice Houde
- Designer: Patrice Houde
- Status: In production (2011)

History
- Introduction date: September 2010

The Houde Bimax is a French ultralight aircraft, designed and produced by Patrice Houde, introduced at the Blois homebuilt aircraft fly-in in September 2010. The aircraft is supplied as a complete ready-to-fly-aircraft.

== Design and development ==
The Bimax was designed to comply with the Fédération Aéronautique Internationale microlight rules. It features a cantilever low-wing, a two-seats-in-tandem enclosed cockpit under a bubble canopy, fixed conventional landing gear and a single engine in tractor configuration.

The aircraft is made from wood, with its flying surfaces covered in doped aircraft fabric. Its 8.25 m (27.1 ft) span wing is detachable for ground transportation and storage. Standard engines available are the 80 hp (60 kW) Rotax 912UL and the 100 hp (75 kW) Rotax 912ULS four-stroke powerplants.

== Specifications (Bimax) ==
Data from Bayerl and Tacke

General characteristics

- Crew: one
- Capacity: one passenger
- Wingspan: 8.25 m (27 ft 1 in)
- Empty weight: 278 kg (613 lb)
- Gross weight: 472.5 kg (1,042 lb)
- Fuel capacity: 110 litres (24 imp gal; 29 US gal)
- Powerplant: 1 × Rotax 912UL four cylinder, liquid and air-cooled, four stroke aircraft engine, 60 kW (80 hp)

Performance

- Maximum speed: 250 km/h (160 mph, 130 kn)
- Cruise speed: 210 km/h (130 mph, 110 kn)
- Stall speed: 64 km/h (40 mph, 35 kn)
- Never exceed speed: 280 km/h (170 mph, 150 kn)
