= Kéran Prefecture =

Coordinates: 9.9500°N 1.0500°E

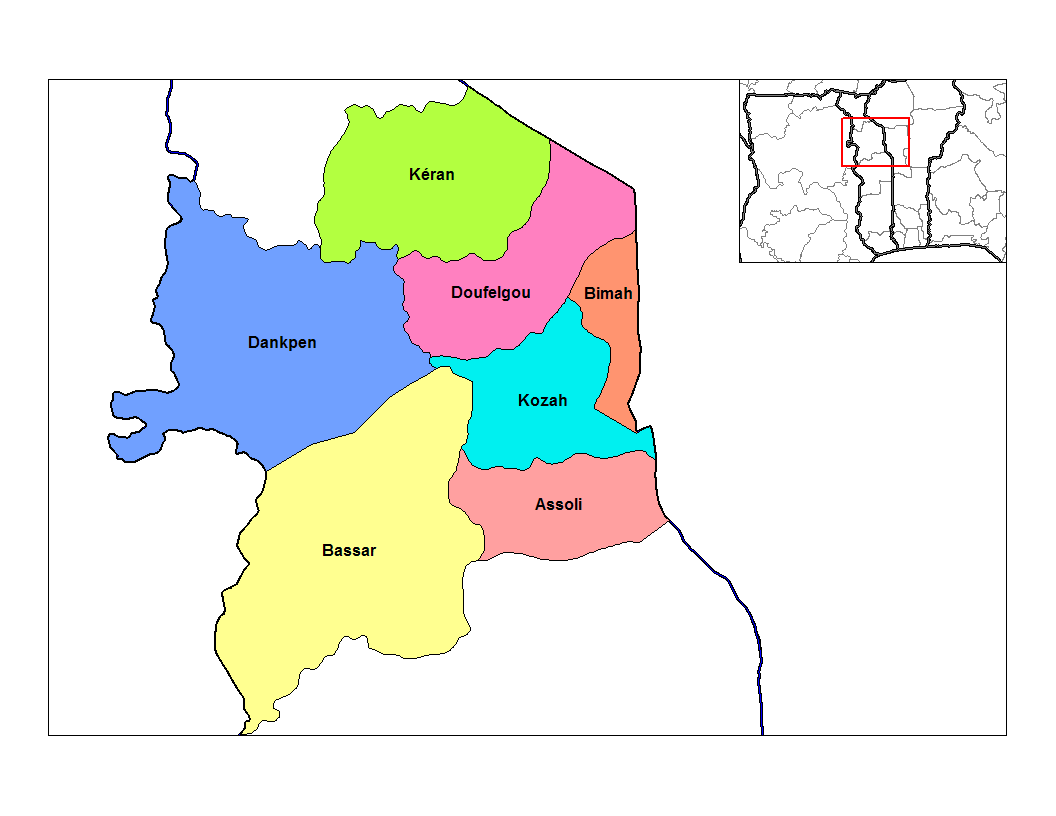
Prefectures of Kara

Kéran is a prefecture located in the Kara Region of Togo. The prefecture covers 1,967 km^{2}, with a population in 2022 of 128,687. The capital city is Kandé. The cantons (or subdivisions) of Kéran include Kantè, Atalotè, Pessidè, Tamberma-Est (Koutougou), Tamberma-Ouest (Nadoba), Hélota, Warengo, Akponté, Ossacré.
