= Battle of Mykolaiv =

Battle in the Russian invasion of Ukraine

Coordinates: 46°58′30″N 31°59′42″E

- Part of the southern front of the Russian invasion of Ukraine
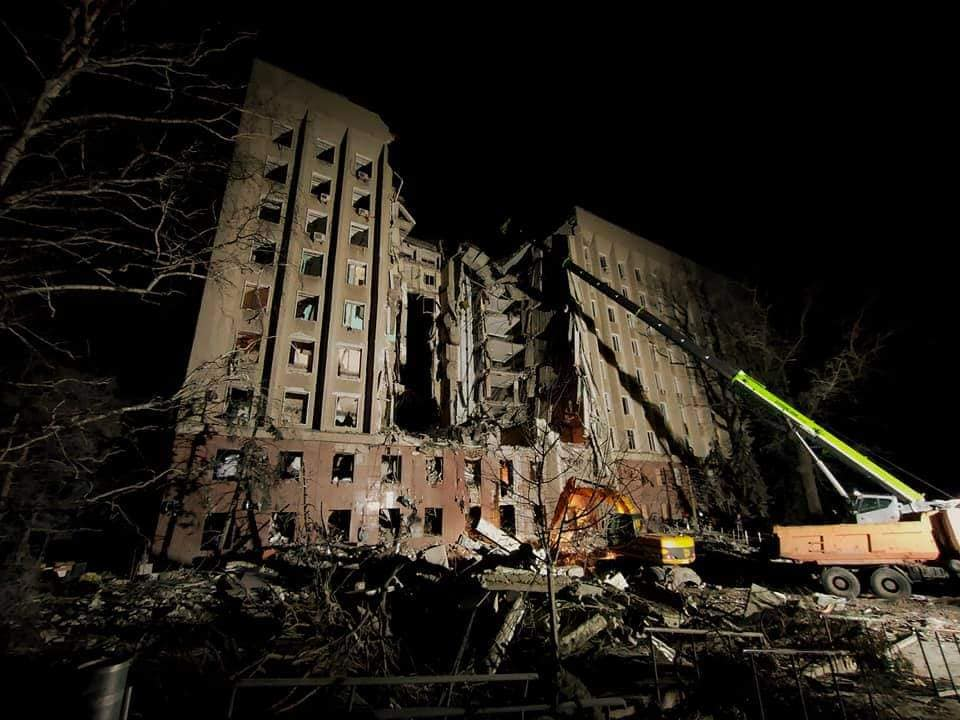
- Mykolaiv Regional State Administration after a Russian rocket strike, 29 March 2022
| Date | 26 February – 8 April 2022 (1 month, 1 week and 6 days) |
| Location | Mykolaiv Oblast, Ukraine |
| Result | Ukrainian victory |

Belligerents
| Russia | Ukraine |

Commanders and leaders
| | Dmytro Marchenko; Vitaliy Kim |

Units involved
| 7th Guards Mountain Air Assault Division (Note: The 56th Guards Air Assault Regiment, 108th Guards Air Assault Regiment and 247th Guards Air Assault Regiment have been specifically reported) | 28th Mechanized Brigade; 59th Motorized Brigade; 79th Air Assault Brigade; 35th Marine Brigade; 36th Marine Brigade; 19th Public Order Protection Regiment; Mykolaiv Oblast Patrol Police; Khyzhak Special Detachment; Territorial Defense Forces |

Casualties and losses
| Per Ukraine: 470+ killed 300+ wounded | Per Ukraine: 120+ killed 8 missing 133+ wounded Frigate Hetman Sahaidachny scuttled |
- 128+ civilians killed, 545+ wounded 250,000 civilians evacuated

The battle of Mykolaiv started on the night of 26 February 2022, as part of the southern Ukraine campaign during the Russian invasion of Ukraine. It ended with Russian forces being repulsed from the city in March, and by April all but a few of its surrounding villages were back under Ukrainian control.

Mykolaiv is a strategically important shipbuilding and port city on the Black Sea and on 4 March was "seen as the next key stepping-stone for Russian forces on the road to Odesa."

== Background ==
Mykolaiv's Kulbakyne military airbase, the headquarters of the 299th Tactical Aviation Brigade of the Ukrainian Air Force, was bombarded by Russian jets at approximately 05:00 on 24 February, as part of the initial Russian strikes on Ukrainian military bases in the early hours of the invasion. The bombing caused a large fire, but according to a spokesman for the brigade, there were no deaths or injuries.

Dmytro Marchenko, who commanded the defense of the city, said that on 25 February there were no checkpoints, trenches, or patrols in Mykolaiv. Residents were in a state of panic regarding Russian troop movements in nearby Kherson, and a lack of communication among security forces led to friendly fire incidents. Units of the 79th Air Assault Brigade and 36th Marine Brigade, both headquartered in Mykolaiv, had only been ordered to prepare to defend their military bases but not the city itself.

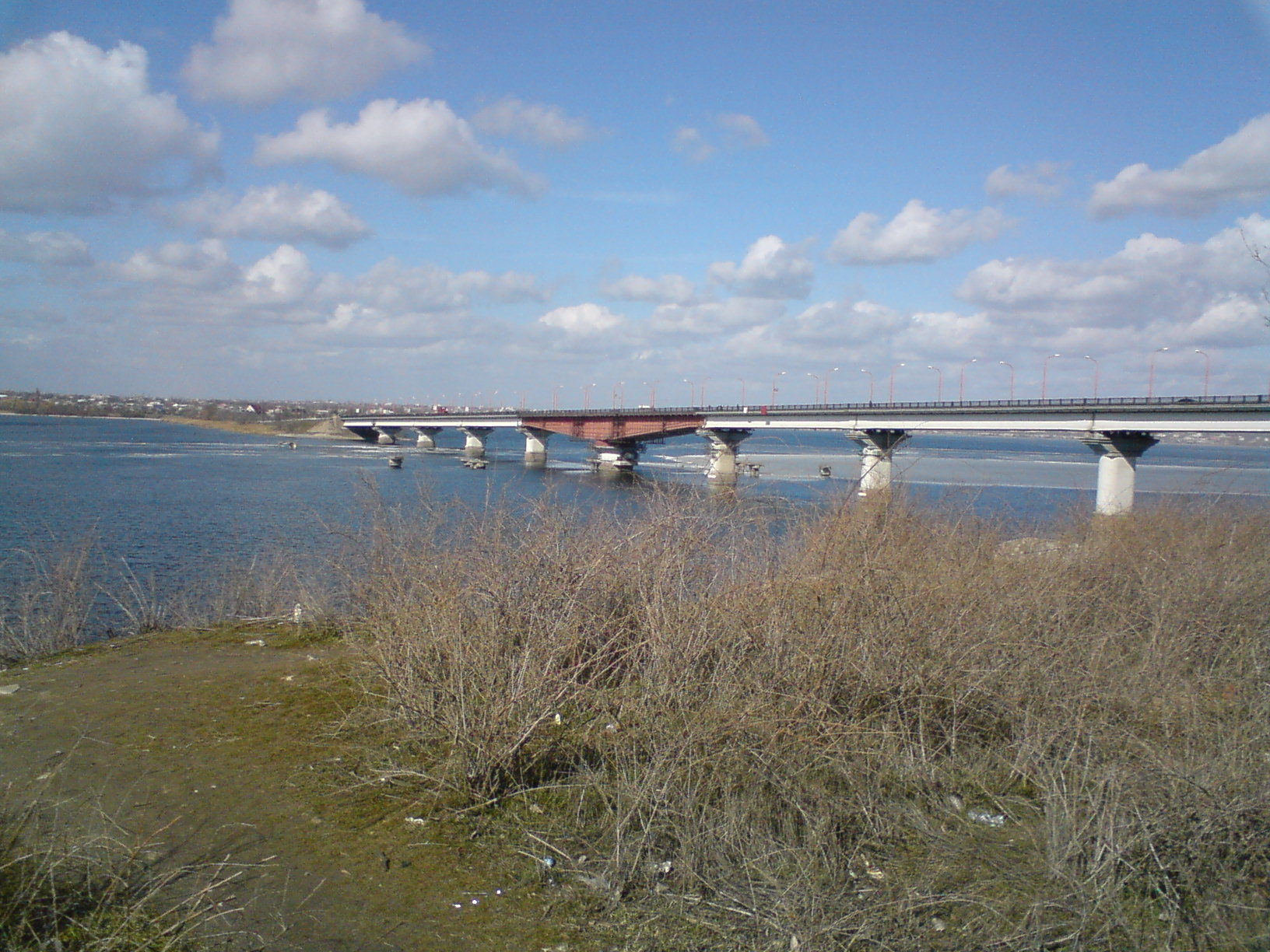
Varvarivskyi Bridge over the Southern Bug River

According to Marchenko, the Russian command sought to surround Mykolaiv in a manner similar to the siege of Mariupol. Over the course of the battle, he reportedly refused eight orders to blow up the Varvarivskyi Bridge over the Southern Bug River, which would have caused the city to become totally encircled.

On 25 February, Russian helicopters attempted to land in the city, leading to a battle with Ukrainian fighters. Vitaliy Kim, the governor of Mykolaiv Oblast, ordered residents not to leave their homes. By the evening, Kim said the situation had "calmed down". The next day, the Territorial Defense Forces captured several Russian saboteurs who had been hiding in the basement of a residential building.

During the afternoon hours of 26 February, a column of 12 Russian tanks began approaching Mykolaiv from the direction of Kakhovka. Kim stated that the city had five hours to prepare for encirclement and urged citizens to prepare barricades and volunteers to defend the city. Artillery and other arms had also been prepared.

== Battle ==
=== First assault ===
Russian tanks entered Mykolaiv around 17:00 on 26 February, with explosions heard in all parts of the city. Russian soldiers, termed "little green men" by locals, were filmed moving through the city's northern micro-district in armored vehicles.

Heavy shooting was audible in the city center. Combat took place near a shopping mall and the Mykolaiv Zoo. A column of tanks was seen moving through Tsentralny Avenue and Sadova Street in the direction of Nikolska Street. Shooting was also heard in the Korabel'nyy Raion, and the Kulbakino Air Base was shelled.

By 21:00, Kim and mayor Oleksandr Senkevych announced that Russian forces had left the city after being repelled by the Territorial Defense Forces, who were awaiting reinforcements from the Ukrainian military. Kim said Russian tanks had withdrawn in the direction of Kherson, towards the village of Luch. Policemen seized weapons from an abandoned Russian armored personnel carrier.

In the aftermath, some Russian soldiers were captured, and the city center was extensively damaged. The next day, the Russian military bombarded Mykolaiv International Airport, and Senkevych said that a Russian column from Crimea was moving through Kherson Oblast in the direction of Mykolaiv. The mayor also announced that bridges in the city had been mined and would be detonated in the case of a Russian breakthrough.

=== Second assault ===
On 28 February, Russian troops advanced from Kherson towards Mykolaiv, reaching the city's outskirts and launching an assault at 11:00 a.m. local time.

There was a lull in fighting on 1 March, with no airstrikes or artillery bombardment recorded the previous night. A column of Russian military vehicles left the environs of Mykolaiv, moving back in the direction of Kherson. Some bridges had been destroyed by the Ukrainian military. Sienkevych said it was unknown when the city would come under attack again, but defensive preparations were necessary.

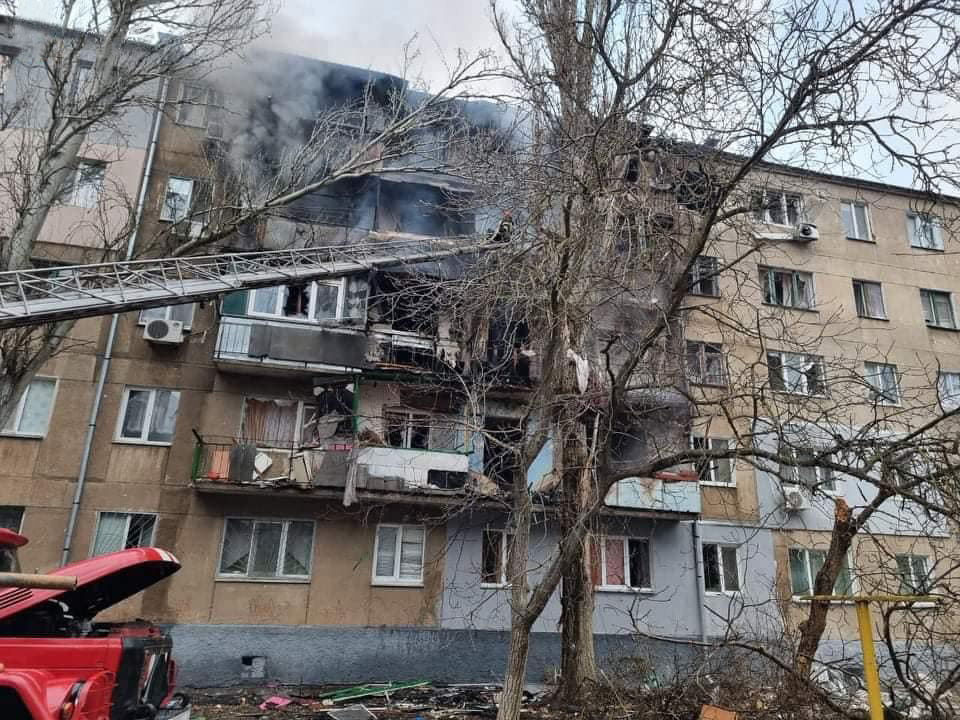
Destroyed residential buildings in Mykolaiv.

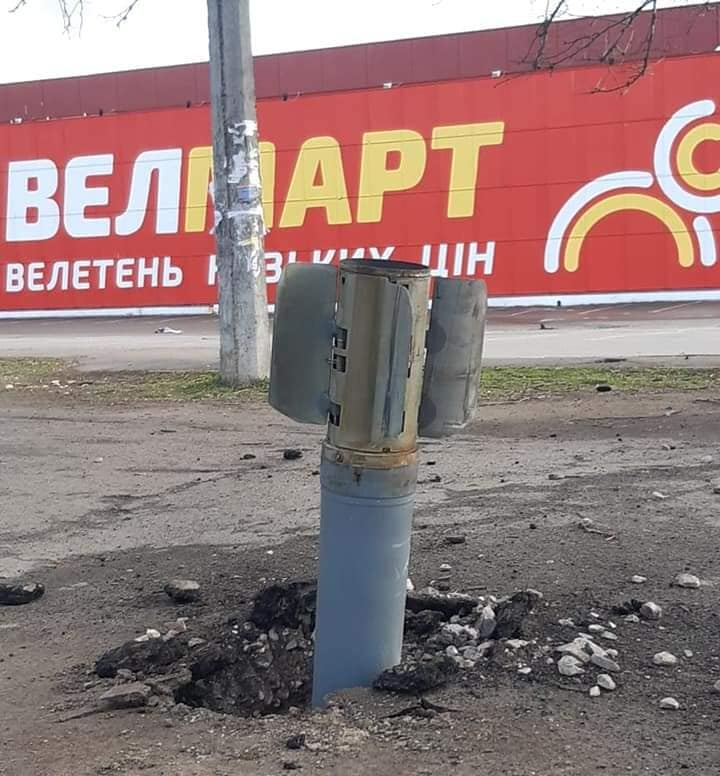
Rocket from a multiple rocket launcher in Mykolaiv, 9 March

On 1 March, according to Ukrainian officials, a Russian column near the city of Bashtanka, north of Mykolaiv, was defeated by Ukrainian forces. According to a video taken of the engagement, 800 wheeled vehicles were destroyed, including D-30A howitzers, BTR-80 APCs, Pantsir missile system vehicles and ammunition supply trucks. The Ukrainians had also detained 28 Russian soldiers who had taken part in "hostilities" in Bashtanka. On 2 March, another Russian column was defeated at the city of Voznesensk, northwest of Mykolaiv, by Ukrainian regular army troops, members of the Territorial Defense force, and local volunteers.

On 2 March, as Russian forces continued to attempt to encircle Mykolaiv, Kim announced that Russian paratroopers had landed in Balovne, in the northwestern outskirts of the city; he also reported fighting at Kalynivka to the city's east, where Ukrainian artillery had destroyed a bridge to prevent a Russian advance. The Russians later withdrew from Kalynivka in the direction of Bashtanka. Mayor Sienkevych said Mykolaiv was preparing for urban combat, and called on "everyone who could hold a weapon" to join in the city's defense.

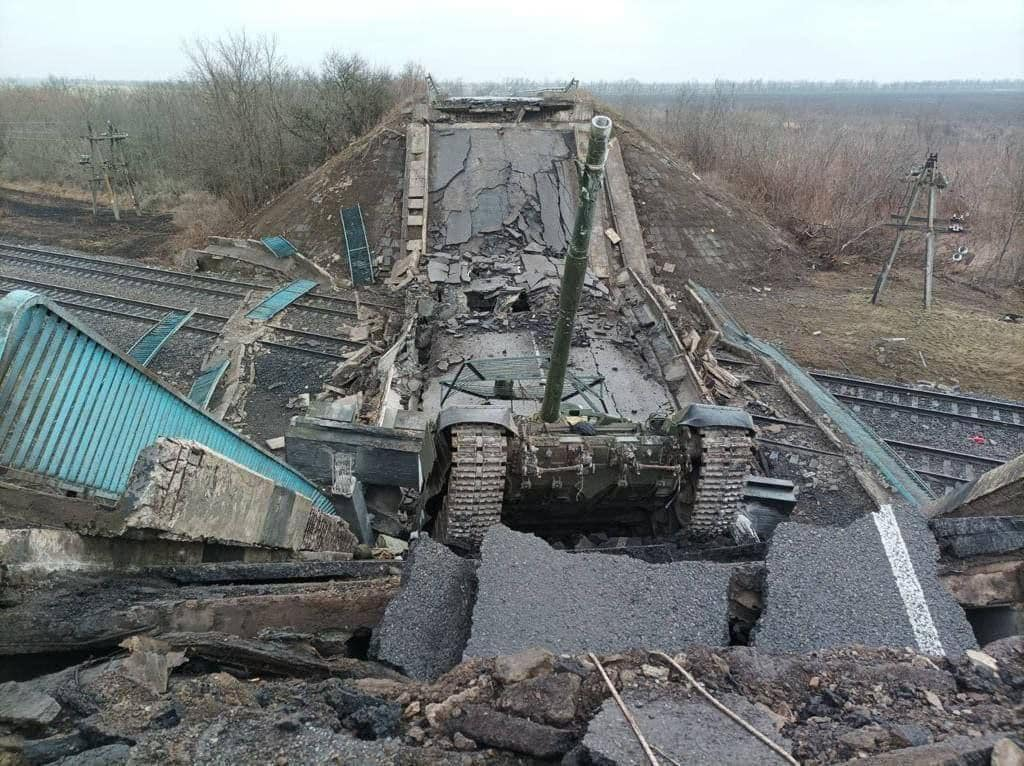
A Russian T-72 tank trapped on a bridge demolished by the Ukrainians in Kalynivka, Mykolaiv Oblast, 2 March

On 3 March, the Ukrainian military claimed that the Russian landing party in Balovne, which it said consisted of airborne troops of Russia's 10th Special Forces Brigade had been "destroyed".

The Ukrainian Navy scuttled their only frigate and the flagship of the Ukrainian Navy, Hetman Sahaidachny, in the port of Mykolaiv on or before 3 March. On that day, a photo was published showing the frigate partially sunk in port. On 4 March, the Ukrainian Defence Minister confirmed that Hetman Sahaidachny had been scuttled to prevent its capture by the Russian forces.

=== Third assault ===
According to Dmytro Marchenko, one of the key battles during the defense of Mykolaiv took place on 4 March. Hundreds of Russian tanks moved towards the city from three directions: Stanislav to the south, Posad-Pokrovske to the southeast, and from the north, down the highway connecting Mykolaiv and Kropyvnytskyi. Two Russian BTRs entered the Kulbakynskyi airfield, which Marchenko recognized as a feint designed to draw out Ukrainian reserves and artillery. He sent police forces to recapture the airfield while focusing the artillery on the main Russian force, thus breaking up the attack.

=== Ukrainian counteroffensive ===
Kim later announced that Russian troops were driven out of the city but were counterattacking. Ukrainian soldiers recaptured Kulbakino Air Base. Mayor Oleksandr Senkevich said that Russian troops were attacking the city from the north, east and south. Ukrainian troops held a single swing bridge spanning the Southern Buh, the easiest route for Russian forces to reach the port of Odesa. Russian forces were later forced to retreat back beyond the city limits, pushed out of the city outskirts by Ukrainian troops led by Dmytro Marchenko. Marchenko received the Ukrainian Order for Courage for his role in defending the city.

On 5 March, Kim said that Russian tanks were approaching the city in the direction of Kulbakyne airfield. Some hours later, he announced that Ukrainian fighters had captured Russian vehicles. He also claimed that Russian forces bombarded Ukrainian positions three times with Smerch rocket launchers, injuring three soldiers. The Ukrainians responded with their own salvo, reportedly killing 70 Russian soldiers and wounding 300.

On 7 March, ten Ukrainian soldiers were killed and dozens of others were wounded in a Russian airstrike on the barracks of the 79th Air Assault Brigade at 05:15. Kim later stated that Ukrainian forces had recaptured Mykolaiv International Airport and civilians could now leave the city. At 05:00 Russian troops began shelling the city and a Kalibr cruise missile hit a military barracks, killing eight soldiers and wounding 19, while another eight were missing. Heavy clashes took place to the east of the city and a tank battle broke out at the airport. The shelling stopped around the evening, with Ukrainian forces declaring they had repelled the Russian assault.

On 8 March, a Russian battalion tactical group unsuccessfully attempted offensive operations towards Ternivka district in Mykolaiv and was driven back to Russian "force concentration areas" near Kapustyne, Balovne, and Novomatviyivske.

Kim claimed on 11 March that Ukrainian forces had pushed Russian troops back to the east by 15–20 kilometres (9–12 mi) and had also surrounded some units who were negotiating for a surrender. He said that the Russian force that attacked the city was relatively weak, but warned that a stronger one could easily capture the city. The head doctor of a local hospital, Oleksandr Dimyanov, said that 250 Ukrainian soldiers and civilians had been wounded during the battle, of whom 12 died.

Russian forces still controlled villages 20 kilometres (12 mi) away, with only the Southern Bug River keeping the city from being encircled. Senkevich told The Guardian that civilians were being evacuated through the road leading to Odesa, and about 250,000 had been evacuated. On 12 March, fighting took place in the villages of Buzke, Sukhyi Yelanets and Huriivka.

Civilians stacked tires on city streets in the battle, and burned them using Molotov cocktails to slow down Russian troops if they entered the city, so Ukrainian troops could target their tanks. Kim meanwhile organized the defenses and motivated people through videos he posted on social media. Sgt. Ruslan Khoda, who commanded the Ukrainian forces defending the airport, stated that Russian troops seemed to be mounting probing attacks to test vulnerabilities in their defenses and they were often preceded by surveillance drones. Maj. Gen. Dmytro Marchenko, who was leading the city's defense, stated that Ukrainian forces were trying to break the morale of Russian troops by repeatedly shelling them.

Units of Ukraine's 28th Mechanized Brigade went on the offensive south of the city on 12 March, when they captured the villages of Prybuzke and Ukrainka. The brigade took Luch, Posad-Pokrovske, and Stepova Dolyna by 14-15 March. Meanwhile, units of Ukraine's 59th Motorized Brigade recaptured Shevchenkove, Kotliareve, Zelenyi Hai, Olenivka, and Kostiantynivka east of Mykolaiv.

The road between Mykolaiv and Nova Odesa returned to Ukrainian control on 14 March, and on 15 March, Kim claimed that Ukrainian forces had pushed back Russian forces from the city center. Yuri Biryukov, an associate of Major General Dmitry Marchenko, commander of the Nikolaev defense forces, claimed on 15 March their troops had killed 200 Russians and had taken "trophy heaps of weapons and ammunition". On the same date, Russian forces were also said to have been pushed out of areas on the border between Mykolaiv Oblast and Kherson Oblast, which was expected to result in a reduction of shelling on the city. On 18 March, Ukrainian forces reportedly broke through Russian lines at Mykolaiv, pushing them back into Kherson Oblast.

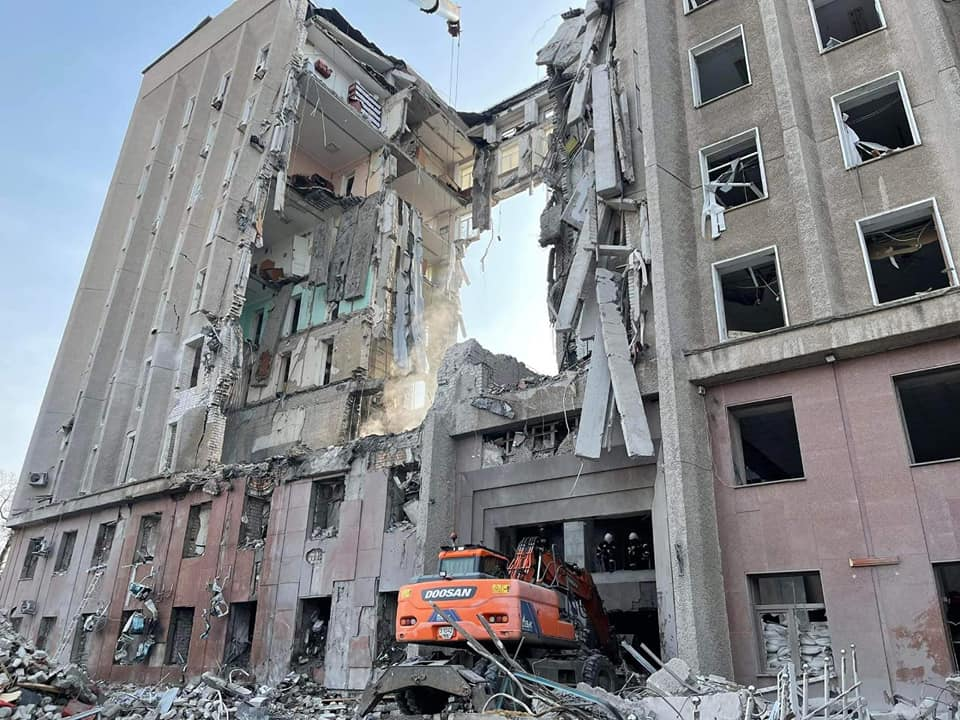
Mykolaiv Regional State Administration after Russian rocket strike on 29 March

On 18 March, two Russian Kalibr missiles, fired from either nearby Kherson or Crimea, struck a Ukrainian army barracks of the 36th Separate Marine Brigade (headquartered in Mykolaiv), used to train local soldiers, located in the northern suburbs of Mykolaiv. The attack occurred during the night, while the soldiers were asleep in their bunks. Not enough time was available to sound the alarm, as the missiles were fired from too close, from the vicinity of Kherson. The Belgian newspaper Het Laatste Nieuws reported that the city morgue and the Ukrainian army stated that at least 80 Ukrainian soldiers were killed, and their bodies recovered. However, the BBC reported that out of the 200 soldiers in the barracks, only one man was pulled from out of the rubble 30 hours after the attack. Two years after the attack, Ukrainian media updated the toll to 110 killed servicemen and 100 wounded.

On 19 March, the Ukrainian General Staff claimed to have killed 200 "DPR mobilized soldiers" over the past two days, and that others had become "demoralized" and refused to fight.

27 March was the first full day that Mykolaiv was not shelled. On 8 April, Kim claimed that "practically no" Russian forces remained in the Mykolaiv region, except for in Snihurivka and a few villages in the southern part of the oblast.

== Aftermath and later attacks ==
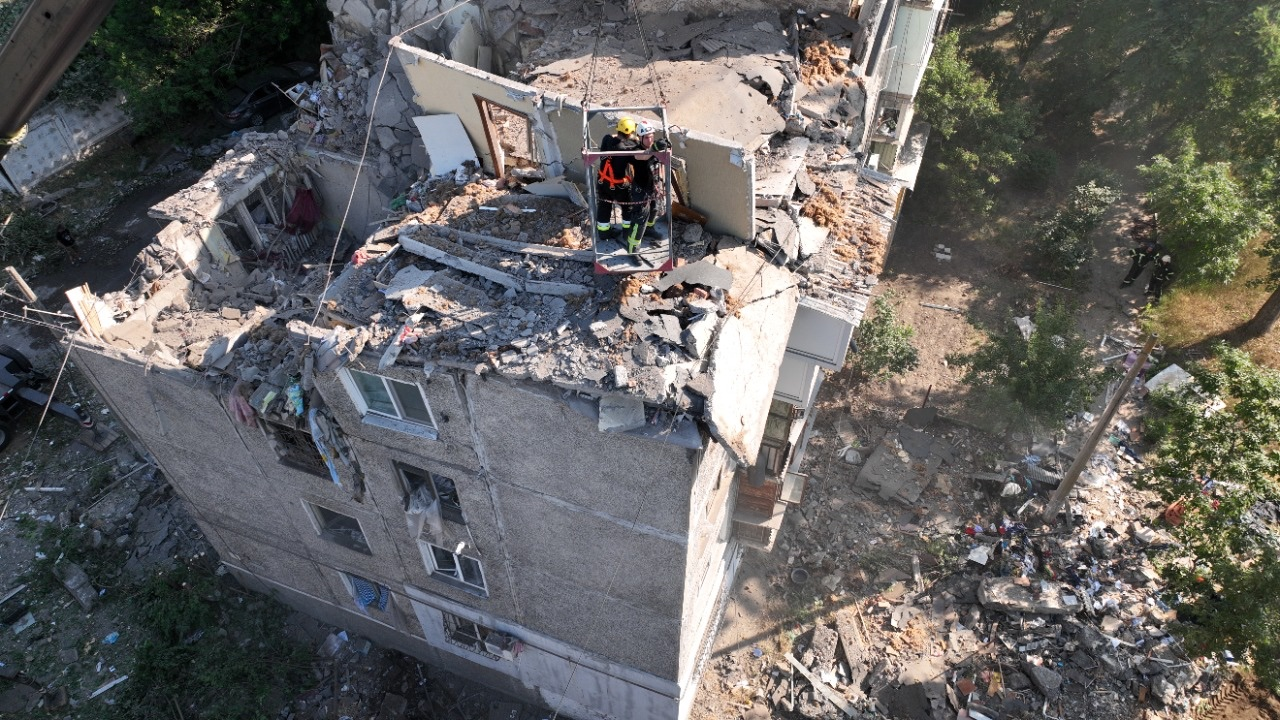
The house shelled on 29 June

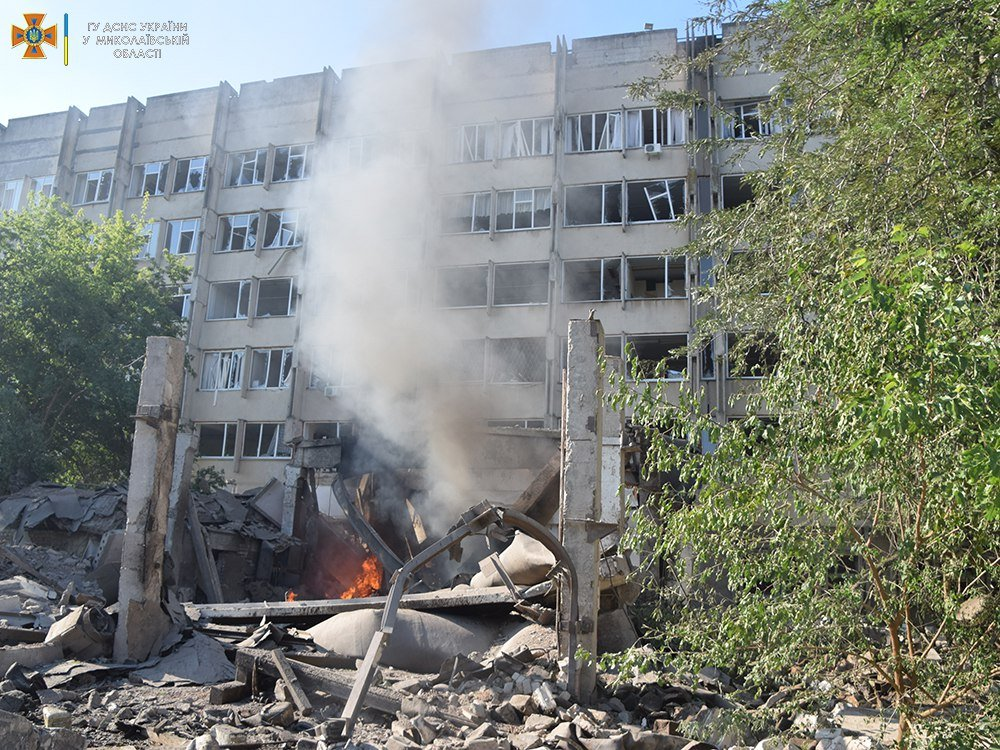
University of Shipbuilding shelled on 15 July

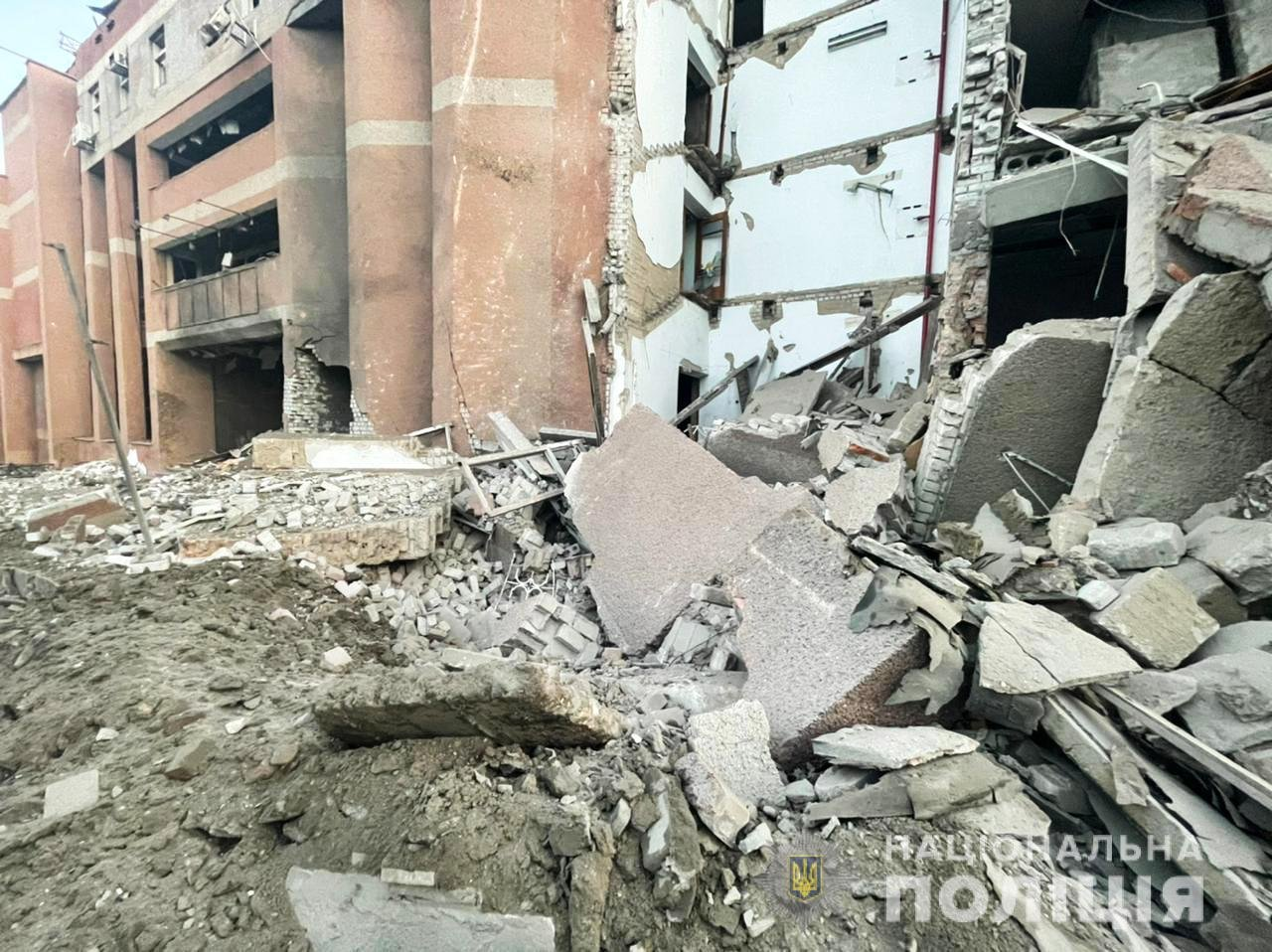
Petro Mohyla Black Sea State University shelled in August

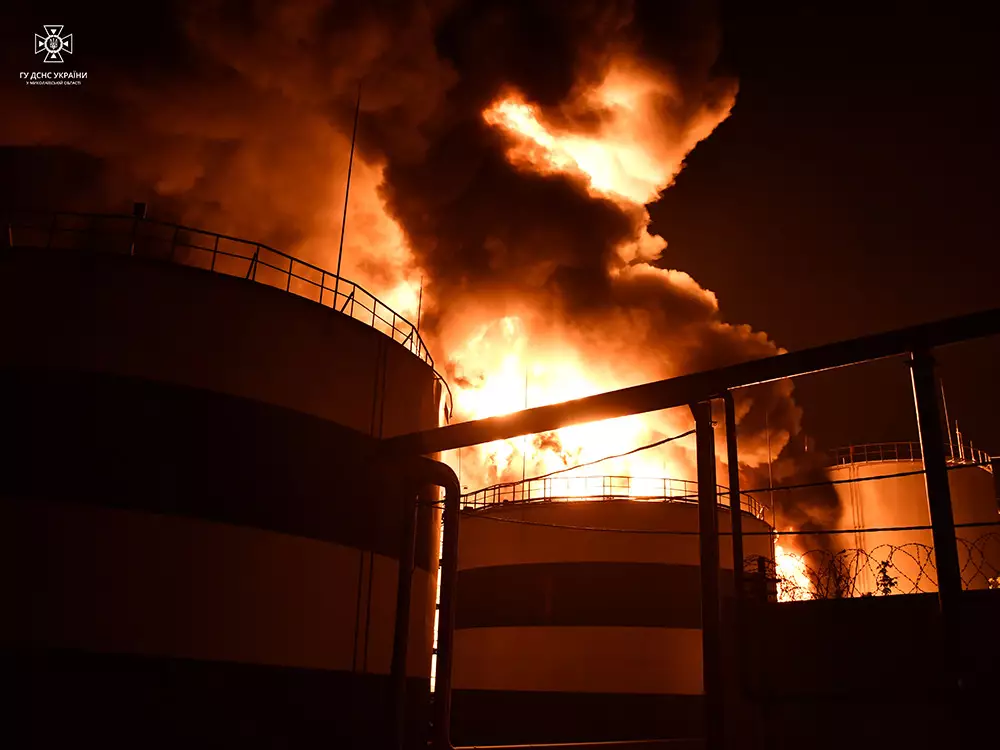
Tanks with sunflower oil attacked on 16 October

Zelenskyy named Mykolaiv a Hero City of Ukraine on 24 March, in recognition of its resistance to Russian attacks.

However, as of 16 April, Russian forces continued shelling the city. Cruise missile attacks also continued, although the city remained in Ukrainian control.

On 12 April, the city lost its main water supply as a result of damage to the pipeline bringing fresh water from the Dnieper. Subsequently the people in Mykolaiv were forced to rely on water from rivers and streams as well as donations from neighboring towns and cities. The head of Mykolaiv regional military administration Vitalii Kim promised to get the water supply back to half capacity in the following days using wells, water purification equipment and desalination plants. A month later, water supply from Southern Bug was established, but this water is brackish, dirty and isn't suitable for drinking or cooking. According to a BBC investigation, Russian forces deliberately broke the pipeline with explosive charge. The exiled governor of the Kherson region at that time, Dmytro Butrii, told the BBC that the Russian occupation forces did not allow a repair team to access it.

On 5 May, the Russian Defence Ministry claimed that its missiles destroyed a large ammunition depot in Mykolaiv.

On 22 June, Ukrainian authorities reported that Russian forces launched seven missiles at Mykolaiv. According to the Russian Defence Ministry, the strike conducted by the Russian Aerospace Forces killed up to 500 servicemen of the 59th Motorized Brigade located in the Okean shipbuilding plant and destroyed a fuel terminal in the city.

The relentless attacks ended in November as the front line was pushed back in the course of the 2022 Kherson counteroffensive.

== Casualties and war crimes ==
Olha Dierugina, the director of the forensic institute of Mykolaiv, told Agence France-Presse that their morgue had received 120 bodies during the battle, including 80 soldiers and 30 civilians. Some of the dead also included Russian soldiers.

A cancer hospital and an eye clinic were bombed on 12 March. On 13 March, Kim stated that a gas turbine factory had been bombed by the Russians. He later said that nine people had been killed in the attack.

According to a report by The New York Times on 16 March, 132 bodies were housed at the city's morgue.

On 29 March, a Russian missile strike had hit the regional administration's headquarters in Mykolaiv. 37 people had been killed and at least 33 injured.

== See also ==
- Battle of Kherson
- Mykolaiv cluster bombing
- Russian occupation of Mykolaiv Oblast
- Pavel Filatyev, former Russian soldier who participated in the battle
