= Mykola Romanchuk =

Ukrainian politician (born 1957)

Hero of Ukraine Mykola Romanchuk
- Микола Романчук
- Romanchuk in November 2014.

Governor of Mykolaiv Oblast
- In office 2 March 2014 – 28 July 2014
- President: Oleksandr Turchynov (acting); Petro Poroshenko
- Preceded by: Hennady Nikolenko (acting)
- Succeeded by: Vadym Merikov

Personal details
- Born: Mykola Pavlovych Romanchuk; 18 April 1957 (age 69) Novoukrainka (Bereznehuvate Raion), Ukrainian SSR, Soviet Union
- Other political affiliations: Our Ukraine
- Education: Admiral Makarov National University of Shipbuilding

Mykola Pavlovych Romanchuk (Ukrainian: Микола Павлович Романчук; born 18 April 1957) is a Ukrainian politician who served as Governor of Mykolaiv Oblast briefly under Oleksandr Turchynov and Petro Poroshenko from March to July 2014.

== Early life ==
Romanchuk was born on 18 April 1957 in the small village of Novoukrainka, which was then part of the Bereznehuvate Raion in the Ukrainian SSR, Soviet Union. After graduating from secondary school, Romanchuk immediately entered the workforce, becoming an apprentice at the Mykolaiv Shipbuilding Technical School (now the Mykolaiv Polytechnic College) from 1972 to 1976. He then briefly moved to become an assembly worker and finisher at the Okean Shipyard, before deciding to complete his mandatory military service in the Soviet Army, which he did in November 1978. Upon returning to Ukraine, he returned to Okean as a production planning engineer for five years, until 1983. He was then appointed Head of the Department of Planning and Dispatch at Okean, which he held until 1987. While working there, he simultaneously graduated from the Admiral Makarov National University of Shipbuilding in Mykolaiv within the Department of Shipbuilding and Ship Repair in 1985. Starting in 1987, he began as a shop foreman for Okean, which he did for nearly a decade, even after Ukrainian independence, until 1996.

Romanchuk later earned his Candidate of Sciences degree from the Admiral Makarov National University of Shipbuilding. His thesis was on the management of complex restructuring projects at shipbuilding enterprises.

== Director of Okean ==
Dock of the Okean shipyard in Mykolaiv.

In late 1996, he was appointed director and acting chairman of the board of Okean, and he was eventually confirmed as full director by the end of the year. At the time of his appointment, Okean was in a severe financial crisis because the Black Sea Shipping Company had ceased funding steamships for Okean to make, and Okean also had numerous unfinished orders, which prevented it from accepting new ones. In order to keep Okean alive, Romanchuk took on a steep 300% interest loan from Oschadbank for billions, but despite this Okean still declared bankruptcy after Itera-Gas sued them over debts. In 1997, Romanchuk signed a contract for unpaid debts to the Dnipro-based company "Convest-Invest", which Romanchuk later refused to recognise. The case eventually went to the Supreme Court of Ukraine, which ruled in favour of Convest-Invest, although Romanchuk still said there were no documents confirming the debt. Okean was later renamed Damen Shipyards Okean after a tender was issued in 1999, which the Dutch company Damen Shipyards Group bought, thus controlling the majority of the shipyard. Damen forced Romanchuk to remove Okean from the list of strategically important state enterprises.

== Political career ==
In 2006, Romanchuk first entered politics, becoming a deputy on the Mykolaiv Oblast Council from Our Ukraine for a term until 2010. While on the council, he attempted to enter national politics in the 2007 Ukrainian parliamentary elections, when he ran with Our Ukraine – People's Self-Defense Bloc (NUNS), but was not selected. During the subsequent 2012 Ukrainian parliamentary elections, he joined the party list of Batkivshchyna at No. 153, but was again not selected.

On 2 March 2014, the acting President of Ukraine, Oleksandr Turchynov, appointed Romanchuk as Governor of Mykolaiv Oblast, replacing Hennady Nikolenko. During his brief tenure as governor, he requested of the judiciary that the Mykolaiv Alumina Plant's attempted buyout of state land near the berthing facilities of the Dnieper-Bug Sea Commercial Port. At the time, the alumina plant was owned by the Russian company Rusal. Romanchuk said to the judiciary that the alumina plant was paying only 11 million hryvnias per year to the State Property Fund of Ukraine to rent five berths also, and that none of the money was going to the city, only to the central State Property Fund. He was eventually dismissed early, though, by the new president, Petro Poroshenko, on 28 July 2014.

== Legal issues ==
On 3 June 2016, he was detained by the Prosecutor's Office of Mykolaiv Oblast and the Security Service of Ukraine (SBU) for taking a bribe of 90,000 dollars. In connection with this, he was immediately removed from the post of First Deputy Head of the Mykolaiv Oblast Administration. The following day, Romanchuk's homes were searched. According to Anatolii Matios, a suitcase with thousands of dollars was found in his home, a large amount of gold jewelry, safes with gold bars, and ancient icons and antiques. In addition, documents were found in which transactions that were alleged to be corrupt were found. However, on 7 June, it was reported that he was hospitalised after a hearing at the Primorsky Court of Odesa, but later escaped from the hospital that same day. Despite this, he appeared at the court the following day again in Odesa, and his bail was set at 5.5 million hryvnias and a mandatory detention of 60 days. His bail was paid on 22 June 2016.

As of 2018, Romanchuk's case is still ongoing under Part 4 of Article 368 of the Criminal Code of Ukraine. The Central District Court of Mykolaiv was still continuing to interrogate witnesses regarding the case. It was reported that the former Deputy Chairman of the Yelanets Raion, Oleg Zaizburg, was convicted of bribery in March 2017 in relation to the case of Romanchuk, although he appealed the verdict in 2018. In 2021, the court of Mykolaiv finally reached a verdict, finding him not guilty and acquitting him. The court found that the Prosecutor's Office of the Military had failed to collect sufficient evidence, and it also established that the Prosecutor's Office did not have authority over the case, and that the matter should have been dealt with by the National Anti-Corruption Bureau of Ukraine (NABU).

== Honours and awards ==
Romanchuk has been awarded the following honours:

- Honoured Worker of the Industry of Ukraine (2001)
- Honorary citizen of Mykolaiv (2003)
- Order of Merit, III degree (2005)
- Hero of Ukraine (Order of State as a civilian, 2007)
