= Dmytro Marchenko =

Ukrainian Major General (born 1978)

- Марченко Дмитро Олександрович
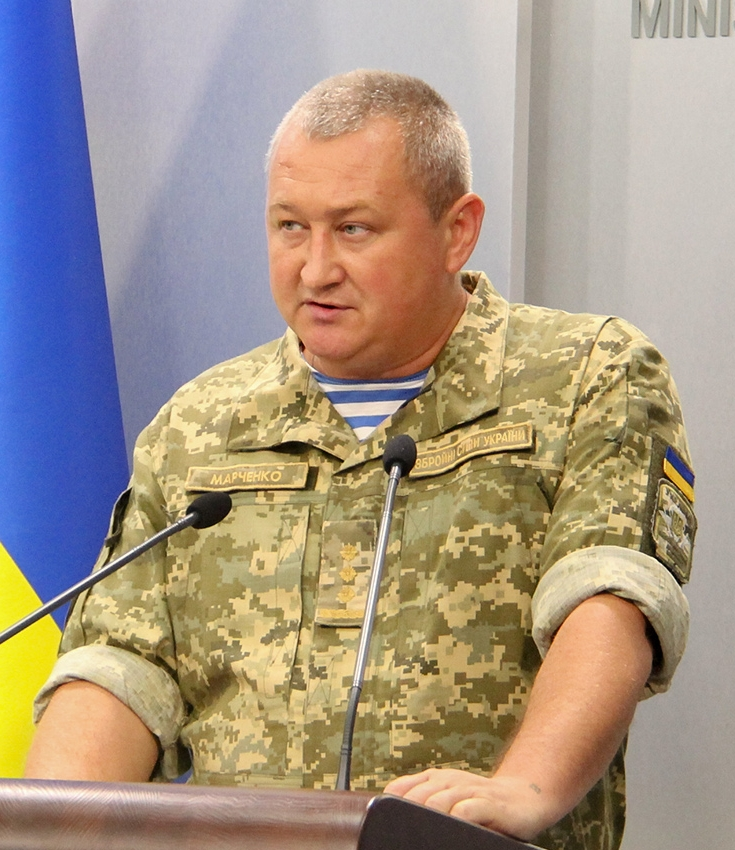
- Marchenko in 2017
- Born: 25 February 1978 (age 48); Voznesensk, Mykolaiv Oblast, Ukrainian SSR, Soviet Union (now Ukraine)
- Education: National Defense University of Ukraine Ivan-Chernyakhovsky
- Military career
- Allegiance: Ukraine
- Branch: Ukrainian Air Assault Forces
- Service years: 1996–2024
- Rank: Major General
- Commands: Commander of the Air Assault Forces
- Conflicts: Russo-Ukrainian war; Russian annexation of Crimea; War in Donbas; First Battle of Donetsk Airport; Second Battle of Donetsk Airport; Battle of Debaltseve; Full-scale invasion of Ukraine; Battle of Mykolaiv; Kherson counteroffensive
- Awards: Order for Courage

Dmytro Oleksandrovych Marchenko (Ukrainian: Дмитро Олександрович Марченко; born 1978) is a retired Ukrainian Major General in the Armed Forces of Ukraine who served in the Russo-Ukrainian War, coming to prominence after the 2022 Russian invasion of Ukraine.

Marchenko defended eastern Ukraine in the early Russo-Ukrainian War. In 2019, he was the subject of a corruption probe by Ukraine's State Investigation Bureau. In the first days of the 2022 Russian invasion, his troops stopped Russia from taking the city of Mykolaiv during the battle of Mykolaiv, making him a national hero and earning him the Order for Courage. In July, he began working as a "senior official for cooperation" between various parties in Mykolaiv and Kherson Oblasts. During the 2022 Kherson counteroffensive, his troops destroyed important Russian military infrastructure around the city of Kherson, waiting to receive aid before they moved into the city. In November, his troops liberated it. He was involved in the Ukrainian counteroffensive from June to December 2023, which was unsuccessful. He retired from the military in November 2024.

== Career ==
=== 2010s ===
The Russo-Ukraine War in eastern Ukraine began in 2014. Marchenko had a role in defending Donetsk Airport and Debaltseve. He later began leading a division of the Ukrainian Defense Ministry tasked with improving the quality of the country's military equipment. In 2019, Ukraine's State Investigation Bureau began a probe into allegations that Marchenko engaged in corruption by providing the Ukrainian military with poor-quality equipment at inflated prices, including "malfunctioning and overpriced bulletproof vests". The Kyiv Independent writes that the probe did not have any results, while Le Monde writes that in November 2019, Marchenko went to prison.

=== 2022 ===
On February 24, 2022, Russia launched a full-scale invasion of Ukraine. At the time, Marchenko was studying at the National Defense University of Ukraine Ivan-Chernyakhovsky in Kyiv. On the 25th, Marchenko was sent by Commander-in-Chief of the Armed Forces of Ukraine, Valerii Zaluzhnyi, to defend the key city of Mykolaiv, in Marchenko's home region. Marchenko worked alongside regional governor Vitalii Kim during the city's defense during the battle of Mykolaiv. Russia started moving in on the city from multiple directions. He later claimed that Russia planned for a successful invasion of the city, as they did not account for civilians resisting. Early into the battle, Marchenko predicted that his troops would be trapped; the city had no infrastructure to stop an invasion, such as trenches or checkpoints. However, civilians did resist, which helped his troops greatly. The Ukrainian military worked with civilians to identify local water channels that Russia was using as shelters and fortifications; the military then hit those positions with artillery. Civilians also helped to dig trenches. Ukraine successfully defended the city, making Marchenko a national hero and earning him the nickname "Defender of Mykolaiv". The battle was a turning point in the war. In March, Marchenko received the Order for Courage for his role. By August, 400 people in the city of Mykolaiv had been detained by Ukraine; Marchenko said there was evidence that each of them had collaborated with the Russians.

In April, Marchenko's role in Mykolaiv was replaced, and he was sent back to Kyiv. Ukrainian President Volodymyr Zelenskyy sent Marchenko back to Mykolaiv after Marchenko received support from Ukraine's former President, Petro Poroshenko. Starting on July 27, "[serving] as a senior official for cooperation between the army, partisan resistance, and the regional military administration" in Mykolaiv and Kherson Oblasts. By the end of March, most of Mykolaiv Oblast was back under the control of Ukraine, and the Russians were pushed back to Kherson Oblast. In June, Marchenko said his troops could win the war with Russia and reoccupy Ukraine's lost territories if Ukraine was "given the right weapons"; this in the context of Ukraine claiming they were not receiving appropriate amounts of weaponry from other Western countries. Also in June, Marchenko said the Kerch Bridge between Russia and Russian-annexed Crimea was the "number one target" for Ukraine, as it would hurt Russia's ability to deliver reserve forces to the front. In October, a part of the bridge exploded in an attack.

Marchenko was commanding during the 2022 Kherson counteroffensive, an attempt to retake the city of Kherson. By August, Ukrainian troops were positioned in trenches around the city. Marchenko said they were waiting to receive new aid, and after that, it "will not be as long as everyone expects" until his troops could move in and take the city. Meanwhile, Marchenko claimed that taking Kherson would mean an end to the "active phase of the war", and that Ukraine planned to liberate Crimea, Luhansk, and Donetsk (which had all been annexed by Russia previously). Ukraine destroyed local infrastructure important to the Russians, such as command centers, ammunition depots, and bridges on the Dnipro River which resupplied units in Kherson. On August 10, Ukraine damaged the bridge at Nova Kakhovka, which was the "last transport artery" for the nearby Russians. On August 12, CNN wrote that Zelenskyy's recent announcement of investigations into a "high-ranking military officer" may have referred to Marchenko. In November, Ukraine liberated Kherson.

=== 2023 ===
In February 2023, Marchenko said that his troops were "starting to run out of resources". That winter, Ukraine took back 10 kilometers on the left bank of the Dnipro River, to gather intelligence and make it easier for Ukrainian troops to cross the river when they would be given an order to start a new counteroffensive in the region. The new counteroffensive started in June 2023. The operation failed by the end of the year.

In November 2023, amidst Valerii Zaluzhnyi's public rift with Volodymyr Zelenskyy, Marchenko said in an interview that he would like to see Zaluzhnyi as a presidential candidate; days later, after his comment spurred public debate over if Zaluzhnyi will be a presidential candidate, Marchenko apologized for his comments, saying “Please do not manipulate my statements, do not engage in discrediting [Zaluzhnyi].”

=== 2024 ===
On November 8, 2024, Marchenko announced his retirement from the military for health reasons.
