= 19th Public Order Regiment (Ukraine) =

- 19-й полк охорони громадського порядку (Ukrainian)
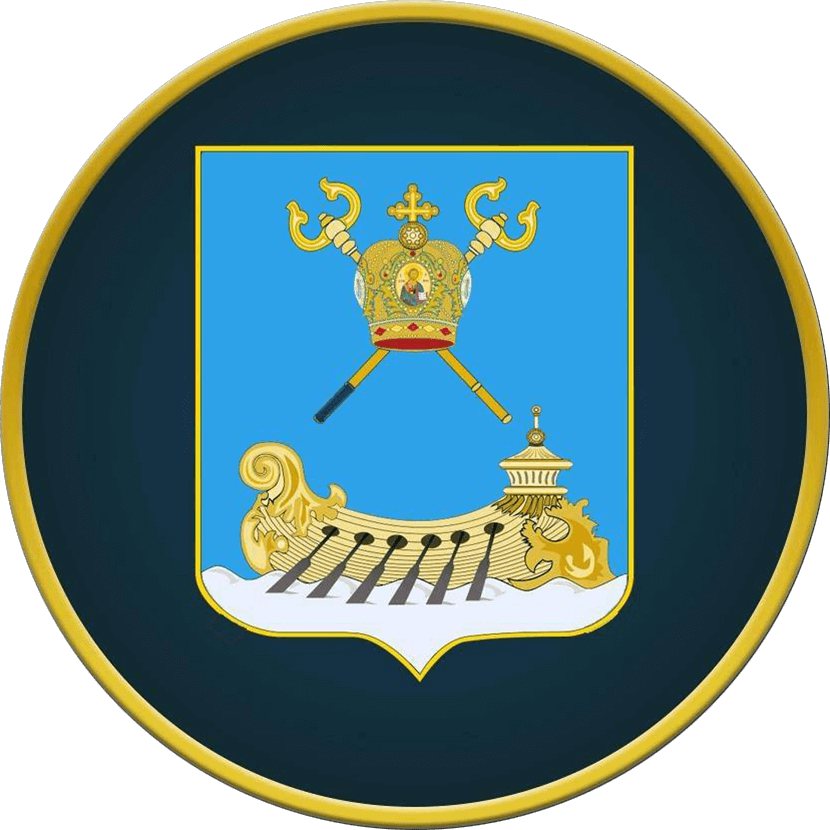
- Regiment Insignia
- Founded: 1992
- Country: Ukraine
- Allegiance: Ministry of Internal Affairs
- Branch: National Guard of Ukraine
- Type: Regiment
- Part of: National Guard of Ukraine
- Garrison/HQ: Mykolaiv
- Nickname: Mykolaiv Regiment
- Engagements: Russo-Ukrainian war: Euromaidan; War in Donbas; Battle of Ilovaisk; Battle of the Border; Russian invasion of Ukraine; Battle of Mykolaiv

Commanders
- Current commander: Colonel Vakulenko Serhii Mykolayovych
- Notable commanders: Colonel Kondratyuk Volodymyr Vasyliovych

The 19th Public Order Mykolaiv Regiment is a regiment of the National Guard of Ukraine tasked with law enforcement tasks and the defense of Ukrainian territorial integrity. In the wake of Russo-Ukrainian war, it has seen combat in Donbass as well as in Mykolaiv Oblast. It was established in 1992 as the 7th Separate Battalion on the basis of 130th Separate Special Motorized Militia Battalion. It is headquartered in the City of Mykolaiv.

== History ==
The regiment was established on 18 January 1990 as the 130th Separate Special Motorized Militia Battalion of the Internal Troops of the Soviet Union being transferred to the National Guard of Ukraine on 2 January 1992 becoming the 7th Separate Battalion. On 17 February 1995, the battalion was subordinated to the Ministry of Internal Affairs of Ukraine and was renamed as the Separate Special Motorized Police Battalion and on 17 April 1995, the battalion was reorganized into the 19th Special Motorized Regiment of the Internal Troops of Ukraine, then becoming the 19th Public Order Protection Regiment of the National Guard of Ukraine on 13 March 2014.

During the Euromaidan, the regiment was deployed for security and maintenance of law and order in Kyiv where many person of the regiment including its commander Volodymyr Vasyliovych Kondratyuk were wounded. The regiment participated in the War in Donbass seeing heavy combat in 2014. It took part in the Battle of Ilovaisk during which on 23 August 2014 in the village of Lysyche, Donetsk Oblast, the regiment's troops in coordination with the Border Guard of Ukraine, the regiment destroyed a KamAZ-4350 vehicle with militants and two KamAZ-4350 vehicles carrying weapons and ammunition, accompanied by two APCs from the Russian Federation. Then the two Armored Personnel Carriers along with other vehicles were also destroyed. During the ambush three personnel of the regiment (Smolyar Oleksandr Vasyliovych, Yarysh Oleksandr Volodymyrovych and Oleg Ivanovych Babkevich) were killed and a soldier of the regiment (Oleksiy Leonidovych Petrov) went missing and his body was later identified via DNA analysis. On the other hand, 26 separatists and Russian soldiers were killed and 20 separatist pieces of equipment were destroyed including the KamAZ-4350s and Ural-4320s. The regiment also saw action during the Battle of the Border, on 24 August 2014, the regiment was withdrawing from the city of Amvrosiivka to Mariupol, when it was ambushed near the Russian border in Kopani but most of the column was able to escape the ambush unscathed but two personnel of the regiment (Vyacheslav Hryhorovych Sarazhan and Yuri Mykolayovych Smirnov) were killed in action during the ambush.

On 14 October 2021, on the island of Khortytsia, the 19th Public Order Regiment of the National Guard of Ukraine was awarded the honorary name "Mykolaiv" and a combat flag.

Following the Russian invasion of Ukraine, the regiment took part in the battle of Mykolaiv in 2022.

== Structure ==
- 1st Patrol Battalion
- 2nd Rifle Battalion
- 3rd Rifle Battalion
- Combat and Logistical Support Company
- Orchestra
- Medical Center

== Commanders ==
- Colonel Kondratyuk Volodymyr Vasyliovych (-2014)
- Colonel Oleksandr Valeriyovych Oksenyuk (2016–2019)
- Colonel Vakulenko Serhii Mykolayovych (2021-)

== Sources ==
- "Миколаївські гвардійці забезпечили громадський порядок під час святкування Свята Йордан". ngu.gov.ua/. National Guard of Ukraine. 2018-01-22. Archived from the original on 25 January 2018.
