= Mykolaiv cluster bombing =

Bombing during the Russian invasion of Ukraine

- Part of the battle of Mykolaiv and Mykolaiv strikes (2022–present)
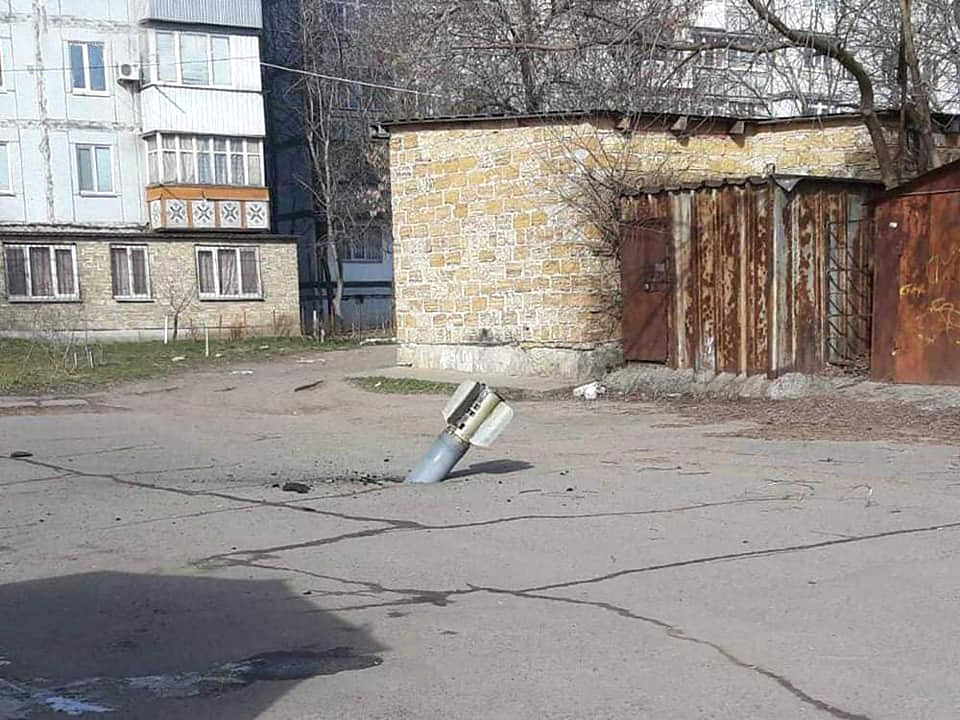
- Unexploded Russian bomb the day after the bombing
- Location: Mykolaiv, Ukraine
- Date: 13 March 2022
- Attack type: Cluster munition bombing
- Deaths: 9
- Perpetrator: Russian Armed Forces

On 13 March 2022, during the Russian invasion of Ukraine, Russian Armed Forces bombed Mykolaiv with cluster munitions, killing nine civilians.

== Victims and damage ==
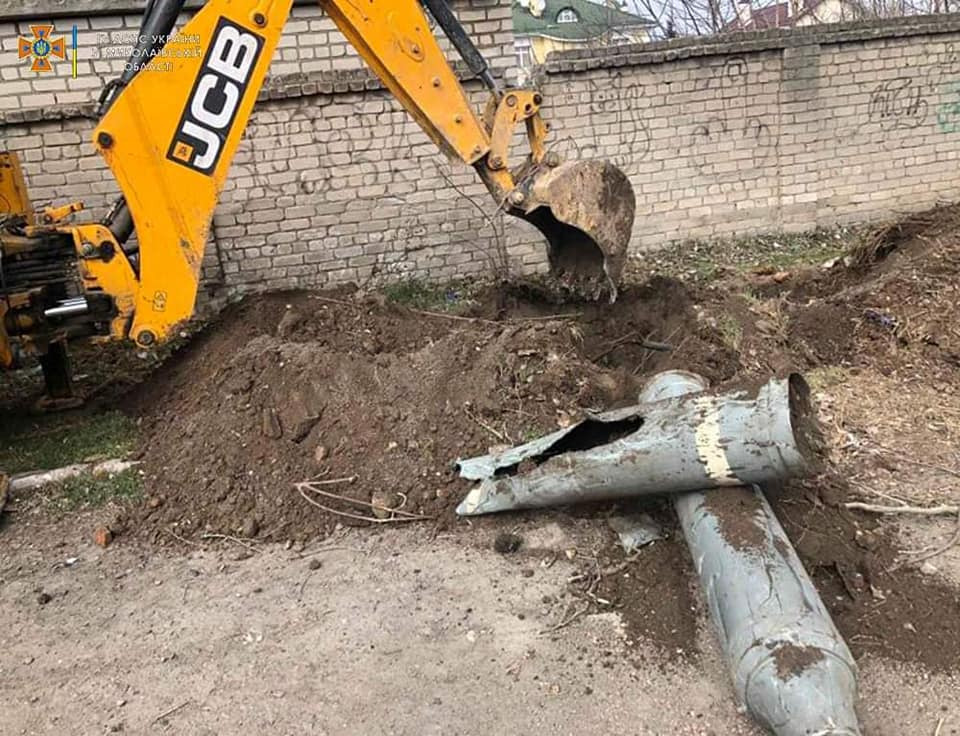
Explosive ordnance disposal in Mykolaiv, 14 March 2022

Nine civilians waiting in line on the street at a cash machine were killed in the attack. The explosions also damaged houses and civilian buildings. Human Rights Watch analysed the incident and found that the Russian forces used Smerch and Uragan cluster munition on densely populated areas.

== War crime analysis ==
Due to the inherently indiscriminate nature of cluster munitions, Human Rights Watch described their use in Mykolaiv as a possible Russian war crime.

== See also ==
- War crimes in the 2022 Russian invasion of Ukraine
- Mariupol hospital airstrike
- Mykolaiv government building airstrike
