= Oleksandr Stadnik =

Ukrainian politician

Oleksandr Stadnik Олександр Стаднік
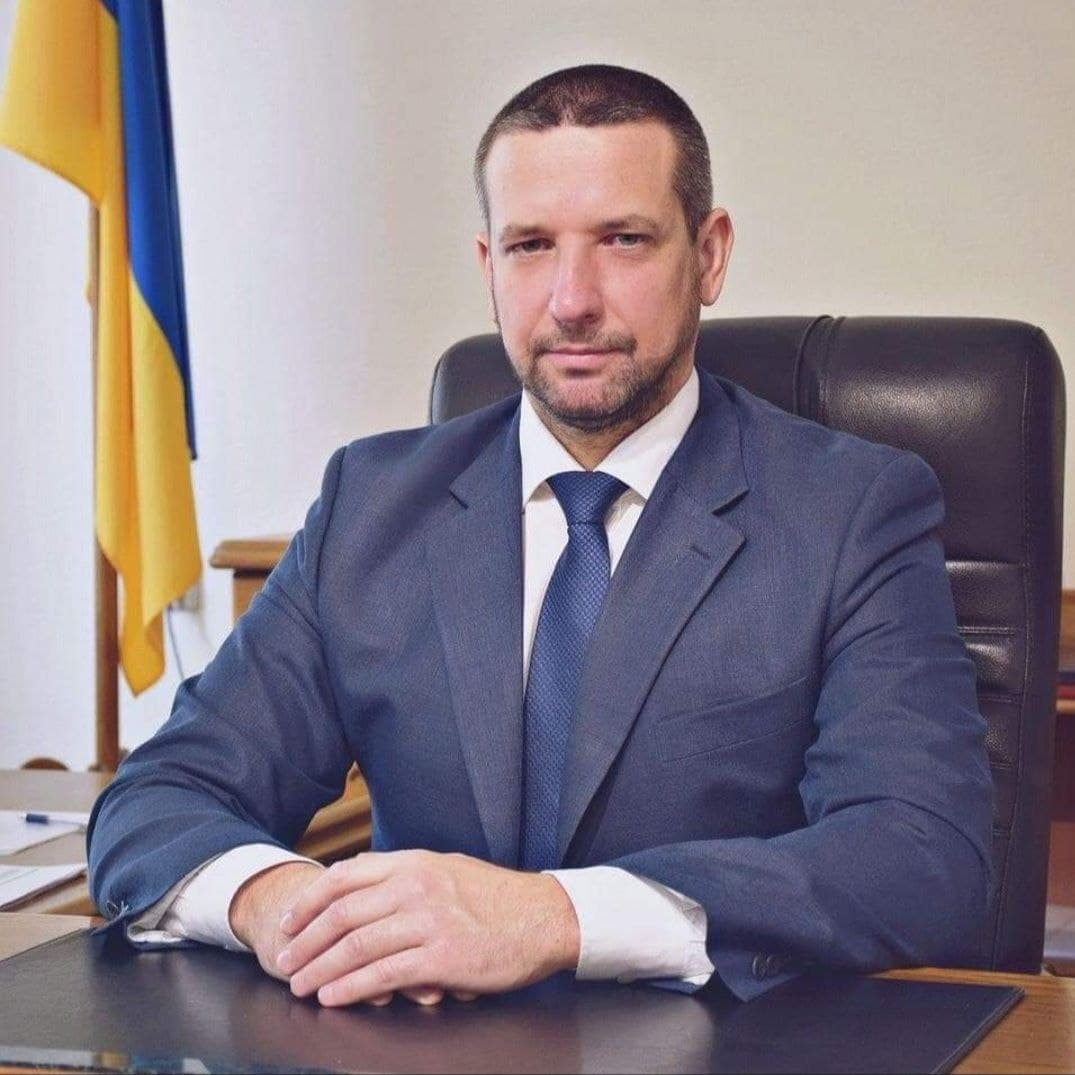

Governor of Mykolaiv Oblast
- In office 18 September 2019 – 17 November 2020
- President: Volodymyr Zelenskyy
- Prime Minister: Oleksiy Honcharuk; Denys Shmygal
- Preceded by: Viacheslav Bon (Acting)
- Succeeded by: Heorhiy Reshetilov (Acting)

Personal details
- Born: Oleksandr Vasylyovych Stadnik; 7 July 1977 (age 49) Smoline, Mala Vyska Raion, Kirovohrad Oblast, Ukrainian SSR
- Party: Independent
- Education: National Academy of Internal Affairs
- Occupation: civil servant politician

Oleksandr Vasylyovych Stadnik (Ukrainian: Олександр Васильович Стаднік; born 7 July 1977) is a Ukrainian civil servant and politician. He was Governor of Mykolaiv Oblast from September 2019 to November 2020.

== Biography ==
In 2006 Stadnik graduated from the National Academy of Internal Affairs.

Stadnik is a lawyer by profession.

He worked at the Ministry of Revenues and Duties.

He also served at the State Fiscal Service in Kyiv.

In 2015, Stadnik ran for the Kyiv City Council.

Stadnik was appointed Governor of Mykolaiv Oblast on 18 September 2019. He was fired from this post on 17 November 2020.
