= Oleksandr Senkevych =

Mayor of Mykolaiv, Ukraine

- Олександр Сєнкевич
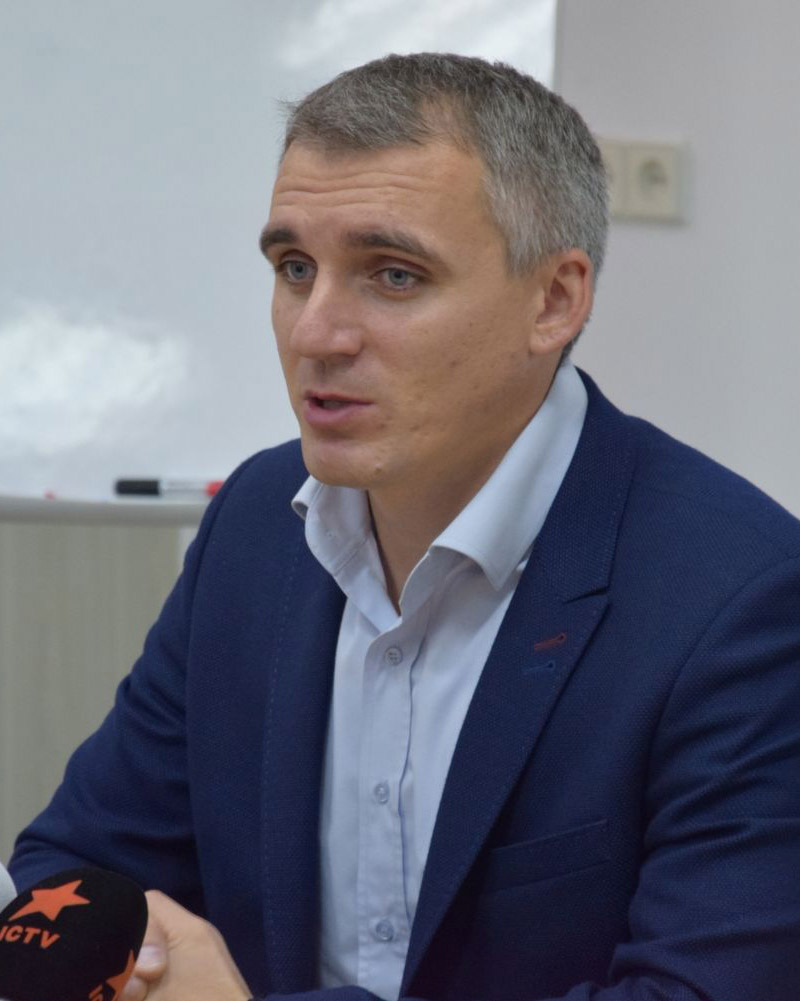
- Senkevych in 2015

Mayor of Mykolaiv
- Incumbent
- Assumed office 24 November 2015
- Preceded by: Yuriy Hranaturov

Personal details
- Born: 4 February 1982 (age 44) Mykolaiv, Ukrainian SSR, Soviet Union

Oleksandr Fedorovych Senkevych (also spelled Sienkevych (Note: Ukrainian official transliteration) or Senkevich; Ukrainian: Олександр Федорович Сєнкевич; born 4 February 1982) is a Ukrainian politician who currently serves as the mayor of Mykolaiv since 2015. During his administration, Russia invaded Ukraine and the city came under attack in the Battle of Mykolaiv. Ukraine successfully defended the city, and since then, the city has been the subject of smaller attacks by Russia. As the city was rebuilt, Senkevych worked on increasing accountability in the city's government.

== Career ==
Senkevych was first elected mayor of Mykolaiv in 2015. Tetiana Kazakova was elected mayor in 2017, and then Senkevych was elected again in 2018.

In February 2022, Russia invaded Ukraine. Senkevych's wife and two children evacuated from Mykolaiv, but he stayed there, saying "I won't leave [the residents] alone here because the captain is the last to leave the ship". Early in March, Russia captured the city of Kherson, and prepared to move to Mykolaiv. Ukrainian troops retreated to Mykolaiv and dug into positions around the city. Senkevych said "the city is ready for war", and also that Ukrainian troops lacked enough supplies. Senkevych and other city officials were prepared to engage in combat themselves; he was equipped with a pistol and had automatic rifles stored in his office. Ukraine successfully defended the city.

After the battle ended, sporadic bombings by Russia continued. Russians stationed in Kherson were able to hit Mykolaiv with illegal cluster munitions, but Ukraine did not have artillery with long enough range to hit Russia back. Senkevych said in June that he had received multiple messages from Russian forces asking him to surrender the city. He "dismissively" responded, "They think the mayor can decide to surrender!” He worked on the city's water problem, after Russia destroyed pipes sending fresh water from the Dnieper River to the city. Starting in April 2022, the city started using water from the Southern Buh river, but he said "it cannot be purified to a drinking level because of the salt content". Senkevych has communicated with the city's residents through the Telegram app.

Mykolaiv's population numbered at 480,000 before the invasion; by July 2023, around 50,000 had fled. The city lost approximately half of its revenue from February 2022 to July 2024. As the city rebuilt, Senkevych worked to increase accountability in the city government, as "transparency issues" were stopping foreign countries from doing business in the city. Mykolaiv became the first city in Ukraine to publish data of international financial aid sent to the city in a machine-readable format. His team, along with foreign supervisors, conducted "integrity assessments" of and introduced corporate-style governance to municipal utilities firms, such as the local water company.

In April 2023, Danish Prime Minister Mette Frederiksen visited Mykolaiv and met Senkevych. The visit and meeting convinced Frederiksen to accept Ukrainian President Volodymyr Zelenskyy's proposal to have Denmark rebuild parts of Ukraine. In July 2023, Senkevych visited Jersey to strengthen ties between Ukraine and the Channel Islands, as well as visit local Ukrainian refugees. Senkevych plans to build places for recreation and modernize schools, as well as build an amusement park in the city's south.

== See also ==
- List of mayors of Mykolaiv
