= Kulbakine Air Base =

Ukrainian Air Force base near Mykolaiv

Kulbakine/Mykolaiv
- Mykolaiv, Mykolaiv Oblast in Ukraine
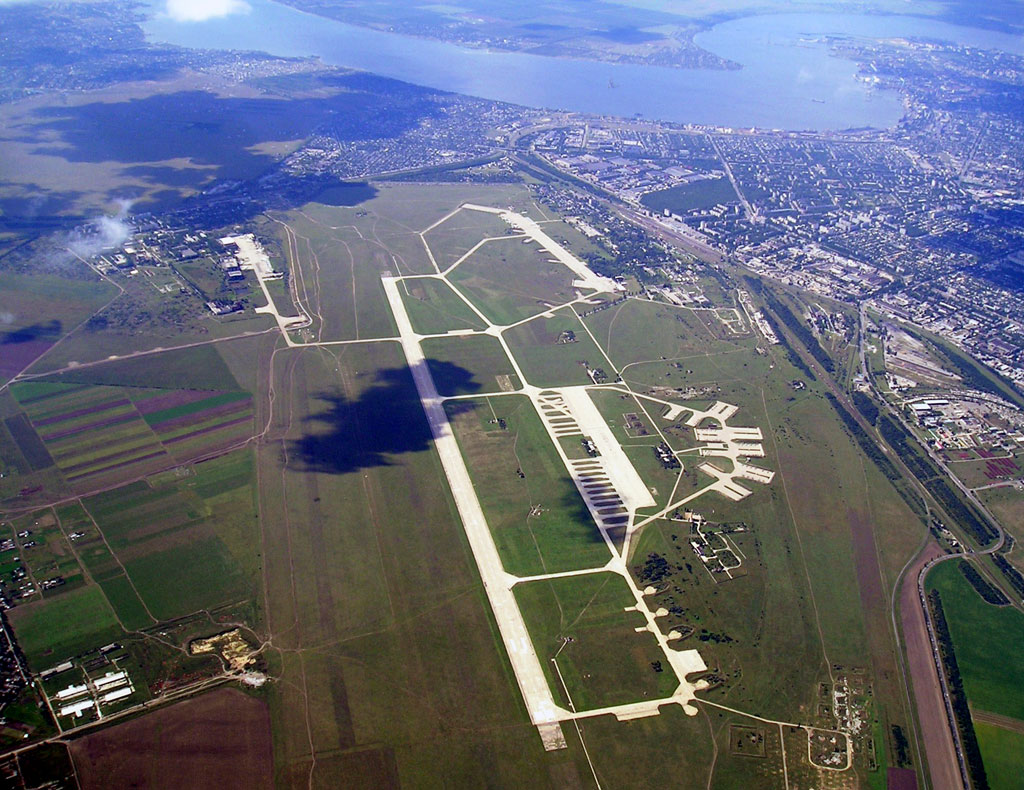

Site information
- Owner: Ministry of Defence
- Operator: Ukrainian Air Force
- Controlled by: Air Command South

Location
- Shown within Mykolaiv Oblast Kulbakine (Ukraine)
- Coordinates: 46°56′31″N 032°05′49″E

Site history
- In use: Unknown - present
- Battles/wars: 2022 Russian invasion of Ukraine

Airfield information
- Identifiers: ICAO: UKOR
- Elevation: 266 metres (873 ft) AMSL
Runways
Direction	Length and surface
05/23	3,221 metres (10,568 ft) Concrete

Kulbakine (ICAO: UKOR) is an air base of the Ukrainian Air Force located near Mykolaiv, Mykolaiv Oblast, Ukraine.

The base is home to the 299th Tactical Aviation Brigade, which flies Sukhoi Su-25, Aero L-39C &M Albatros aircraft.

Kulbakine's runway and fuel and ammunition depots were bombarded by Russian jets at approximately 05:00 on 24 February 2022, as part of the initial Russian strikes on Ukrainian military bases in the early hours of the invasion. The bombing caused a large fire.

On 4 March 2022, Russian forces entered the airbase, but by 17:30, Ukrainian forces had recaptured it, according to Vitalii Kim, governor of Mykolaiv Oblast.
