= Heorhiy Reshetilov =

- Георгій Решетілов
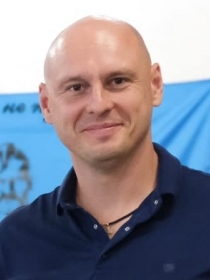
- Reshetilov in August 2024

Governor of Mykolaiv Oblast (acting)
- Incumbent
- Assumed office 16 July 2026
- Preceded by: Vitalii Kim
- In office 17 November 2020 – 25 November 2020
- Preceded by: Oleksandr Stadnik
- Succeeded by: Vitalii Kim

1st Deputy Head of the Mykolaiv Oblast State Administration
- Incumbent
- Assumed office March 2020

Personal details
- Born: Heorhiy Oleksandrovych Reshetilov; 30 June 1982 (age 44) Ukrainian SSR, Soviet Union (now Ukraine)
- Party: Servant of the People

Heorhiy Oleksandrovych Reshetilov (Ukrainian: Георгій Олександрович Решетілов; born on 30 July 1982), is a Ukrainian politician who is currently serving as the acting governor of Mykolaiv Oblast since 16 July 2026, having already served as acting governor in 2020.

He has been the 1st Deputy Head of the Mykolaiv Oblast State Administration since September 2020.

== Biography ==
Reshetilov was born on 30 June 1982.

From 2015 to November 2019, he was the Deputy Head of the Main Territorial Department of Justice for State Registration — Head of the State Registration Department of the Main Territorial Department of Justice in Mykolaiv Oblast.

In November 2019, he was the chief of staff of the Mykolaiv Oblast State Administration.

In 2020, Reshetilov ran unsuccessfully to the Mykolaiv Oblast Council. On 23 September, Reshetilov was appointed 1st Deputy Head of the Mykolaiv Oblast State Administration.

On 17 November 2020, he became the acting Governor of Mykolaiv Oblast. On 25 November, he was replaced by his successor, Vitalii Kim.

On 16 July 2026, after Kim was appointed the Minister of Veterans' Affairs, he became the acting governor for the second time.

== Personal life ==
Reshetilov in his declaration for 2019 indicated by his wife Nataliya and two daughters, Ulyana and Alika. Since 2009, his wife owns an apartment in Mykolaiv with 47.1 square meters. Reshetilov himself also has an apartment, with 32.4 square meters.
