= Serhiy Ryzhkov =

Ukrainian engineer and ecologist (1958–2017)

- Сергій Сергійович Рижков
- Born: 22 June 1958; Mykolaiv, Ukrainian SSR, Soviet Union
- Died: 1 November 2017 (aged 59); Mykolaiv, Ukraine
- Education: Admiral Makarov National University of Shipbuilding (formerly Mykolaiv Shipbuilding Institute)
- Occupations: Engineer; academic; university administrator
- Known for: Rector of Admiral Makarov National University of Shipbuilding; research in ship power plants, ecology and energy saving

Serhiy Serhiyovych Ryzhkov (22 June 1958 – 1 November 2017) was a Ukrainian engineer and ecologist, professor, director of the Scientific-Research Institute of Ecology and Energy Saving, head of the Department of Ecology, and (from 2008) rector of the Admiral Makarov National University of Shipbuilding (NUS).

== Education and academic degrees ==
Ryzhkov graduated with distinction in 1981 from the Machine-Building Faculty of the Mykolaiv Shipbuilding Institute (now NUS). He defended his Candidate of Technical Sciences (Ph.D.-equivalent) thesis in 1985 at the Odesa Institute of Maritime Fleet (now Odesa National Maritime University). In 1993 he defended his Doctor of Technical Sciences dissertation in the field of ship power plants.

== Career ==
At NUS he headed the Department of Ecology and directed the Scientific-Research Institute of Ecology and Energy Saving before being elected rector on 21 October 2008. He held the academic rank of professor and worked on problems of ecological safety and energy-saving in shipbuilding and marine power engineering.

== Public and political activity ==
Ryzhkov was a member of the Green Party of Ukraine from 2006 and served as a deputy of the Mykolaiv Oblast Council in the fifth and sixth convocations.

== Awards ==
- State Prize of Ukraine in Science and Technology (2011) — for the creation of universal transport ships and units of ocean technology (as part of a team).

== Personal ==
Ryzhkov was a badminton enthusiast and held the sports title of Master of Sports of Ukraine.
