= Natalia Kalmykova =

Ukrainian politician (born 1982)

- Наталія Калмикова
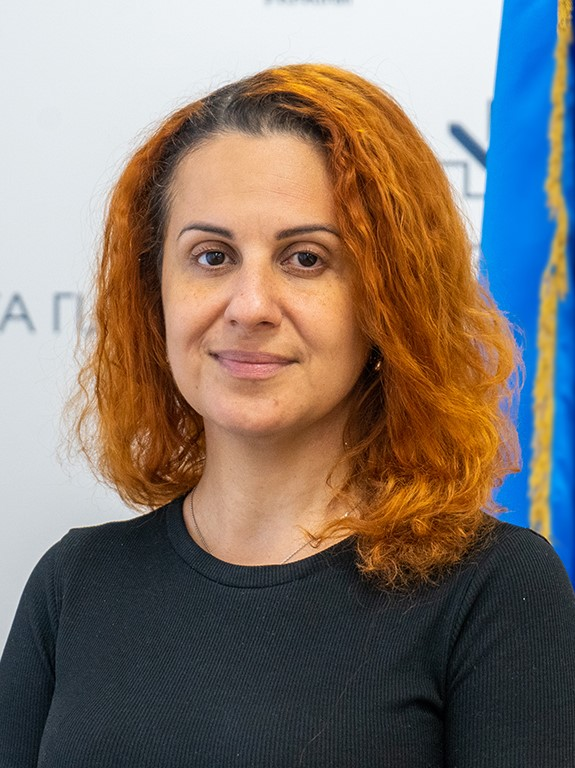
- Kalmykova in 2024

Minister of Veterans Affairs
- In office 5 September 2024 – 16 July 2026
- President: Volodymyr Zelenskyy
- Prime Minister: Denys Shmyhal; Yulia Svyrydenko
- Preceded by: Oleksandr Porkhun (acting)
- Succeeded by: Vitalii Kim

Personal details
- Born: 4 February 1982 (age 44) Vinnytsia, Vinnytsia Oblast, Ukrainian SSR, Soviet Union
- Party: Independent

Natalia Fernandivna Kalmykova (Ukrainian: Наталія Фернандівна Калмикова; born 4 February 1982) is a Ukrainian politician who served as Minister of Veterans Affairs between 2024 and 2026. From 2023 to 2024, she served as Deputy Minister of Defense. From 2018 to 2021, she served as manager of Come Back Alive.

== Early life ==
Kalmykova was born on 4 February 1982 in Vinnytsia, then part of the Ukrainian SSR. Her father is Cuban and studied in the Soviet Union where he met her mother. From 1999 to 2005, she studied at the National Pirogov Memorial Medical University. In addition to her degree from the medical university, she also studied at MIM-Kyiv Business School and was a Fulbright scholar at the University at Buffalo. During her time in the United States she also engaged in research at Syracuse University on female leadership in militaries. She returned briefly to study starting in 2019 at the Vinnytsia Academy of Continuing Education, where she was awarded a Master of Public Administration.

From 2005 to 2012, she worked as an intern at the Vinnytsia City Emergency Hospital. In addition, from 2007 to 2008 she worked as a part-time medical consultant for Alcon Pharmaceuticals and from 2008 to 2012 she was a marketing consultant for Delta Medical. She returned to Delta Medical from 2014 to 2017.

== Career ==
In 2021, she became gender adviser to the Commander of the Ground Forces, Oleksandr Syrskyi. In February 2022, she started serving as head of the Ukrainian Veterans Fund.

From 2023 to 2024 she served as Deputy Minister of Defense. She stated that as deputy minister, she helped create a simplified procedure for writing off military medical property, which helped provide the army with first-aid kits.
