= Mayor of Mykolaiv =

The following is a list of mayors of the city of Mykolaiv, Ukraine. It includes positions equivalent to mayor, such as chairperson of the city council executive committee.

== Mayors ==
- Alexei Nikolaevich Sokovnin, 1901-1904
- Mykola Pavlovych Leontovych, 1909-1917
- Alexander Yosypovich Zymak, 1918
- David Markovich Kokizov, 1918
- Evgeniy Nikolaevich Shtemberov, 1929–1930
- Viktor Yakovlevich Konotop, 1930-1932
- Yuli Yulievich Vishnevsky, 1932-1933
- Yakov Lvovich Zhurovsky, 1933
- S. F. Samoilenko, 1933-1936
- Ivan Dmitrievich Makarov, 1936-1937
- Ivan Kuzmich Karasev, 1937-1939
- Efrem Mikhailovich Morgunovsky, 1939-1941
- Alexander Nikolaevich Khromov, 1944-1946
- Georgy Antonovich Mikhailov, 1946-1949
- Pyotr Ivanovich Gurov, 1949-1952
- Grigory Tikhonovich Sirchenko, 1952-1957
- Mikhail Nikolaevich Stefan, 1957-1960
- Konstantin Ionovich Karanda, 1960-1961
- Nikifor Anisimovich Parsyak, 1961-1964
- Grigory Petrovich Yani, 1964-1966
- Mykola Grigorovich Bryukhanov, 1966-1974
- Ivan Maksimovich Kanaev, 1974-1982
- Alexander Fomich Molchanov, 1982-1990
- Nikolay Yakovlevich Shmygovsky, 1990-1991

=== Ukraine ===
- Yuriy Sandyuk, 1991-1994
- Olkesandr Berdnikov, 1994-1998
- Anatoliy Oleyiynik, 1998-2000
- Mykola Balakirev, 2000
- Volodymyr Chaika, 2000—2013
- Volodymyr Korenyugin, 2013
- Yuriy Hranaturov, 2013—2015
- Oleksandr Senkevych, 2015–2017, 2018
- Tatiyana Kazakova, 2017— 2018
- Oleksandr Senkevych 2018-

== See also ==
- Mykolaiv history
- History of Mykolaiv (in Ukrainian)
- Mykolayiv City Council (in Ukrainian)
