= Mykolaiv government building missile strike =

- Part of the battle of Mykolaiv during the Russian invasion of Ukraine
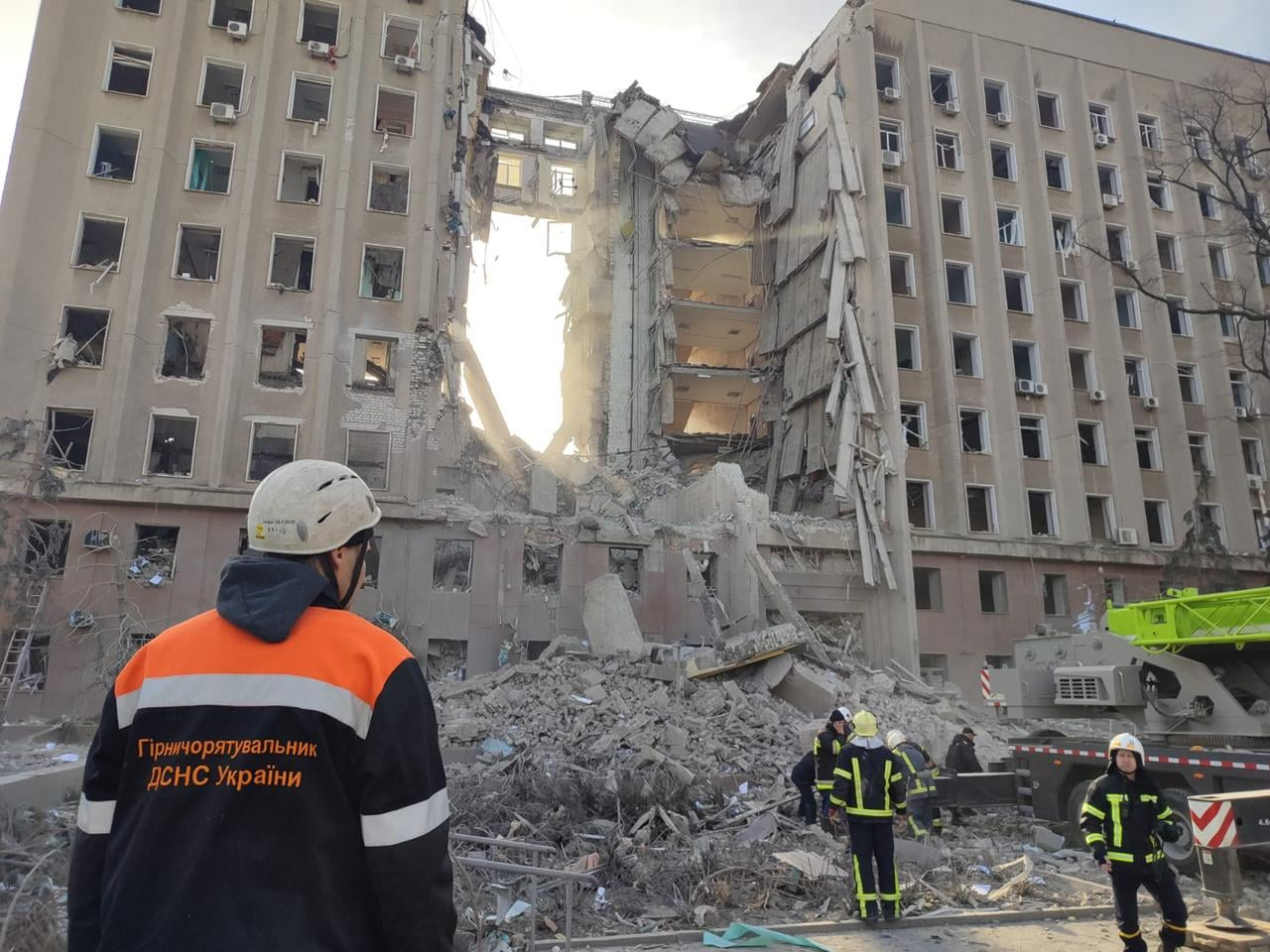
- Demolition from the 9th to the 1st floor of the central section of the 9-storey Administrative buildings, which housed Regional State Administration and Regional Council
- The epicenter of the explosion, which fell on the central part of the regional government building
- Location: 46.97487°N 31.99763°E; Mykolaiv, Ukraine
- Date: 29 March 2022; ~08:45 UTC+3)
- Attack type: Missile strike
- Weapon: Cruise missile
- Deaths: 37
- Injuries: 34
- Perpetrator: Russian Navy

On 29 March 2022, Russian forces carried out a missile strike (supposedly using Kalibr missile) on the Mykolaiv Regional State Administration's headquarters during the battle of Mykolaiv. It resulted in at least 37 deaths and 34 injuries.

== Missile strike ==
The missile strike left half of the building destroyed, leaving a massive hole inside the building's structure and triggering numerous fires. The governor's office was destroyed.

As a result of the attack, 37 people were killed and 34 were injured.

Governor of Mykolaiv Oblast Vitaliy Kim overslept that night, preventing him from going to work and saving his life. Initially, the governor said that eight people were still trapped under the rubble and three soldiers remained missing.

Ukrainian President Volodymyr Zelenskyy confirmed reports about the missile strike shortly later in a video to the Danish Folketing.

== Videos ==
Video of the missile strike

Elimination of consequences on the day of the impact

== Victims ==
Military personnel of the TrO:

1. Vladyslav Ihorovych Lyutov
2. Volodymyr Serhiyovych Motelchuk
3. Dmytro Olehovych Oliynyk
4. Kostyantyn Viktorovych Opliata
5. Dmytro Volodymyrovych Ostryanin
6. Petro Stepanovych Pavlyuk
7. Anton Dmytrovych Salnis
8. Andriy Vasyliovych Stepasyuk
9. Serhiy Viktorovych Farafonov
10. Serhiy Yevheniyovych Shamonin

Personnel of the State Special Communications:

1. Dmytro Ivanovych Kondratenko
2. Andrii Volodymyrovych Chernyavskyi

Military personnel of the 19th regiment of public order protection (Ukraine):

1. Vladyslav Oleksandrovych Arkushenko
2. Kyrylo Vasyliovych Oberemenko
3. Volodymyr Volodymyrovych Tokariev
4. Maxym Volodymyrovych Fedorov

Employees of the commercial court of the Mykolaiv region:

1. Anastasia Olehivna Dolhova
2. Nadia Oleksandrivna Ahafonova

ODA employees:

1. Maria Yosypivna Bincheva
2. Anzhelika Myroslavivna Buchkovska
3. Oksana Viktorivna Havrysh
4. Iryna Serhiivna Hryhorenko
5. Tetyana Anatolyivna Demennikova
6. Olha Hryhorivna Zablotska
7. Zulfiya Mukaddasivna Kapusta
8. Iryna Volodymyrivna Kochetova
9. Natalya Volodymyrivna Lavrinenko
10. Valeriya Oleksandrivna Lysik
1. Andrii Ivanovych Litvinov
2. Svitlana Mykolaivna Popova
3. Artem Olehovych Solonar
4. Olena Mykhailivna Turbina–Khlopina
5. Stanislav Vyacheslavovych Khaitov
6. Mykola Oleksandrovych Khomrovyi
7. Vitaliy Volodymyrovych Shamrayev

KP employees:

1. Oleksandr Oleksandrovych Boyko
2. Andrii Yevheniyovych Tyanulin

== See also ==
- Battle of Mykolaiv
- Mykolaiv cluster bombing
