= Governor of Mykolaiv Oblast =

Chief executive of Mykolaiv Oblast, Ukraine

- Seal of Mykolaiv Oblast

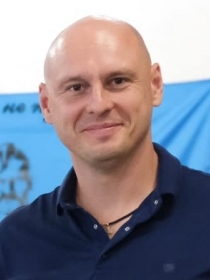
- Incumbent; Heorhiy Reshetilov; Acting since 16 July 2026
- Residence: Mykolaiv
- Term length: Four years
- Inaugural holder: Onyfriy Stolbun; 1937
- Formation: 1937 as Chairman of Executive Committee of Mykolaiv Oblast
- Website: Government of Mykolaiv Oblast

The governor of Mykolaiv Oblast is the head of executive branch for the Mykolaiv Oblast.

The office of governor is an appointed position, with officeholders being appointed by the president of Ukraine, on recommendation from the prime minister of Ukraine, to serve a four-year term.

The official residence for the governor is located in Mykolaiv. The governor is Heorhiy Reshetilov, who assumed office on 16 July 2026 in an acting capacity.

== Governors ==
=== Chairman of Executive Committee of Mykolaiv Oblast ===
- Onyfriy Stolbun (1937–1938)
- Ivan Filippov (1938–1941)
- Nazi German occupational administration (1941–1943)
- Ivan Filippov (1943–1944)
- Panteleymon Borisov (1944–1947)
- Stepan Tereshchenko (1947–1949)
- Mykhailo Syvolap (1949–1953)
- Ivan Nazarenko (1953–1961)
- Vasyl Vednikov (1961–1964) (Note: For Agriculture January 1963 – December 1964)
- Volodymyr Andrianov (1963–1964) (Note: For Industry)
- Tymofiy Barylnyk (1964–1967)
- Mykola Kulish (1967–1975)
- Fedir Zayvy (1975–1982)
- Viktor Ilyin (1982–1989)
- Ivan Grytsay (1989–1990)
- Mykhailo Bashkirov (1990)
- Ivan Grytsay (1990–1992)

=== Representative of the President ===
- Anatoliy Kinakh (1992–1994)

=== Chairman of the Executive Committee ===
- Anatoliy Kinakh (1994–1995)

=== Heads of the Administration ===
- Mykola Kruhlov (1995–1997) (Note: Acting to August 8, 1996)
- Mykola Kruhlov (1997–1999)
- Oleksii Harkusha (1999–2005)
- Oleksandr Sadykov (2005–2007)
- Oleksii Harkusha (2007–2010) (Note: Acting to October 16, 2007)
- Mykola Kruhlov (2010–2014)
- Hennady Nikolenko (2014) (Note: Acting to January 20, 2014)
- Mykola Romanchuk (2014)
- Vadym Merikov (2014–2016)
- Oleksiy Savchenko (2016–2019)
- Viacheslav Bon (2019) (acting)
- Oleksandr Stadnik (2019–2020)
- Heorhiy Reshetilov (2020) (acting)
- Vitaliy Kim (2020–2026)
- Heorhiy Reshetilov (2026–present) (acting)

== Sources ==
- World Statesmen.org
