= Education for Democracy Foundation =

Polish foundation

Education for Democracy Foundation (Fundacja Edukacja dla Demokracji) is a Polish foundation, launched in 1989, which operates as a public benefit organization.

== History ==
The foundation was created in 1989 on the initiative of Polish and American teachers, among other the American Federation of Teachers in Poland. Its founders include Andrzej Janowski, Wiktor Kulerski, Janusz Onyszkiewicz, Edward Wieczorek, Jacek Woźniakowski, Jan Piotr Lasota-Hirszowicz, Sandra Feldman, Herbert Magidson, Diana Ravitch and Albert Shanker.

For its activities, it has thus far received the Democracy and Civil Society Award in 1988, the title of the Pro Publico Bono Institution in 2004, the title of the Non-governmental Organization of Central and Eastern Europe of the year 2009, and the medal of the Polish Humanitarian Organisation in 2010.

The foundation is a founding member of the Grupa Zagranica Alliance of Associations and of the Education for Democracy International Network EDIT.net. Since January 2012, it has been a participant in the Student Council as a Civic Activity Experience at School project. It cooperates with, among other organizations, the Polish-American Freedom Foundation and the Moscow School of Civic Education.

== Activities ==
The foundation’s activities are centered on three main areas:

- Socialization and democratization of schools;
- Civic duty and activism;
- Global solidarity.

Current activities and programs:

- Region in Transition – RITA – a program of the Polish-American Freedom Foundation, which aims to support democratic and free-market transformations in the countries of East-Central Europe, the Caucasus and Central Asia, by sharing the Polish experience;
- Global Education - a part of this program is a regranting competition that provides funding to Polish non-governmental organizations that work within the fields of global education and developmental education;
- Szkoła.pl – Support Program for Supplemental Schools – program aimed at Polish language supplemental schools located outside of Poland;
- Civic Education Abroad – this program’s projects have been executed in countries like Armenia, Azerbaijan, Belarus, Georgia, Moldova, Russia, Tajikistan, Tunisia and Uzbekistan;
- Building potential and the promotion of student councils in Poland – a project, which aims to improve the functioning of student council groups in select schools in the Lublin, Masovian, Podlaskie and Świętokrzyskie voivodeships.
- Locally active minorities – a project targeting the Belarusian, Czech, Lithuanian, German, Slovakian and Ukrainian minorities in order to increase their members’ civic activism in the local, public sphere;
- The Michael Willmann Trail of the Sacred Baroque Art – a project executed with the University of Wrocław and the Angelus Silesius Meeting House, which aims to motivate local populations to act, bring attention and facilitate access to sacred monuments from the Baroque period found in Silesia;
- Civicportal.org - internet platform that promotes international cooperation and supports civil society in Eastern Europe and Central Asia;

== Governing Bodies ==
Supervisory Council

- Małgorzata Naimska – Head of the Council
- Bogumiła Berdychowska-Szostakowska
- Andrzej Dakowski
- Marek Frąckowiak
- Maciej Kozyra
- Tomasz Maracewicz
- Janusz Onyszkiewicz
- Jerzy Wiśniewski
- Jan Jakub Wygnański

Foundation Board

- Martyna Bogaczyk – President
- Jacek Podolski – Vice President
- Natalia Kertyczak - Member
- Agnieszka Świeczka - Member
