= Admiral Makarov National University of Shipbuilding =

Public university in Mykolaiv, Ukraine

- Національний університет кораблебудування ім. адмірала Макарова
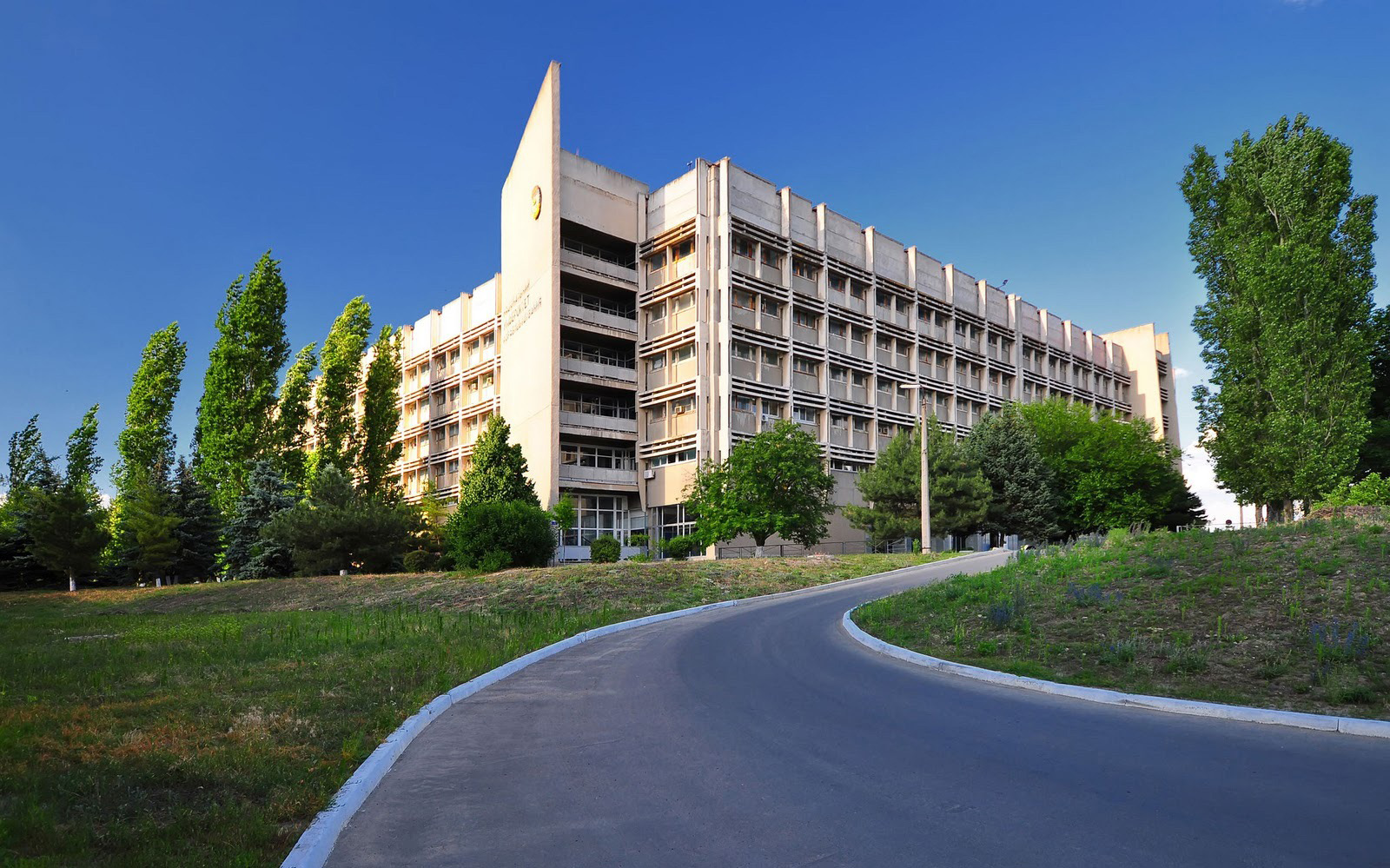
- Main building
- Former names: Mykolaiv Shipbuilding Technical School; Mykolaiv Machine-Building Institute; Mykolaiv Shipbuilding Institute
- Established: 16 July 1920
- Affiliations: Ministry of Education and Science of Ukraine
- Academic affiliations: ORCID
- Rector: Eugeny Trushliakov
- Administrative staff: 136
- Students: 12000
- Location: Mykolaiv, Ukraine; 46.987908°N 32.002316°E
- Website: nuos-international.com.ua

The Admiral Makarov National University of Shipbuilding, abbr. NUS, in Mykolaiv is a higher education institution which trains specialists for the shipbuilding and allied industries of Ukraine. The university is named after Russian admiral Stepan Makarov, who was born in the city.

== History ==
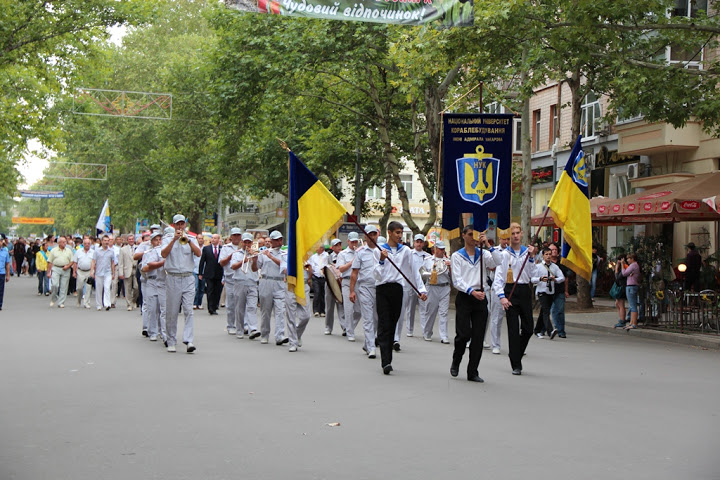
NUS student initiation ceremony.

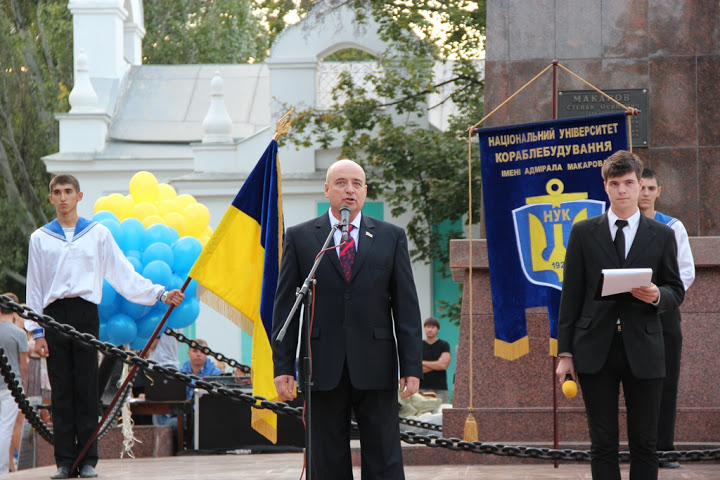
Rector of the NUS Serhiy Ryzhkov at a student initiation ceremony.

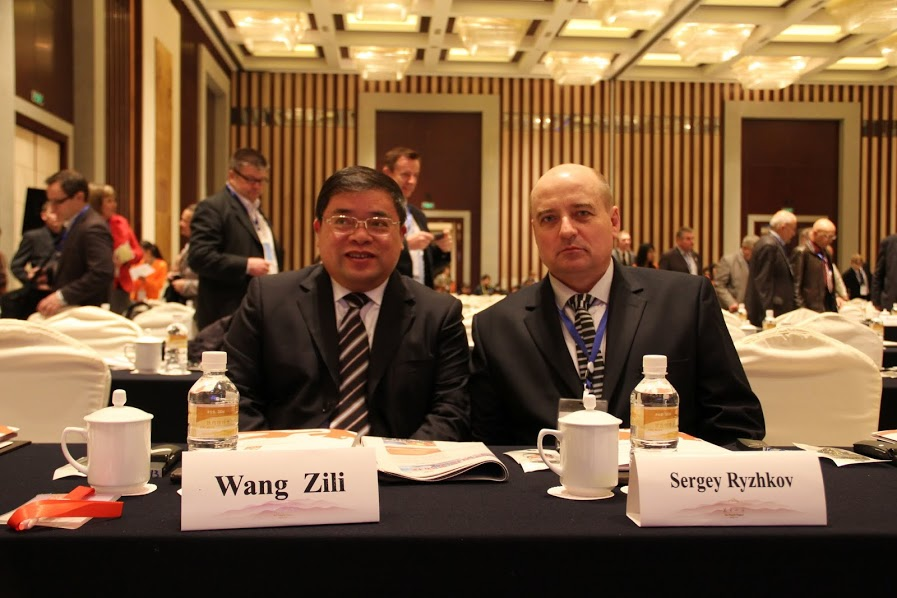
Serhiy Ryzhkov with Wang Zili, president of China's Jiangsu University of Science and Technology.

In April 1901, the Ministry of National Education of the Russian Empire announced the Mykolaiv Industrial Technical School. The school opened on 1 July 1902 at 3 Kuznechnaia Street (now 5 Kovalska Street) marking the beginnings of the NUS. Teaching began on 18 September 1902 with courses including shipbuilding, mechanics, electrics and road building that was carried out in a department of works and in the school itself. The school had the status of a higher education institution: after three years of study, graduating students received the qualification of engineer.

In 1926 and 1927, the school was reorganised to teach technical shipbuilding and the course of study was lengthened to four years. The school was equipped with laboratories for metallurgy, chemistry, thermodynamics and engineering. In 1929 the Mykolaiv Shipbuilding Technical School was merged with the Mykolaiv Technical Night School and renamed the Mykolaiv Machine-Building Institute and in 1930, in association with the ship building department of the Odessa Polytechnic Institute, it was renamed the Mykolaiv Shipbuilding Institute (MSI).

In 1941, at the Soviet Union's entry into World War II, the MSI employed 94 teachers and was training almost 700 students. Approximately 500 students, teachers and employees were conscripted to the Red Army and sent to the front. Others were tasked with building defensive structures and harvesting crops. The MSI was evacuated, first to Stalingrad, then to Astrakhan and later to Przhevalsk, Kirghiz Soviet Socialist Republic. During the war, the MSI maintained 22 departments and trained 370 students. On 30 June 1944, it was decided to return the MSI to Mykolaiv and on 1 October 1944, it reopened. In 1945, 36.5 million khrb was allocated to a five-year plan of restoration and development.

In 1946, the MSI was accredited for postgraduate study in marine engineering and steam and internal combustion engine design. Links were made with other institutes of science. In 1949, the MSI was renamed Admiral Makarov MSI for Stepan Makarov, a native of Mykolaiv, a naval admiral, and a marine engineer. By 1955, over eighty percent of the teachers at the Admiral Marakov MSI were involved in research.

18 September 1970 marked the 50th anniversary of the school and by decree of the Presidium of the Supreme Soviet of the USSR, the school was awarded the Order of the Red Banner of Labour for merit in preparation of engineering workers and for its achievements in the development of scientists. On 17 May 1971, a new building was opened and work was begun on the construction of a thirteen-story hostel that would house 1295 students. In 1971, 50 economists of engineering graduated.

In 1994, by the decision of the Cabinet of Ministers of Ukraine, the Admiral Makarov National Shipbuilding University received the highest level of accreditation, (level four), which gave it the status of a university and it adopted the new name, Ukrainian State Maritime Technical University.

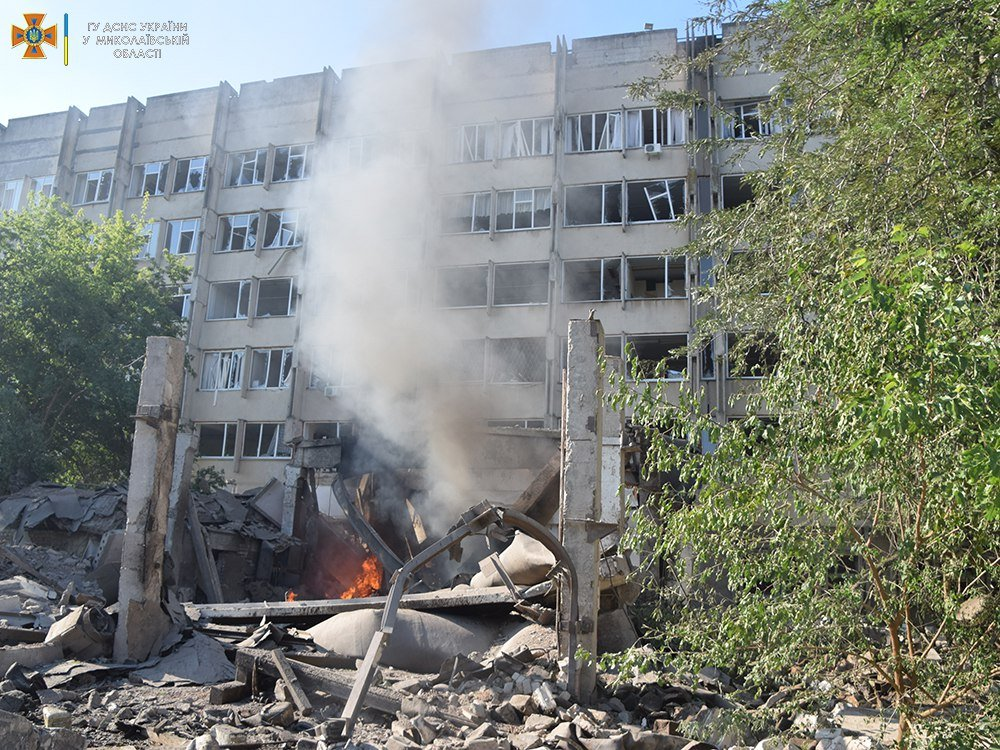
The university after Russian rocket strike on 15 July 2022

On 15 July and 10 October 2022, the building of the university was partially ruined by Russian missile attacks during the Battle of Mykolaiv.

== Progress ==
Since 1941, the MSI has trained over 1700 marine engineers and altogether, 55,000 industry ready workers. The NUS has 8 institutes, 3 faculties, a school at sea, a campus in Kherson and representation in three cities of Ukraine. It has links with its community and with industry. A student population of 12,000 read in twenty-six areas and in thirty specialties. The university offers bachelor, expert and master's degrees; a doctorate of science; and academic and teacher education. The university employs 68 doctorate staff and 256 scientists specialising in new ship design, safety at sea, unmanned underwater craft, structures and works (such as welding), marine metallurgy and marine power (such as low pollution alternative energy sources for the marine industry). The university also provides certification of polymetric systems for metrological maintenance of onboard and coastal complexes; improvements of marine electric equipment and automatic systems, and methods and means of increasing the efficiency of touch maintenance and information complexes of hierarchically organised control systems.

The Ukraine ministerial committee on industrial policy and education (USSTU), recognized the university as a key provider of marine welders. In association with the German organization, the NUS prepared 20 marine welders with qualifications matching European standards.

On 25 March 2004, President of Ukraine Leonid Kuchma gave the university a national status and it was renamed the Admiral Makarov National University of Shipbuilding. The NUS has associations with educational institutions of other nations, giving students the opportunity to study abroad.

== Educational Scientific Centre of International Cooperation ==
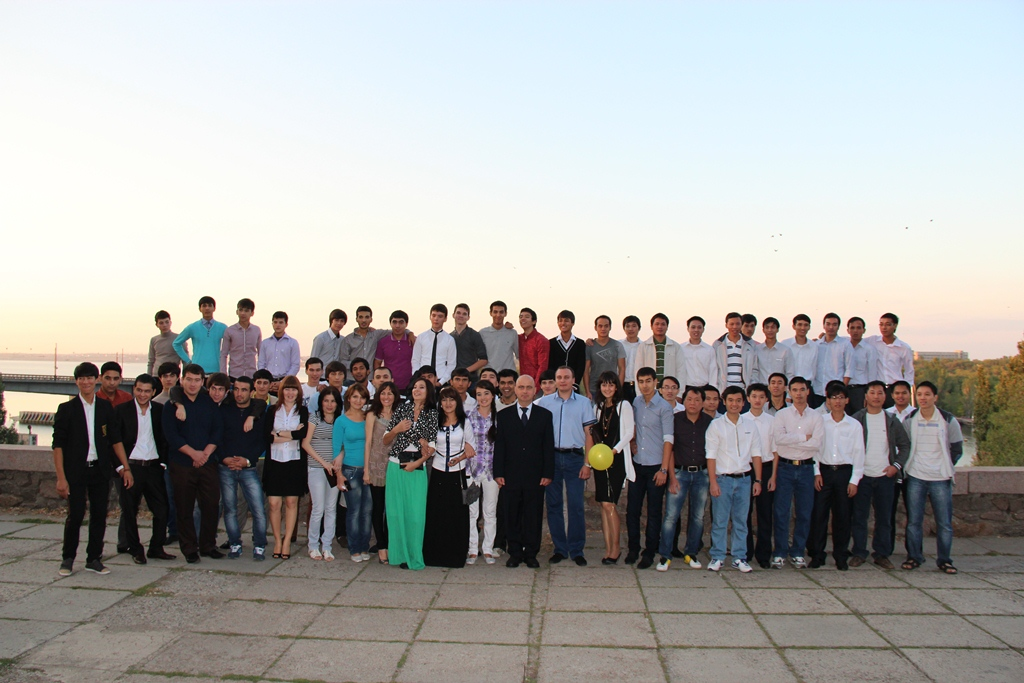
First-year international students of the NUS.

The university's Educational Scientific Centre of International Cooperation (ESCIC) organises the NUS associations with other universities in the United States, the United Kingdom, Germany, Norway, China, Poland, Romania, Turkey, Bulgaria, Iran, Spain, Vietnam and the Commonwealth of Independent States. The ESCIC facilitates requests by NUS students for scholarships, international grants and exchanges. It liaises with, for example, the German Academic Exchange Service, the Alexander von Humboldt Foundation (Alexander von Humboldt-Stiftung, Germany), the Fulbright Program and the International Research & Exchanges Board (IREX) in the US, and the Education for Democracy Foundation (Poland). International students from many nations study on a contractual basis at the NUS.

== Institutes ==
- The Institute of Shipbuilding. Departments are:

Structural mechanics, fluid mechanics, hull construction, maritime technologies, ship theory and design, and shipbuilding technology.

- The Institute of Computer, Engineering and Technological Sciences (faculty of technology). Departments are:

Faculty of technology, welding engineering, design and production of composite materials, material sciences and technology, computer science faculty, automated system software, project management, and, information system and technologies.

- The Institute of Mechanical Engineering. Department (faculty of power engineering). Departments are:

Conditioning and refrigerating, marine and stationary power plants, thermal physics and steam-generating units, turbines, mechanics and ecology, internal combustion engines, ecology, marine mechanical engineering technology and mechanics and mechanical engineering.

- The Institute of Automatic Control and Electrical Engineering. Departments are:

Computer assisted control systems, ship electrical equipment and information security, electrical power systems, automatic control engineering, theoretical electrical engineering and electronic systems, impulse processes and technologies, and, marine instrument engineering.

- The Institute of Humanities. Departments are:

Theory and history of the state and law, law, applied linguistics, social studies and humanities, modern languages, design, Olympic and professional sports theory, and, physical training and sports.

- The Institute of Extramural and Distant Learning, (faculty of mobile technologies). Departments are:

Theoretical mechanics, engineering graphics, life safety and civil defence, natural sciences, higher mathematics, physics, and, philosophy and cultural studies.

== Faculties ==
- Technology;
- Power Engineering;
- Mobile Technologies;
- Engineering and Economics;
- Preparation.

== Branches ==
- Kherson Branch (since 1967)
- Kyiv Educational and Consulting Centre
- Tockmak Educational and Consulting Centre
- Yuzhnoukrainsk Distant Learning Centre
- Kirovohrad Distant Learning Centre
- Pervomaisk Polytechnic
- Feodosia Polytechnic
- Institute of Postgraduate Studies

== Official partners ==
- AMCOS LLC
- Carbon Federation
- Aspirom Group

== Notable alumni ==
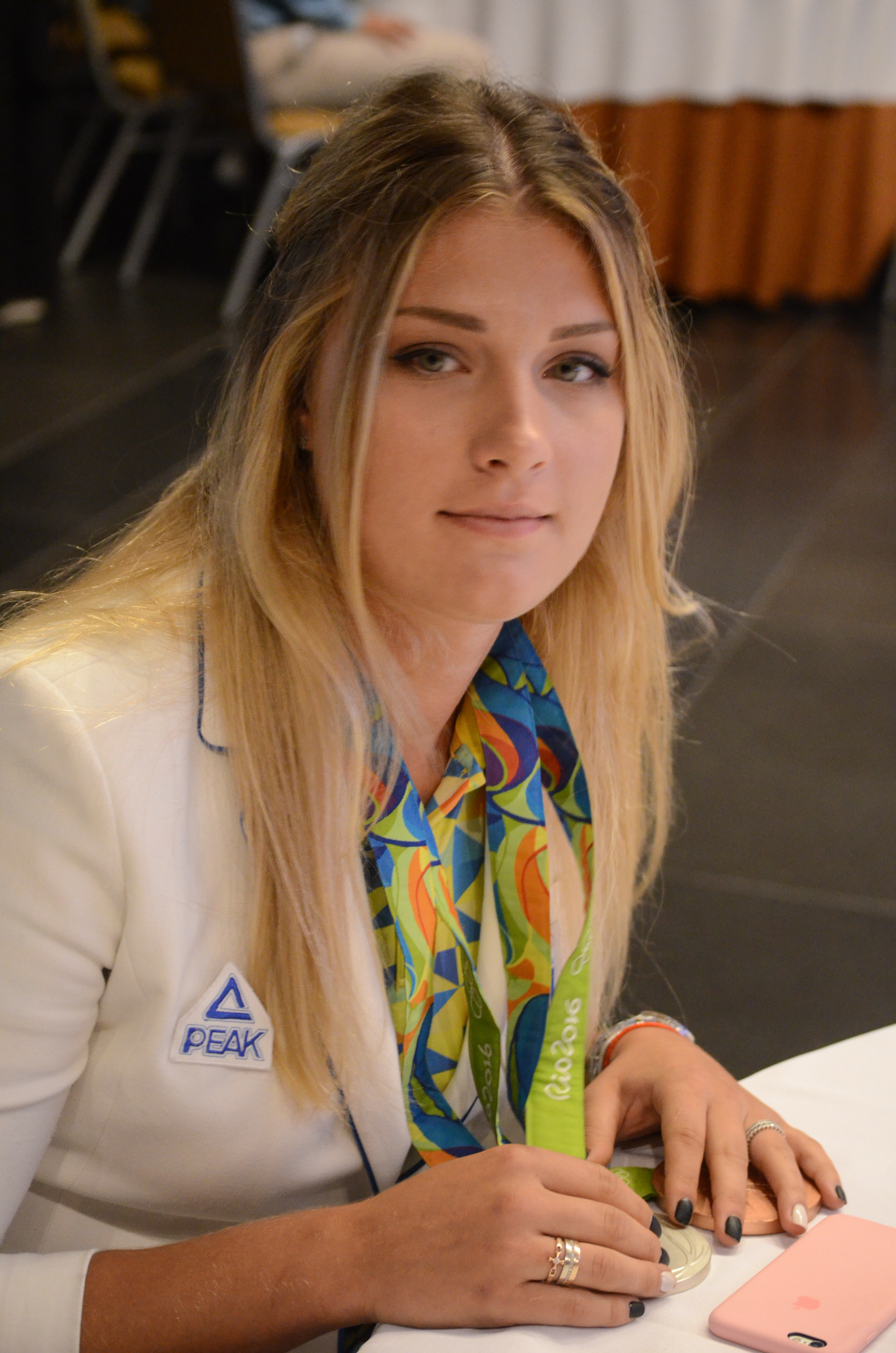
Olha Kharlan, 4-time women's world sabre world champion

- Olga Kharlan, 4-time women's world sabre world champion
- Li Min Peng, chess grandmaster

== See also ==
- Open access in Ukraine
- List of universities in Ukraine
