= Vadym Merikov =

Ukrainian politician (born 1976)

- Вадим Меріков
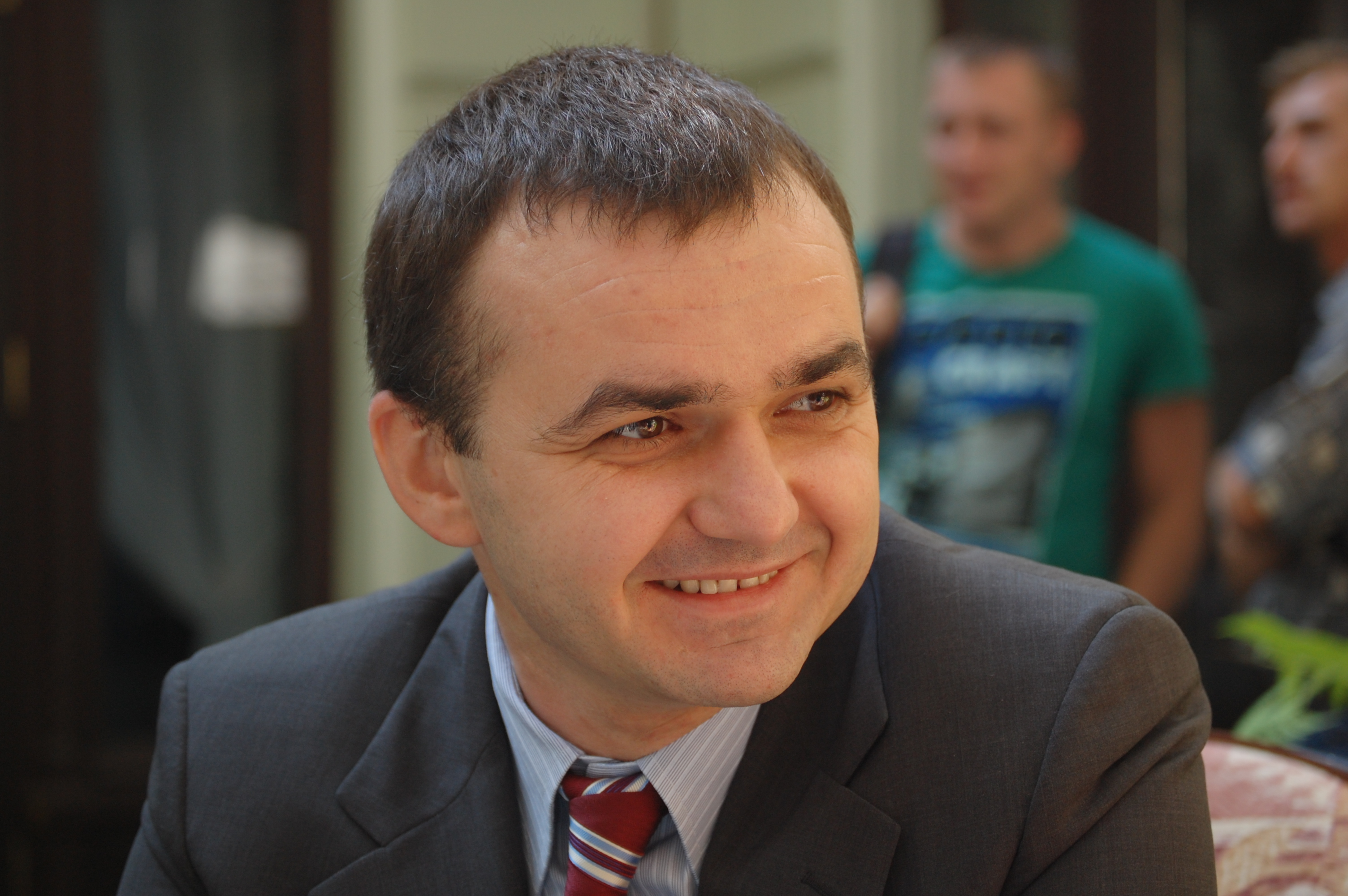
- Merikov in September 2012

Governor of Mykolaiv Oblast
- In office 28 July 2014 – 29 June 2016
- Preceded by: Mykola Romanchuk
- Succeeded by: Oleksiy Savchenko

Member of the Verkhovna Rada
- In office 15 March 2014 – 27 November 2014

Personal details
- Born: Vadym Ivanovych Merikov; 23 February 1976 (age 50) Mishkovo-Pohorilove, Ukraine, Soviet Union
- Party: Batkivshchyna

Vadym Ivanovych Merikov (Ukrainian: Вадим Іванович Меріков; born on 23 February 1976) is a Ukrainian politician. He is a former People's Deputy of Ukraine and served as the governor of the Mykolaiv Oblast from July 28, 2014, to June 29, 2016.

== Biography ==
Vadym Merikov was born in the village of Mishkovo-Pohorilove, on 23 February 1976. In 1993, he graduated from Pogorelov High School, after which he enrolled in the Mykolaiv State Pedagogical Institute at the Faculty of Physical Education and Sports, who graduated in 1997 with a degree in Physical Education. He received the title of Master of Sports of Ukraine in kickboxing, as well as the title of Honored Boxing Coach.

After graduation, he entered Odesa University. He graduated in 2005 with the Faculty of Law, and has received a lawyer qualification.

=== Political activity ===
In 2005, he was elected deputy of the fifth convocation of the Mykolaiv City Council from the "Bloc of Yulia Tymoshenko".

In March 2010, he became the head of the parliamentary group "Front of Change" in the Mykolaiv City Council.

In October 2010, he was elected a deputy of the Mykolaiv Regional Council (the first list of the party "Front of Change").

At the next election in 2012, the Verkhovna Rada of Ukraine headed the electoral headquarters of the United Opposition in Mykolaiv Oblast and was included in the electoral list of Batkivshchyna under No. 66.

June 14, 2013, in connection with the decision to liquidate the Front of Change party, Vadym Merikov joined the party "Batkivshchina". He was elected a member of the political council of the party.

March 15, 2014 Vadym Merikov received the powers of the people's deputy of Ukraine after the Verkhovna Rada (Ukraine's parliament) terminated the powers of the people's deputies Arseniy Yatsenyuk and Stepan Kubiv, who received positions in the Cabinet of Ministers.

He was a member of interparliamentary groups with Switzerland, France, Norway, the United Kingdom, Austria, and the United States.

=== Governor of Mykolaiv Oblast ===
On July 28, 2014, by the decree No. 629 of the President of Ukraine, Vadym Marikov was appointed Governor of Mykolaiv Oblast by Petro Poroshenko.

In mid-August 2014, the media, citing sources in the Security Service of Ukraine, reported the detention of a group of five people who were preparing to assassinate Governor Merikov and his family. According to the siloviki, it is connected with the Donetsk People's Republic, whose interaction with its Mykolaiv like-minded officials previously opposed.

June 15, 2016, Merikov resigned as the Governor of Mykolaiv Oblast. On June 24, 2016, the Cabinet of Ministers of Ukraine accepted the decision.

On June 29, 2016, he was dismissed by President Poroshenko.

In October 2017, Vadym Merikov initiated and supported the third Investment Forum “Mykolaiv Region - a Reliable Partner”.
