= Kopani =

Kopani may refer to the following localities in Ukraine:

- Kopani, Donetsk Raion, Donetsk Oblast, an urban-type settlement also known as Voikovskyi
- Kopani, Pokrovsk Raion, Donetsk Oblast
- Kopani, Kherson Oblast
- Kopani, Orikhiv urban hromada, Polohy Raion, Zaporizhzhia Oblast
- Kopani, Vozdvyzhivka rural hromada, Polohy Raion, Zaporizhzhia Oblast

== See also ==
- Velyki Kopani
