= Promin, Mykolaiv Raion, Mykolaiv Oblast =

Village in Mykolaiv Oblast, Ukraine

Promin Промінь
- Rural settlement
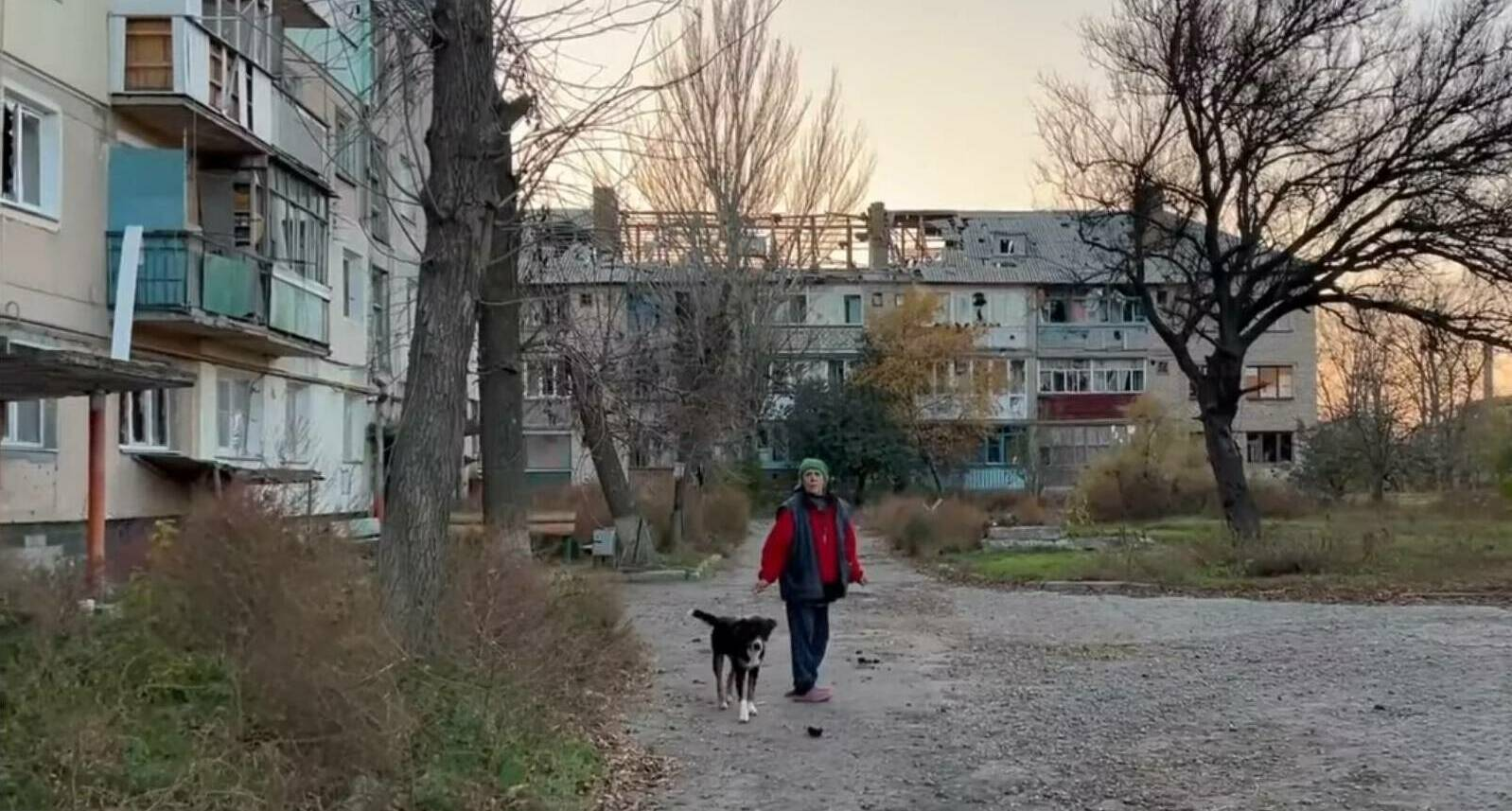
- Luch in 2022, showing damage from Russian shelling during the Invasion of Ukraine

- Location of Promin Promin (Ukraine)
- Coordinates: 46°49′23″N 32°13′02″E
- Country: Ukraine
- Oblast: Mykolaiv Oblast
- Raion: Mykolaiv Raion
- Hromada: Shevchenkove rural hromada

Population (2022)
  - Total: 38
- Postal code: 57263
- Area code: +380 512
- Climate: Cfa

Promin (Ukrainian: Промінь), formerly Luch (Луч), is a rural settlement in Mykolaiv Raion, Mykolaiv Oblast (province) of Ukraine. It belongs to Shevchenkove rural hromada, one of the hromadas of Ukraine.

Until 18 July 2020, Luch was located in Vitovka Raion. The raion was abolished in July 2020 as part of the administrative reform of Ukraine, which reduced the number of raions of Mykolaiv Oblast to four. The area of Vitovka Raion was merged into Mykolaiv Raion.

Luch was seriously damaged in the Russian invasion of Ukraine, and was rendered a ghost town after almost all of the village's 1,000 residents fled.

On 18 June 2025, the Verkhovna Rada renamed the rural settlement to Promin to match Ukrainian language standards.
