= Vitalii Kim =

Ukrainian politician (born 1981)

- Віталій Кім
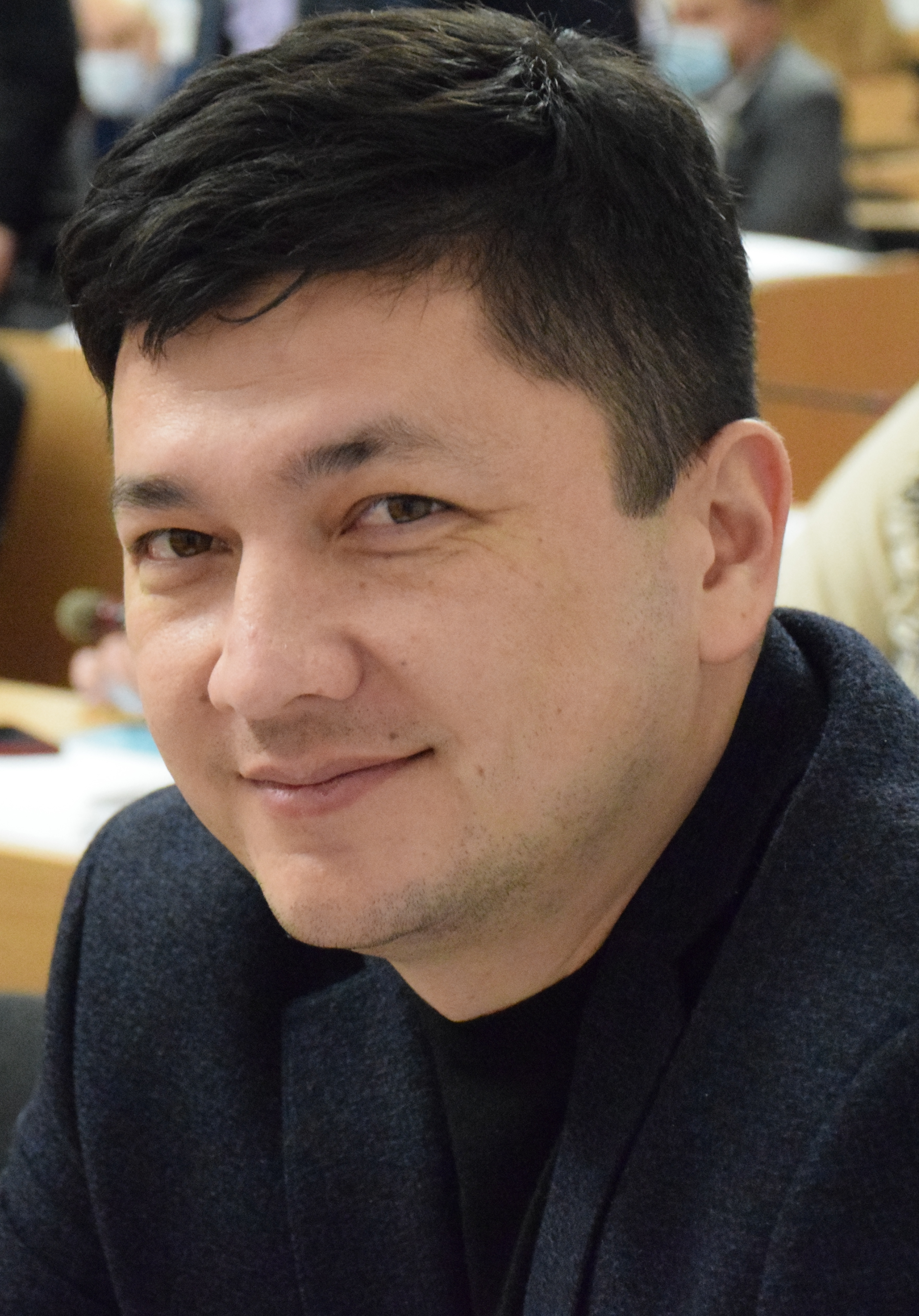
- Kim in 2020

Minister of Veterans' Affairs
- Incumbent
- Assumed office 16 July 2026
- Prime Minister: Serhii Koretskyi
- Preceded by: Nataliya Kalmykova

Governor of Mykolaiv Oblast
- In office 25 November 2020 – 16 July 2026
- Preceded by: Heorhiy Reshetilov (acting)
- Succeeded by: Heorhiy Reshetilov (acting)

Personal details
- Born: 13 March 1981 (age 45) Nikolayev, Ukrainian SSR, Soviet Union (now Mykolaiv, Ukraine)
- Party: Independent
- Spouse: Yulia Vitalivna Kim

Vitalii Oleksandrovych Kim (Ukrainian: Віталій Олександрович Кім; born 13 March 1981) is a Ukrainian businessman and politician who currently serves as Minister of Veterans' Affairs. Between 2020 and 2026 he was the Governor of Mykolaiv Oblast and head of the Mykolaiv Regional Military Administration.

== Biography ==
Vitalii Oleksandrovych Kim was born on 13 March 1981 in Nikolayev, Ukrainian SSR. His father, Oleksandr, is a basketball coach.

Kim graduated from the Mykolaiv Gymnasium No. 2 and the Admiral Makarov National University of Shipbuilding with a degree in enterprise economics.

In 1998, he began to engage in entrepreneurial activity. He was the managing partner of the Ushuaja entertainment complex.

In 2003, he worked for the Ukrpromresurs company, which was engaged in public sector auditing. From 2005 to 2011, he managed a number of enterprises in Mykolaiv and was engaged in international investments. From 2015 to 2016, he headed the analytical department of the Ministry of Agrarian Policy of Ukraine. He is also a founder of a group of development companies, engaged in the construction of residential complexes "Orange", "Concert" and "Uyutny".

=== Political activity ===
In 2019, he was a volunteer of the Mykolaiv branch of the Servant of the People party in the presidential and parliamentary elections. During the local elections of 2020, he was a candidate for deputies of the Mykolaiv city council from Servant of the People under No. 2, while remaining non-partisan. Kim was also the head of the party's election headquarters and campaigned for the city and regional councils.

On 25 November 2020, President of Ukraine Volodymyr Zelenskyy appointed Kim governor of Mykolaiv Oblast.

During the 2022 Russian invasion of Ukraine, Kim as governor of Mykolaiv Oblast faced an ultimately unsuccessful attack from Russian forces. Regarded by Western sources such as The Economist and Le Monde as a charismatic leader, he has held daily video updates of the oblast's situation, which have garnered a following and established him as a popular figure across Ukraine. On 29 March 2022, his office was hit by a Russian missile in an airstrike which killed at least 37 people.

On 16 July 2026 Kim was appointed Minister of Veterans' Affairs of Ukraine as part of the Koretskyi Government.

== Personal life ==
=== Family ===
He is married to Yulia Vitalivna Kim, and is raising three children.

Alongside Ukrainian, Kim speaks Russian and English, in addition to some French and Korean, the latter owing to his Koryo-saram ancestry.
