= Ukrainian Association of Professional Photographers =

Public organisation

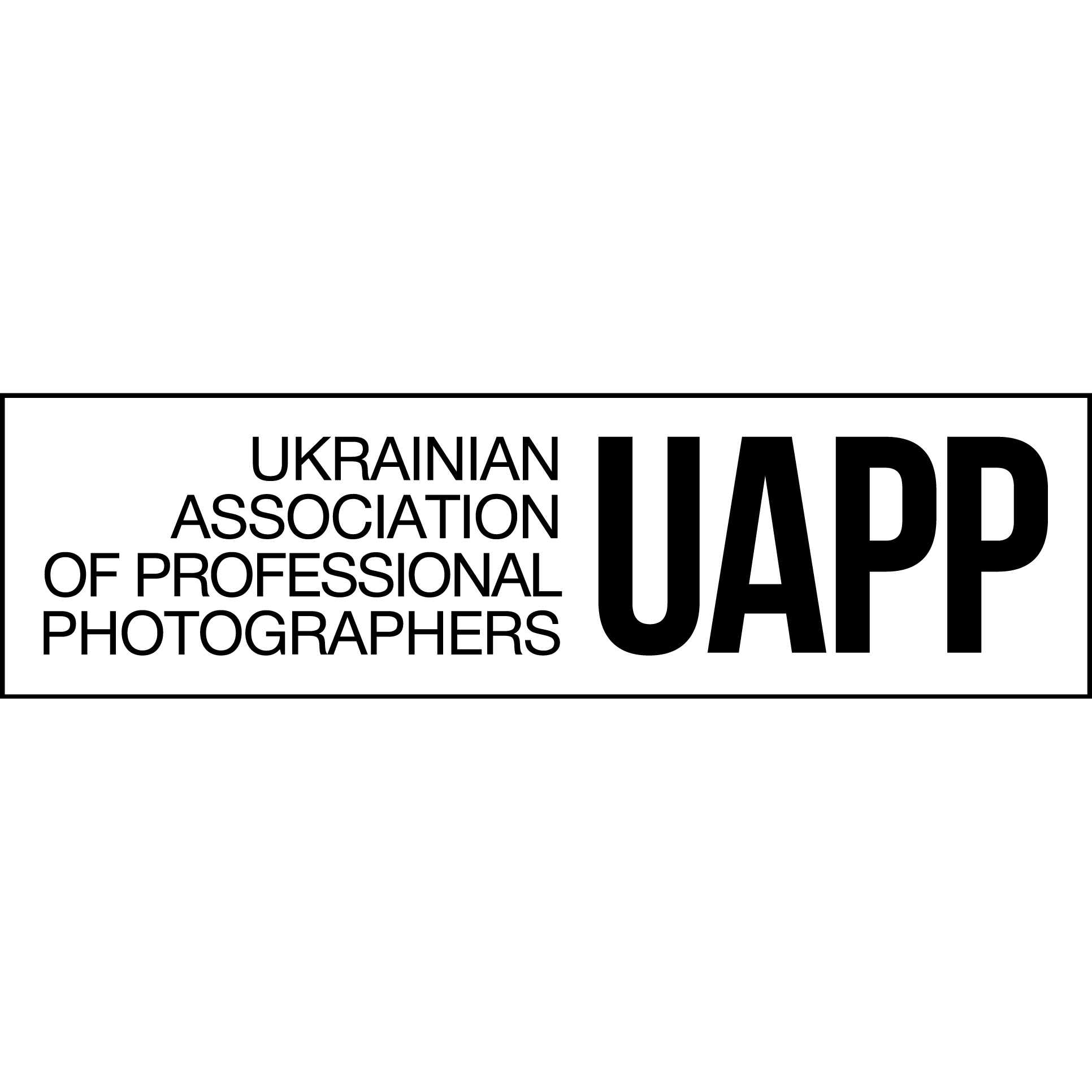
- Founded: 2013
- Founder: Mstyslav Chernov
- Type: public organization
- Purpose: professional photography, education, copyright protection
- Location: Ukraine
- Members: Federation of European Professional Photographers
- Website: www.ukrainianphotographers.com

The Ukrainian Association of Professional Photographers (UAPP, Ukrainian: Українська асоціація професійних фотографів, УАПФ) is a public organization that unites professional Ukrainian photographers. The association was founded in 2013 and implements educational, social, research, and cultural projects, as well as book publishing.

UAPP is the official representative of Ukraine in the Federation of European Professional Photographers.

The association supports photographers during the war through various programs and protects their rights.

The founder and director of the organization is Mstyslav Chernov — a Ukrainian photojournalist, war correspondent for the Associated Press, Oscar, BAFTA and Pulitzer Prize winner, author of numerous documentary projects about the war in Ukraine, and a member of the PEN Ukraine.

According to the official website, UAPP has organized over 250 exhibitions and 5 educational projects, provided 18 grants to Ukrainian photographers, and published 8 books.

== Mission and Goals ==
The Ukrainian Association of Professional Photographers implements educational, social, research, and cultural projects, as well as publishing initiatives.

The association supports Ukrainian photographers through mentorship and microgrant programs focused on developing documentary photography during the war.

UAPP also promotes the certification of Ukrainian professional photographers according to European standards through cooperation with FEP.

The association advocates for the protection of photographers' copyrights and promotes ethical standards in professional activity.

== History ==
The Ukrainian Association of Professional Photographers was founded in 2013 as an independent professional public organization.

The founder and director of the association is photographer Mstyslav Chernov.

In its early years, UAPP focused on organizing exhibitions, cultural events, and creating conditions for international cooperation among photographers.

Since 2016, the organization has been the official representative of Ukraine in the Federation of European Professional Photographers, which enabled Ukrainian photographers to obtain European qualifications and certifications.

=== Activities after 2022 ===
After the start of the full-scale Russian invasion of Ukraine in February 2022, UAPP intensified its activities, focusing on documenting the war and supporting Ukrainian photographers.

The association became a partner of the international initiative FotoEvidence Ukraine, which creates photo books and documents the war.

UAPP launched mentorship and microgrant programs for photographers working in wartime conditions, aimed at supporting and developing documentary photography.

The association also created the online archive "Photo Chronicles of War", which records key events of Russian aggression against Ukraine, preserving them as historical documents for future use.

== Core activities ==
=== Public advocacy for photographers’ rights ===
UAPP actively advocates for the protection of the rights of Ukrainian photographers at the international level. In March 2025, the association publicly condemned the results of the international World Press Photo competition, in which Russian and Belarusian photographers won with projects related to Ukraine. UAPP expressed concern about the ethical standards of the competition and called for adherence to the principles of impartiality and transparency.

=== Education: courses, lectures, trainings ===
UAPP implements educational programs aimed at supporting and developing Ukrainian photographers, promoting photography as a professional activity, and developing Ukrainian culture in general.

In particular, the association organizes mentorship programs and provides microgrants for photographers working on projects related to the war in Ukraine. The program includes online courses, individual consultations with mentors, and financial support for the implementation of documentary projects. In 2024, participants had the opportunity to receive a $1,000 grant to create documentary projects.

UAPP, together with Chekachkov Photo Academy, organized a series of lectures by Mstyslav Chernov titled "Photography as a Tool of Manipulation". These lectures examined the impact of media and imagery on society and politics.

The project "Language of Photography" was implemented in educational and rehabilitation centers in Kharkiv and Kyiv for children with speech and hearing impairments. The classes included lectures on the basics of photography, composition, and provided children with tools for artistic self-expression.

=== "From Country to Ukraine" Festival ===
UAPP became a partner of the cultural and educational festival "From Country to Ukraine", which was held in the eastern regions of Ukraine. As part of the project, lectures and workshops were organized to develop local communities and promote Ukrainian culture.

=== Exhibitions ===
UAPP actively organizes and participates in exhibition projects that highlight events in Ukraine.

=== Media projects and photo books ===
UAPP participates in the creation of media projects and photo books that document events in Ukraine. In 2024, the association, together with the Ukrainian House, presented the photo book “Outbreak. Ukrainian Photography 2022–2023”, which includes works by leading Ukrainian photographers documenting the full-scale Russian invasion of Ukraine. The book is based on photographs shown at the "Outbreak" exhibition in October 2022 and aims to preserve and disseminate eyewitness accounts of the war through the authors' visions.

“How we walk through the fire” This photo book, covering two years of full-scale war in Ukraine, includes 190 documentary images by over 40 Ukrainian photographers.

“Independent. The modern history of Ukraine through the lens of the best documentarians” This edition, dedicated to the 30th anniversary of Ukraine's independence, includes over 140 unique documentary photographs by more than 60 Ukrainian photographers.

“Brave to carry the light” Contains photographs by over 30 Ukrainian authors who, during autumn 2022, winter, and spring 2023, captured the energy crisis caused by Russian military strikes on Ukrainian infrastructure.

“War Photo Chronicles”. An online photo archive, created in collaboration with the ZMIN Foundation, that records how Ukrainians experience the war through documentary photography and advocates for the visibility of the Ukrainian experience among international audiences. The book “Brave to Bring the Light” contains photographs from this project. Over 200 images from the project were presented at the exhibition “They Are Fighting for Us Too” in Houston (USA).

WAR CHRONICLES. UKRAINE 2014–2025. A photobook that brings together visual stories by Ukrainian photographers documenting the war over the past decade — from the Revolution of Dignity to the full-scale Russian invasion. It is the result of the FotoEvidence Ukraine initiative — a program to support Ukrainian photographers and preserve Ukrainian culture, launched by the FotoEvidence association in partnership with UAPP. The photobook was presented at the «Book Arsenal» in 2025.

== International cooperation ==
UAPP is an official member of the Federation of European Professional Photographers (FEP) — an international organization that unites over 50,000 professional photographers from 29 European countries. In cooperation with FEP and through other national associations, the UAPF provides Ukrainian photographers with the opportunity to receive professional, educational, and legal support and confirm their skill through a 3-level qualification system (for photographers and videographers). UAPP members have the exclusive right to obtain EP, QEP, and MQEP qualifications.

The association implements joint projects abroad involving Ukrainian photographers: exhibitions, projects, and books.

== Notable Members or Participants ==
Among UAPP members are prominent Ukrainian documentary photographers:

Taras Bychko — works in documentary and street photography; co-founder of the "Ukrainian Street Photography" community. Laureate of the national "Photographer of the Year" award (2016, in the "Street Photography" and "Still Life" categories), winner of international competitions such as Leica Street Photo, Miami Street Photo Festival, and Documentary Family Awards; his works have been published in The Guardian, National Geographic, Lens Culture, among others.

Andrii Dubchak — founder and director of the information media outlet Frontliner. One of the first live streamers of the Euromaidan events in 2013–2014, later began covering the Russo-Ukrainian War since 2014. His reports have been broadcast on CNN, BBC, The New York Times, and other international media. Laureate of the Lovie Award (2014), Free Media Award (2022), LifePressPhoto Gold Medal (2020), and the Ukrainian Order of Merit, 3rd class (2022).

Yurko Dyachyshyn — documentary and street photographer. Known for long-term projects, particularly the "Slavik’s Fashion" series (2011–2013), which gained widespread popularity in the media and fashion circles due to the stylized image of a homeless man named "Slavik" in Lviv. Other notable works: “Carpathian Shepherds” (2006–2019), “Horses” (2009–2021), “Terra Galicia” (2017–2020). His photos have been exhibited in solo shows in Ukraine, Poland, Australia, and Cambodia, and published in the New York Times, CNN, The Telegraph, Der Spiegel, Washington Post, and other outlets.

Olga Kovalyova — Ukrainian photographer, project manager at the Ukrainian Association of Professional Photographers, coordinator and curator of art projects and social initiatives, and educator. She covers the Russo-Ukrainian war. On 19 July 2024, while working near the front line in the Toretsk sector of Donetsk Oblast, she came under enemy artillery fire and sustained multiple shrapnel wounds.

Serhii Korovayny — Ukrainian photojournalist known for covering the Russo-Ukrainian war. Regular contributor to the Wall Street Journal. His works have appeared in various publications and organizations, including Time Magazine, National Geographic, and the United Nations. Recipient of the James Foley Award in 2022. Prior to the war, he focused mainly on environmental documentary journalism in Ukraine. Fulbright Scholar.

Vladyslav Krasnoshchok — fine art photographer, since 2010 a member of the Kharkiv-based group "Shilo", which practices black-and-white documentary photography using technical manipulations (colorization, archival materials) and installations. Participant in Paris Photo (2021–2024) and Photo Basel (2023). His work documents hospitals and the Russo-Ukrainian war.

Kostiantyn and Vlada Liberov — a couple of documentary photographers from Odesa. Began working in war documentation after the start of the full-scale invasion. Their content has been published by BBC, Die Welt, Vogue, Forbes, and featured on official pages of the President of Ukraine. Kostiantyn was awarded the Ukrainian Order of Merit, 3rd class (2023); his photos were included in Time’s 100 Best Photos of 2022. They conduct workshops, participate in exhibitions across Europe, and their project “30 hours at ground zero” showcased the life of infantry soldiers.

Evgeniy Maloletka — photojournalist and reporter. Has worked with the Associated Press, covering the Revolution of Dignity, the COVID‑19 pandemic, and the Russo-Ukrainian War. In February–March 2022, he was one of the few journalists present in Mariupol during the Siege of Mariupol (2022), where he took a series of photographs from the Mariupol hospital airstrike, which earned him the World Press Photo of the Year award in 2023. He was also awarded the Pulitzer Prize for Public Service in 2023 and the Shevchenko National Prize in 2024.

Sasha Maslov — Ukrainian-American photographer and documentarian. His work appears in The New York Times, The Guardian, The Wall Street Journal, among others. Author of the photo books Ukrainian Railroad Ladies (2020), Veterans: Faces of World War II (2017), and Saints (2024), which explores the theme of Ukrainian sacrifice in the war. Ukrainian Railroad Ladies received the Sony World Photography Award (Portraiture). Winner of the Sony World Photo and LensCulture awards.

Serhii Melnychenko — Ukrainian photographer and dancer, founder of the MYPH platform for conceptual and art photography (2018). He began photographing in 2009. Winner of the Leica Oskar Barnack Award Newcomer (2017) — the first Ukrainian to receive this prize — and national “Photographer of the Year.” Has participated in over 150 exhibitions in Europe, the USA, and Asia; his projects have been presented at Paris Photo, Photo Basel, and other major platforms.

Serhiy Mykhalchuk — Ukrainian cinematographer and photographer. One of the leading cinematographers of contemporary Ukrainian cinema, worked on such films as Mamaj, The Guide, and The Wild Fields. Winner of numerous awards, including the cinematography prize at the Berlinale (2003), the Golden Dzyga for Best Cinematography (2019), and the Shevchenko National Prize (2021).

Vladyslav Musiienko — Ukrainian photojournalist and documentarian. Currently working with UNIAN. Covered the Euromaidan events, the War in Donbas and the Russian invasion of Ukraine (2022). His photographs are regularly published by Reuters, AFP, Getty Images, and Ukrainian media. The first Ukrainian shortlisted for the Sony World Photography Awards (Current Affairs category, 2015).

Mykhailo Palinchak — Ukrainian documentary photographer and photojournalist. Official photographer of President Petro Poroshenko (2014–2019). Author of numerous photo reports on events in Ukraine and abroad. His works have been published in Time, Le Monde, and The Guardian. Founder of the magazine Untitled and co-founder of the Ukrainian Street Photography group.

Pavlo Petrov — Ukrainian photographic artist. Major of the Civil Protection Service at the Main Department of the State Emergency Service of Ukraine in Kyiv. Documents the work of rescuers. During the Russian invasion of Ukraine, he has been capturing the aftermath of shelling. His works have been published in Time, Der Spiegel, and by the UNDP. On 6 June 2025, during a Russian drone and missile strike, he came under fire along with rescuers extinguishing a blaze and was hospitalized with injuries of varying severity.

Roman Pyatkovka — Ukrainian art photographer, one of the representatives of the Kharkiv School of Photography. Winner of the Sony World Photography Award (2013, People category) and participant of numerous international exhibitions. Curator of the annual project Ukrainian Photography in France. His works are held in the collections of Centre Pompidou (Paris), Museum of Contemporary Photography (Chicago), ARTOTHEK (Nuremberg), Museum of Kharkiv School of Photography (Kharkiv), among others. Actively works in the genre of art and conceptual photography.

Yevhen Samuchenko — Ukrainian travel photographer and photographic artist. His works have been featured in The New York Times, The Times, CNN, N-Photo, Bruckmann Publisher, National Geographic, Story Terrace, BBC, BuzzFeed, and on the official websites of UNESCO and Nikon. Author of the photo book The Beauty of Ukraine (2022), which was included in the Stanford Library collection and named one of the Top 10 travel books of 2022 by The Daily Telegraph. Recipient of four FIAP gold medals and the World Master of Photography award (Vienna, 2022).

Iva Sidash — Ukrainian documentary photographer. Finalist of the international Fujifilm Moment Street Photo Awards 2021. Documents the Russian invasion of Ukraine, focusing on civilian life. Her work has been published in INSIDER, Financial Times, Der Spiegel, The Fisheye Magazine, The Ukrainians, Bird in Flight, and others.

Alina Smutko — Ukrainian documentary photographer and photojournalist. From 2016 to 2019, she worked in occupied Crimea as a freelance reporter for the Ukrainian bureau of Radio Free Europe/Radio Liberty. In 2019, Russian authorities banned her from entering Crimea and Russia due to her professional activities. She documents the Russian invasion of Ukraine, with images from 24 February 2022 — including those from Kyiv — published by The Independent. She has received awards from the Nikon Photo Contest 2019 (Tokyo, Japan) and the Corporate Photo Contest RFE/RL 2019 (Prague, Czech Republic). Her photographs have appeared in The New York Times, The Telegraph, Politico, Der Spiegel, National Geographic, and Reuters.

Anatoliy Stepanov — Ukrainian photographer. Active in professional journalism since 2004. His work has been widely published in National Geographic, Spiegel, Stern, Time, and many other international outlets. Has been documenting the Russo-Ukrainian War (since 2014) since its beginning in 2014, primarily in cooperation with France Press.

Mstyslav Chernov — Ukrainian filmmaker, videographer, photographer, photojournalist, war correspondent, and writer. Covered the Revolution of Dignity, War in Donbas, aftermath of the Malaysia Airlines Flight 17 shootdown, the Syrian civil war, the Battle of Mosul in Iraq, and the Russian invasion of Ukraine, including the Siege of Mariupol (2022). Associated Press journalist and president of the Ukrainian Association of Professional Photographers. Director of the films 20 Days in Mariupol and 2000 Meters to Andriivka. Laureate of the Shevchenko National Prize (2024), the Pulitzer Prize, and the Academy Award (2024). Recipient of the Directors Guild of America Award, the Livingston Award, the Rory Peck Award, the Royal Television Society Award, the DW Freedom of Speech Award, and the Press Freedom Prize by Reporters Without Borders.

== Selected exhibitions ==
In total, according to the official website, UAPP has implemented more than 250 exhibition projects.

Title	Year	Location	Link
Mariupol — The City That Refused to Die	2025	Berlin (Germany)	
«Russian War Crimes»	2022–2025	Brussels (Belgium), Kyiv (Ukraine), New York (USA), Cologne (Germany), London (United Kingdom), Davos (Switzerland), Munich (Germany), Vilnius (Lithuania), Bratislava (Slovakia), Berlin (Germany), Storrs (USA)	
«Bakhmuth - the face of genocide (1942–2022)»	2022–2025	Lviv, Kyiv, Kaunas (Lithuania)	
WEYUAPP	2024	Ukraine, Italy, Poland, Germany	
The brave carry the light	2023–2024	Lviv, Kyiv, Odesa, Kharkiv, The Hague (Netherlands)	
«Ukraine: The Path to Freedom»	2023	Akerkhof, Groningen (Netherlands)	
«Gesichter des Krieges»	2023	Germany	
«BEARING WITNESS: DOCUMENTING WAR CRIMES IN MARIUPOL, UKRAINE»	2023	New York (USA)	
«Flash. Ukrainian photography today»	2023	Kyiv (Ukraine)	
«Bojují i za nás»	2022	Czech Republic, Belgium та USA	
«UNABHÄNGIGKEIT! Fotografien aus der Ukraine 1991–2022»	2022	Germany	
Hunger as a weapon	2022	Lithuania	
The Holodomor and the War: Ukraine in 1932–1933 and in 2022	2022	Graz та Vienna (Austria)	
MARIUPOL: Photographs & Video by Evgeniy Maloletka and Mstyslav Chernov	2022	USA	
«Ukraine on my mind»	2022	Atlanta (USA)	
Mariupol	2022	Sarajevo (Bosnia and Herzegovina)	
Siege of Mariupol – the last journalists in the occupied city	2022	Prague (Czech Republic)	
The price of freedom	2022	Helsinki (Finland)	
«Tragedy of the 21st century in the centre of Europe»	2022	Cyprus	
Moments Among the Ruins: Documentary Photographs from Ukraine. People at War	2022	Graz (Austria)	
That's an order, SORRI.	2022	Germany	
Ukrainian Guernica	2022	Tbilisi (Georgia)	
«Ukraine Now: Darkness vs Light. Children Dream about Peace»	2022	India	
Virtual gallery: Unbreakable. Chronicles of the war in Ukraine	2022	online	
SMS from Mariupol	2022	Stuttgart та Dresden (Germany)	
Those Alone	2021	online	

== See also ==
- Federation of European Professional Photographers
- Photography in Ukraine
- Documentary photography
- Photojournalism
