= Marta Syrko =

Ukrainian artist (born 1995)

- Marta Syrko
- Born: 1995 (age 30–31); Lviv, Ukraine
- Known for: Fine art photography

Marta Syrko is a visual artist from Lviv exploring themes of memory, identity, beauty, and the legacy of classical art. Syrko gained international recognition for her series documenting wounded Ukrainian soldiers and civilians. Her work has been featured in The Guardian, The Irish Times, Euronews, and other publications.

In 2025 Marta Syrko was included in Forbes' list of "10 Women Preserving And Shaping Ukrainian Art And Culture". In 2026, Marta Syrko became a Canon Ambassador in Ukraine as part of the international Canon EMEA program. Marta Syrko is also the founder of OBRA, a school dedicated to artistic vision and visual thinking.

== Education and Inspiration ==
Born in Lviv in 1995, Syrko studied art history and art theory at Lviv National Academy of Arts.

Although her primary medium is photography, Syrko draws inspiration from Greco-Roman sculpture, Renaissance artists like Michelangelo, and sculptors like Bernini and Rodin. One of her greatest sources of inspiration has been the famous Winged Victory of Samothrace sculpture from Greece.

Marta Syrko's artistic practice centres on the human body as both a physical form and a bearer of memory. Her work examines corporeality in relation to personal history, social experience, and the cultural conventions through which the human figure is represented. Working with light, water, glass, textiles, reflections, and optical distortion, she explores the changing appearance of the human form, its contours, and its interaction with the surrounding space.

Marta Syrko has collaborated with a gallery in Amsterdam and Dutch National Opera & Ballet, presented her works in Paris, Istanbul, Venice, London, Kyiv, Lviv, and other cities across the world. In 2019, her series Light Dance was presented at the ImageNation Paris exhibition.

== Series ==
=== Sun Children ===
In 2020, Syrko debuted the Sun's Children series, a collection of portraits of children with Down syndrome, in order to ease the social stigma surrounding their condition.

"When I was thinking about motherhood, I had a lot of internal questions, and that's how the project was born," Syrko told the Ukrainian Association of Professional Photographers about the series. "Now, by the way, we've reached the point where we can no longer call children with Down syndrome 'sunny.' I agree with this. I like what I see in society now in terms of inclusion. We are learning to speak, think, and coexist with each other correctly."

=== Underwater Dance ===
In 2021, Marta Syrko created Underwater Dance series, that became extension of her work with the modern perception of the body and the way water might change it. While working on the series, Marta placed dancers in the special underwater pool to investigate on how might common shapes change with the play of the light and physics. In 2026 this series was presented at the personal exhibition of Marta Syrko "Immersion: Seeing Otherwise" at RUZY Gallery, Istanbul. Exhibition became a part of 212 Photography Istanbul festival.

=== Sculpture Soldiers ===
Following Russia's invasion of Ukraine, Syrko began documenting Ukrainian survivors of war for her Sculpture Soldiers series. The images of Ukrainian soldiers evoke Sykro's inspiration from Greco-Roman sculptures, depicting them as mythological figures. The Kyiv Independent wrote that, "The scars and tattoos on their bodies convey a palpable tension between the inherent beauty of the human body and the violence they have endured."

"As artists, we participate in determining how societies remember, mourn, heal, and imagine the future," Syrko told MutualArt about the series.

As an extension of the project, Marta Syrko also worked on a documentary film with director Sashko Brama. The filmdeveloped the photographic research further, focusing on the personal stories of the series' participants.

== Educational Practice ==
In 2025, Marta Syrko founded OBRA School, that became a school of vision and helps young artists to discover and develop their ability to see beauty in the common things, turning this skill into art. After becoming ambassador of Canon Ukraine in 2026 year, Marta Syrko has also founded grant from Canon and OBRA School for the free education on Marta's private course.

== Awards ==
- First place at the International Photography Awards
- Second place at the International Photography Awards
