= Artem Humilevskyi =

Ukrainian photographer

- Артем Гумілевський
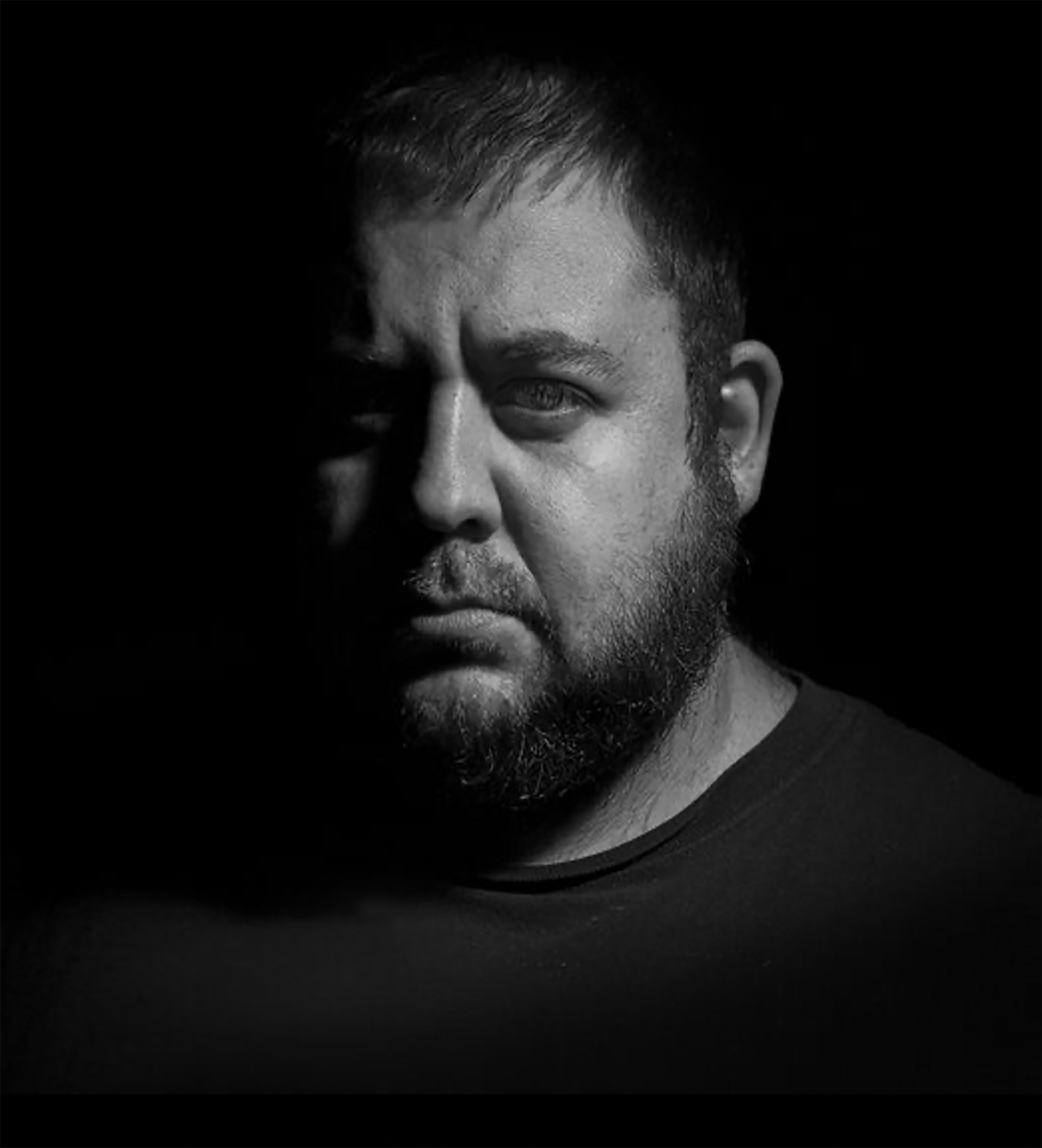
- Born: 1986 (age 39–40); Mykolaiv, Ukraine
- Education: Odesa National Academy of Food Technologies
- Website: humilevskiy.com

Artem Humilevskyi (Ukrainian: Артем Гумілевський, born 1986, Mykolaiv, Ukraine) is a Ukrainian photographer, manager. The main character of the project "Giant".

== Biography ==
Graduated from the Odesa National Academy of Food Technologies (engineering), Faculty of Economics and Entrepreneurship at Krok University. He has been working as a managing director of an agricultural company since 2003. He was an acting assistant to the Mykolaiv Oblast Council for Culture, Education and Sports.

In 2019, he graduated from the artistic photography course of the MYPH school by Serhii Melnychenko. Since then, he has been engaged in photography.

== Creativity ==
His works are kept at the Museum of the Kharkiv School of Photography, and they are also presented at Miami Art Basel (2022) and the Helsinki Photo Festival (2022).

Participant of collective exhibitions in Mykolaiv (2019), Kyiv (2019, 2020, 2021, 2022), Wrocław (2019, Poland), Kharkiv (2021), Kraków (2021, 2022; Poland), Klaipėda (2021, Lithuania), Helsinki (2022, Finland), Venice (2022, Italy), Vienna (2022, 2023; Austria), Cochem (2022, Germany), Hanover (2022, Germany), Toronto (2022, Canada), Regis, Petrith (2022, United Kingdom), Kreuzlingen (2022, Switzerland), Oslo (2023, Norway) and the online gallery BAROQUE (2022).

== Awards ==
- 2021 – finalist of the Nida OFF competition (Nida, Lithuania);
- 2022 – winner's medal of the Global Peace Photo Award (Austria) for the project "Giant";
- 2022 – nominated for the PinchukArtCentre Prize (Kyiv).
