= Federation of European Professional Photographers =

Federation of European Photographers
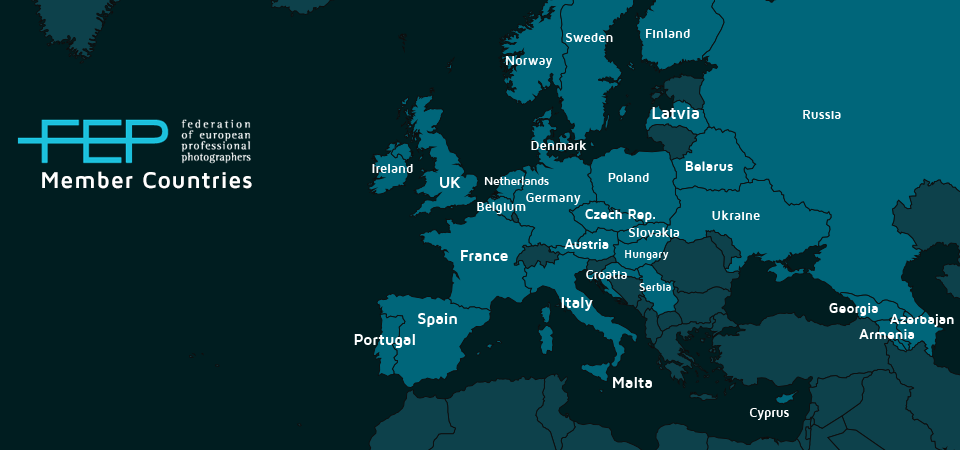
- Map of FEP Member associations

- FEP Official Logo
- Abbreviation: FEP
- Formation: 1992; 34 years ago
- Dissolved: n/a
- Type: INGO
- Legal status: Federation
- Purpose: Professional
- Headquarters: Brussels, Belgium
- Location: Europe-wide
- Region served: Europe
- Members: Full members, Affiliate members, Individual members
- President: Truls Løtvedt
- Key people: Anna Kaleva-Tsagklas (CEO)
- Main organ: Board of Directors
- Website: europeanphotographers.eu

The Federation of European Professional Photographers or Federation of European Photographers (FEP) is a nonprofit organization that organizes national professional photographers associations in the geographic area represented by the Council of Europe and has 25 member organizations in some 21 countries (2024). FEP is officially headquartered in Brussels. The Secretariat is in Rome. As the central reference authority for Photography in the European Union, it represents over 50.000 professional photographers in Europe.

The FEP is composed of the national professional associations of the following countries: Austria, Belarus, Belgium, Bulgaria, Czech Republic, Denmark, Finland, France, Georgia, Germany, Iceland, Ireland, Italy, Norway, Portugal, Slovakia, Spain, Sweden, The Netherlands, Ukraine and United Kingdom.

== Core principles ==
The FEP defends the rights of professional photographers directly and in communion with national and international organisations. It represents the interests of member associations on a global scale on topics like education, training, professional standards, authors rights, etc. The FEP cooperates in the organisation of national events of member associations and international congresses, and promotes an exchange of keynote speakers.

== History ==
First FEP meeting took place in photokina in year 1992. It was decided to form an unrelated Federation of some national Associations. Franco Turcati, from Italy, was inaugurated as its President.

For a couple of years, the association met only as a "European annexe" to the WCPP (World Council of Professional Photographers), a global organization based in United States. The President of WCPP attended FEP meetings as a guest. There were endless and tiring discussions to decide if FEP should exist as a self-governing organization. In those years, new members joined the Federation, and finally the new constitution was formally approved at the General Assembly held in Gmunden, Austria on April 4, 1997, signed by the founder members (the Associations of Professional Photographers in Austria, Belgium, Czech Republic, France, Germany, Ireland, Italy, United Kingdom and Yugoslavia). The FEP was finally registered under Belgian Law in January 1999.

The main aim of the FEP was to validate the standard of qualifications of professional photographers throughout Europe. In 1998, with help of the British Institute of Professional Photography (the BIPP), the FEP instigated a European qualification called QEP.

In 2011 FEP joined the UEAPME, the European craft and SME’s network and the International Photographic Council at the UN.

== Professional qualifications ==
FEP offer to the Professional Photographers a system of qualifications which are recognized and accepted throughout Europe. These European qualifications which are known as EP, QEP and MQEP will complement but not replace any national qualification for Professional Photographers.

The European Photographer (EP) qualification aims to recognise competence and a professional standard for those who earn their lives as Professional Photographers. It is designed to complement the lack of a specific title to uphold the professional status. The EP is a new basic quality assurance certification now available to most general Professional Photographers throughout Europe.

The Qualified European Photographer (QEP) qualification aims to recognise and reward excellence in European Professional Photographers. It is designed to complement national awards systems and has created a Europe-wide network of more than 500 certified experts who share a passion and talent for professional photography.

The Master Qualified European Photographer (MQEP) is the European most distinguished award for outstanding photographers. The certificate is reserved for the best QEP holders. To date, about 100 Top European Photographers have received a master's degree for their supreme quality.

You must be a member of an FEP member association to apply for the FEP European qualifications.

== Competitions ==
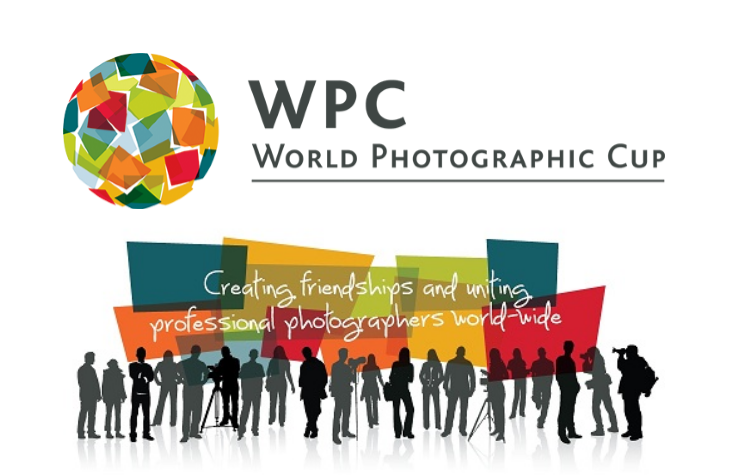
World Photographic Cup

- Since 2008 – first FEP Professional Photographer of the Year Award run by FEP was launched.
- Since 2010 – the Photo Book Award
- Since 2013 – the FEP Emerging Talent Award (FETA), called the Young Photographer Award (YPA) since 2020
- Since 2013 – World Photographic Cup (in cooperation with Professional Photographers of America), a not-for-profit organization founded as a cooperative effort by The Federation of European Photographers (FEP) and Professional Photographers of America (PPA). Its singular goal is to unite photographers in a spirit of friendship and cooperation.

== Member associations list ==
| Name | Country | Note |
|---|---|---|
| Armenian Photographers National Association | Armenia | Not a Member Association |
| Bundesinnung Berufsfotografie | Austria | Active (Member Association) |
| Azerbaijan Photographers Union | Azerbaijan | Not a Member Association |
| beroepsfotografen.be | Belgium | Active (Member Association) |
| vzw Studio | Belgium | Active (Member Association) |
| Union Professionnelle des Photographes Francophones - U2PF | Belgium | Active (Member Association) |
| Belarusian Association of Photographers - BPA | Belarus | Active (Member Association) |
| Bulgarian Association of Professional Photographers | Bulgaria | Active (Member Association) |
| Cyprus Professional Photographers Association - CPPA | Cyprus | Active (Member Association) |
| ULUPUH | Croatia | Not a Member Association |
| Asociace Profesionálních Fotografù Ceské Republiky - APFČR | Czech Republic | Active (Member Association) |
| Dansk Fotografisk Forening - DFF | Denmark | Active (Member Association) |
| Suomen Ammattivalokuvaajat ry | Finland | Active (Member Association) |
| Fédération Française de la Photographie et des Métiers de l'image - FFPMI | France | Active (Member Association) |
| Association of Photographers of Georgia | Georgia | Active (Member Association) |
| CentralVerband Deutscher Berufsfotografen | Germany | Active (Member Association) |
| BPIP - Budapest Fotóintézet | Hungary | Not a Member Association |
| Irish Professional Photographers & Videographers Association - IPPVA | Ireland | Active (Member Association) |
| CNA Comunicazione/Fotografi | Italy | Active (Member Association) |
| Confartigianato Fotografi | Italy | Active (Member Association) |
| Latvian Photographers Federation NGO | Latvia | Not a Member Association |
| Malta Institute of Professional Photography | Malta | Not a Member Association |
| Dutch Professional Photographers - DuPho | Netherlands | Active (Member Association) |
| Norges Fotografforbund | Norway | Active (Member Association) |
| The Union of Artist Photographers of Poland | Poland | Not a Member Association |
| APPImagem - Associação Portuguesa dos Profissionais da Imagem | Portugal | Active (Member Association) |
| Guild of Advertising Photographers, The | Russia | Not a Member Association |
| Association of Independent Art Photographers - USUF | Serbia | Not a Member Association |
| Slovak Professional Photographers | Slovakia | Active (Member Association) |
| Asociácia Profesionálnych Fotografov Slovenskej Republiky - APFSR | Slovakia | Active (Member Association) |
| FEPFI - Federación Española de Profesionales de la Fotografía y de la Imagen | Spain | Active (Member Association) |
| Svenska FotoGruppen - SFG | Sweden | Active (Member Association) |
| Ukrainian Association of Professional Photographers - UAPP | Ukraine | Active (Member Association) |
| National Society of Photo Artists of Ukraine | Ukraine | Not a Member Association |
| British Institute of Professional Photography - BIPP | United Kingdom | Active (Member Association) |
