= Yevhen Samuchenko =

Ukrainian photo artist

- Євген Самученко
- Born: Odesa, Ukraine
- Website: q-l-n.com

Yevhen Samuchenko (Ukrainian: Євген Самученко; creative pseudonym Q-lieb-in; born in Odesa, Ukraine) is a Ukrainian travel photographer and photo artist.

Member of the International Federation of Photographic Arts (AFIAP, 2016; EFIAP, 2019), Global Photographic Association of China (2019), Ukrainian Association of Professional Photographers (2017).

== Biography ==
He became interested in film photography at the age of 12, and since 2012 has been working with digital photography. Yevhen's works were published in The New York Times, The Times, CNN, N-Photo, Bruckmann Publisher, National Geographic, Story Terrace, BBC, BuzzFeed, on the official websites of UNESCO and Nikon. He conducted more than 60 master classes and workshops.

He is the co-author of the photo book The Beauty of Ukraine (2022, teNeues Verlag, Germany; English, German and Ukrainian languages), which is included in the Stanford Library fund (2023) and entered the top 10 of the best travel books according to The Daily Telegraph.

Judge of the international photo contests.

== Exhibitions ==
=== Personal exhibitions ===
- 2020 — At the Pink Planet, Kherson Regional Universal Scientific Library named after Oles Honchar, Kherson;
- 2018 — One Day on Mars, Kolkata, India;
- 2017 — One Day on Mars, Kyiv School of Photography, Kyiv;
- 2017 — One Day on Mars, "Dzyga" gallery, Lviv.

=== Group shows ===
- 2022 — Earth Photo 2022, Royal Geographical Society, London, UK;
- 2022 — NFT exhibition on LED screens at Times Square, New York, USA;
- 2022 — World Masters of Photography exhibition, Lik Academy of Photography and Design, Vienna, Austria;
- 2022 — Travel Photographer of the Year exhibition, London, UK;
- 2019 — Exhibition of winners of Nature Photographer of the Year, Netherlands.

=== Museum expositions ===
- 2022 — Museum of Gloucester, UK;
- 2022 — FMOPA Museum, USA;
- 2022 — MEAA Museum, Great UK;
- 2021— City Art Museum "Sakura", Japan;
- 2021 — Ward Museum, USA;
- 2021 — Museums of Science and Industry, Manchester, UK;
- 2020 — Museum of Transport and Technology, Auckland, New Zealand;
- 2019 — Science Museum, London, UK;
- 2017 — Parkhomivka Museum of History and Arts, Kharkiv region, Ukraine;
- 2016 — National Watch and Clock Museum, Columbia, Pennsylvania, USA;
- 2014 — Odesa National Art Museum, Odesa.

== Awards ==
- four FIAP gold medals;
- 7 HIPA gold medals;
- Life Press Photo silver medal and HIPA Merit medal;
- 2022 — 1st place in the "Photojournalism" category, World Master of Photography Award Trophy, Vienna, Austria;
- 2022 – highly commended, category "Landscapes and Adventures", Travel Photographer of the Year;
- 2021 — Grand Prix, New York Center for Photographic Art Photo Contest, USA;
- 2021 — Grand Prix, Samyang Photo Contest;
- 2019 — II place, Night category, Travel Photographer of the Year;
- 2019 — III place, Landscape category, Nature Photographer of the Year;
- 2019 — HIPA cup, 3rd place, Portfolio category, HIPA Awards;
- 2020 — Shortlist of the Sony World Photo Awards international competition;
- 2020 — Shortlist of the International Mountain, Nature and Adventure Photo Contest;
- 2014 — 5th and 7th places in the top 10 best photos of the year and victory in the nomination "The best photo of the Cherkasy region" of the international contest "Wiki Loves Monuments";
- 2015 — 5th, 6th, and 8th places in the special category "Let's illuminate the lightless" of the international contest "Wiki Loves Earth";
- 2016 — winner in the nomination "The best photo of the Cherkasy region" of the international contest "Wiki loves the Earth".

== Gallery ==
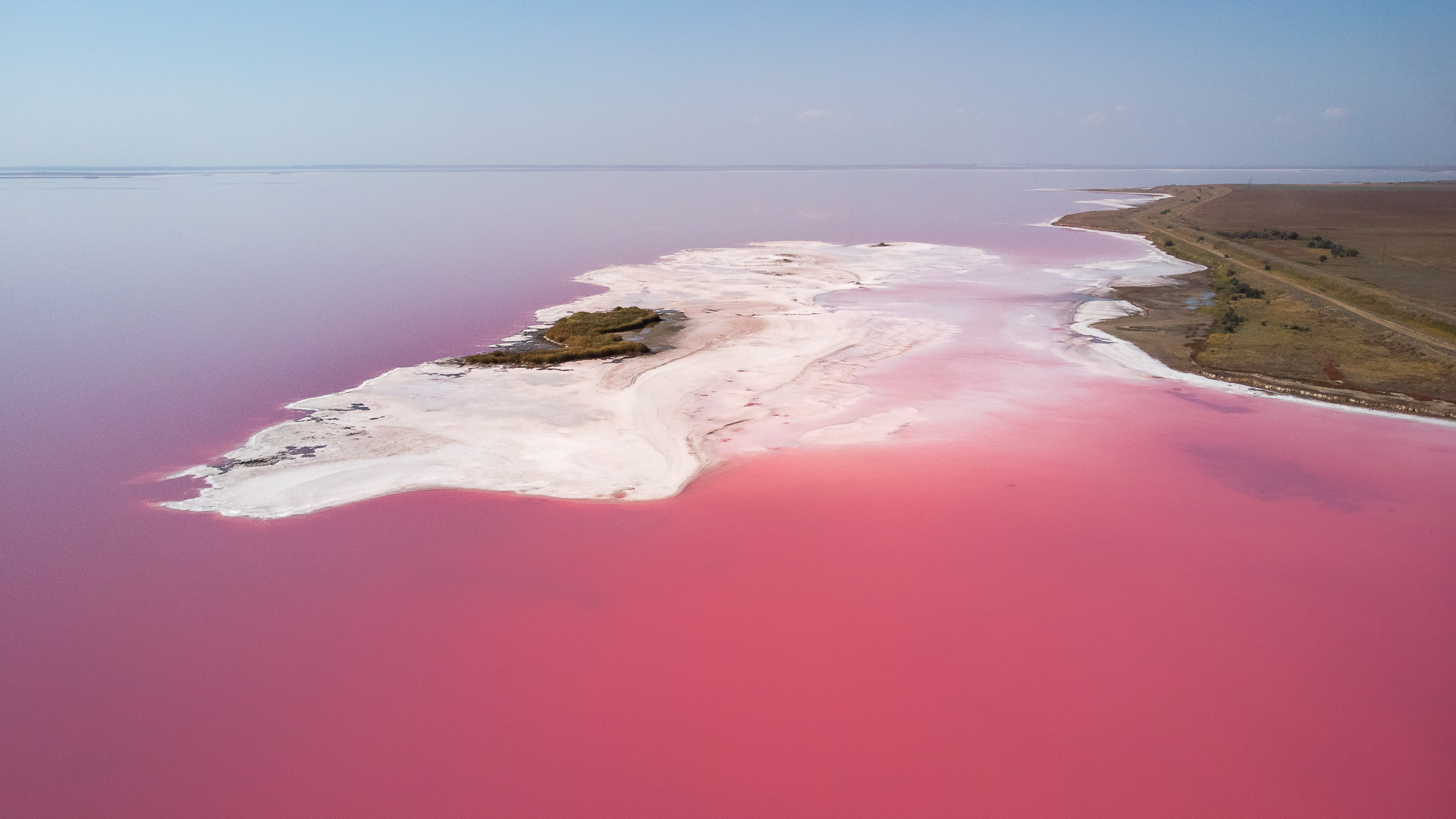

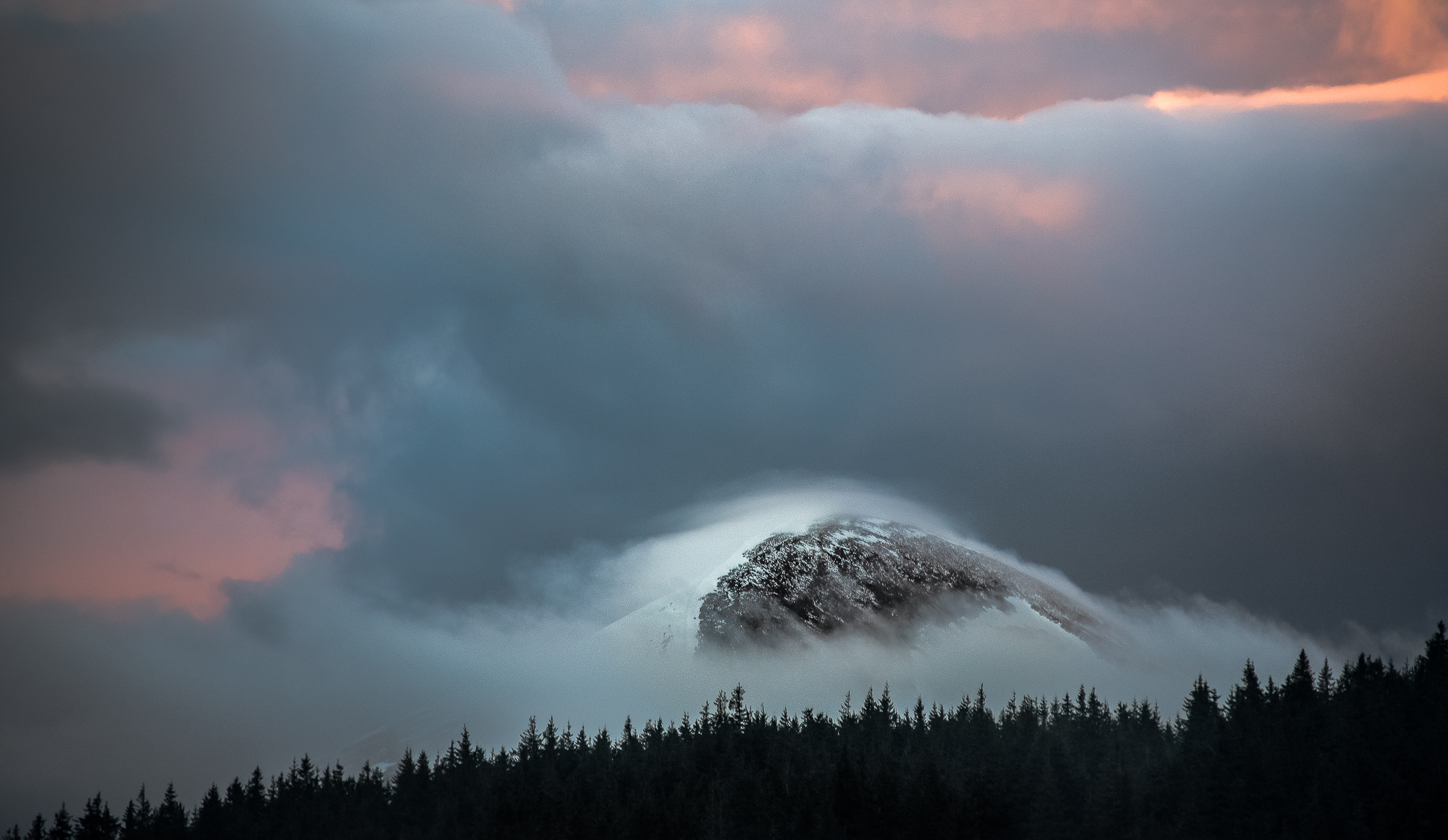

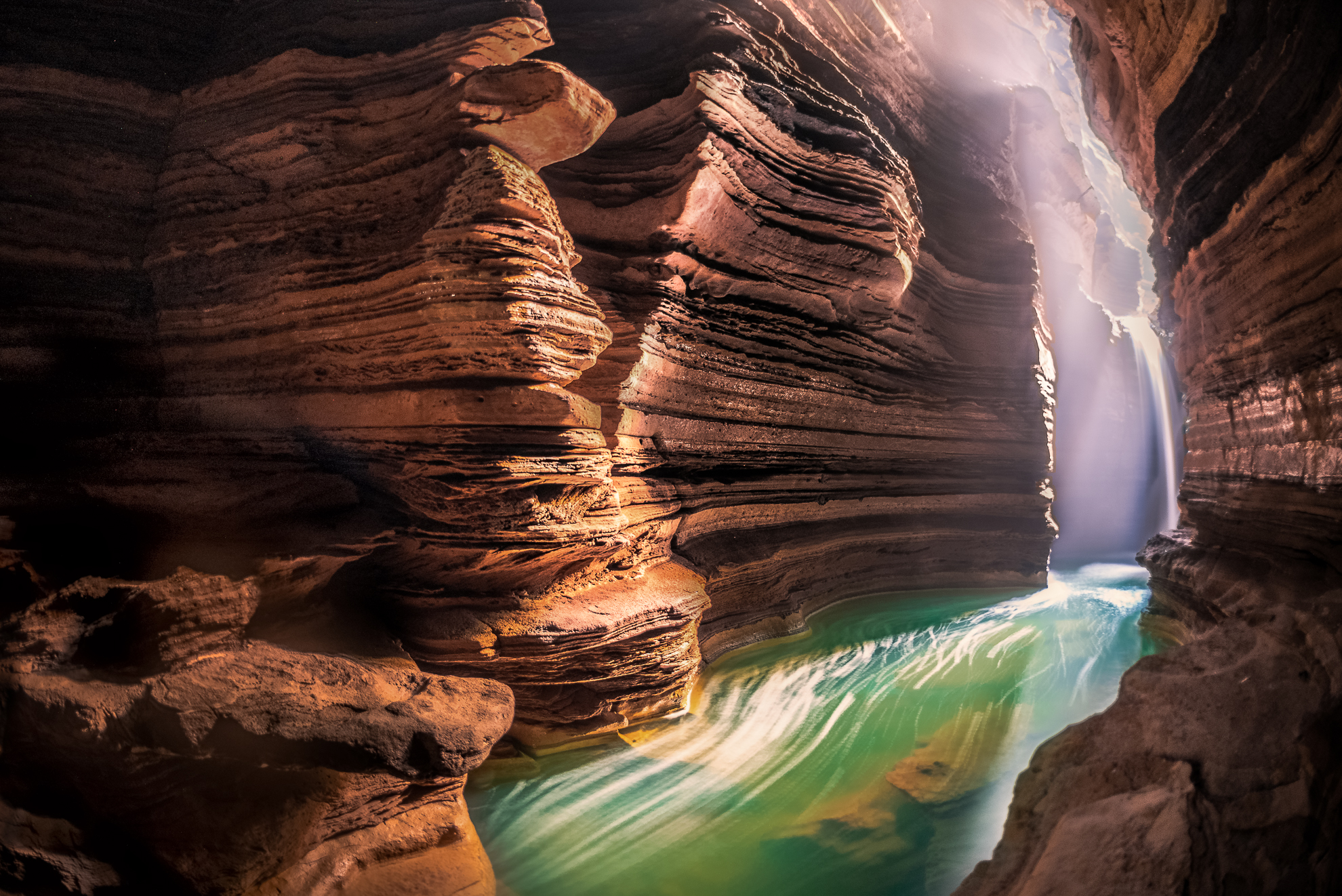

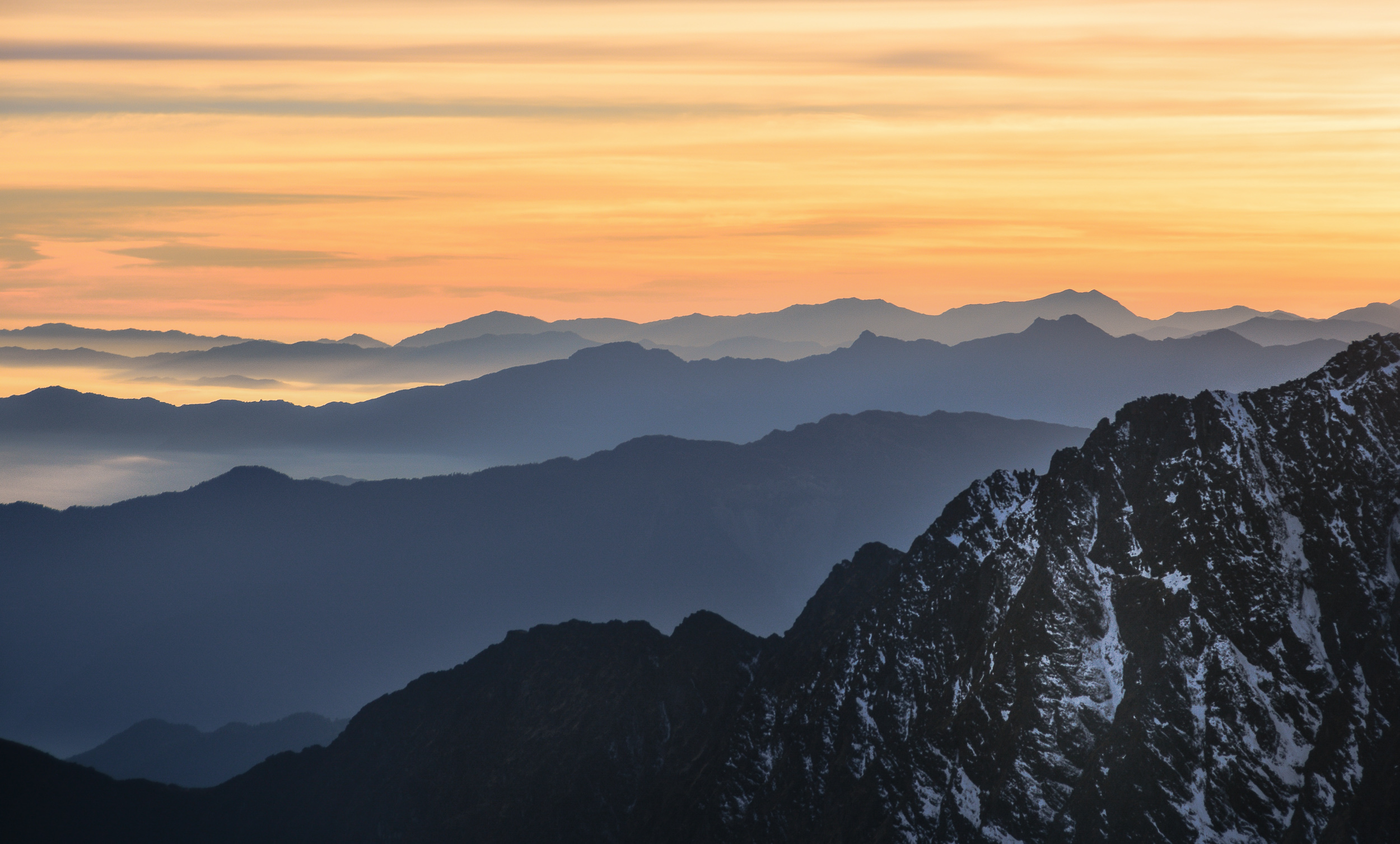

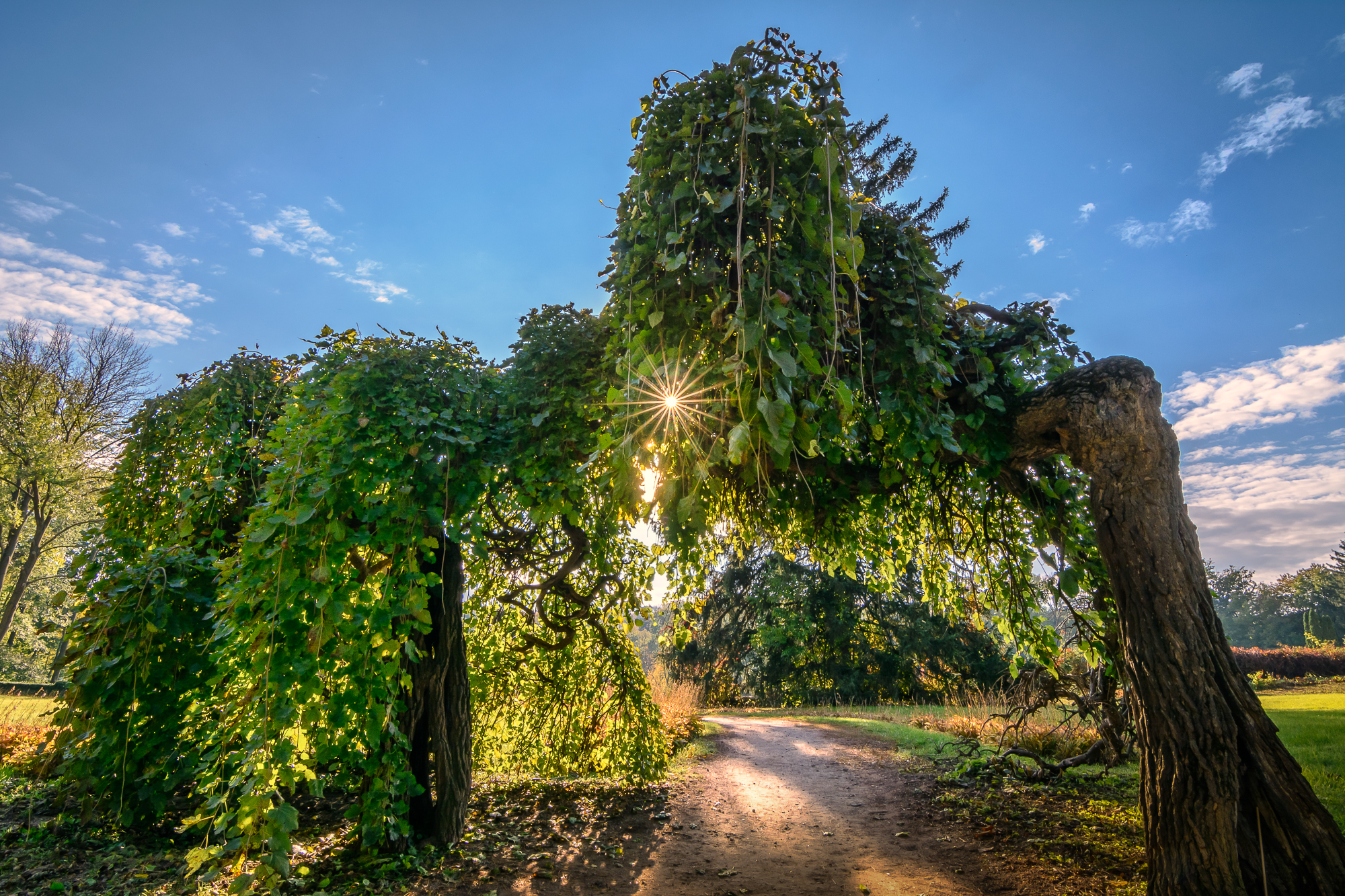

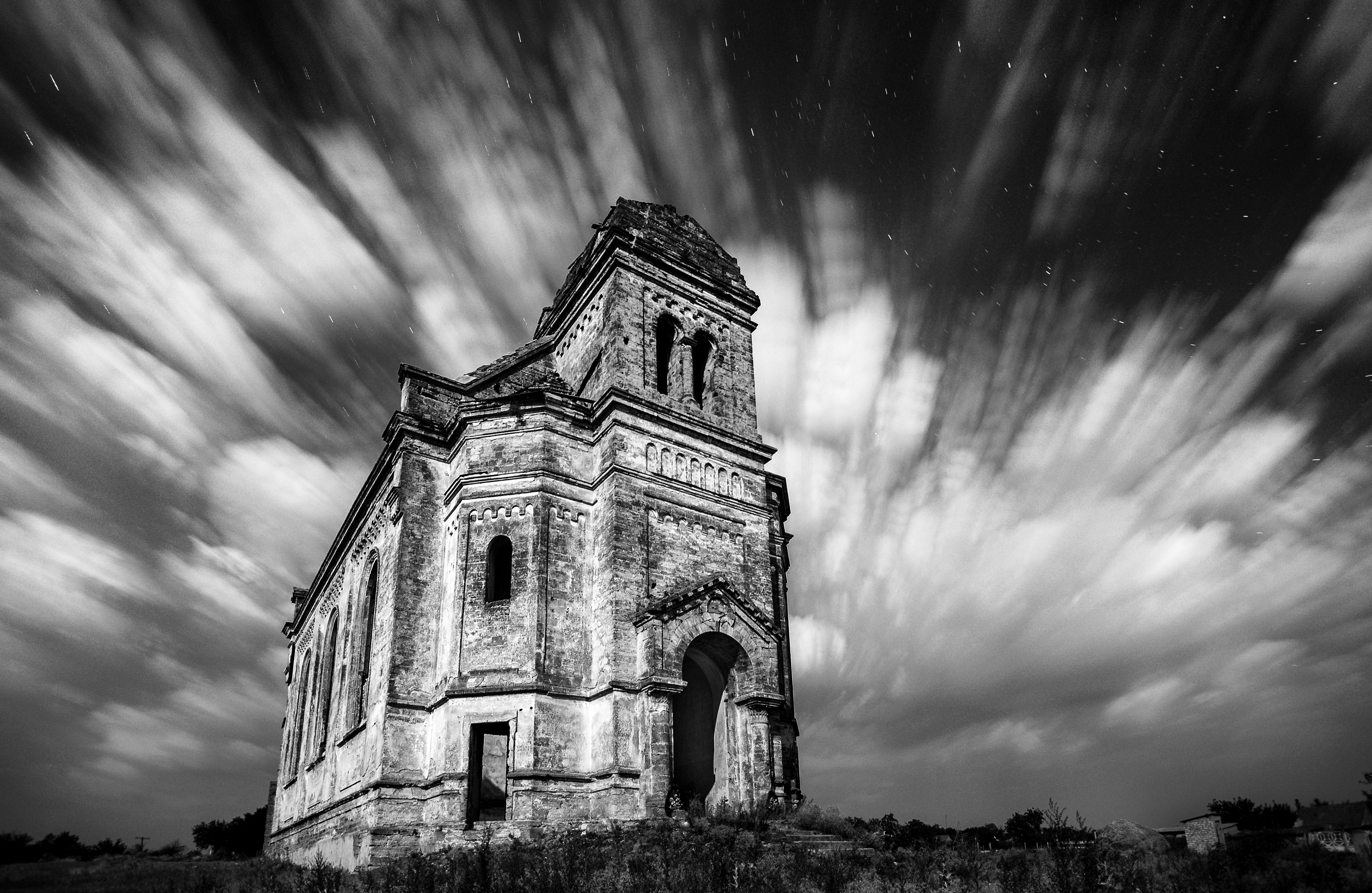

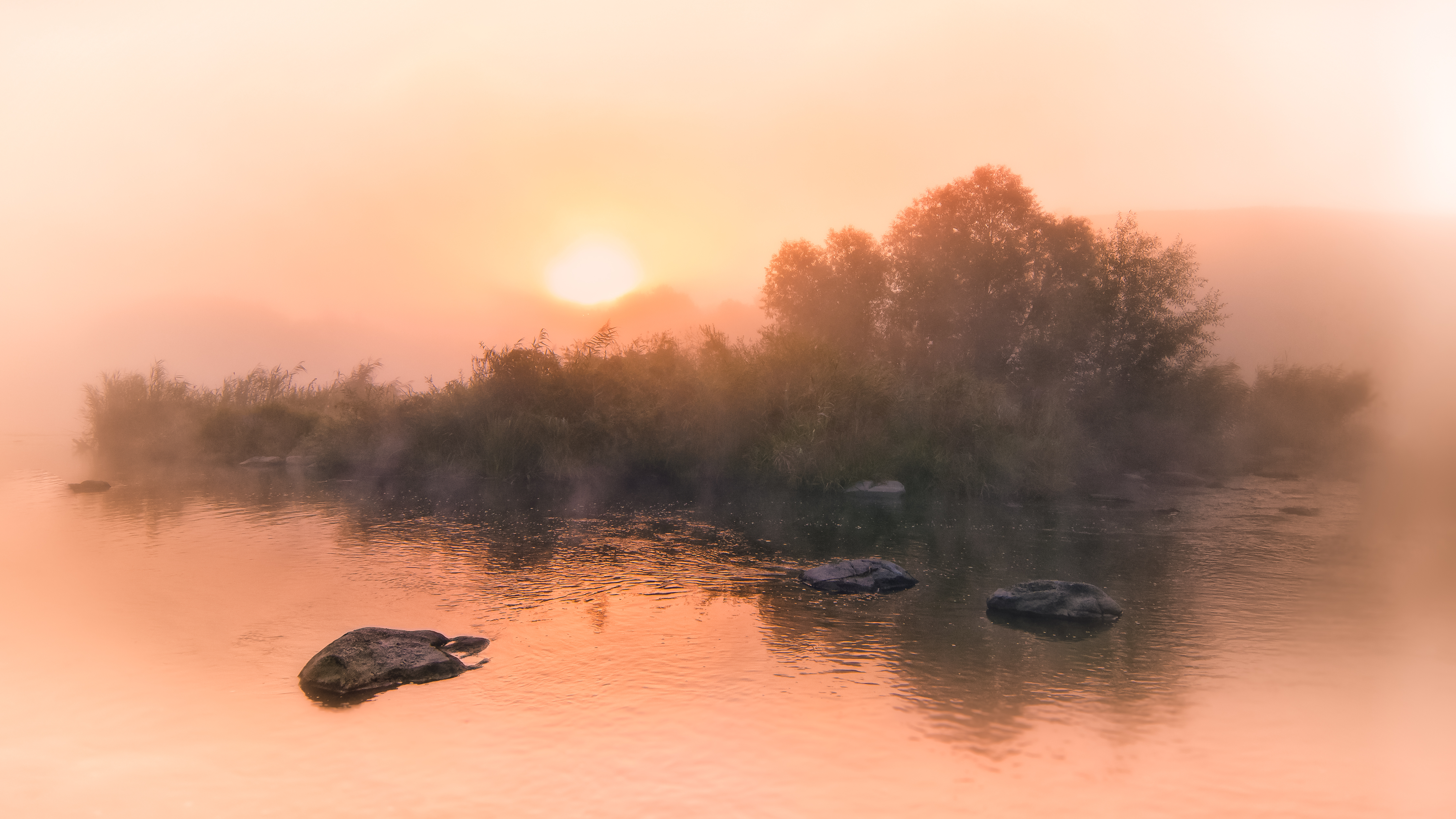

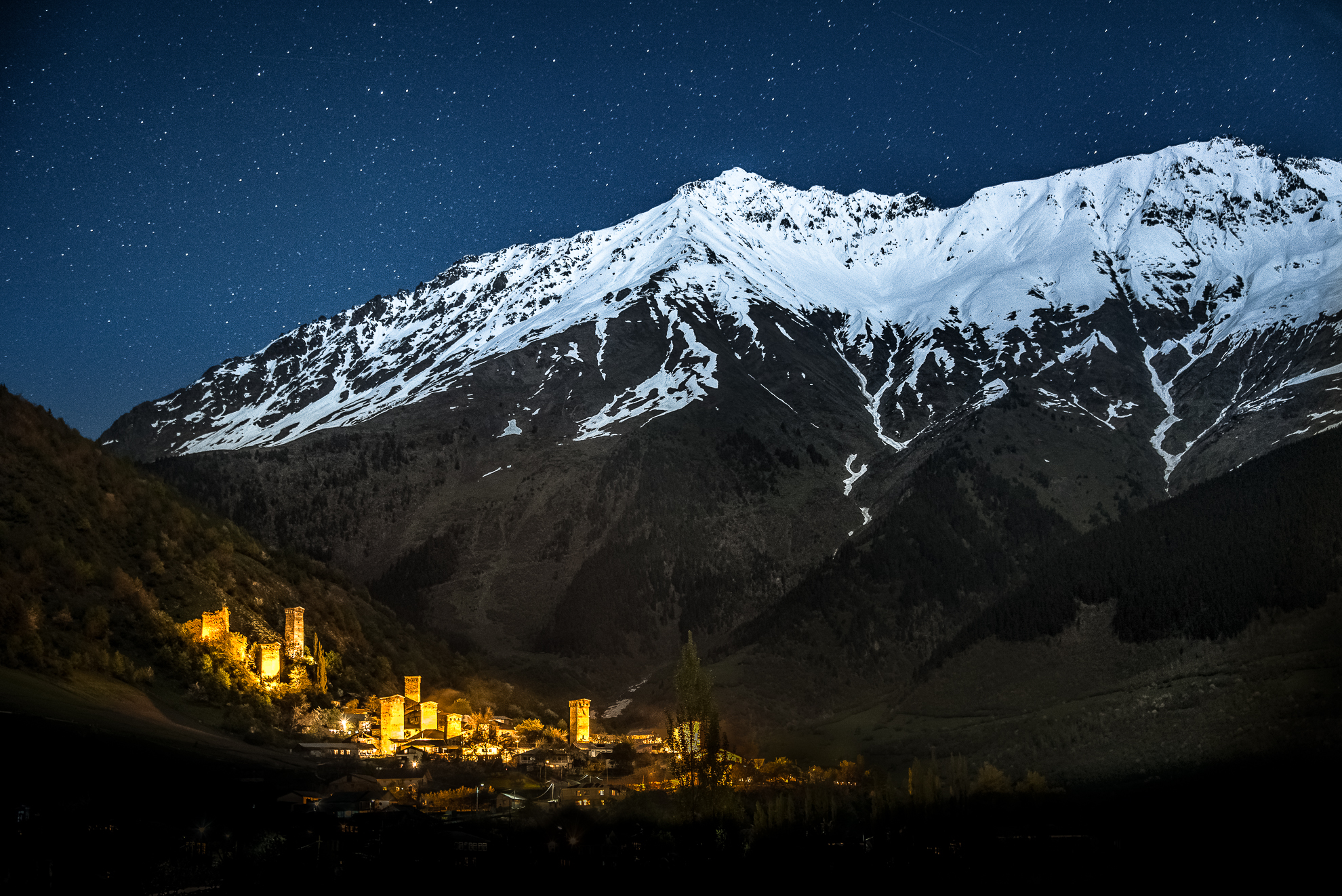
