= Amira Suleyman =

Azerbaijani photographer (born 1985)

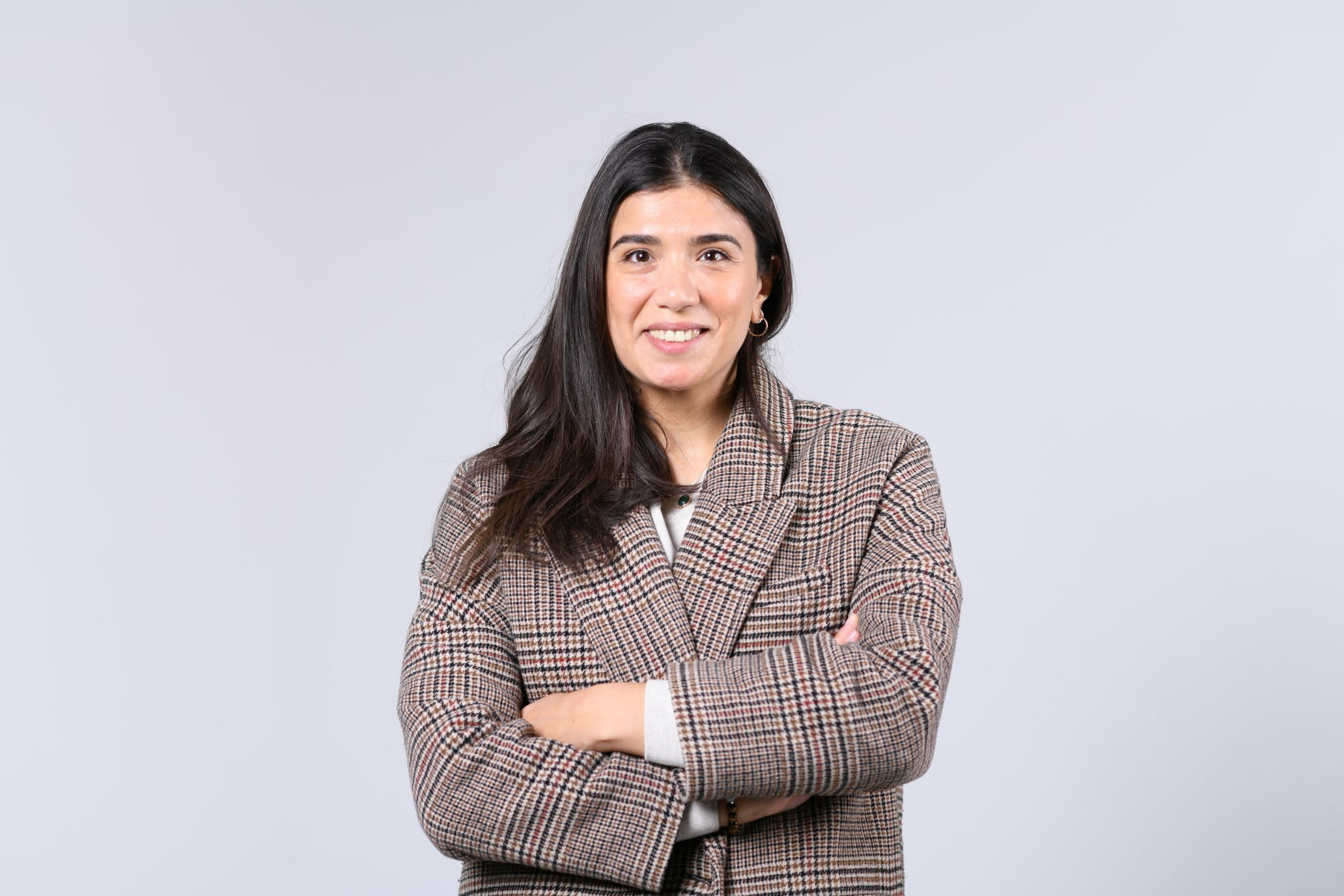
- Born: Amira Najaf gizi Suleyman; 10 May 1985 (age 40); Əmircan, Baku
- Citizenship: Soviet Union; Azerbaijan
- Occupation: Photographer
- Known for: artist and photographer

Amira Suleyman (Azerbaijani: Amira Najaf gizi Suleyman; 10 May 1985) is an Azerbaijani artist and photographer. She has been chair of the Azerbaijan Photographers Union since 2023.

== Her life and activities ==
Suleyman was born on May 10, 1985, in the village of Əmircan, Baku. She has been working as a photographer since 2004. In 2010, she became a member of the Azerbaijan Photographers Union, and since 2013, she has worked as a photographer at SOCAR's "Ekol Engineering Services" Closed Joint Stock Company. She attended photography classes and seminars in Ankara and Bursa. In 2022, he was elected a member of the board of directors and Deputy Chairman of the Azerbaijan Photographers Union, and since 2023, she has served as the Chairman of the Union. In 2024, she was elected Chairman of the Azerbaijan Photographers Union.

She participated in the photo exhibition "Magical Ordubad" held in Ordubad district on the occasion of the 101st anniversary of Heydar Aliyev's birth, and in the cultural event in Ganja - the photo exhibition "Ganja, Witness of Centuries" as an organizer. In her speech at the photo exhibition "Ganja, Witness of Centuries", Amira Suleyman noted the launch of a new project called "Visit Ganja". The purpose of this project is to increase the tourism potential of Ganja and create an attractive place for local and foreign tourists. Within the framework of this project, it is planned to prepare tourist routes, publish a tourism map and a thematic catalog.

Suleyman participated in a photo project reflecting the post-war situation in Lachin, and her works were exhibited at the photo exhibition "On the Wings of Time: Fuzuli" held on the occasion of Fuzuli City Day and at the photo exhibition "Kalbajar - Through the Lens to History" held on the occasion of Kalbajar City Day. She also participated in the photo exhibition "5th Year of Victory: Steps of the Great Return" in Jabrayil, where she spoke about the participation of photographers in covering the Great Return and creating a photo chronicle of the return to Karabakh and East Zangezur.

Under her chairmanship, the Azerbaijan Photographers Union's photo exhibition titled Karabakh: Memory of National Heritage was displayed in Tajikistan . The cultural heritage of Karabakh, as well as the pre- and post-war situation of Karabakh, and the restoration work carried out were displayed here.
