= Azerbaijan Photographers Union =

Non-profit organization

The Azerbaijan Photographers Union (APU) is a public, creative, non-profit organization based on the principles of an open society, voluntarism, and self-governance. It acts under the Constitution of Azerbaijan and the Charter of the Union. The Azerbaijan Photographers Union was registered with the Ministry of Justice of the Azerbaijan Republic on the 20th of November, 1998, by certificate number 1073.

At the beginning of the 1990s, with the collapse of the USSR, all working structures became worthless, and it became apparent that there was a need for an organization in which professional and amateur photographers, all those who are devoted to photographic art, would join together. A significant unifying moment for the organization was the preparation and holding of the Photographers of Azerbaijan exhibition in Nantes, France, in November 1995, where 105 works by 24 photographers were presented. After the exhibition in France, there were three years of debates, compliance with the charter, and overcoming obstacles. An initiative group was formed to tackle these issues and to officially register the Union, although the Union had been active since 1994 on a voluntary basis, without legal status.

The main purposes and tasks of the APU are the promotion of the national development of photographic art, the popularization of its achievements in the country and abroad, and the preservation and creative use of photographic heritage. To promote and develop photographic art, the Union organizes exhibitions, competitions, festivals, master classes, conferences, and symposia with the participation of Azerbaijani and foreign photographers. The APU promotes amateur photography, as well.

The members of the APU have organized and taken part in more than 100 exhibitions, including more than 30 in foreign countries, including the United States, United Kingdom, France, Turkey, Germany, Belgium, Ukraine, Greece, Russia, Mongolia, Uzbekistan, Kazakhstan, and Georgia.

The Chairman of the Board was Mirnaib Hasanoglu, until Amira Suleyman was elected Chairman in 2024. Under her leadership, the Union held a photo exhibition entitled Karabakh: Memory of a National Heritage showcases the national heritage of Karabakh as the impact and restoration from the Patriotic war.
