= Serhii Melnychenko =

Ukrainian photographer (born 1991)

- Сергій Мельниченко
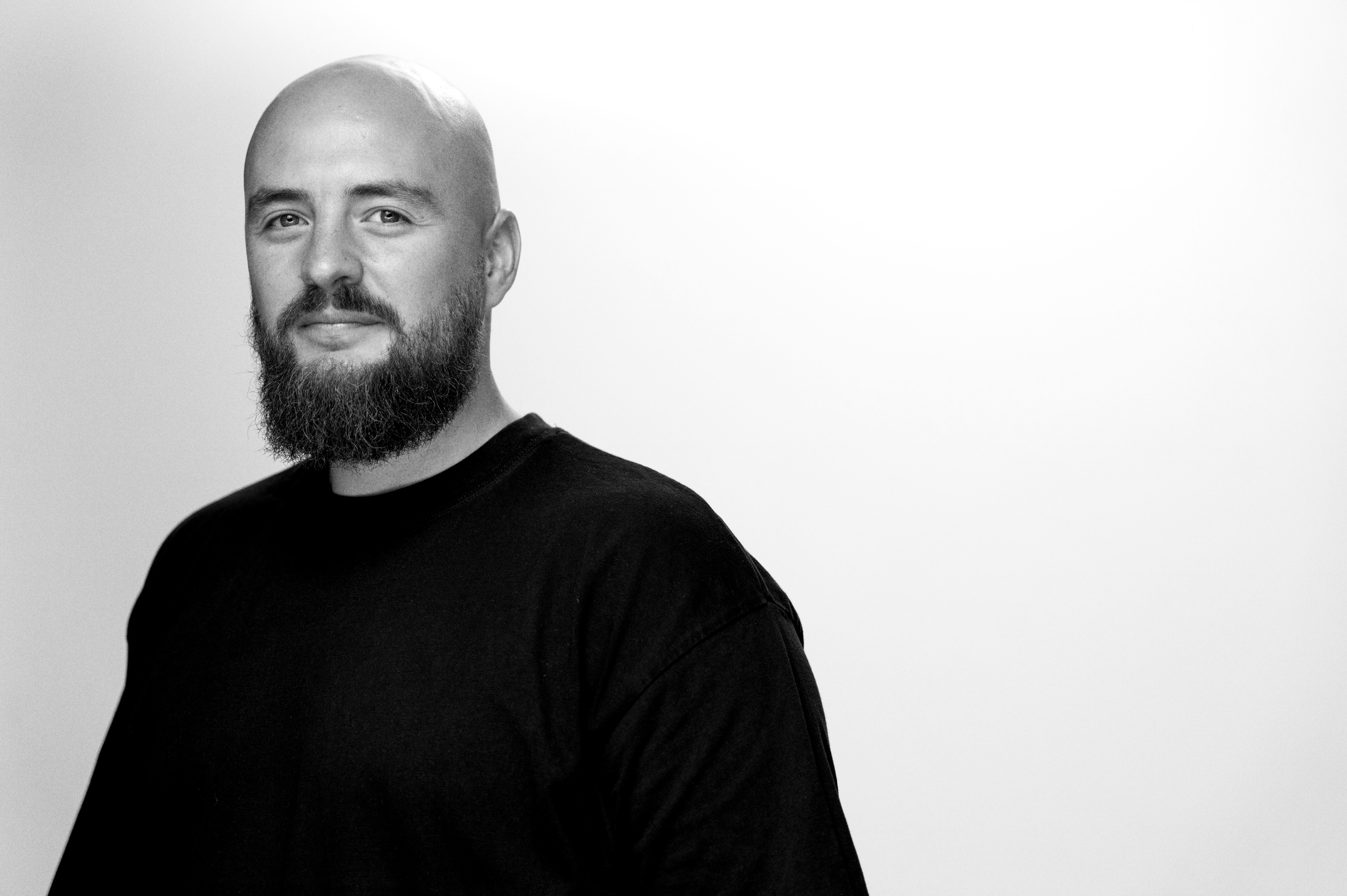
- Born: 26 October 1991 (age 34); Mykolaiv, Ukraine
- Education: Admiral Makarov National University of Shipbuilding, Kharkiv State Academy of Culture
- Occupations: Photographer, teacher, curator, dancer
- Website: melnitchenko.com

Serhii Melnychenko (Ukrainian: Сергій Мельниченко, born 26 October 1991, Mykolaiv, Ukraine) is a Ukrainian photographer, teacher, curator, dancer, master of sports of the international class in ballroom dances (2005). Founder of the school of conceptual and art photography MYPH (2018). Member of the creative association Ukrainian Photographic Alternative (2012), Ukrainian Association of Professional Photographers.

In 2017, he became the first Ukrainian to receive the German Leica Oskar Barnack Award Newcomer.

== Biography ==
Since his teenage years, he has been performing abroad, in particular in China.

In 2014, graduated from the Admiral Makarov National University of Shipbuilding with a specialization — computer systems engineer.

With the beginning of the full-scale Russian invasion of Ukraine in 2022, he began volunteering.

In 2025, he obtained his second higher education degree, receiving a master's degree in culture and arts with a specialization in "Audiovisual Arts and Production" from the Kharkiv State Academy of Culture.

== Creativity ==
Started photography in 2009.

In 2012, he rethought his own approach to artistic practice after communicating with Roman Piatkovka, a representative of the Kharkiv School of Photography.

In 2018, at the age of 26, he founded the MYPH (Mykolaiv Young Photography) School of Conceptual and Art Photography, which has since evolved into a dynamic platform that brings together a photography school, an artist community, a gallery, an agency, a publishing house, the magazine "525 by MYPH", and the MYPH Photography Prize.

Author of the series Schwarzenegger is my idol (2012, 2020; book of the same name published), Polaroids from China (2015), From Dusk till Dawn (2015—2017, 2018; a book of the same name was published), Passengers (2017), Young and Free (2017—2021), Fundamental Space Explorations of Naked Singularity (2019—2021) and others.

During his creative career, Melnychenko has participated in over 200 solo and group exhibitions, fairs, and international festivals. He is the author of 14 photo books, published both independently and in collaboration with the MYPH platform. As a curator and organizer, he has implemented over 60 exhibition projects in various countries, aimed at presenting the works of MYPH school students.

From 2022 to 2023, two series of Melnychenko's works were added to the collection of the German foundation Alexander Tutsek-Stiftung in Munich. In the foundation's collection, his works are displayed alongside those of artists such as Robert Rauschenberg, Ai Weiwei, Nen Goldin, Zhen Khan, Thomas Struth, Sebastião Salgado, Nadav Kander, Luo Yang, and Pixie Liao.

Photos are published in The Independent Photographer, Fisheye Magazine.

Works are presented in private and public collections in the US, Hong Kong, Ukraine, Poland, France, Germany, Belgium, Russia, Lithuania, Czech Republic, Japan, Netherlands, Italy, Switzerland etc. In 2024, his series "Tattoos of War" was added to the permanent collection of the Kiyosato Museum of Photography (K*MoPA) in Japan.

== Awards ==
- 2026 — Nominator of Leica Oskar Barnack Award;
- 2025 — Nominator of Leica Oskar Barnack Award;
- 2024 — inclusion in the permanent collection of the Kiyosato Museum of Photographic Arts (K*MoPA) — Kiyosato, Japan;
- 2024 — Annual photography grant from the Alexander-Tutsek Stiftung to create my own project — Munich, Germany;
- 2023 — nomination for "A New Gaze 4", Vontobel Contemporary Photography Sponsorship Prize — Zurich, Switzerland;
- 2013 – Winner Of Contest Photographer Of The Year 2012 In Nomination Series Of The Year (Fine Art) – Kyiv, Ukraine
- 2013 – International Contest Golden Camera 2012 – 1st Place In Nomination Conceptual Photography, Amateur – Kyiv, Ukraine
- 2013 – Shortlist Of Krakow Photomonth Festival – Krakow, Poland
- 2015 – Short-List Of Pinchuk Art Centre Prize – Kyiv, Ukraine
- 2017 – 1st Place In The National Awards Photographer Of The Year 2016, Street Professional Category – Kyiv, Ukraine
- 2017 – Winner Of Leica Oskar Barnack Newcomer Award 2017 – Berlin, Germany
- 2020 – Nomination on Foam Paul Huf Award – Amsterdam, Netherlands
- 2022 – Becoming a part of Alexander Tutsek-Stiftung foundation collection – Münich, Germany
- 2022 – FUTURES talent, nominated by ISSP (Riga, Latvia) – Amsterdam, Netherlands
- 2023 – Nomination on Foam Paul Huf Award – Amsterdam, Netherlands

=== Public awards ===
- 2023 — Honorary breastplate "For Assistance to the Armed Forces" from the Commander-in-Chief of the Armed Forces of Ukraine Valerii Zaluzhny,
- 2024 — Medal "For Cooperation" from the Head of the State Border Service of Ukraine.

== Exhibitions ==
=== Personal exhibitions ===
- 2012 – Nails – Kryvyi Rih, Ukraine
- 2013 – Schwarzenegger Is My Idol – Lviv, Ukraine
- 2013 – Schwarzenegger Is My Idol – Showoff Section Of Krakow Photomonth Festival – Krakow, Poland
- 2014 – Les Amours Imaginaries, Closer – Kyiv, Ukraine
- 2014 – Les Amours Imaginaries Odesa Museum Of Modern Art Arteria– Odesa, Ukraine
- 2014 – Schwarzenegger Is My Idol, Fiebre Galería – Buenos Aires, Argentina
- 2014 – Art-Book Presentation In Frames Of Private Residency Program The Muzychi Expanded History Project – Kyiv, Ukraine
- 2014 – Schwarzenegger Is My Idol In Frames Of Off_Festival Bratislava 2014 – Bratislava, Slovakia
- 2014 – Military Commissariat, Estudio Ñ – Valdivia, Chile
- 2015 – Les Amours Imaginaries In Frames Of Landskrona Fotofestival – Landskrona, Sweden
- 2017 – Behind The Scenes, Trzecie Oko Gallery – Krakow, Poland
- 2017 – Behind The Scenes – Mykolaiv, Ukraine
- 2017 – Paris Photo 2017, Behind The Scenes/Leica Oskar Barnack Award 2017 – Paris, France
- 2017 – PLAYDAY, Face Foundation/Mironova Gallery – Kyiv, Ukraine
- 2018 – Behind The Scenes, Claude Samuel Gallery – Paris, France
- 2018 – Sztuka w dialogu, Loneliness online and Polaroids from China, Piekno Panie Gallery – Lublin, Poland
- 2018 – Loneliness online, SomoS Art Gallery – Berlin, Germany
- 2018 – Only Now Only Never, FACE Foundation – Kyiv, Ukraine
- 2018 – Behind the scenes, European Month of Photography, Galéria Michalský dvor – Bratislava, Slovakia
- 2019 – Leica Gallery London – London, UK
- 2019 – Schwarzenegger is my idol, Museum of Kharkiv School of Photography – Kharkiv, Ukraine
- 2019 – From Dusk Till Dawn, f22 foto space – Hong Kong
- 2020 – Young and free, Leica 6×7 Gallery, curator Adam Mazur – Warsaw, Poland
- 2021 – Fundamental Space Explorations of Naked Singularity – Vasli Souza Gallery, Oslo, Norway
- 2022 – Young and free? / Metaheroes – Esther Okada Gallery, Tokyo, Japan
- 2022 – Fundamental Space Explorations of Naked Singularity, The Great Finding. Step One – Subject. With Mitya Fenechkin – Asortymentna kimnata gallery, Ivano-Frankivsk, Ukraine
- 2023 — So much Love and Compassion, Alexander Tutsek-Stiftung Foundation – München, Germany
- 2023 — Fundamental Space Explorations of Naked Singularity, The Great Finding. Step Three. With Mitya Fenechkin - Dymchuk Gallery, Kyiv, Ukraine
- 2025 — Tattoos of war - in frames of Budapest Photo Festival, 37 Gallery - Budapest, Hungary
- 2025 — Fundamental Space Explorations of Naked Singularity, The Great Finding. Step Four. With Mitya Fenechkin - Porokhova Vezha, Lviv, Ukraine
- 2025 — The war they live - Ukrainian House of America - New York, USA.
