= Andrii Dubchak =

Ukrainian photographer, videographer, photojournalist, war correspondent

- Андрій Дубчак
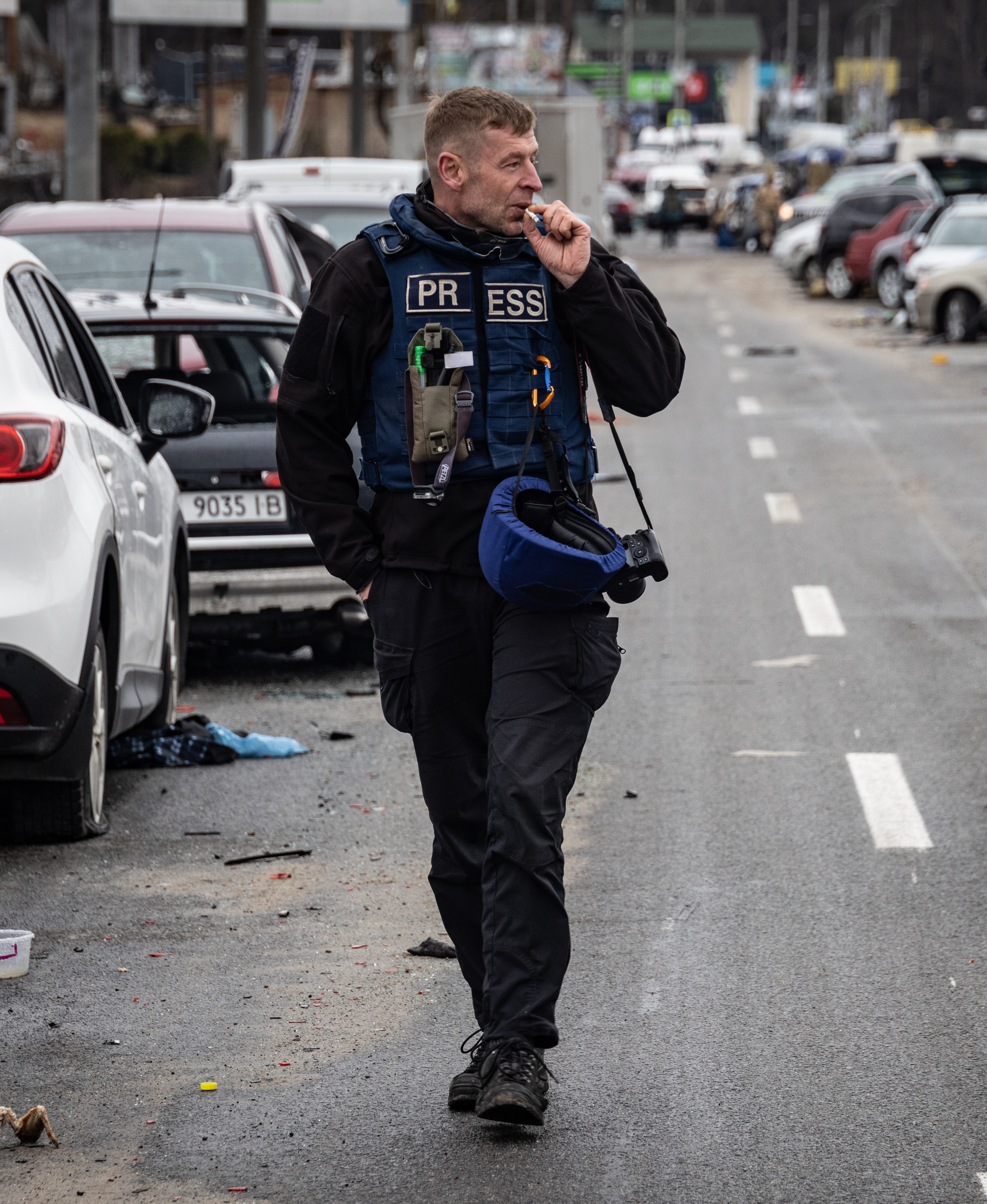
- Born: 19 October 1976 (age 49); Kalynivka, Vinnytsia Oblast
- Education: Vinnytsia National Agrarian University, Igor Sikorsky Kyiv Polytechnic Institute, National University of Kyiv-Mohyla Academy

Andrii Ivanovych Dubchak (Ukrainian: Андрій Іванович Дубчак, born 19 October 1976, Kalynivka, Vinnytsia Oblast) is a Ukrainian photographer, videographer, photojournalist, and war correspondent. Dubchak is the founder and director of the independent reporting media outlet Frontliner.

Dubchak was one of the first streamers of Euromaidan, having filmed the main events of the Revolution of Dignity, including the clashes on 17–20 February 2014. He has been covering the Russian-Ukrainian war since 2015.

The reports by Andrii Dubchak have been published and streamed by numerous media worldwide, including CNN, BBC, The New York Times, The Washington Post, and others. He is an honorable member of the Ukrainian Association of Professional Photographers.

== Biography ==
=== Education ===
Dubchak graduated from the Faculty of Mechanics at Vinnytsia National Agrarian University, the Faculty of Informatics and Computer Science at the National Technical University of Ukraine "Igor Sikorsky Kyiv Polytechnic Institute". He is also an alumnus of the Digital Future Journalism program at the Kyiv Mohyla Academy School of Journalism.

Dubchak is a participant in a series of courses run by the Kyiv School of Photography.

=== Career ===
From 2003 to 2021, Dubchak worked for Radio Svoboda as the website editor and in multimedia, SEO, and photographer. He covered the events during the annexation of Crimea.

As the first streamer of the Euromaidan, he filmed and streamed many events of the Revolution of Dignity, including the clashes on 18–20 February 2014. He filmed the video "A Million's March" on 1 December 2013. Equipped with a GoPro camera, Dubchak climbed to the top of the then President Yanukovych’s ‘yolka’, a public Christmas tree, and filmed the Euromaidan protest march. In 2014, Andrii Dubchak received an international award, the Lovie Award, in the Internet Video category for this video.

He took up photography in 2015. Since then, he has regularly reported from the front line and covered the Russian invasion of Ukraine. Dubchak was one of the first journalists to document Russian war crimes against civilians in Ukraine, including the murder of a family on a bridge in Irpin on 6 March 2022.

In 2021, he launched his own project, Donbas Frontliner, which then was renamed to Frontliner and has grown into a bilingual media outlet with an audience of millions. He is currently its chief reporter and media director.

Andrii Dubchak collaborates with international media, in particular, NYT, Zeit, Helsigin Sanomat, Voice of America and many others. His materials have also been published in Ukrainian media, including Reporters, Radio Svododa, Espreso TV.

== Filmography ==
Dubchak was a co-producer of Winter on Fire: Ukraine's Fight for Freedom, a film nominated for 2016 Oscar’s Best Documentary Feature, and Freedom on Fire: Ukraine's Fight for Freedom directed by Evgeny Afineevsky. He is also the co-producer of Ukraine Under Attack: 72 Hours in the Presidential Office.

He is currently working on several documentaries that will be available for both Ukrainian and international audiences.

== Awards ==
- Winner of the Lovie Award in the Internet Video category for his video shot from the top of the Christmas tree (2014)
- Shortlisted for European Digital Media Award 2019 as Best in Audience Engagement
- The Sixth International LifePressPhoto-2020 Reporting Contest: a gold medal in the nomination "Breaking News / Single Photo" and a diploma of the National Society of Photo Artists of Ukraine in the nomination "Breaking News / Photo Essay; Series of Photos"
- Gold medal in the nomination "Series of Photos" for his Donbas Frontline series. Open International ART PRESS PHOTO 2021 Reporting Contest / National Society of Photo Artists of Ukraine
- Order of Merit, 3rd class (6 June 2022)
- Free Media Award 2022: photo and video correspondent Andrii Dubchak received Free Media Award for his brave, professional reports from the war zone
- An award of the Ministry of Defence of Ukraine: Medal for Assistance to the Armed Forces of Ukraine 2023
- Shortlisted for the 2023 George Gongadze Prize

== Exhibitions ==
- 2021: 13 Angles of War, a photo exhibition dedicated to the defenders of Ukraine. Kyiv, Ukraine
- 2022: The group exhibition "Ukraine Now: Darkness vs Light. Children Dream about Peace" at the Embassy of Ukraine in the Republic of India
- 2022: The Russian War Crimes House project was first presented at the Annual Meeting of the World Economic Forum (WEF) in Davos and later in Kyiv, Brussels, New York, London, and Munich
- 2023: Group exhibition of members of the Ukrainian Association of Professional Photographers "Bojují i za nás" ("They are fighting for us, too"), Cheb (Czech Republic)
- 2023: Group exhibition at the photo festival "Lens op de Mens" ("Lens on the Humans"). Pelt, Belgium.
- 2023: The Faces of Genocide. A retrospective on the tragedy from World War II to the present day. Kyiv, Ukraine.
