= Alina Smutko =

Ukrainian photographer and photojournalist

- Аліна Смутко
- Born: 1992 (age 33–34)
- Education: Poltava V.G. Korolenko National Pedagogical University, Ukrainian Catholic University

Alina Viktorivna Smutko (Ukrainian: Аліна Вікторівна Смутко, born 1992) is a Ukrainian documentary photographer and photojournalist.

== Biography ==
She graduated from the Faculty of Philology and Journalism of Poltava V.G. Korolenko National Pedagogical University (2014, bachelor's degree), and the School of Journalism and Communications of the Ukrainian Catholic University (2016, master's degree).

In 2016–2019, she was in the occupied Crimea as a freelance reporter for the Ukrainian bureau of Radio Liberty/Radio Free Europe. In 2019, Russia declared her persona non grata for her professional activities and banned her from entering Crimea and Russia for ten years.

During 2021–2023, she worked in the Suspilne Novyny team. She covered events in Donetsk and Luhansk Oblast, Transnistria, Abkhazia and Nagorno-Karabakh. Her work has been published on Hromadske, Focus, Deutsche Welle, BBC, Radio Liberty, The New York Times, The Telegraph, Politico, Der Spiegel, National Geographic, The Independent, The Guardian, Reuters.

Since 2013, she has been working with Reuters. She is the author of illustrations and several book covers, including those of Choven Publishing House.

== Exhibitions ==
=== Solo exhibitions ===
- 2017 – "The Island C" in Crimean House, Kyiv, Ukraine
- 2019 – "The Island C" on Koktebel Jazz Fest 2019, Kyiv, Ukraine
- 2020 – the exhibition with the LaVita Palliative Care Fund, Kyiv, Ukraine
- 2022 – "New hybrid deportation" in La Chambre, Strasbourg, France
- 2022 – "New Hybrid Deportation" under the auspices of Graph CMI Association, Bram, France

=== Group exhibitions ===
- 2015 – the exhibition of The Day newspaper photo contest, Kyiv, Ukraine
- 2019 – "The Dream About White Socks" on Nikon Photo Contest 2019 exhibition, Tokyo, Japan
- 2020 – the exhibition "Human Rights Situation in Crimea" at the Globsec Security Forum, Bratislava, Slovakia
- 2022 – "New hybrid deportation" at the First Parliamentary Summit of the Crimean Platform, Zagreb, Croatia
- 2022 – the exhibition at The CinEast Festival, Luxembourg City, Luxembourg
- 2022 - "New hybrid deportation" on The Fotofestiwal Łodz, Lodz, Poland
- 2022 - the exhibition of La-Presse.org in Leipzig, Germany
- 2022 – the exhibition at the Reynolds Journalism Institute at the University of Missouri, Columbia, USA
- 2022 – the screening at Centro de Fotografía de Montevideo, Montevideo, Uruguay
- 2022 – the screening of Georgian and Ukrainian war photography by Tbilisi Photo Festival, Tbilisi, Georgia
- 2022 – the exhibition Shoulder To Shoulder: Ukrainian War Photography in public places in Odesa, Ukraine
- 2022 – the screening of female Ukrainian photographers at the Sune Jonsson Centrum for dokumentarfotografi, Umea, Sweden
- 2022 – "The Thin Line" at Safehouse 2 in Peckham, London, UK
- 2022 – the exhibition "The Thin Line" and screening of War Photography in Montpellier, France
- 2022 – "The Thin Line" in Ottensheim, Austria
- 2022 – the screening at The Bayeux Award festival, Bayeux, France
- 2022 – "Focus on Ukraine", Hoorn, The Netherlands
- 2022 – the exhibition at the Estacao Imagem festival, Coimbra, Portugal
- 2022 - “The New Abnormal” at PHOXXI, the temporary House of Photography of Deichtorhallen Hamburg, Hamburg, Germany
- 2022 – "The Thin Line" at The Copenhagen Photo Festival, Copenhagen, Denmark
- 2022 – the exhibition in VEMU Estonian Museum, Toronto, Canada
- 2022 – the exhibition in OKAPI Galerii, Tallinn, Estonia

== Awards ==
- 2015 – the photo contest of The Day newspaper, Kyiv, Ukraine (shortlist)
- 2019 – one of the «12 RFE/RL Women Who Make Headlines», Prague, Czech Republic
- 2019 – Corporate Photo Contest RFE/RL, Prague, Czech Republic (winner)
- 2019 – Nikon Photo Contest 2019, Tokyo, Japan (silver prize)
