= Photography in Ukraine =

Photography, as a branch of science, technology and art, developed in Ukraine in different ways, as historically lands were divided between two empires: Russia and Austria. This has led to some differences in the goals of photographic societies and in the technological and social role of photography in Ukraine.

== General information ==
The chemical principles of photography were discovered in the first half of the 18th century, when the effect of light sensitivity of silver salts was discovered and proved. Over the next century, knowledge in the field of chemistry was constantly improved, as well as technical aspects of exposure to light-sensitive substances and long-term fixation of the obtained images.

In Ukraine, photography as a form of art and a field of technology came from two directions: in the western lands—from Austria-Hungary, and in the eastern—from the rest of the world, including Eastern Europe.

== The first traces of photography in Ukraine ==
Photography was brought to Ukraine in the 1840s by foreign photographers, participants in the annual international fairs in Kyiv—"Kontrakts", who often remained in Ukraine. The first settler photographers were the Frenchmen "Jacques" and Charles-Paul Herbst.

The pioneers of Ukrainian photography in the Western Ukrainian Lands in the second half of the 19th century were A. Karpiuk, Volodymyr Shukhevych in Lviv, Stepan Dmokhovsky, and Y. Lyubovych in Przemyśl, and F. Velychko in Stanyslaviv.

== The period of development (1850–1915) ==
=== Eastern lands of Ukraine ===
In the 1850s, there already were local photographers in Kyiv including I. Chekhovych, Ivan Hudovsky, Fedir Levdyk, K. Voyutky (photographed the coffin of T. Shevchenko), M. Gross, Yank, and others. From 1864, M. Benzeman, Franz de Meser, the author of landscapes of Kyiv in the 1860s and 1880s, Josyp Kordysh (1868), M. Pasternak (1869) and others had photo studios.

In the 1860s and 1890s, professional photo studios opened up in Odesa, Kharkiv, Poltava, and other big cities. One of the first Ukrainian photographers, Wlodzimierz (Volodymyr) Vysotsky, opened a photo studio in Kyiv in 1871, where a well-known Ukrainian photographer and cinematographer, Alfred Fedetsky, worked from 1880 to 1886.

The most famous photographers-artists of that time in Odesa were Philip Haas, Michri, Fedorovets, Khloponin and K. Migursky. From June 1886, Fedetsky, the founder of cinematography in Ukraine and tri-color photography, worked in Kharkiv, and was honored at foreign exhibitions for artistic portraits and landscapes. From the 1880s such artists as O. Suchkova, G. Serebrin, V. Tymoshenko, R. Tuken and others were gaining popularity.

In Poltava in the 1880s worked J. Khmelevsky, author of an album of photographs from places associated with the life of Mykolai Gogol, photographs from the opening of the monument of Ivan Kotliarevsky (1903) and a large series of photographs of the house of Poltava Zemstvo (1908 - 1909).

Until 1914 there were many photographers-artists and professional scientists in Kyiv. Some of them include Arshenevsky, M. Bobyr, I. Haas, A. Hubchevsky, I. Yezersky, K. Parchevsky, M. Shukin and V. Favorsky, a researcher of microphotography.

At the end of the 19th century, photo organizations appeared as branches of the Imperial Russian Technical Society in Kharkiv (1891), Odesa (1897) and Kyiv (1899), as well as the Society of Art Amateurs in Odesa, Kharkiv (1891), Simferopil' (1896), Yelisavetgrad (1901) and the most active society of all-Ukrainian ones "Daher" in Kyiv (1901–1917). The latter organized reports, excursions and competitions. In 1908 it organized the All-Ukrainian Congress of Photographers and the International Exhibition of Art Photography in Kyiv.

Commercial photography spread after the invention of bromogelatin plates by the Englishman R. Maddox (1871). By 1914, about 70 commercial photographers worked in Kyiv itself (about 40 in Odesa). There were 6 shops with photo accessories in Kyiv (including I. Konosevych's "Ukrainian Photo Shop"); there existed also courses on practical photography of Bernadsky.

=== Western lands of Ukraine ===
The organization of amateur photographers was established at the Ukrainian Sich Riflemen's Press Apartment at the end of 1914 in the Carpathians. The first photographs "in the field" were taken by Ivan Ivanets, Y. Butsmanyuk, B. Hnatevych, V. Klim, T. Moiseevych, M. Uhryn-Bezgrishny, T. Yatsura and others.

In 1915, at the Ukrainian Sich Riflement's Press Apartment, V. Bobynsky and Lev Getz compiled the collection "Rifleman's Anthology", which contained 36 works illustrated with 144 photographs by military photographers. Amateur groups also operated in internment camps in Czechoslovakia in Liberec (1920).

== Interwar period (1920–1939) ==
=== Western lands ===
In the 1920s, the following appeared in Lviv:

- Photographic section at Sokol association;
- Sub-abstract of photographs;
- Section of photography at the Society of Technical Students "Osnova".

In 1930, the Ukrainian Photographic Society (UPS) was established in Lviv (initiated by Professor Oleksa Balytsky and Dr. Stepan Dmokhovsky, chairman of the society) with branches in Stanislaviv, Ternopil and Rohatyn. The society had 216 members (1936), its own home and library. In 1933-39 it published the magazine "Svitlo i Tin" [Light and Shadow] (its editors-in-chief were Oleksandr Mokh and Stepan Shchurat). The UPS also organized monthly domestic exhibitions and annual representative ones.

The members of the society took part in exhibitions in Chicago (1933), the All-Slavic Art Photo Exhibition in Zagreb (1935) and in the photo competitions Alpha, Perutz, Kodak, Phillips and Hérault.

In 1935, together with the Plai Tourist and Local History Society the aforementioned association organized the exhibition "Our Motherland in the Photo" with 68 participants.

Prominent members of the society included Professor Oleksa Balytsky, Julian Dorosh (author of the books "Amateur Textbook" (1931) and "Magnification"), Olexandr Pezhansky, Yaroslav Savka, Volodymyr Savitsky, Danylo Figol, Roman Masliak, Volodymyr Tarnavsky.

L. Yanushevych and J. Shalabavka were engaged in commercial photography in Lviv.

=== Eastern lands ===
After the revolution, in the 1920s and 1930s, and after the Second World War, amateur photography groups spread in Ukraine in different institutions, public organizations, and factories. They periodically organized photo and travelling exhibitions outside Ukraine and competitions with cash prizes in all regional centers.

Photojournalists for the press were recruited from the participants of those exhibitions. For a short time, the magazines "Foto-Kino [Photo-Cinema]" (1924), "Foto dlia vsikh [Photo for Everyone]" (1928–1930), and "Foto sotsbudivnytstvu [Photo for Social Construction]" (1932–1934) appeared in Kharkiv.

In the 1920s and 1930s, laboratory technicians and photographers prepared art and industrial schools; artistic Photography was taught at the Kyiv Art Institute and the Kyiv Institute of Cinematography. The most famous artists-photographers of that time were students of M. Petrov—D. Demutsky and P. Novitsky, who worked as cinematographers in feature films; I. Ezersky, Ozerov, O. Dmytriev—as portraitists.

After the war, photography was taught at the Faculty of Cinematography of Karpenko-Karyi Kyiv Theater Institute; photography technique was trained at the Lviv Polygraphic Institute. For the needs of consumer services, in large cities there were photography courses, which produced photographers-technicians. An experimental photo studio was being set up at the Ministry of Culture in Kyiv.

== Photography in the Soviet Union ==
In 1971, photographer Iryna Pap established a school of photography at the Union of Journalists of Ukraine. The school held lectures, workshops and portfolio reviews. It was not an official educational institution, but many professionals, who later formed the photographic environment of independent Ukraine (Viktor Marushchenko, Valery Kerekesh, Serhiy Pozharsky) graduated from it.

Also, one of the most famous photographers of the USSR was Mykolai Kozlovsky. From 1948 he worked as a special photojournalist for Ogoniok magazine. Among his creative works there are more than 30 photo albums. He was also the winner of the Shevchenko National Prize in 1986 for the photo album "My Kyiv".

Some of the most influential "unofficial" photographers of the USSR are Borys Mykhailov from Kharkiv and Villa Furgalo from Lviv.

== Ukrainian photographers ==
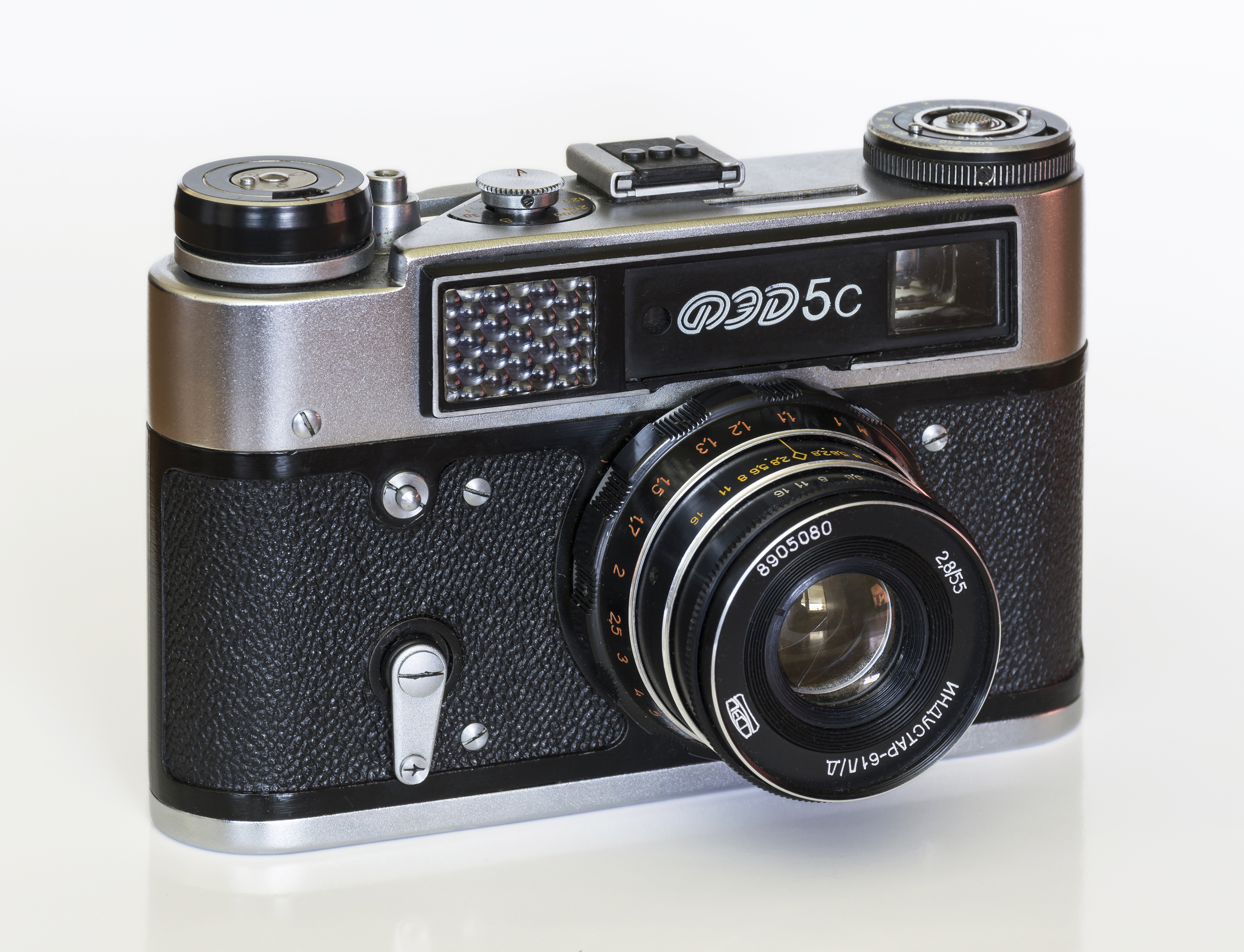
FED 5C camera

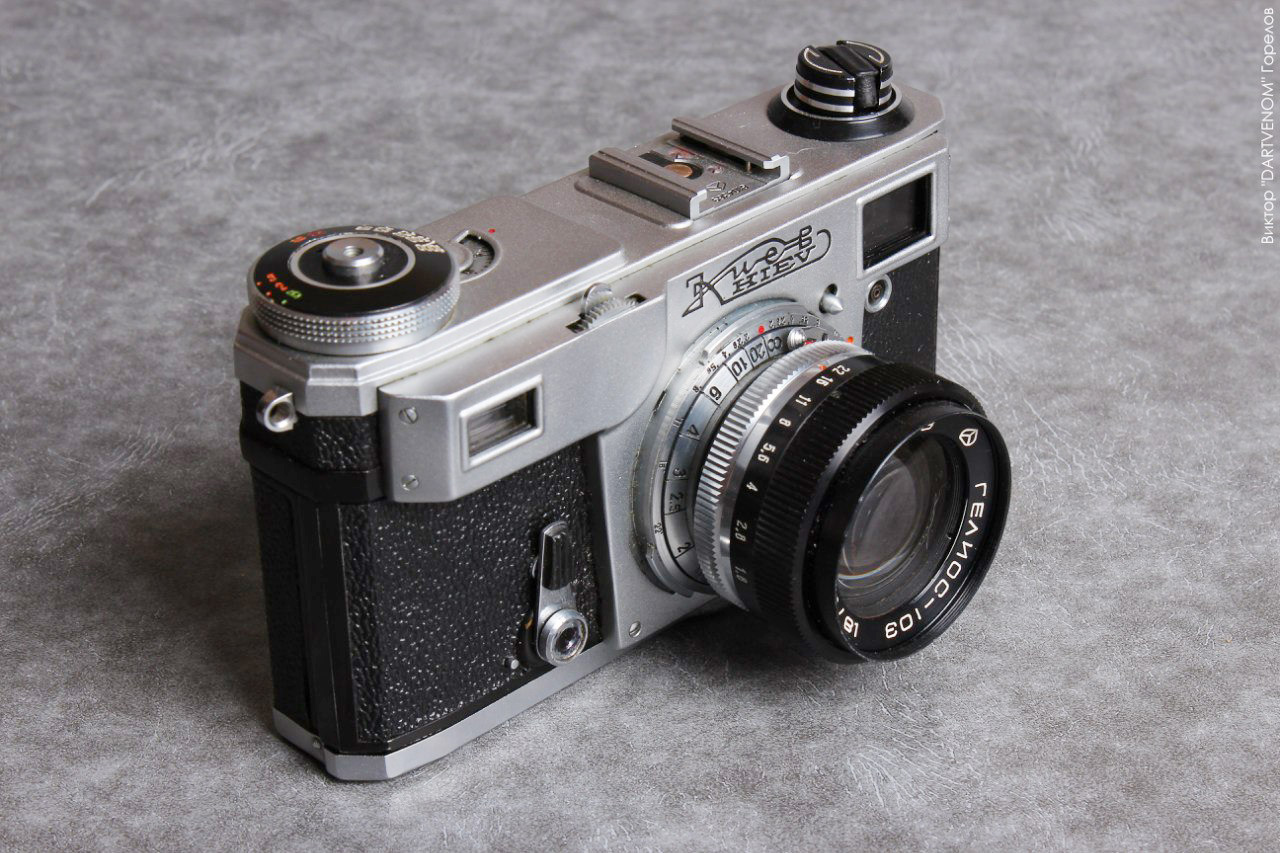
Camera "Kiev-4AM" with a lens "Helios"

Some of them include:

- Borys Andriyovych Mykhailov (from 1971).
- Oleksandr Volodymorovych Chekmenov (from 1969).
- Alfred Konstantinovich Fedetsky (1857–1902).

== Movements ==
- Kharkiv School of Photography

== See also ==
- Ukrainian photographers

== Additional references ==
- Volodchenko, Nataly (April 3, 2006). «High-tech доби кринолінів». Contracts, No. 14
- Ukrainian photography
- Ukraine. Archive of old photos on Europeana Photography
- Kubiyovych, Volodymyr (1955—1995). "Encyclopedia of Ukrainian studies". New York: Young Life.
- Synelnikov, Alexander (2012). "Photography." Odesa: Astroprint. P. 144. ISBN 978-966-190-646-3
- Pylypiuk, Vasyl (2011). "Ukrainian art photography: stages of formation and artistic principles of development". Lviv: Svit. PP. 173–175. ISBN 978-966-603-500-7
