= List of villages in Mykolaiv Oblast =

This is a list of villages in the Mykolaiv Oblast of Ukraine, categorised by Raion.

== Bashtanka Raion ==
- Barativka
- Bezimenne
- Lyubomyrivka, Bereznehuvate settlement hromada
- Lyubomyrivka, Kazanka settlement hromada
- Novopetrivka
- Novopoltavka
- Oleksandrivka
- Partyzanske
- Romanivka
- Vynohradivka

== Mykolaiv Oblast ==
- Bilozerka
- Blahodatne
- Komisarivka
- Krasnopillia
- Luch
- Lupareve
- Maksymivka
- Mykhailo-Laryne
- Novomykolaivka
- Parutyne
- Pokrovka
- Pokrovske
- Shevchenkove
- Shyrokolanivka
- Stepove
- Sulz
- Ternovi Pody
- Tsentralne
- Ukrainka
- Ukrainka
- Vasylivka

== Pervomaisk Raion ==
- Lysa Hora

== Voznesensk Raion ==
- Hradivka
- Mykolaivka
- Novosvitlivka
- Volodymrivka
- Volodymrivka
