= Russian occupation of Mykolaiv Oblast =

Military occupation and annexation by Russia

- Part of the Russo-Ukrainian war (2022–present)
- Commanded by: Yuriy Barbashov (until 10 November 2022)
- Target: Mykolaiv Oblast
- Date: 24 February 2022
- Executed by: Russian Ground Forces

Parts of Ukraine's Mykolaiv Oblast came under military occupation by Russian forces as part of the Russian invasion of Ukraine.

By March 2022, after unsuccessfully attempting to take Voznesensk and capture Mykolaiv, Russian forces were pushed back to the southeastern part of the oblast.

On 21 September 2022, it was reported that the Russian-occupied areas of Mykolaiv Oblast would be incorporated into the Russian administration for the Kherson Oblast. Russia annexed the Kherson Oblast nine days later.

On 10 November 2022, Ukrainian forces liberated Snihurivka, the only Russian-held city in the oblast, amid a complete Russian withdrawal from areas on the right bank of the Dnieper River. The next day, local Ukrainian officials claimed that the entire Mykolaiv Oblast had been liberated except for the Kinburn Peninsula.

== Occupation ==
=== Russian occupation regime ===
Shortly after invading Ukraine, Russian forces occupied the town of Snihurivka, which is approximately 60 km (37.3 miles) from the regional capital of Mykolaiv. Russian forces also occupied surrounding towns near the border with Kherson Oblast, as well as several villages (Pokrovka, Pokrovske and Vasylivka) in the Biloberezhia Sviatoslava National Park.

In late April, Russian forces prepared a referendum to integrate occupied areas into the Republic of Crimea as well as appoint a governor for the areas. Russian passports and rubles were said to be issued and given out by September 1, and had already been issued and given out in Kherson and Zaporizhzhia administrations.

On 27 June 2022, the Security Service of Ukraine claimed to have detained a former deputy of the Mykolaiv City Council who was collaborating with Russian forces in Mykolaiv Oblast. He was a supporter of the separation of Mykolaiv Oblast from Ukraine and the creation of a Russian-backed separatist enclave called the "Mykolaiv People's Republic". He reportedly leaked information about the Armed Forces of Ukraine in hopes of obtaining an executive position in the occupying administration. The plan was for the separatist enclave to exist until the end of the war in Ukraine, at which point it would be annexed to Russia. The Russians had allegedly also promised the collaborator an executive position in the "MPR" administration as a reward for his work if they managed to occupy the region.

The administration was officially established on 13 August 2022.

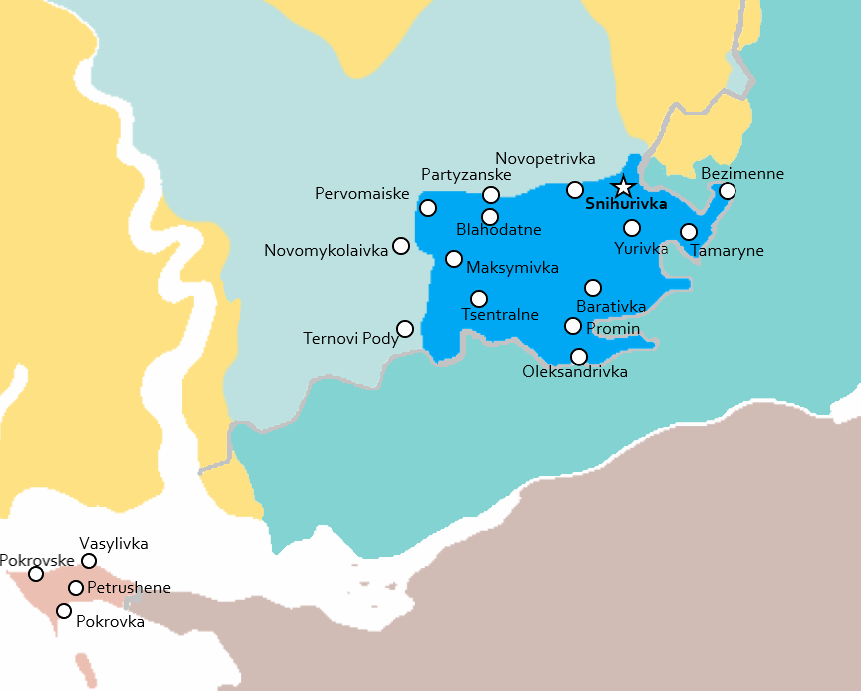
Map showing the Russian-held areas in Mykolaiv Oblast during most of 2022. The area in dark blue was liberated in November 2022.

On 2 September, Russian forces captured the settlement of Pervomaiske. The settlement of Partyzanske remained contested.

On 21 September, it was announced that the area surrounding Snihurivka as well as the outer portion of the Kinburn Peninsula, which constituted the parts of Mykolaiv Oblast that were under Russian control at the time, would be incorporated into Russia's administration in Kherson Oblast. These areas would eventually be annexed by Russia on 30 September.

=== Russian annexation ===
On 8 August 2022, Ekaterina Gubareva, deputy head of the Kherson Civilian-Military Administration announced the annexation of occupied territories of Mykolaiv Oblast. She also claimed that in some occupied towns, Russian mobile communications have begun to work. According to her, such a decision was made in order to provide the population with social payments in the "liberated" territories, as well as to establish mobile communications and television broadcasting.

On 13 August 2022, an article published by Tass, claimed that Yuriy Barbashov, governor of occupied territories claimed that a referendum in Snihurivka would take place to join Russia. The referendum would be aligned as the one in the Kherson Oblast.

On 11 September, following a major Ukrainian counteroffensive in Kharkiv Oblast, it was announced that the proposed annexation referendums would be "indefinitely" postponed.

On 30 September, Russia officially annexed the Kherson, Zaporizhzhia, Luhansk and Donetsk Oblasts. The occupied areas of the Mykolaiv Oblast including Snihurivka and Oleksandrivka were streamlined into the Kherson Oblast claimed by Russia. The United Nations General Assembly subsequently passed a resolution calling on countries not to recognise what it described as an "attempted illegal annexation" and demanded that Russia "immediately, completely and unconditionally withdraw".

=== Ukrainian counteroffensive ===
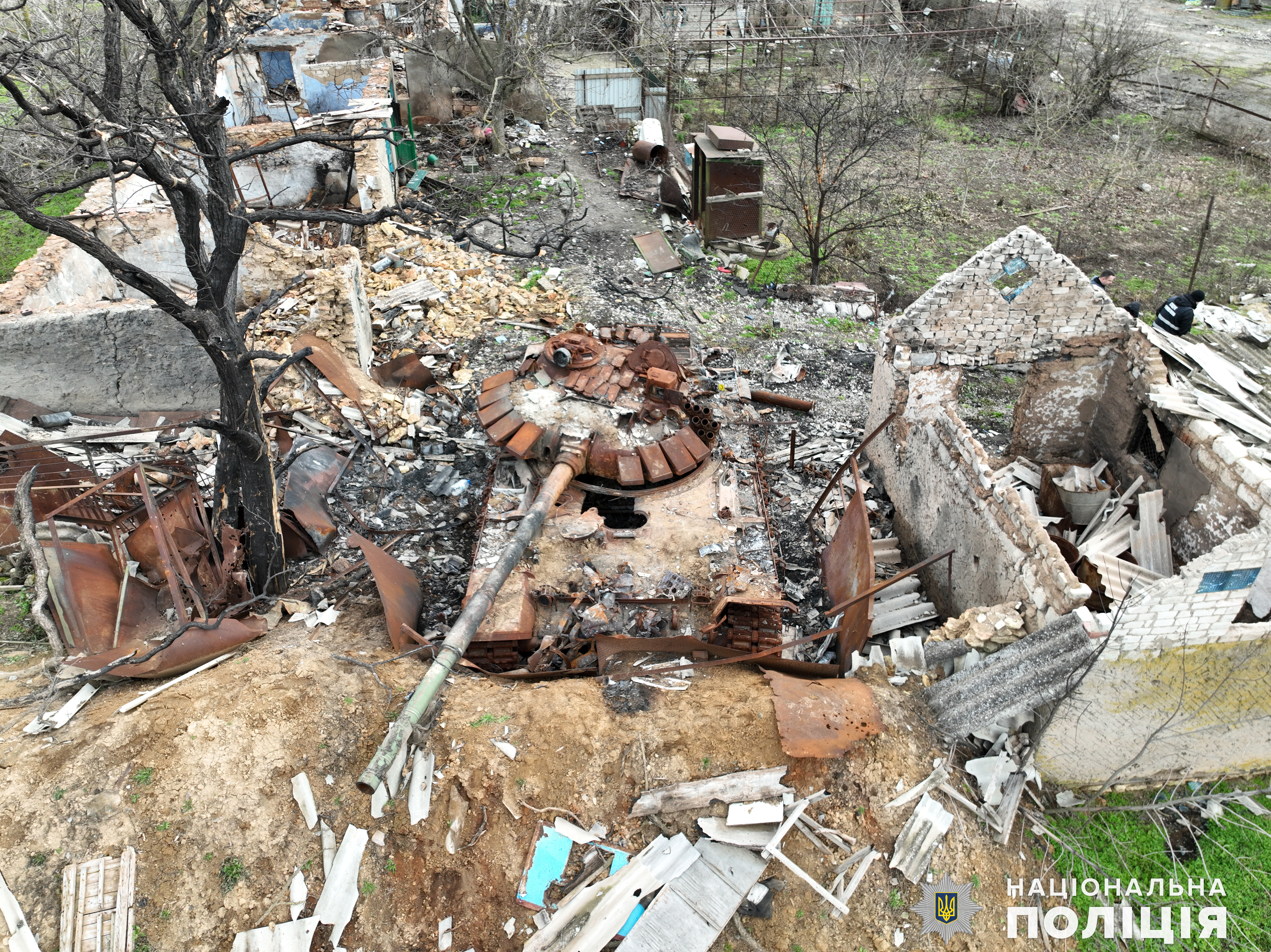
Aftermath of the occupation in Maksymivka

Amid the Russian withdrawal across the Dnieper River, it was reported that Russian troops were leaving Snihurivka and evacuating the population into Crimea and the occupied Kherson Oblast. During this time, Ukrainian forces recaptured Ternovi Pody and Liubomyrivka, west of occupied Tsentralne, after conducting several raids.

On 9 November, the Russian Defense Minister Sergei Shoigu announced the withdrawal of Russian forces from the right bank of the Dnieper River. The next day, Ukrainian forces re-entered the town of Snihurivka and raised the Ukrainian flag. A few other small settlements remained under Russian control. By 11 November Ukrainian forces had regained control of almost all of the oblast with only the outer portion of the Kinburn Peninsula remaining under Russian occupation.

=== Impact ===
The village of Maksymivka was completely destroyed.

A mass grave was found in Snihurivka with 27 dead civilians. At the same time, it was emphasized that no mass burial sites were found in the city, as in the massacre in Bucha, Kyiv oblast. All the bodies were buried in individual graves. Much of the city was damaged and destroyed. A tomato plant, built in 2018, had been bombed and destroyed using grad multiple rocket launchers.

== Control of settlements ==
Russian control of Ukraine as of 12 November 2022

Name	Pop.	Raion	Held by	As of	More information
Barativka	1,088	Bashtanka	Ukraine	11 Nov 2022	Captured by Russia on 18 March 2022. Recaptured by Ukraine in November 2022.
Kinburn Spit	Unknown	Mykolaiv	Contested	8 Jun 2026	Contested by Ukraine in June 2026.
Lupareve	1,268	Mykolaiv	Ukraine	23 Apr 2022	
Mykolaiv	476,101	Mykolaiv	Ukraine	18 Mar 2022	See Battle of Mykolaiv, Mykolaiv cluster bombing, Government building airstrike
Novomykolaivka	1,161	Mykolaiv	Ukraine	9 Jul 2022	Captured by Russia on 4 July 2022. Recaptured by Ukraine on 16 August 2022.
Novopetrivka	1,722	Bashtanka	Ukraine	11 Nov 2022	Captured by Russia on 3 March 2022. Recaptured by Ukraine on 27 April 2022. Recaptured by Russia on 23 May 2022. Recaptured by Ukraine in November 2022.
Ochakiv	13,927	Mykolaiv	Ukraine	24 Feb 2022	
Oleksandrivka	1,336	Bashtanka	Ukraine	11 Nov 2022	Captured by Russia on 11 March 2022. Recaptured by Ukraine on 11 November 2022.
Partyzanske	1,021	Bashtanka	Ukraine	11 Nov 2022	Captured by Russia on 3 March 2022. Recaptured by Ukraine in April 2022. Contested in September–November 2022.
Pervomaiske	2,698	Mykolaiv	Ukraine	11 Nov 2022	Captured by Russia on 2 September 2022. Recaptured by Ukraine in 2022.
Pokrovka	229	Mykolaiv	Russia	9 Nov 2022	Captured by Russia in 2022.
Pokrovske	181	Mykolaiv	Russia	9 Nov 2022	Captured by Russia in 2022.
Shevchenkove	3,150	Mykolaiv	Ukraine	18 Mar 2022	
Snihurivka	12,307	Bashtanka	Ukraine	9 Nov 2022	Captured by Russia on 13 March 2022. Recaptured by Ukraine on 10 November 2022.
Tsentralne	1,247	Mykolaiv	Ukraine	11 Nov 2022	Captured by Russia on 18 June 2022. Recaptured by Ukraine in November 2022.
Ukrainka	1,170	Mykolaiv	Ukraine	18 Mar 2022	
Vasylivka	382	Mykolaiv	Russia	4 Sep 2022	Captured by Russia in 2022.
Voznesensk	34,050	Voznesensk	Ukraine	14 Mar 2022	See Battle of Voznesensk
Vynohradivka	1,388	Bashtanka	Ukraine	25 Mar 2022	

== See also ==
- Outline of the Russo-Ukrainian war
- Russian-occupied territories of Ukraine (former occupation marked in italics)
  - Russian occupation of Crimea
  - Russian occupation of Chernihiv Oblast
  - Russian occupation of Donetsk Oblast
  - Russian occupation of Dnipropetrovsk Oblast
  - Russian occupation of Kharkiv Oblast
  - Russian occupation of Kherson Oblast
  - Russian occupation of Kyiv Oblast
  - Russian occupation of Luhansk Oblast
  - Russian occupation of Sumy Oblast
  - Russian occupation of Zaporizhzhia Oblast
  - Russian occupation of Zhytomyr Oblast
  - Snake Island campaign
- Annexation of Crimea by the Russian Federation
- Collaboration with Russia during the Russian invasion of Ukraine
- Russian annexation of Donetsk, Kherson, Luhansk and Zaporizhzhia oblasts
- 2022 protests in Russian-occupied Ukraine
- Ukrainian resistance during the 2022 Russian invasion of Ukraine
- War crimes in the Russian invasion of Ukraine
- Russian war crimes
