= 123rd Territorial Defense Brigade =

Ukrainian Territorial Defense Forces unit

- 123-тя окрема бригада територіальної оборони
- Active: 30 June 2018 - present
- Country: Ukraine
- Branch: Armed Forces of Ukraine
- Type: Military reserve force
- Role: Light infantry
- Part of: Territorial Defence Forces; Operational Command South
- Garrison/HQ: Mykolaiv Oblast; MUN А7052
- Engagements: Russo-Ukrainian war: Russian invasion of Ukraine; Battle of Mykolaiv

Commanders
- Current commander: Col. Roman Tokarenko

Insignia
- Flag

Soldier launching a UAV

The 123rd Territorial Defense Brigade (Ukrainian: 123-тя окрема бригада територіальної оборони) is a brigade of the Territorial Defense Forces.

== History ==
=== Formation ===
On 30 June 2018 the brigade was formed in Mykolaiv Oblast. It is part of Operational Command South. During the year 189th Battalion and brigade headquarters held a seven-day exercise which involved 612 soldiers.

From 28 August to 6 September 2019 255 soldiers from 191st Battalion were involved in an exercise. From 19 to 26 September 2020 another exercise took place, involving 532 soldiers.

=== Russo-Ukrainian War ===
Russian invasion of Ukraine

On 28 February 2022, the brigade's 186th Battalion was assigned to the defense of the South Ukraine Nuclear Power Plant.

On 1 March 2022, Russian forces advanced into the Mykolaiv Oblast. The 190th Battalion defended Bashtanka from a large column of Russian military vehicles, forcing the Russians to retreat in the direction of Yavkyne and Pisky.

During 2-3 March, the 187th Battalion took part in the battle of Voznesensk, where they lost eight soldiers.

Units of the brigade defended the city of Mykolaiv near the villages of Lymany and Halytsynove in late March 2022.

On 14 April, the 206th Battalion of Kyiv's 241st Territorial Defense Brigade was transferred to the command of the 123rd Brigade, in order to strengthen the defense of the city of Mykolaiv. The 206th's 1st Company took up the defense of the villages of Halytsynove and Prybuzke, while its 3rd Company was deployed to the southern outskirts of the city near the village of Ukraiinka.

On 28 April, the 123rd Brigade's consolidated assault company was transferred to the command of the 59th Motorized Brigade, and took part in combat operations east of Mykolaiv near the villages of Shevchenkove, Kotliareve and Zelenyi Hai. Starting on 29 June, units of the 123rd held a section of the front line near the villages of Novohryhorivka and Liubomyrivka. On 2 September, elements of the brigade's 186th Battalion were assigned to the 59th Motorized Brigade and took part in operations near the village of Ternovi Pody. On 5 September, units of the 186th were assigned to a section of the front line in the village of Novopoltavka in the Kherson Oblast.

On 14 October, the brigade received its battle flag.

In January 2023, several of the brigade's battalions took part in combat operations on Velykyi Potomkin island and Bilohrudove island in the Dnieper River delta near the city of Kherson. In June 2023, elements of the brigade's 188th Battalion repelled a Russian assault on the same islands.

On 2 October 2024, Lieutenant Colonel Ihor Hryb, the commander of the brigade's 186th Battalion died near Vuhledar. Several Ukrainian journalists claimed that the commander committed suicide after the battalion refused orders and left their positions near Vuhledar without permission. On 5 October the command of the brigade announced that the circumstances of Ihor Hryb's death are currently being investigated, and an internal investigation is underway.

On 4 October, about a hundred soldiers of the 187th Battalion of the 123rd Brigade held a rally in Voznesensk, Mykolaiv region. The soldiers were protesting to draw attention to the lack of training and weapons to participate in combat operations in the Donetsk sector. All of them refused to perform a combat mission and went AWOL. One officer of the battalion claimed that the entire brigade had no rotations in 3 years.

== Structure ==
As of 2024, the brigade's structure is as follows:

- Headquarters
- 186th Territorial Defense Battalion (Pervomaisk) MUN А7352
- 187th Territorial Defense Battalion (Voznesensk) MUN А7353
- 188th Territorial Defense Battalion (Ochakiv) MUN А7354
- 189th Territorial Defense Battalion (Mykolaiv) MUN А7355
- 190th Territorial Defense Battalion (Bashtanka) MUN А7356
- 191st Territorial Defense Battalion (Mykolaiv) MUN А7357
- 255th Territorial Defense Battalion
- Attack Drone Company "Horror from Heaven"
  - "Black Sun" Platoon
- Engineering Company
- Communication Company
- Logistics Company
- Mortar Battery

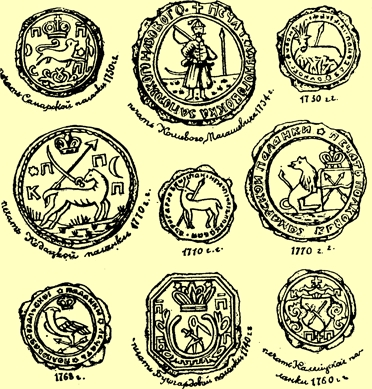
Seals of Nova Sich, with Buhohardivska Palanka seal in center.

== Commanders ==
- Colonel Herman Krauze 2018–2020
- Colonel Roman Tokarenko 2020–present

== Insignia ==
The brigade's emblem shows a silver watchful deer with gold antlers, holding a spear. In Cossack times, this image was used as a seal for the Buhohardivska Palanka, a territorial district within the organization of Nova Sich, which is today in the Mykolaiv Oblast.

== See also ==
- Territorial Defense Forces of the Armed Forces of Ukraine
