= Partyzanske, Bashtanka Raion, Mykolaiv Oblast =

Partyzanske Партизанскье
- Rural settlement
- Location within Mykolaiv Oblast Partyzanske (Ukraine)
- Coordinates: 47°04′12.2″N 32°32′00.5″E
- Sovereign State: Ukraine
- Oblast: Mykolaiv Oblast
- Raion: Bashtanka Raion
- Established: 1937

Area
  - Total: 0.57 km^{2} (0.22 sq mi)
- Elevation: 57 m (187 ft)

Population (2001 census)
  - Total: 1,021
- Time zone: UTC+2 (EET)
  - Summer (DST): UTC+3 (EEST)

Partyzanske (Ukrainian: Партизанське), is a rural settlement located in the Bashtanka Raion of the Mykolaiv Oblast in Ukraine. The governing body is the Partyzanske Village Council. The population is 1,021.

== History ==
On July 17, 2020, the settlement was transferred into the Bashtanka Raion from the Vitovsky Raion.

During the 2022 Russian invasion of Ukraine, the village was occupied and later contested.

== Geography ==
The elevation of the settlement is 57 meters. It has an area of 0.57 square kilometers or ~570 square meters.

The hamlet is located near Snihurvika, Pervomaiske, Novopetrivka and north of Blahodatne.
