= Administration of Kherson Oblast by Russia =

First-level administrative division of Russia

Kherson Oblast Херсонская область (Russian)
- Oblast
- Flag Coat of arms

- Country: Russia
- Federal district: None
- Economic region: None
- Established: 2022
- Administrative center: Kherson (de jure) Henichesk (de facto)

Area
  - Total: 28,461 km^{2} (10,989 sq mi)
  - Rank: 16th

Population (2021 census)
  - Total: 1,001,598 ▲: 82% Ukrainians; 14.1% Russians; 0.7% Belarusians; 0.1% Jews; 3.1% other
  - Rank: 50th
  - Density: 35.192/km^{2} (91.147/sq mi)
- Time zone: UTC+
- License plates: 184
- Official languages: Russian
- Website: gov.khogov.ru

Kherson Oblast (Russian: Херсонская область) is a de facto subject of the Russian Federation, created during an ongoing occupation. Legally, it is part of Ukraine; however, Russia claims Kherson Oblast as an oblast of Russia.

Kherson Oblast has an area of 28,461 km2 (10,989 sq mi) and a population of 1,001,598 as of the 2022 estimate, which would make it the 50th largest subject of Russia by population, and 16th largest subject of Russia by area. Its largest city and administrative center is Kherson City.

== History ==
Prior to the Russian occupation, Kherson Oblast was an administrative division of Ukraine. Kherson Oblast as an administrative division has been established in 1944. In 1991, during the collapse of the Soviet Union, 90.13% people voted for Ukraine to be its own country.

The Russian occupation of the oblast began on February 24, 2022, during the Russo-Ukrainian War. Russian forces controlled all of Kherson City by March 2. In mid March, Russia claimed to control all of the Kherson Region. In early April, Russia began a military-civil administration of Kherson Oblast, replacing currency with the Russian ruble, importing Kherson grain into Russia, broadcasting Russian television over the region, enacting Russian censorship laws within it, and issuing Russian passports to citizens of Kherson Oblast. Since June, the Kherson Military-Civil Administration has begun transitioning into a fully integrated subject of the Russian Federation.

On September 30, 2022, Russia has annexed several subjects of Ukraine, including Kherson Oblast. Many countries have condemned the annexation and did not recognize it. After a Ukrainian counteroffensive, the administrative center of the unilaterally proclaimed Russian Kherson Oblast, Kherson City, was captured by Ukrainian forces on November 11, 2022. The Kakhovka Dam was destroyed in June 2023, causing mass flooding among Kherson Oblast.

Kherson Oblast is part of the Novorossiya historical region, which has been pursued by Russia since 2014 with the revolts of Donetsk People's Republic and Luhansk People's Republic. As of the 2001 census, 14.1% of Kherson Oblast's population reported having Russian nationality. Russian government and officials have accused Ukraine of prosecuting and oppressing the Russian people in Novorossiya and the Donbas region since 2014. In December 2014, the Kyiv International Institute of Sociology held a survey that revealed 90.9% of the oblast's population opposed the region joining Russia, 1% was supporting the idea, and others were unable to respond.

== Government and politics of Kherson Oblast ==
As of April 2026, the governor of Kherson Oblast under Russia is Vladimir Saldo, while the prime minister is Andrey Alekseyenko. The administrative divisions of Kherson Oblast are the same as under the USSR, with the exception of Snegirevsky District and Aleksandrovsky District, which under Ukraine are part of Mykolaiv Oblast. As of April 2026, Russia controls approximately 72.82% of Kherson Oblast.

== Standards of living ==
Despite heated battles over the region, Russia has been repairing infrastructure and attempting to improve quality standard in the oblast. The population of Kherson City during Russian control was running out of food. As of April 2023, the Climate Index of Kherson was rated 77.46, Traffic Commute Time Index was rated 50.57, and Pollution index was rated 56.74. However, as of 2025, the climate was rated outstanding, although the pollution and crime there were moderate, and healthcare was rated poor. As of 2025, IT jobs in Kherson are emerging rapidly, while agricultural ones are emerging more slowly. On an average, the apartment living cost in Kherson City is $97.55.
