= 2022 annexation referendums in Russian-occupied Ukraine =

In late September 2022, in the context of the Russian invasion of Ukraine, Russian-installed officials in Ukraine staged so-called referendums on the annexation of occupied territories of Ukraine by Russia. They were widely described as sham referendums by commentators and denounced by various countries. The validity of the results of the referendums has only been accepted by North Korea.

The votes were conducted in four areas of Ukraine – the Russian-occupied parts of Donetsk and Luhansk oblasts of Ukraine, and the Russian-appointed military administrations of Kherson Oblast and Zaporizhzhia Oblast, captured and occupied in the first week of the 2022 invasion – as well as in Russia. At the time of the referendums, Russia did not fully control any of the four regions, where military hostilities were ongoing. Much of the population had fled since the beginning of the Russian invasion of Ukraine. The referendums were illegal under international law and have been condemned by the United Nations as violations of the United Nations Charter.

On 30 September 2022, Russia's president Vladimir Putin announced the annexation of Donetsk, Kherson, Luhansk and Zaporizhzhia oblasts of Ukraine in an address to both houses of the Russian parliament. The United Nations, Ukraine, and many other countries condemned the annexation.

== Background ==
Russian and pro-Russian separatist control of Ukraine in April 2014

Under the conditions of Russian military occupation and complete dominance of Russian media, the residents of Donetsk and Luhansk oblasts of Ukraine were promised the inclusion of these regions into Russia, as with Crimea. In Russia, a 2015 poll by the Levada Center showed that 19% of polled Russians wanted eastern Ukraine to become part of Russia. In March 2021, 25% of polled Russians supported the annexation of the Donbas separatist republics to Russia.

Vladimir Kypen, the director of the Donetsk Institute for Social Research and Political Analysis, suggested that Russia's refusal to recognise referendums held in Donbas might have been influenced by low support for joining Russia: at the time, 35% of the population of Donbas and "nearby districts" supported joining Russia, while 65% saw themselves as part of Ukraine. However, according to Kypen, general opinion shifted by 2020: in the rebel-held Donbas, 45-50% supported joining Russia, 20-25% wished for return to Ukraine, and 20-30% were ready to accept being a part of either country as long as the war ended.

In the context of the invasion of Ukraine, Russian officials spoke about joining even before the deployment of troops: on 21 February, during a meeting of the Security Council of Russia, Sergey Naryshkin mixed up the topic of conversation and directly supported their entry into the Russian Federation. The reservation gave rise to many rumors about the reality of this plan. Later, the heads of the DPR and the LPR Denis Pushilin and Leonid Pasechnik announced plans to hold referendums, but with the proviso that voting would be held after the end of the war.

On 9 June, on the 350th anniversary of the birth of Peter the Great, Russian president Vladimir Putin described the land that had been conquered by Peter in the Great Northern War against Sweden as land being returned to Russia. He also compared the task facing Russia today to that of Peter's.

Russian control of Ukraine before referendum of September 2022

In the Kherson Oblast, rumours about the creation of the "Kherson People's Republic" or annexation appeared immediately after the occupation in March. Kherson residents responded with rallies under the slogan "Kherson Is Ukraine", which were repressed, with protestors being kidnapped. Local journalist Oleg Baturin, a victim of such a kidnapping, spoke about the use of torture and humiliation against him. The occupying authorities of the Kharkiv Oblast ruled out a formal vote until Russia occupied the entire region. The Russian military-appointed authorities of the Zaporizhzhia Oblast in August signed a decree on preparations for the referendum. However, the decision to hold referendums is not under the jurisdiction of local authorities, but under the administration of the president of Russia.

President of Ukraine Volodymyr Zelenskyy emphasized that holding referendums in the occupied territories would eliminate the possibility for negotiations for Russia. Deputy Prime Minister of Ukraine Iryna Vereshchuk added that the participation of Ukrainian citizens in these elections would be regarded as collaborationism, which is punishable by imprisonment for up to 12 years with confiscation of property.

According to Ukrainian intelligence, before the Ukrainian counteroffensive, Russia planned to hold a referendum in Kharkiv Oblast in November, with a planned 75% vote in favour.

In parallel, on 21 September, Vladimir Putin announced mobilization in Russia, which indicated the desire of the Russian leadership to further escalate the war with Ukraine.

== Organization ==
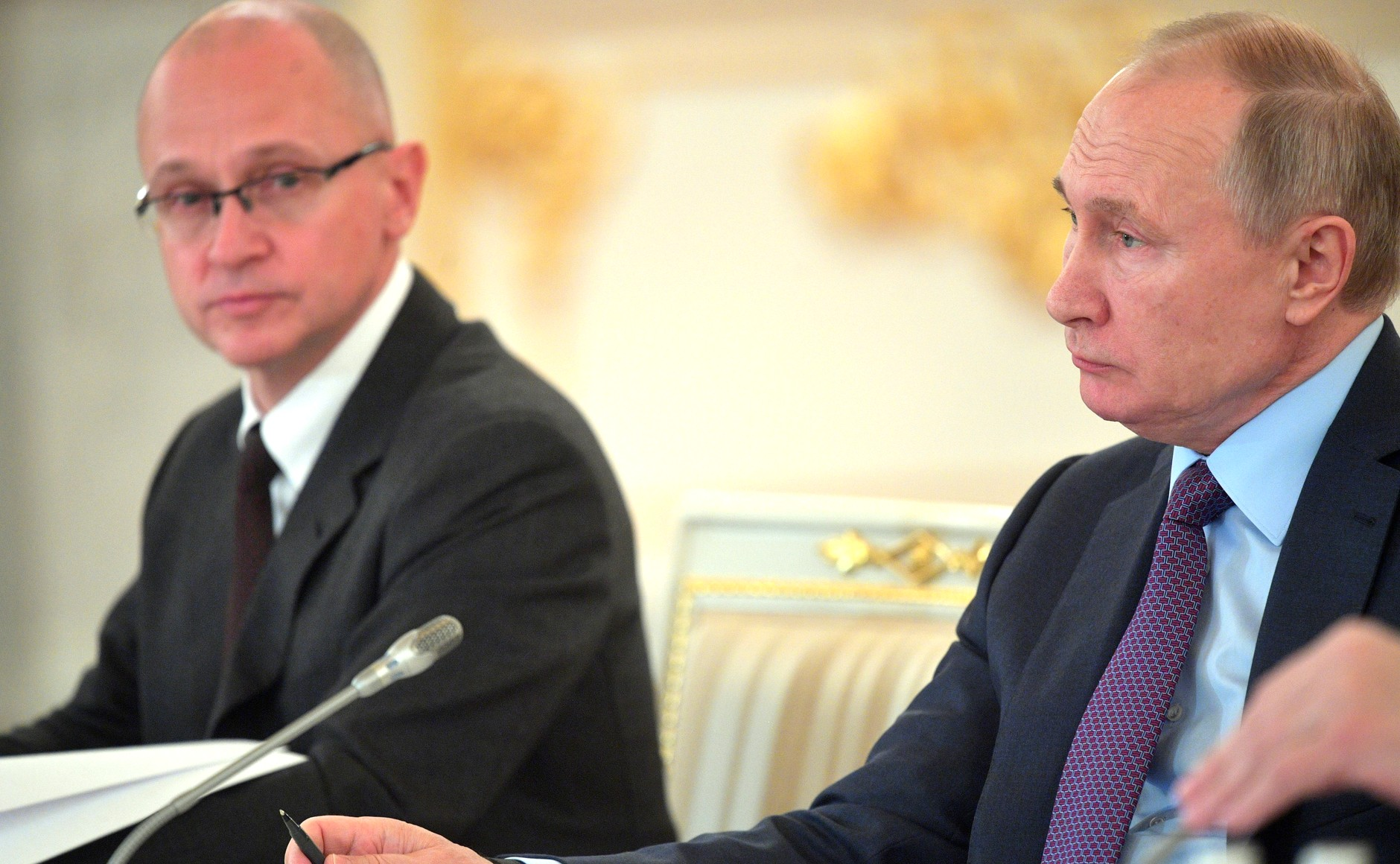
Sergey Kiriyenko (left) became Putin's point man in the Russian-occupied territories of Ukraine.

The preparation of referendums and the formation of a new image of Russia after the annexation of Ukrainian territories were entrusted to the first deputy head of the presidential administration, Sergey Kiriyenko. Under his leadership, an image was formulated for an external audience – Russia as a "continent of freedom" for supporters of right-wing ideologies from all over the world.

As Meduza reported, the organization of the referendums was handled by the Russian State Council's Administration for Ensuring Affairs under the leadership of Alexander Kharichev, a close associate of Kiriyenko. The voting was directly supervised by Kharichev's deputy Boris Rappoport, who is considered a crisis manager and specializes in problematic election campaigns, and since 2014, together with Vladislav Surkov, he has been involved in the affairs of the DPR and the LPR. The chief technologist and coordinator of the referendums was the vice-governor of Sevastopol, Sergei Tolmachev.

Rappoport also selected employees and political technologists with experience in working with the opposition for the role of "political instructors" in the occupation administrations. As Meduza's sources noted, despite salaries of up to 1–2 million rubles a month, few people were ready to go to the occupied territories. and key positions in the governments of the DPR and the LPR were appointed in preparation for the referendums by an official of the Ministry of Industry and Trade, Vitaliy Khotsenko, and a former vice-governor of the Kurgan Oblast, Vladislav Kuznetsov. According to the interlocutor of the publication, the Russian authorities planned to soon remove Denis Pushilin and Leonid Pasechnik and replace them with completely controlled functionaries.

According to Meduza, the Russian authorities planned to hold referendums under the slogan "Together with Russia" (it appeared in the campaign in the Zaporizhzhia Oblast, and a forum of the same name was held in Kherson). The alternative slogan "New Russia", which implied a "new quality" and a stronger Russia, did not please Vladimir Putin and members of the Security Council. The IMA-Consulting group, associated with the first deputy head of the presidential administration, Alexey Gromov, was responsible for the campaign preparations for the referendums.

Russian official Alexander Malkevich of the Civic Chamber of the Russian Federation claimed that over 100 "international observers" from 40 countries were present at the referendums, after Ukrainian intelligence sources had warned that Russian special services had been recruiting foreigners, who would face criminal liability. No observers from international organizations such as the OSCE or Council of Europe were present.

== Donetsk and Luhansk Oblasts ==
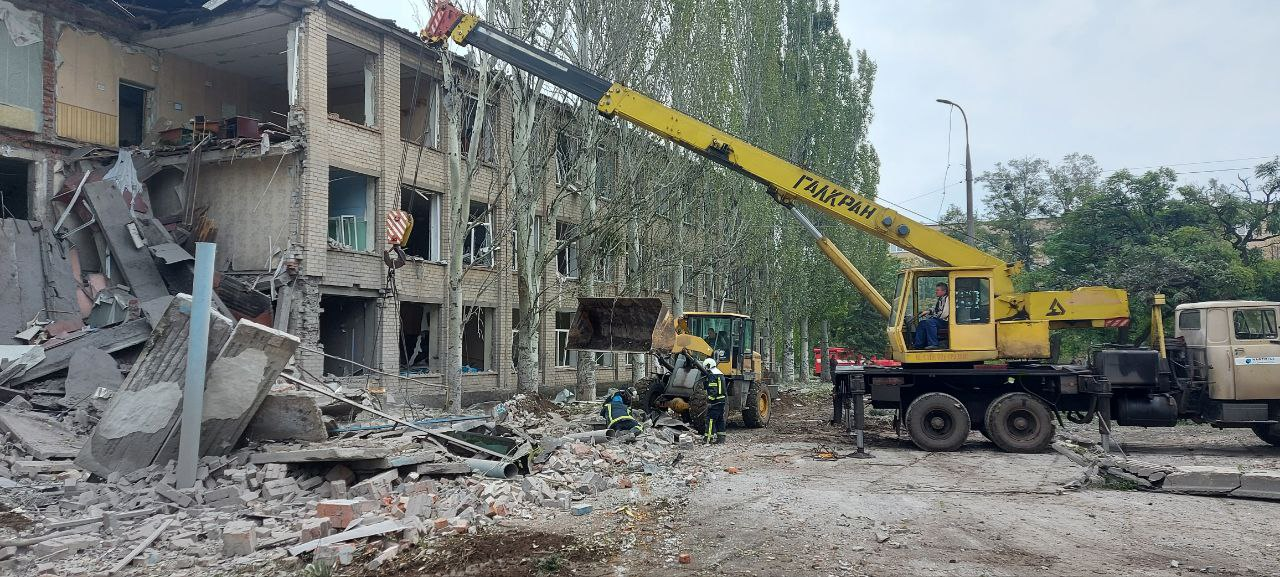
Mykolaivka after shelling on 28 September 2022

The Russian-led militants of the Donetsk People's Republic and the Luhansk People's Republic declared independence from Ukraine in 2014. Pro-Russian separatists held discredited independence referendums in May 2014. After invading Ukraine in February 2022, Russia started preparations to hold referendums in occupied parts of Donetsk and Luhansk.

On 19 September, the public chambers of the Donetsk and Luhansk People's Republics appealed to their heads of state with a request to "immediately" hold a referendum on joining Russia. Soon, the State Duma announced that a referendum on the accession of the LPR to Russia would be held in the autumn "in the near future."

On 20 September, the People's Council of the Luhansk People's Republic scheduled a referendum on the republic's entry into Russia as a federal subject for 23–27 September. Soon after, the People's Council of the Donetsk People's Republic announced that the referendum on the entry of the DPR into the Russian Federation would be held on the same date.

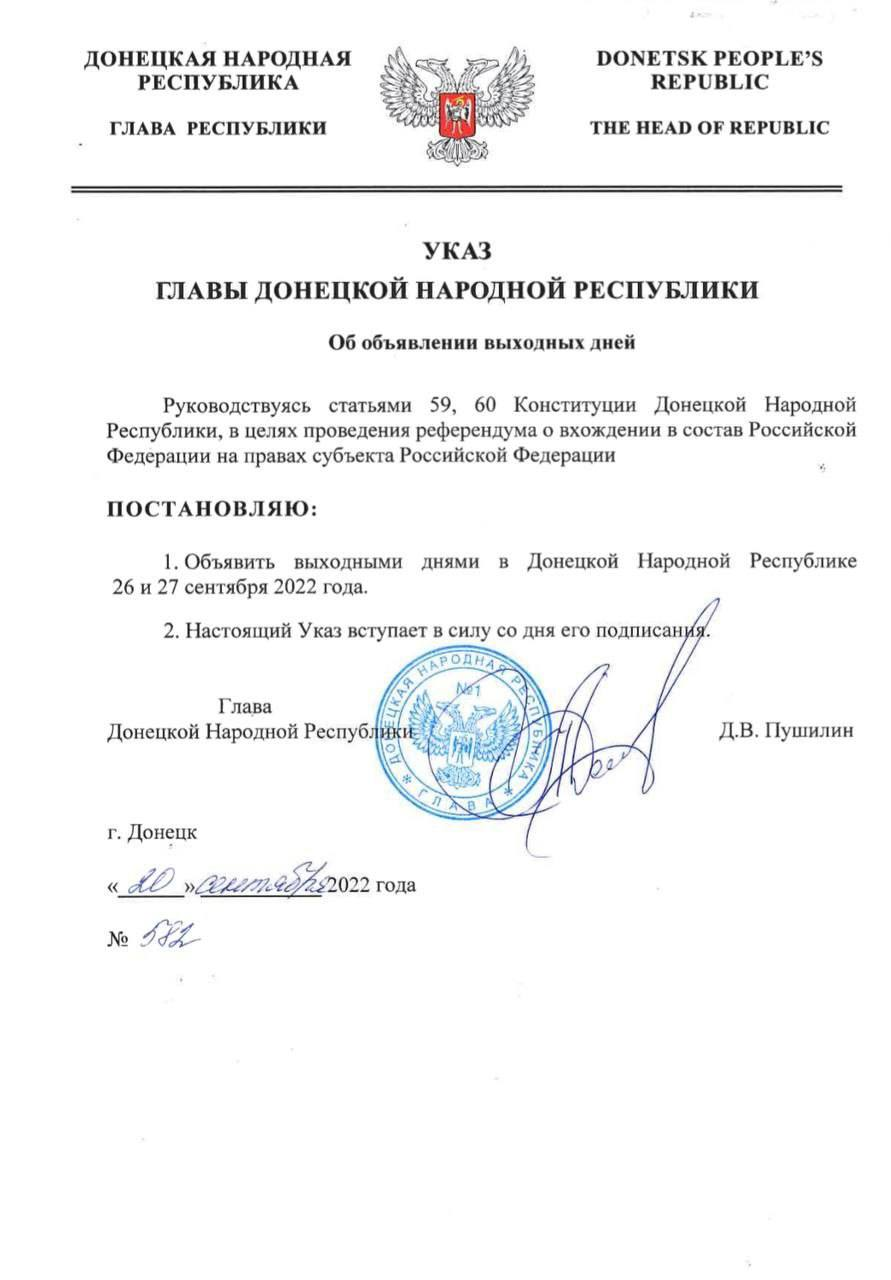
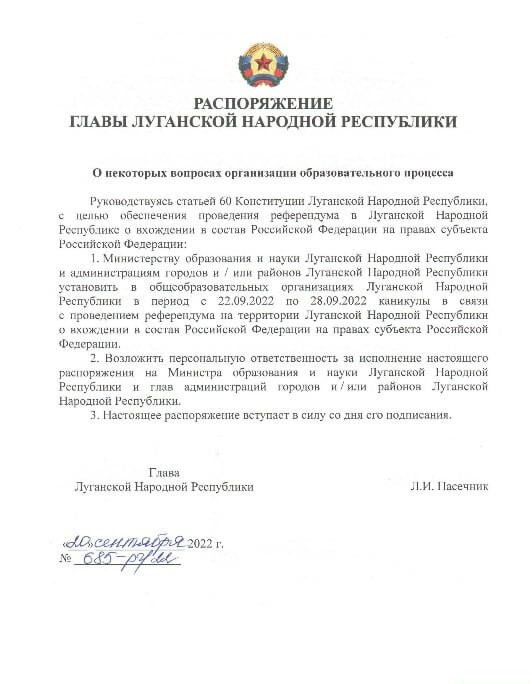
Decrees on the conducting of the referendums in the Donetsk People's Republic (left) and Luhansk People's Republic (right)

=== Questions ===
In the Donetsk People's Republic, the referendum question was phrased as Вы за вхождение Донецкой Народной Республики в состав Российской Федерации на правах субъекта Российской Федерации? ("Do you approve of the Donetsk People's Republic being incorporated into the Russian Federation with subject rights of the Russian Federation?"). The same wording, with only the name of the republic changed, was used on the ballots issued across the Luhansk People's Republic: Вы за вхождение Луганской Народной Республики в состав Российской Федерации на правах субъекта Российской Федерации? ("Do you approve of the Luhansk People's Republic being incorporated into the Russian Federation with subject rights of the Russian Federation?"). Since neither entity recognizes the status of Ukrainian as an administrative language of any kind, the text on the ballots was printed exclusively in Russian.

=== Results ===
According to the results released by the Russian Central Election Commission through its sections in the DPR and the LPR, 99.23% (2,116,800 voters) supported the annexation in Donetsk and 98.42% (1,636,302 voters) in Luhansk. The turnouts were 97.51% (2,131,207 voters) and 94.15% (1,662,607 voters), respectively.

After these figures were released, Leonid Pasechnik, the Head of the Luhansk People's Republic, said that he plans on visiting Moscow to request the admission of Luhansk into the Russian Federation.

== Kherson Oblast ==
The Russian military occupation of parts of Kherson Oblast began on 3 March 2022, when its capital city was captured by the Russian military after the six-day Battle of Kherson.

On 12 March, Ukrainian officials claimed that Russia was planning to stage a referendum in Kherson to establish the Kherson People's Republic, similar to the Donetsk People's Republic and the Luhansk People's Republic. Serhii Khlan, deputy leader of the Kherson Oblast Council, claimed that the Russian military had called all the members of the council and asked them to cooperate. Lyudmyla Denisova, Ombudsman of Ukraine, stated that the referendum would be illegal because "under Ukrainian law any issues over territory can only be resolved by a nationwide referendum". Later that day, the Kherson Oblast Council passed a resolution stating that the proposed referendum would be illegal.

On 11 May 2022, Kirill Stremousov, a deputy head of the Kherson military–civilian administration, announced his readiness to send President Vladimir Putin with a request for Kherson Oblast to join the Russian Federation, noting that there would be no creation of the "Kherson People's Republic" or referendums regarding this matter. Commenting on these statements, Putin's press secretary Dmitry Peskov said that this issue should be decided by the inhabitants of the region and that "these fateful decisions must have an absolutely clear legal background, legal justification, be absolutely legitimate, as was the case with Crimea".

In June 2022, Stremousov, in a video message on the Telegram channel, said that the Kherson region began to prepare for a referendum on joining Russia. The referendum was going to be prepared by the pro-Putin United Russia party, but members fled the region towards the end of July after Ukrainian forces shelled the Antonivka Road Bridge. Authorities in the occupied Zaporizhzhia Oblast region have not ruled out the possibility of a joint referendum.

On 5 September, Stremousov announced that the referendum in Kherson Oblast had been postponed due to "security reasons."

On 7 September, Andrey Turchak, secretary-general of the United Russia party, stated that it "would be right and symbolic" to hold the referendums in Russian-occupied Ukraine on 4 November, Russia's Unity Day; Stremousov stated that preparations would be made for this date, "even if we are ready for this referendum to take place right now".

On 20 September, Head of the Kherson Oblast Military–Civilian Administration Volodymyr Saldo announced that the referendum on the entry of the Kherson Oblast into Russia would be held from 23 to 27 September.

=== Question ===
The text printed on the ballots is bilingual, with Ukrainian alongside Russian:

Do you approve of having Kherson Oblast exit Ukraine, reforming Kherson Oblast into a self-governing state as well as incorporating it into the Russian Federation with subject rights of the Russian Federation?

=== Result ===
According to the figures released by the Kherson regional section of the Russian Central Election Commission, 87.05% (497,051) supported the annexation to the Russian Federation, with 12.05% (68,832) against and 0.9% of ballots invalid, on a turnout of 76.86%. TASS reported that 571,001 voters took part.

== Zaporizhzhia Oblast ==
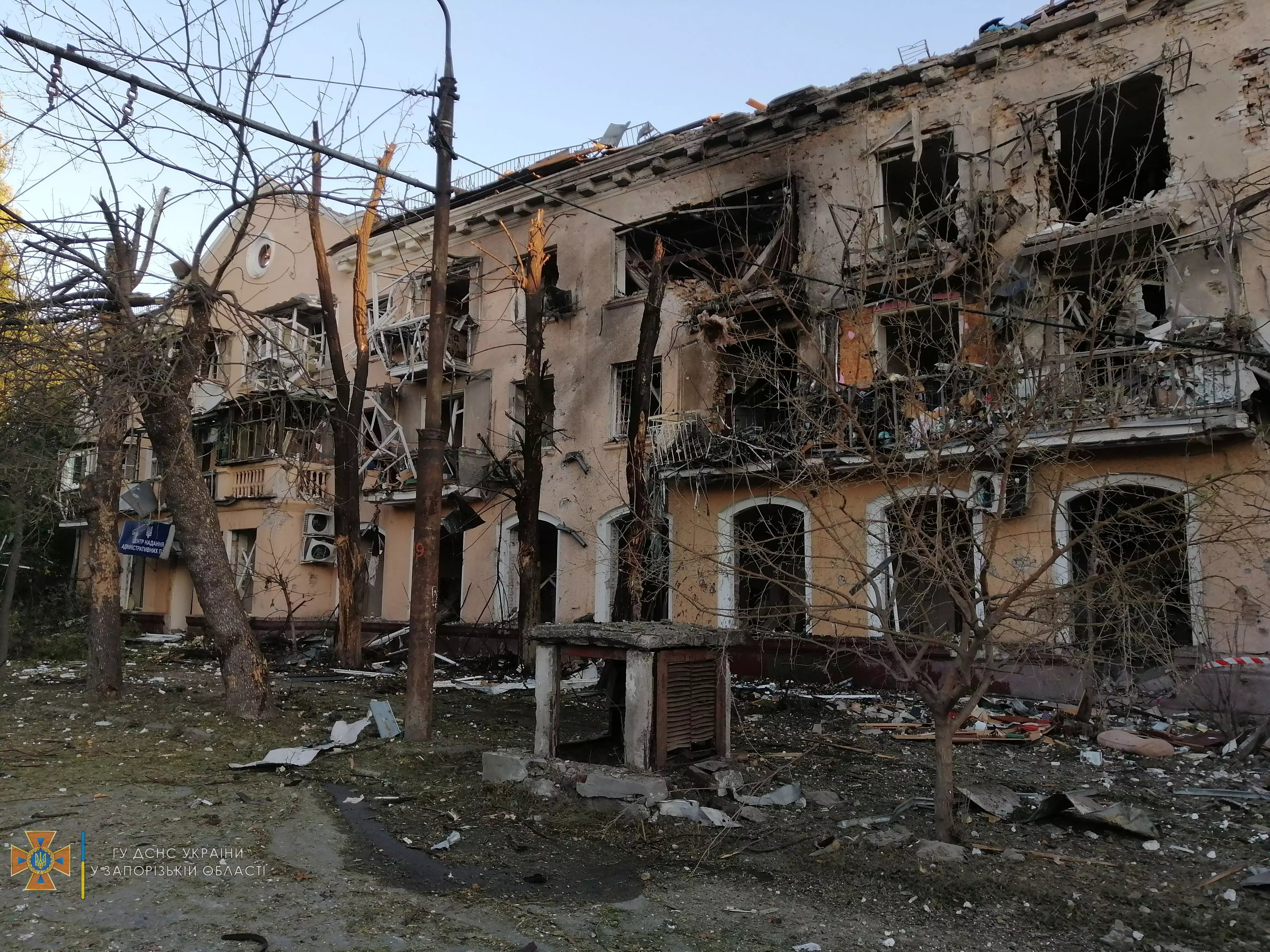
The city of Zaporizhzhia after shelling on 24 September 2022

The Russian military occupation of parts of Zaporizhzhia Oblast began on 27 February 2022, when the port city of Berdiansk was captured by the Russian military after a three-day battle.

In July 2022, Yevhen Balytskyi, the Russian-installed Mayor of Melitopol and the head of the Zaporizhzhia Oblast Military–Civilian Administration, signed an order for the Central Election Commission of Zaporizhzhia to begin investigating the possibility of a referendum for the region to join the Russian Federation. The date of the referendum on the entry of the Zaporizhzhia region into Russia will be determined "as soon as its security and freedom of expression are guaranteed," Vladimir Rogov, a member of the Russian-installed main council of the regional administration, told the media.

On 11 August 2022, authorities in the occupied region expressed their desire to hold the referendum on 11 September 2022. On 26 August 2022, the Electoral Commission for the preparation of a referendum in the Zaporizhzhia Oblast began work.

On 22 September, Balytskyi announced that the referendum on the entry of the Zaporizhzhia Oblast into Russia will be held from 23 to 27 September. This would include all of Zaporizhzhia, including territories not controlled by the Russian military administration. Vladimir Rogov, a collaborator with the Russian administration, demanded Ukrainian troops leave the region "immediately," and that after the referendum "they will be considered occupiers." At the time of the referendum Russia controlled 73% of the region's territory but not its capital, the town of Zaporizhzhia.

On the first day of the "referendum", Vladimir Rogov, a member of the Main Council of MCA, said that the Russian-controlled part of the Zaporizhzhia Oblast will be de jure independent for "some time" following the referendum.

=== Question ===
The text printed on the ballots is bilingual, with Ukrainian alongside Russian:

Do you approve of having Zaporizhzhia Oblast exit Ukraine, reforming Zaporizhzhia Oblast into a self-governing state as well as incorporating it into the Russian Federation with subject rights of the Russian Federation?

=== Result ===
On 27 September, Russian officials of the Central Election Commission in Zaporizhzhia claimed that the referendum passed, with 93.11% (of 541,093 voters) favoured joining the Russian Federation. The declared turnout was 85.4%. According to the data provided by the commission, the support for the annexation was 90.01% in the Melitopol Raion, while in its administrative center, Melitopol, it was 96.78%.

== Other planned locations ==
=== Mykolaiv Oblast ===
On 8 August 2022, Ekaterina Gubareva, deputy head of the Kherson Civilian-Military Administration announced the annexation of occupied territories of Mykolaiv Oblast. She also claimed that in some occupied towns, Russian mobile communications have begun to work. According to her, such a decision was made in order to provide the population with social payments in the "liberated" territories, as well as to establish mobile communications and television broadcasting.

On 13 August 2022, the head of the military-civilian administration of the Mykolaiv Oblast, Yuriy Barbashov claimed that a referendum would take place in Snihurivka to join Russia. The referendum would be aligned with the one in Kherson Oblast. Moreover, Ekaterina Gubareva, deputy head of the military-civilian administration of Kherson, claimed that occupied parts of Mykolaiv Oblast would be annexed into Kherson Oblast. It was said that the referendum would take place in September.

Snihurivka people protested against the sham referendum.

=== Kharkiv Oblast ===
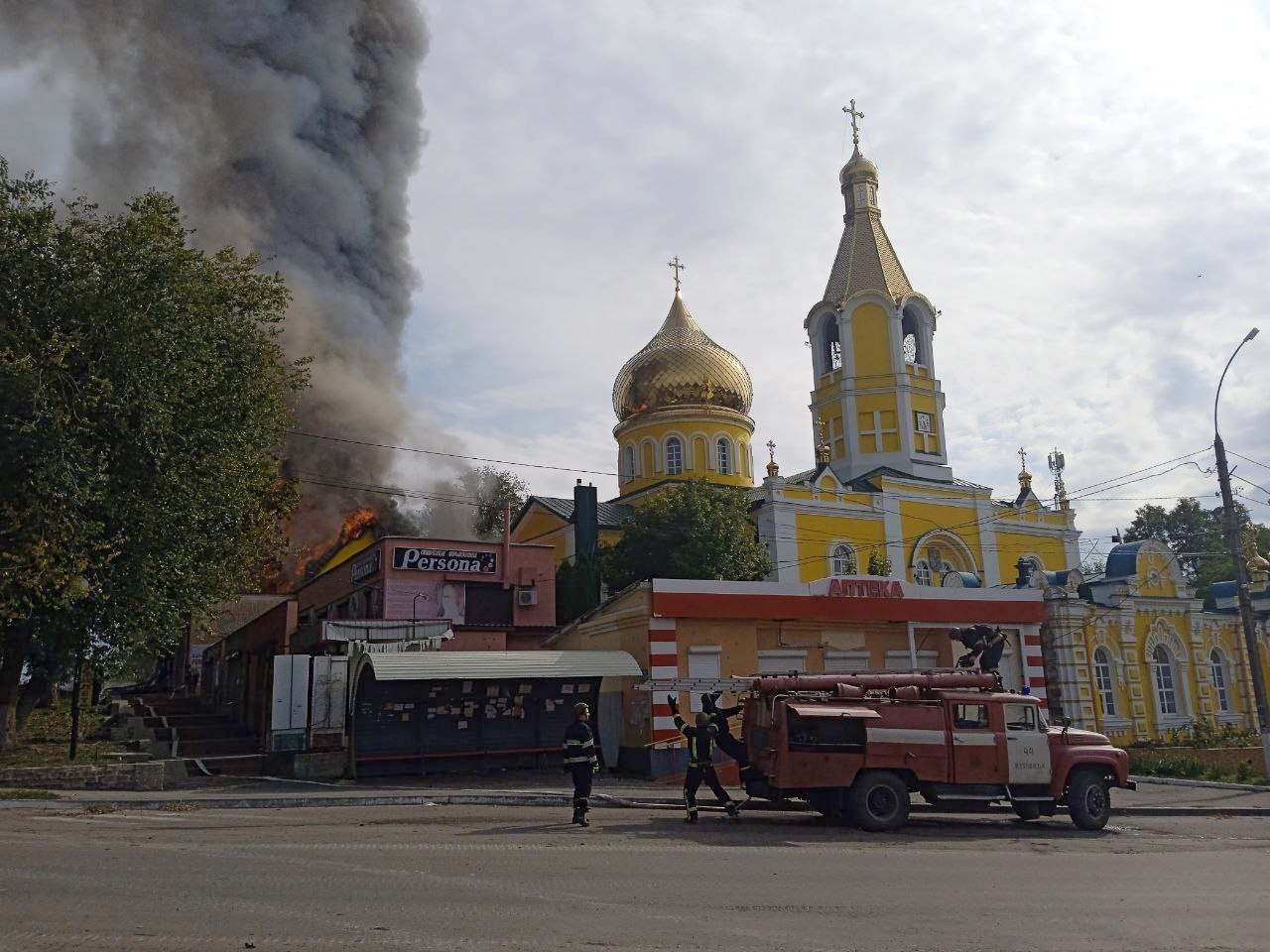
A fire in Saint Nicholas church in Kupiansk after shelling on 26 September 2022

On 8 July 2022, Vitaly Ganchev, the Russian-appointed head of the military-civilian administration of Kharkiv Oblast, said that Kharkiv is an 'inalienable' part of Russian territory and intends for Kharkiv to be annexed by the Russian Federation. But on 11 August, Ganchev told the Russia-24 TV channel that the authorities of the areas of Kharkiv Oblast controlled by Russian troops are not yet ready to discuss a referendum on joining Russia, because "only 20 percent and no more" of the region is under Russian control. Residents lacking food were denied aid unless they submitted information for the voting register. The Security Service of Ukraine (SBU) assessed that a similar referendum would have occurred in Kharkiv Oblast if not for the Ukrainian counteroffensive in September that forced Russia to retreat from most of the territory it occupied.

== Opinion polls ==
There are no public independent statistics on attitudes towards referendums in the occupied territories. A survey taken before the Russian invasion of Ukraine by the Kyiv International Institute of Sociology (KIIS) suggested that support for joining the Russian Federation ranges from 1% in Kherson Oblast to 13.2% in Luhansk Oblast. According to closed polls commissioned by the Russian authorities in July 2022, about 30% of those surveyed supported joining Russia, about 30% supported staying in Ukraine, and the rest declined to answer.

In the poll conducted by the Kyiv International Institute of Sociology between 13 and 18 May 2022, 77% of Ukrainians living in Russian-occupied territory said they did not support any territorial concessions to Russia, even if it would prolong the war. A KIIS poll conducted in September 2022 found that 87% of Ukrainians opposed any territorial concessions to Russia, up from 82% in May 2022. Only 24% of ethnic Russians in Ukraine supported territorial concessions to Russia.

Many Ukrainians have fled Russian-occupied territories to avoid referendums and living in territory annexed by Russia. According to Ukrainian journalist Serhiy Harmash, "In Kherson and the region of Zaporizhzhia, many hate Russia — but in Donetsk and Luhansk, people have had their heads filled with propaganda for the past eight years."

== Opinions on the goals of holding referendums ==
Military analysts link the decision to hold referendums with the weakness of the Russian Federation on the battlefield. Their announcement followed the rapid advance of the Ukrainian army in the weeks prior, defeating Russian troops in the Kharkiv direction and on the offensive in the east and south. Analysts estimate Russia has lost tens of thousands of troops, has announced a mobilisation to recruit new soldiers, and is facing mounting backlash over its long-term invasion and the general mobilisation order. Sources such as The Guardian have called the referendums pre-determined and assumed that Russia will dictate that the results will favour annexation.

== Conduct ==
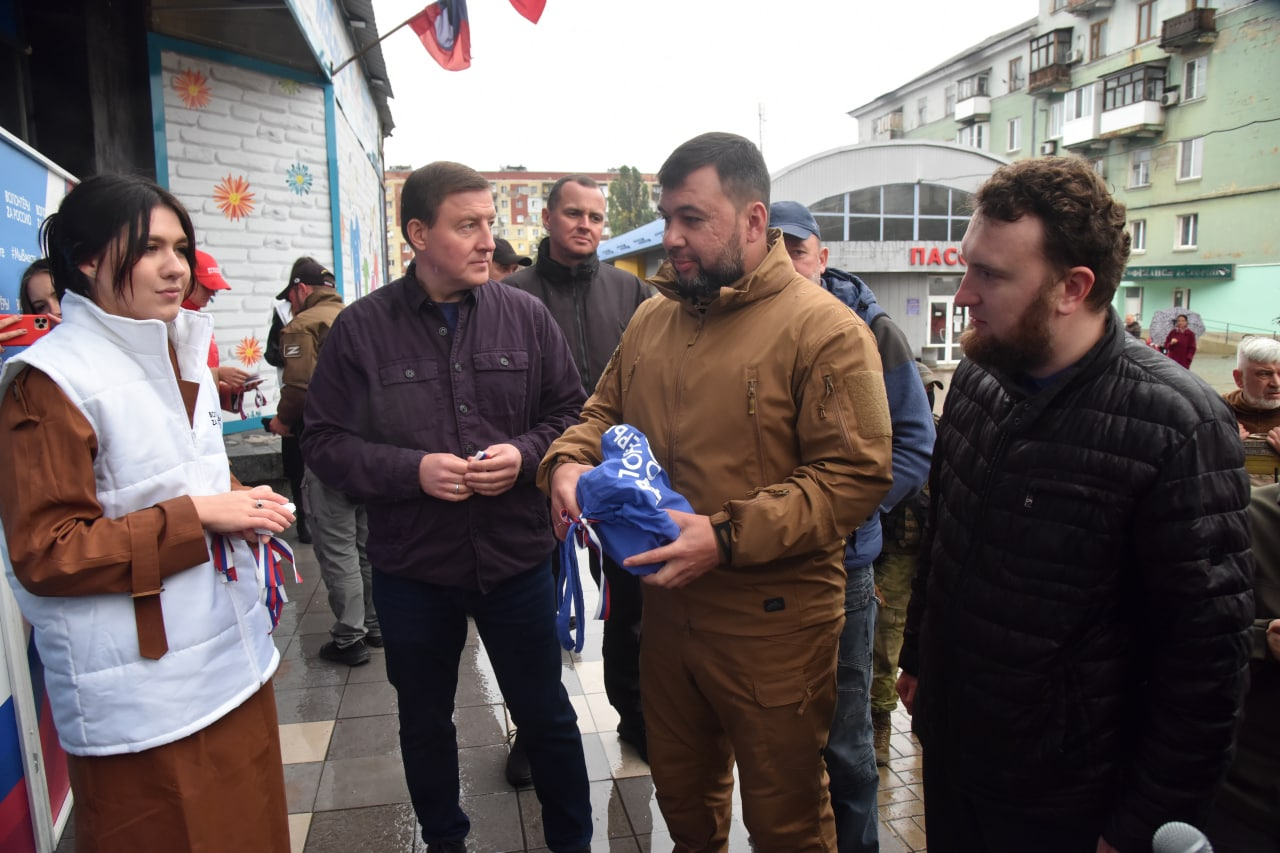
On the first day of the referendum, 23 September. DPR leader Denis Pushilin and Russian politician Andrey Turchak of Putin's United Russia party

During the first four days, only specific people were able to vote, and it was possible to vote in adjoining territories. On the last day, 27 September, polling stations would open for residents. The occupation authorities explained this decision by concern for the safety of residents, many of whom had to vote in front-line settlements.

Voters were coerced into voting with armed soldiers going door to door to collect votes. Ballots were filled out by the soldiers rather than the voters themselves (voters were required to give their votes verbally to a soldier, who wrote on a sheet of paper). Individuals were not allowed to vote, as there was only one vote allowed per household. Voters did not need any form of identification in order to cast a vote. The events ended on 27 September, although, according to the UK ambassador to Ukraine, the final results had likely already been decided beforehand. According to a contributor at the Washington Law Review, Russia will try to use the illegal referendums to give official justification for the annexation of additional Ukrainian territory and for possible negotiations with Ukraine about its NATO status, which is currently unclear due to conflicting statements in past Ukrainian law.

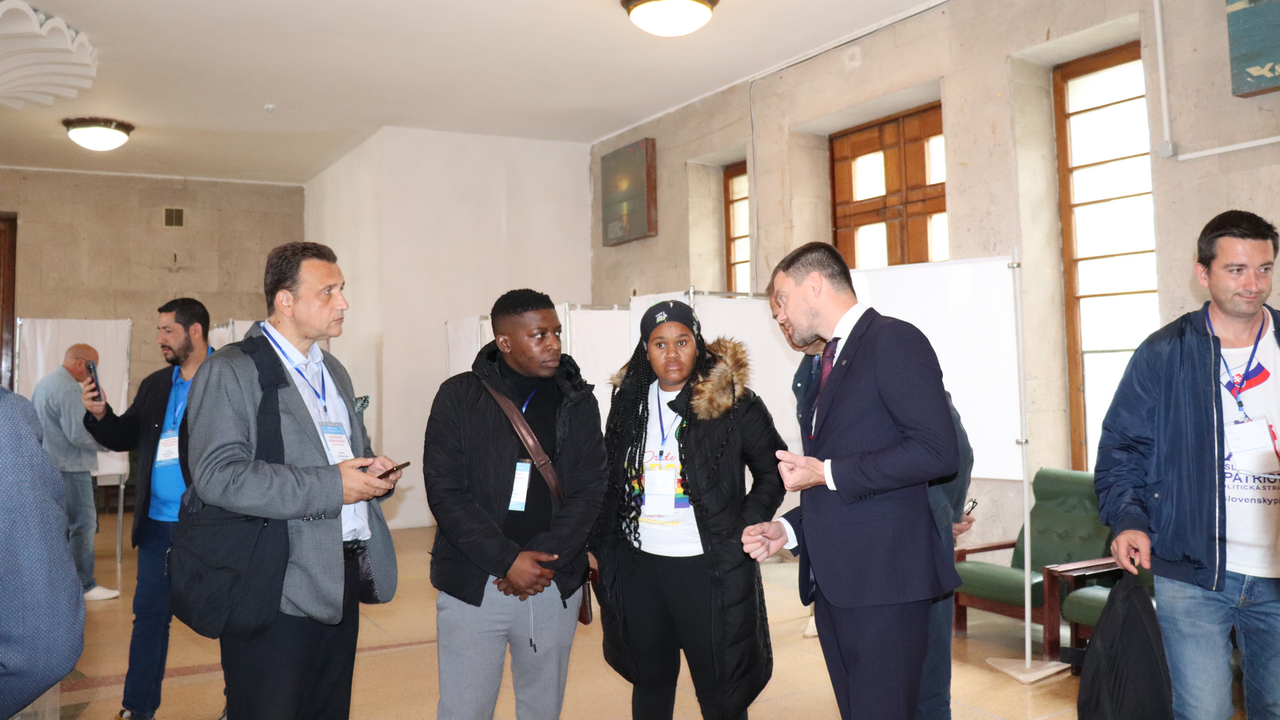
The "observers" to Russia's sham referendums. Ukraine denounced eight countries for sending observers to the ballots.

=== First day ===
The election commissions began work at 8:00 a.m. Moscow time on 23 September. Polling stations for "voting" opened in Russia at the same time.

On the first day of "voting", rallies were held in Russian cities "in support of referendums on joining Russia" in the occupied Ukrainian regions. In a number of cases, students were offered money and additional points for participating in the rally.

=== Second day ===
Anonymous local residents of the cities complained that along with the "election commissions" walking around the apartments, there were military men with automatic rifles, and that "there is no secret ballot." Head of the Luhansk Regional Military–Civil Administration Serhii Haidai said that "commissioners" threatened to break down doors, collected names of those who voted "no", and used the opportunity to identify men eligible for conscription. Residents of Berdiansk told reporters that there were many tents with Russian propaganda in the centre of the city, and there were also volunteers with ballot boxes.

=== Third day ===
According to data published by the organizers, on the third day of the referendum, the turnout exceeded 50% in the DPR, LPR and Zaporizhzhia Oblast, according to Russian media – which makes the referendums "valid".

=== Fourth day ===
According to the organizers and Russian media, the referendum was recognized as "valid" in the Kherson Oblast: according to their data, more than 50% of voters were able to vote there.

=== Fifth day ===
Unlike previous days, on the fifth day of polling, the referendum was held at polling stations.

== Reactions ==
On 12 October 2022, the UN General Assembly adopted Resolution ES 11/4 declaring that the staged referendums and attempted annexation are invalid and illegal under international law. In favour: 143 Against: 5 Abstained: 35 Absent: 10 Non-member

=== Ukraine ===
The government considers the referendum illegitimate, and has accused Russia of coercing residents to vote, as well as busing in sympathetic voters from Crimea.

=== Russia ===
Federal subjects of Russia after 2022. Crimea, Donbas, Kherson, and Zaporizhzhia, internationally recognized as parts of Ukraine, shown with diagonal stripes.

Former Russian president and Deputy Chairman of the Russian Security Council, Dmitry Medvedev posted on Telegram that "The referendums are over, the results are clear. Welcome home, to Russia!".

A number of Russian experts, including Mikhail Minakov and Oleg Ignatov, pointed out that the referendums were illegal even per Russian law and the fact that they were conducted without any form of control over significant parts of the territories was described as a unique precedent that undermined even slightest illusions of their legality.

In March 2024, Vladimir Putin praised the "return" of the annexed territories to Russia, saying, "As for Novorossiya, as for the Donbas, the people living there ... declared their desire to return to their native family. Their way back to their homeland turned out to be harder, more tragic, but nevertheless, we did it."

=== International organisations ===
- United Nations: UN Secretary-General António Guterres called the referendums a "violation of the UN Charter and international law". Some days later he said, "The Charter is clear. Any annexation of a State's territory by another State resulting from the threat or use of force is a violation of the Principles of the UN Charter and international law. ... [T]he so-called 'referenda'" cannot be called a genuine expression of the popular will.
- The Organization for Security and Co-operation in Europe (OSCE): Heads of OSCE condemned the plans to hold referendums on Ukraine's occupied territories, calling it illegal under both international and Ukrainian law.
- NATO: Secretary General of NATO Jens Stoltenberg wrote on Twitter that "Sham referendums have no legitimacy and do not change the nature of Russia's war of aggression against Ukraine. This is a further escalation in Putin's war".
- EU: High Representative of the Union for Foreign Affairs and Security Policy Josep Borrell stated that "The European Union strongly condemns these planned illegal 'referenda' which go against the legal and democratically elected Ukrainian authorities".

=== Countries ===
- Australia: Minister for Foreign Affairs Penny Wong stated "The areas of Ukraine currently occupied by Russian forces are the sovereign territory of Ukraine. No sham referendum will change this."
- Austria: Austrian Foreign Ministry stated "the sham referenda lack any legitimacy under international law and will not be recognized".
- Brazil: Permanent representative to the United Nations, Ronaldo Costa Filho, stated that "it is unreasonable to assume that populations in areas in conflict can freely express their will."
- Bulgaria: Ministry of Foreign Affairs stated that Moscow's nuclear rhetoric and so-called referenda "amplify the necessity of consistent support" for Ukraine's sovereignty, independence and territorial integrity.
- Canada: Prime Minister Justin Trudeau said on Twitter that Canada and the G7 "will never recognize the outcome".
- China: State Councilor and Foreign Minister Wang Yi said that sovereignty and territorial integrity of all countries must be respected.
- Czech Republic:
  - President Miloš Zeman signed a joint statement that rejects Russian attempts to illegally annex Ukrainian territories.
  - Prime Minister Petr Fiala wrote on Twitter that "the Czech Republic does not recognise the referendums on the annexation of four Ukrainian regions to Russia" and that "Russia's annexation of these territories is unacceptable and illegitimate and the Czech Republic continues to regard these territories as Ukrainian."
- Denmark: Prime Minister Mette Frederiksen condemned the referendums and called them "illegally orchestrated by Russia on Ukrainian soil" and added "they have nothing to do with the will of the people".
- Estonia: Prime Minister Kaja Kallas tweeted "We will never recognize this" and "Ukraine has every right to take back its territory." President Alar Karis signed a joint statement that rejects Russian attempts to illegally annex Ukrainian territories.
- Finland: President Sauli Niinistö and Prime Minister Sanna Marin condemned Russia's sham referendums and stated that Finland will not recognise any attempt to annex parts of Ukraine.
- France: President Emmanuel Macron called the referendums a "farce" and stated that France would not recognise the results.
- Georgia: The Ministry of Foreign Affairs condemned the referendums, reaffirming support for Ukraine's sovereignty and territorial integrity.
- Germany: Chancellor Olaf Scholz strongly criticised the idea of Russia holding referendums in parts of Ukraine. He said it is "quite clear these sham referendums cannot be accepted", citing their illegitimacy according to "international law and by the understandings that the world community has found".
- Ghana: Ambassador and Permanent Representative to the United Nations in New York Harold Adlai Agyeman stated that the international community "cannot continue to live in parallel universes" and urged Russia to respect the sovereignty of Ukraine.
- Hungary: Minister of the Prime Minister's Office Gergely Gulyás announced that Hungary does not recognize the annexation of Ukrainian territory by Russia.
- India: The Spokesperson of the Ministry of External Affairs Arindam Bagchi expressed support for "sovereignty and territorial integrity" of Ukraine.
- Indonesia: President Joko Widodo remarked that the referendum further complicates peace negotiations to resolve the conflict.
- Iran: Spokesperson of the Iranian Ministry of Foreign Affairs Nasser Kanaani emphasized the necessity of observing territorial integrity under international law.
- (Republic of Ireland) Ireland: Irish Foreign Minister Simon Coveney stated that Ireland rejects the "sham referendums" and that "Ireland will never recognise Russian claims to illegally-annexed parts of Ukraine, and will remain steadfast in its support for the people of Ukraine."
- Israel: The Israeli Foreign Ministry announced that Israel will not recognize the results of the referendum held in four occupied districts in eastern Ukraine. In a published message it is written that "Israel recognizes the sovereignty and territorial integrity of Ukraine, and will not recognize the results of the referendums in the eastern regions of Ukraine".
- Japan: In a phone call with President Zelenskyy, Japanese Prime Minister Fumio Kishida strongly condemned Russia's annexation of Ukrainian territory, saying that "the process Russia called a referendum and its annexation of parts of Ukraine should never be accepted."
- Kazakhstan: Ministry of Foreign Affairs of Kazakhstan spokesperson Aibek Smadiarov stated that Kazakhstan will not recognise the referendums. He also added that "Kazakhstan proceeds from the principles of territorial integrity of states, their sovereign equivalence and peaceful coexistence".
- Latvia: President Egils Levits signed a joint statement that rejects Russian attempts to illegally annex Ukrainian territories.
- Lithuania: President Gitanas Nausėda signed a joint statement that rejects Russian attempts to illegally annex Ukrainian territories. Minister of National Defence and historian Arvydas Anušauskas compared the annexation referendums to the rigged 1940 parliamentary elections in Lithuania, Latvia and Estonia that led to the annexation of Soviet-occupied Baltic states in 1940.
- Mexico: Permanent Representative to the UN Juan Ramón de la Fuente, stated that any attempt to change borders of Ukraine by using threats and other means violates international law.
- Moldova: President Maia Sandu stated that "the Republic of Moldova respects the territorial integrity and sovereignty of Ukraine and considers "false" the so-called referendums held by the Russian Federation in several Ukrainian regions", adding that Moldova "does not recognize any actions taken after the fake referendums" and that the 2022 invasion had "dramatically affected" Moldova–Russia relations.
- Montenegro: President Milo Đukanović signed a joint statement that rejects Russian attempts to illegally annex Ukrainian territories.
- Netherlands: Prime Minister Mark Rutte, said "Let it be clear that this annexation, like that of Crimea, will never be accepted by The Netherlands. The world will not accept that Putin changes borders with the stroke of a pen."
- New Zealand: Foreign Minister Nanaia Mahuta said "Aotearoa New Zealand does not recognise the results of the sham referenda in Russia-occupied regions of Ukraine"
- North Korea: Director general of the Department of International Organizations of the Foreign Ministry Jo Chol Su stated that "We respect the will of the residents who aspired toward the integration into Russia and support the Russian government's stand of making the above-said regions components of Russia."
- North Macedonia: President Stevo Pendarovski signed a joint statement that rejects Russian attempts to illegally annex Ukrainian territories.
- Poland: President Andrzej Duda stated that the referendums are worth nothing and Poland will not recognise the results, and signed a joint statement that rejects Russian attempts to illegally annex Ukrainian territories
- Romania: Foreign Minister of Romania Bogdan Aurescu called the referendums "completely unacceptable" and reiterated Romania's support for the "independence, sovereignty & territorial integrity of Ukraine, within its internationally recognised borders". President Klaus Iohannis signed a joint statement that rejects Russian attempts to illegally annex Ukrainian territories.
- Serbia: Minister of Foreign Affairs of Serbia Nikola Selaković said that the country will not recognise the results of the referendums.
- Singapore: Singapore's Ministry of Foreign Affairs stated that "The decision by the Russian Federation to formally annex the occupied Ukrainian regions of Donetsk, Luhansk, Zaporizhzhia and Kherson violates international law and the UN Charter, and that the sovereignty, political independence and territorial integrity of all countries must be respected."
- Slovakia: President Zuzana Čaputová, Speaker of the National Council Boris Kollár and Prime Minister Eduard Heger strongly condemned the "pseudo-referendums" in a joint statement, emphasizing that the Slovak Republic recognizes Ukraine as an independent and sovereign state whose territorial integrity within internationally recognised borders must not be questioned. She also signed a joint statement that rejects Russian attempts to illegally annex Ukrainian territories.
- Spain: The Ministry of Foreign Affairs condemned the "illegal voting shams organised in Ukraine", stressing the government's "firm support of Ukraine's sovereignty and territorial integrity within its internationally recognised borders".
- Sweden: The Swedish prime minister Magdalena Andersson stated in a press conference that the referendums in Russian-occupied Ukraine is "nothing but a farce".
- Switzerland: The Federal Council stated that Russia, as the occupying power, is obliged under international law to comply with international humanitarian law, human rights and the existing Ukrainian legal system and that the occupying power does not gain sovereignty over the area. Switzerland will not recognize the result of the so-called referendum. The Federal Department of Foreign Affairs has summoned the Russian ambassador to convey Switzerland's position.
- Taiwan: The Ministry of Foreign Affairs of the Republic of China condemned the annexation and reaffirms that it stands with like-minded countries in neither recognizing the outcomes of the sham referendums held by Russia nor accepting the actions taken by Russia to illegally annex Ukrainian territory.
- Turkey: President Recep Tayyip Erdoğan has maintained a constructive relationship with both NATO and Russia, but decried the attempt with a public statement reading in part, "Such illegitimate faits accomplis will not be recognised by the international community. On the contrary, they will complicate efforts to revitalise the diplomatic process and deepen instability".
- United Arab Emirates: Deputy Permanent Representative to the UN Mohamed Abushahab stated that referendums in Russian-occupied Ukraine will complicate Russia–Ukraine peace negotiations.
- United Kingdom: Foreign Secretary James Cleverly said the UK had evidence that Russian officials had already set targets for "invented voter turnouts and approval rates for these sham referenda".
- United States: President Joe Biden, speaking at the UN General Assembly, denounced the "sham referenda" and stated that the United States will not recognize the results.

=== Human rights organizations ===
- Amnesty International described the referendums as "a ruse for Russia to illegally annex occupied Ukrainian territory" and a "profound disregard for international law and the rights of people in the territories under its occupation".
- Human Rights Watch stated that the referendums "hold no legal value and don't provide a basis for annexation or transfer of sovereignty."

=== Other ===
As a result of the sham referendums and of the subsequent annexation, an Internet meme portraying a satirical annexation of Kaliningrad Oblast by the Czech Republic as the "Královec Region" (Czech: Královecký kraj) emerged.

== Possible consequences ==
The referendums resulted in the de-jure annexation of Donetsk, Luhansk, Kherson, and Zaporizhzhia Oblasts of Ukraine by Russia.

On 22 September, Deputy Chairman of the Russian Security Council Dmitry Medvedev said that any weapons in Moscow's arsenal, including strategic nuclear weapons, could be used to protect territories annexed to Russia from Ukraine. He also said that referendums organized by Russia-installed and separatist authorities would take place in large swathes of Russian-occupied Ukrainian territory and that there was "no turning back". Medvedev said that Donbas republics and other territories "will be accepted into Russia" and mobilisation will also be used to protect the annexed territories. Russian senator Konstantin Kosachev warned that after the referendums, "protecting people in this region will not be our right, but our duty. An attack on people and territories will be an attack on Russia. With all the consequences." Russian Foreign Minister Sergey Lavrov did not rule out the use of nuclear weapons to defend annexed Ukrainian territories.

Ivan Fedorov, the exiled mayor of occupied Melitopol, stated that the main reason for the pseudo-referendum in the Zaporizhzhia Oblast is to conscript local men into military service for Russia, just as was the case in the "people's republics" of the Donbas region during the mobilization in Donetsk and Luhansk People's Republics on 19 February 2022.

Some estimates suggest that reconstruction of the war-torn annexed territories would cost Russia between $100 and $200 billion. The reconstruction of Mariupol alone will likely cost more than $14 billion.

== Aftermath ==
Presidential decrees No. 685 (left) and No. 686 (right), recognizing the independence of Zaporizhzhia and Kherson oblasts.

On 29 September, the Kremlin announced that Putin would sign treaties on the following day to formally annex territory from Ukraine. According to The Guardian, the territories were not named, but Kremlin reporters indicated that four treaties would be signed, which corresponds to the four regions Russia in which the referendums were organized. Putin's press secretary Dmitry Peskov said that agreements "on the accession of new territories into the Russian Federation" will be signed "with all four territories that held referendums and made corresponding requests to the Russian side," and that Putin would "deliver a major speech on the subject."

On the same day, Putin recognized the Kherson and Zaporizhzhia regions as independent countries, hours before signing a decree on the annexation of all four regions.

== See also ==
- Electoral fraud
- Annexation
- Collaboration with Russia during the Russian invasion of Ukraine

=== Likewise referendums ===
- 1938 Austrian Anschluss referendum
- 1946 Polish people's referendum
- 2014 Crimean status referendum
- 2014 Donbas status referendums

=== Irredentism ===
- Russian irredentism
- Novorossiya (confederation)
- Proposed Russian annexation of South Ossetia
- Proposed Russian annexation of Transnistria

=== Geopolitical aspects ===
- List of military occupations
- List of national border changes (1914–present)
- Russian-occupied territories
- Territorial evolution of Russia
- Timeline of geopolitical changes (2000–present)
