= Khlan =

Khlan (Ukrainian: Хлань), also spelled Chlan or Hlan, is a surname. Notable people with the surname include:

- Maksym Khlan (born 2003), Ukrainian footballer
- Serhii Khlan (born 1972), Ukrainian politician
