= Komisarivka =

Komisarivka (Ukrainian: Комісарівка) may refer to the following places in Ukraine:

- Komisarivka, Dnipropetrovsk Oblast
- Komisarivka, Alchevsk Raion, Luhansk Oblast
- Komisarivka, Krasnodon Raion, Luhansk Oblast
- Komisarivka, Mykolaiv Oblast
