= Komsomolske =

Komsomolske is the name of several localities in Ukraine:

- Komsomolske, Crimea, also known as Bakachyk-Kyiat
- The former name of Kalmiuske, Donetsk Oblast
- The former name of Slobozhanske, Chuhuiv Raion, Kharkiv Oblast
- The former name of Makhnivka, Khmilnyk Raion, Vinnytsia Oblast
- The former name of Blahodatne, Pervomaiske settlement hromada, Mykolaiv Raion, Mykolaiv Oblast
