= Bezimenne =

Brzimenne may refer to:

- Bezimenne, Snihurivka urban hromada, Bashtanka Raion, Mykolaiv Oblast, Ukraine
- Bezimenne, Kalmiuske Raion, Ukraine
- Bezimenne gas field
