= Maksymivka, Mykolaiv Raion, Mykolaiv Oblast =

Maksymivka Максимівка
- Village
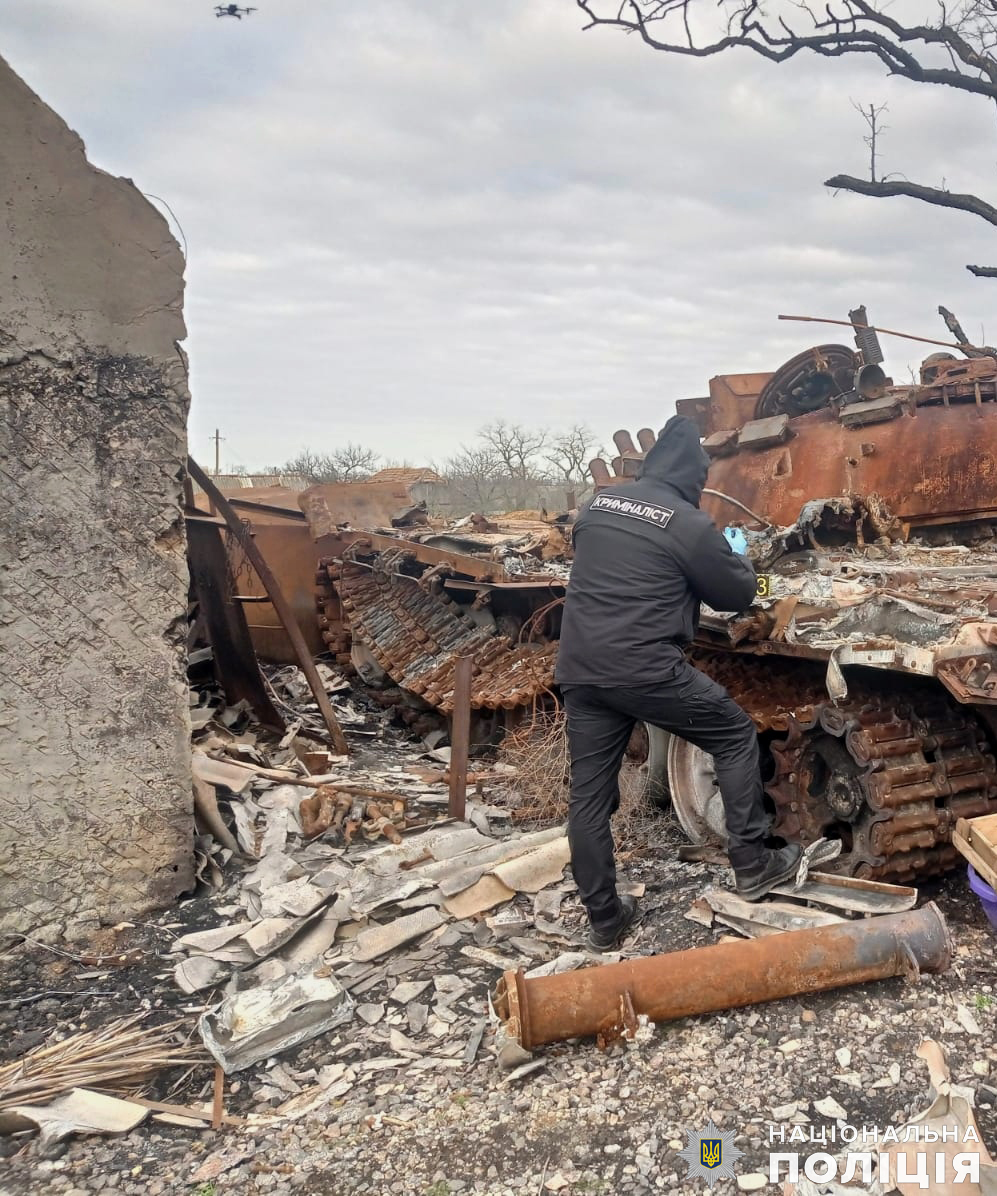

- Location within Mykolaiv Oblast Maksymivka (Ukraine)
- Coordinates: 46°57′46.9″N 32°28′53.7″E
- Country: Ukraine
- Oblast: Mykolaiv Oblast
- Raion: Mykolaiv Raion
- Established: 1801

Area
  - Total: 131 km^{2} (51 sq mi)
- Elevation: 47 m (154 ft)

Population
  - Total: <24

Maksymivka (Ukrainian: Максимівка) is a village in Mykolaiv Raion, Mykolaiv Oblast, Ukraine. The population in 2016 was 119 people. The village of Maksymivka is located 50 km east of Mykolaiv, 45 km west of Snihurivka. The body of local self-government is Kyselivka village council.

== History ==
=== Twentieth Century ===
At the beginning of the twentieth century, Maksymivka had 669 inhabitants.

=== Soviet Era ===
In 1923, Maksymivka already had 132 yards and 650 inhabitants, including 311 children under 16 years old.In the early 20s, the village became the center of the Maksymivka village council, which, in addition to Maksymivka, included the villages of Kyselivka and Burkhanivka. The New Economic Policy (NEP) gave impetus to new rural growth. Already in 1926, on October 1, 809 inhabitants lived in Maksimovka. This is the largest number of inhabitants in the history of the village. In 1923, there was one labor school in the village, "in which 20 boys and 21 girls studied as one teacher." Parents raised funds for the renovation of this school. As evidenced by the protocol of the "General meeting of citizens of the village of Maksimovka from September 20, 1924". At the same time, the Presidium of the Maksymivska village council decided to open schools for the elimination of illiteracy in each settlement that is part of the Maksymivska village council from October 1, 1924. The Nepiv period ended, and Stalin's collectivization of the village began. Maksimov peasants first organized on September 29, 1929, a TOZ called "Shevchenko's Testament". And already in 1931, a collective farm named after Lenin was organized, which included peasants from the villages of Kiselivka and Maksimovka.

The collective farmers of the village of Maksymivka survived the terrible tragedy of the Holodomor of 1932–1933. Maria Petrovna Moiseenko recalls: "in order to survive, they went to steal corn, and then they ground it on millstones and cooked porridge. In the summer we went to the field, shake up the straw, suddenly the grain falls out. We had to eat dead animals. In those years, many people starved to death." Shvets Evdokia Gerasimovna said that "We went to the hamlet, exchanged earrings and wedding rings for products. People on the way fell and died because they were hungry. ate sugar and fodder beets." Tkachenko Elena Alexandrovna (born in 1905): "In order not to die of hunger, they ate nuts, drums, dogs, hedgehogs, beets. They collected seeds from the birch tree, ground them on millstones, and then baked cakes." There is no exact data on the number of deaths in those years.

=== Nazi Occupation ===
On March 13–14, 1944, retreating under the onslaught of the Soviet army, the Nazis shot and then burned 68 villagers. Here is what Maria Petrovna, a teacher of the Maksymivska school, who witnessed these events, told about this: "On March 10, the Germans began to expel people from Maksymivka. At 10 o'clock in the morning, a German tank approached from the direction of Kyselivka and fired three shots at Maksimovka. A group of fascists in the village, after that began to expel all residents from the village. People took carts, packed some things and walked towards Kherson. Not far from the village there was a skyrta above the road. All the exiles stopped at the hermitage. In the distance, in the direction of the third department of the state farm "Krasnoye Znamya" (now the village of Vasylky), several horsemen appeared. Everyone was looking forward: who is it? Germans or ours? Finally, we recognized — this is our cavalry reconnaissance. They rushed to the Soviet soldiers, hugged them, kissed them, grabbed them by the stirrups. The scouts sent people to the third department, ours were there. It was evening. But this was seen by the fascists who were atrocious in the village of Maksimyvka. Some of them dug in to the place where the tractor brigade is now, the Nazis opened fire on the refugees. Unremembered Fyodor was killed, many were wounded, including children. The wounded were placed on wheelchairs and taken with them. When we reached the third department, it was already night. On March 14, a detachment of our scouts approached the village from the other side. People heard a loud "Hooray" and returned to the village, believing that there were no Germans in the village. But enemies ruled there. All the returning people were driven by the Nazis to a large courtyard to the hermitage. Everyone who was found near the houses was shot on the spot. The Nazis raped the girls. Then they set fire to the hermitage, near which there were people. The Nazis began to shoot old people, women, babies. People were falling into the fire, burning. Having done their black deed, the executioners fled from the village. On March 18, those who escaped at the third station returned to the village. They saw a terrible picture. There were corpses everywhere. Under her house sat a shot pregnant woman, Avramenko Halyna Yevdokymivna. People began to collect the remains of their fellow villagers. Few people could be recognized. The surviving villagers gathered, the Red Army came to the rescue. We dug a large hole. The remains of fellow villagers were buried there. 68 people were killed here. These were residents of the village of Maksymivka, evacuated families from Kherson and one unidentified person.

=== Russian Occupation ===
During the Russian Invasion of Ukraine, the village alongside surrounding areas was occupied by Russian forces. The village suffered greatly and most of the population fled leaving less than 24 people to stay. Ukrainian artillery from liberated areas drove the Russians out of the village.
