= Tsentralne, Mykolaiv Raion, Mykolaiv Oblast =

Rural locality in Mykolaiv Oblast, Ukraine

Tsentralne Центральне
- Village
- Interactive map of Tsentralne
- Location within Mykolaiv Oblast Tsentralne (Ukraine)
- Coordinates: 46°54′19.8″N 32°28′23.5″E
- Sovereign State: Ukraine
- Oblast: Mykolaiv Oblast
- Raion: Mykolaiv Raion
- Founded: 1930

Area
  - Total: 4.63 km^{2} (1.79 sq mi)
- Elevation: 44 m (144 ft)

Population (2001 census)
  - Total: 1,247
- Time zone: UTC+2 (EET)
  - Summer (DST): UTC+3 (EEST)

Tsentralne (Ukrainian: Центральне; Russian: Центральное) is a village in Mykolaiv Raion (district) of Mykolaiv Oblast (province) of southern Ukraine. In 2001, its population was 1,247 inhabitants. It belongs to Shevchenkove rural hromada, one of the hromadas of Ukraine. At present, elevation is 44 m (144 ft).

Until 18 July 2020, Tsentralne was located in Snihurivka Raion. The raion was abolished in July 2020 as part of the administrative reform of Ukraine, which reduced the number of raions of Mykolaiv Oblast to four. The area of Snihurivka Raion was merged into Bashtanka Raion, however, Tsentralne was transferred to Mykolaiv Raion.

== 2022 Russian invasion of Ukraine ==
During the 2022 Russian invasion of Ukraine, Tsentralne was captured by the Russian Armed Forces, but was subsequently liberated by the Armed Forces of Ukraine.

== See also ==
- Russian occupation of Mykolaiv Oblast
- Southern Ukraine campaign
