= Shyroke, Mykolaiv Oblast =

Settlement in Mykolaiv Oblast, Ukraine

Shyroke Широке
- Interactive map of Shyroke
- Location of Shyroke within Ukraine Shyroke (Ukraine)
- Coordinates: 47.098611°N 32.671389°E
- Country: Ukraine
- Oblast: Mykolaiv Oblast
- Raion: Bashtanka Raion
- Founded: 1947

Area
  - Total: 0.06 km^{2} (0.023 sq mi)
- Elevation: 58 m (190 ft)

Population (2001 census)
  - Total: 779
  - Density: 13,000/km^{2} (34,000/sq mi)
- Time zone: UTC+2 (EET)
  - Summer (DST): UTC+3 (EEST)
- Postal code: 57324
- Area code: +380 5162

Shyroke (Ukrainian: Широке; Russian: Широкое) is a rural settlement in Bashtanka Raion (district) in Mykolaiv Oblast of southern Ukraine, at about 54.9 kilometres (34.1 mi) east-northeast from the centre of Mykolaiv city. It hosts the administration of Shyroke rural hromada, one of the hromadas of Ukraine.

Until 18 July 2020, Shyroke belonged to Snihurivka Raion. The raion was abolished that day as part of the administrative reform of Ukraine, which reduced the number of raions of Mykolaiv Oblast to four. The area of Snihurivka Raion was merged into Bashtanka Raion.

Russian forces entered Mykolaiv Oblast during the 2022 Russian Invasion of Ukraine. On 27 April 2022, Ukrainian government official Anton Gerashchenko announced that Ukrainian forces had taken control of Shyroke and the nearby villages of Novopetrivka and Liubyne.
