= Novomykolaivka, Pervomaiske settlement hromada, Mykolaiv Raion, Mykolaiv Oblast =

Rural locality in Mykolaiv Oblast, Ukraine

Novomykolaivka Новомиколаївка
- Location in Ukraine Novomykolaivka (Mykolaiv Oblast)
- Coordinates: 46°57′52″N 32°21′37″E
- Country: Ukraine
- Oblast: Mykolaiv Oblast
- Raion: Mykolaiv Raion
- Established: 1885
- Elevation: 51 m (167 ft)
- Area code: +380 512

Novomykolaivka (Ukrainian: Новомиколаївка) is a village in Mykolaiv Raion of the Mykolaiv Oblast. It belongs to Pervomaiske settlement hromada, one of the hromadas of Ukraine.

Until 18 July 2020, Novomykolaivka belonged to Vitovka Raion. The raion was abolished in July 2020 as part of the administrative reform of Ukraine, which reduced the number of raions of Mykolaiv Oblast to four. The area of Vitovka Raion was merged into Mykolaiv Raion.

== Language ==
Distribution of population by native language according to the 2001 census:

Language	Percentage
Ukrainian	91.82 %
Russian	6.80 %
Moldovan	0.52 %
Belarusian	0.26 %
Armenian	0.09 %
Other	0.51 %
