= Bezimenne, Mykolaiv Oblast =

Village in Mykolaiv Oblast, Ukraine

Bezimenne Безіменне
- Village
- Interactive map of Bezimenne
- Coordinates: 47.100°N 33.116°E
- Country: Ukraine
- Oblast: Mykolaiv Oblast
- Raion: Bashtanka Raion

Area
  - Total: 0.045 km^{2} (0.017 sq mi)
- Elevation: 139 m (456 ft)

Population (2001 census)
  - Total: 174
  - Density: 3,900/km^{2} (10,000/sq mi)
- Time zone: UTC+2 (EET)
  - Summer (DST): UTC+3 (EEST)
- Postal code: 57316
- Area code: +380 5162

Bezimenne (Ukrainian: Безіменне; Russian: Безыменное) is a village in Bashtanka Raion (district) in Mykolaiv Oblast of southern Ukraine, at about 85.7 kilometres (53.3 mi) east-northeast (ENE) of the centre of Mykolaiv city. It belongs to Snihurivka urban hromada, one of the hromadas of Ukraine.

The village came under attack by Russian forces in 2022, during the Russian invasion of Ukraine, and was regained by Ukrainian forces by the end of October the same year.
