= Zavodske, Mykolaiv Oblast =

Rural locality in Mykolaiv Oblast, Ukraine

Zavodske Заводське
- Rural settlement
- Interactive map of Zavodske
- Location within Mykolaiv Oblast Location within Ukraine
- Coordinates: 47°2′36″N 32°26′10″E
- Country: Ukraine
- Oblast: Mykolaiv Oblast
- Raion: Mykolaiv Raion
- Hromada: Pervomaiske settlement hromada

Population (2022)
  - Total: 2,638
- Time zone: UTC+2 (EET)
  - Summer (DST): UTC+3 (EEST)

Zavodske (Ukrainian: Заводське), formerly Pervomaiske (Ukrainian: Первомайське; Russian: Первомайское), is a rural settlement in southern Ukraine, locating in Mykolaiv Raion of Mykolaiv Oblast. It hosts the administration of Pervomaiske settlement hromada, one of the hromadas of Ukraine. Population: 2,638 (2022 estimate).

The settlement is located on the right bank of the Bilozerka River. The Dnieper–Inhulets Canal passes just south of the settlement.

== History ==
The settlement was founded in the beginning of the 20th century as the selo of Zasillia to serve the railway station of the same name.

In 1939, Mykolaiv Rural Raion (sometimes referred to as Mykolaiv Raion) was established in Mykolaiv Oblast with the center in the city of Mykolaiv. On 12 September 1944, Mykolaiv Raion was renamed Zhovtneve Raion, and the administrative center of the raion was transferred from Mykolaiv to the town of Zhovtneve. In 1965, Pervomaiske was given urban-type settlement status. On 19 May 2016, Zhovtneve Raion was renamed Vitovka Raion conform to the law prohibiting names of Communist origin.

Until 18 July 2020, Pervomaiske belonged to Vitovka Raion. The raion was abolished in July 2020 as part of the administrative reform of Ukraine, which reduced the number of raions of Mykolaiv Oblast to four. The area of Vitovka Raion was merged into Mykolaiv Raion. On 26 January 2024, a new law entered into force which abolished the status of urban-type settlement status, and Pervomaiske became a rural settlement.

On 18 June 2025, the Verkhovna Rada renamed the rural settlement to Zavodske as part of the derussification campaign.

== Economy ==
=== Transportation ===
The closest railway station is in Zasillia, 2 kilometres (1.2 mi) southwest of the settlement, on the railway line connecting Mykolaiv and Snihurivka.
