= Liubomyrivka, Mykolaiv Raion, Mykolaiv Oblast =

Rural settlement in Mykolaiv Oblast, Ukraine

Liubomyrivka Любомирівка
- Rural settlement
- Location of Liubomyrivka Liubomyrivka (Ukraine)
- Coordinates: 46°53′19″N 32°22′32″E
- Country: Ukraine
- Oblast: Mykolaiv Oblast
- Raion: Mykolaiv Raion
- Elevation: 47 m (154 ft)

Population (2001)
  - Total: 620
- Postal code: 57360
- Area code: +380 5162
- Climate: Cfa

Liubomyrivka (Ukrainian: Любомирівка), known as Krasne Znamia (Ukrainian: Красне Знам'я) until 2016, is a rural settlement in Mykolaiv Raion, Mykolaiv Oblast, Ukraine. It belongs to Shevchenkove rural hromada, one of the hromadas of Ukraine.

Until 18 July 2020, Liubomyrivka was located in Snihurivka Raion. The raion was abolished in July 2020 as part of the administrative reform of Ukraine, which reduced the number of raions of Mykolaiv Oblast to four. The area of Snihurivka Raion was merged into Bashtanka Raion, however, Liubomyrivka was transferred to Mykolaiv Raion.
