= Barativka, Bashtanka Raion, Mykolaiv Oblast =

Village in Mykolaiv Oblast, Ukraine

Barativka Баратівка
- Village
- Interactive map of Barativka
- Location of Barativka within Ukraine Barativka (Ukraine)
- Coordinates: 46.946111°N 32.781111°E
- Country: Ukraine
- Oblast: Mykolaiv Oblast
- Raion: Bashtanka Raion
- Founded: 1864
- Elevation: 15 m (49 ft)

Population (2001 census)
  - Total: 1,088
- Time zone: UTC+2 (EET)
  - Summer (DST): UTC+3 (EEST)
- Postal code: 57370
- Area code: +380 5162

Barativka (Ukrainian: Баратівка; Russian: Баратовка) is a village in Bashtanka Raion (district) in Mykolaiv Oblast of southern Ukraine, at about 50 kilometres (31 mi) east from the centre of Mykolaiv city. It belongs to Horokhivske rural hromada, one of the hromadas of Ukraine.

Until 18 July 2020, Barativka belonged to Snihurivka Raion. The raion was abolished that day as part of the administrative reform of Ukraine, which reduced the number of raions of Mykolaiv Oblast to four. The area of Snihurivka Raion was merged into Bashtanka Raion.

The village was occupied by Russian forces in 2022, during the Russian invasion of Ukraine.
