= Oleksandrivka, Horokhivske rural hromada, Bashtanka Raion, Mykolaiv Oblast =

Village in Mykolaiv Oblast, Ukraine

Oleksandrivka Олександрівка
- Village
- Interactive map of Oleksandrivka
- Location of Oleksandrivka within Ukraine Oleksandrivka (Ukraine)
- Coordinates: 46.837222°N 32.760833°E
- Country: Ukraine
- Oblast: Mykolaiv Oblast
- Raion: Bashtanka Raion
- Founded Status: 1812
- Elevation: 34 m (112 ft)

Population (2001 census)
  - Total: 1,336
- Time zone: UTC+2 (EET)
  - Summer (DST): UTC+3 (EEST)
- Postal code: 57375
- Area code: +380 5162

Oleksandrivka (Ukrainian: Олександрівка) is a village near the Mykolaiv-Kherson Oblast border. It is located within Bashtanka Raion of Mykolaiv Oblast. It belongs to Horokhivske rural hromada, one of the hromadas of Ukraine. The population was 1,336 as of 2001.

== History ==
Oleksandrivka was first founded in 1812, under the name Roksandrivka, with the first inhabitants being serfs.

In 1886, 314 people lived in the village which at the time was part of the Kherson governorate (Russian Empire).

After World War II, the village was renamed to Hausena and cotton was grown.

Until 18 July 2020, Barativka belonged to Snihurivka Raion. The raion was abolished that day as part of the administrative reform of Ukraine, which reduced the number of raions of Mykolaiv Oblast to four. The area of Snihurivka Raion was merged into Bashtanka Raion.

During the 2022 Russian Invasion of Ukraine, the village was extensively shelled, and later occupied by Russia. It was liberated by Ukrainian forces as a part of its southern counteroffensive on November 11, 2022.
