= Lupareve =

Village in Mykolaiv Oblast, Ukraine

Lupareve Лупареве
- Village
- Interactive map of Lupareve
- Location of Lupareve within Ukraine Lupareve (Ukraine)
- Coordinates: 46.696944°N 31.979444°E
- Country: Ukraine
- Oblast: Mykolaiv Oblast
- Raion: Mykolaiv Raion

Area
  - Total: 0.936 km^{2} (0.361 sq mi)
- Elevation: 6 m (20 ft)

Population (2001 census)
  - Total: 1,268
  - Density: 1,350/km^{2} (3,510/sq mi)
- Time zone: UTC+2 (EET)
  - Summer (DST): UTC+3 (EEST)
- Postal code: 57287
- Area code: +380 512

Lupareve (Ukrainian: Лупареве; Russian: Лупарево) is a village in Mykolaiv Raion (district) in Mykolaiv Oblast of southern Ukraine, at about 24.6 kilometres (15.3 mi) south by west from the centre of Mykolaiv city. It belongs to Halytsynove rural hromada, one of the hromadas of Ukraine.

Until 18 July 2020, Lupareve belonged to Vitovka Raion. The raion was abolished in July 2020 as part of the administrative reform of Ukraine, which reduced the number of raions of Mykolaiv Oblast to four. The area of Vitovka Raion was merged into Mykolaiv Raion.

The village came under attack by Russian forces in 2022, during the Russian invasion of Ukraine.
