= Yuriy Barbashov =

Ukrainian politician, head of Mikolayiv Military-Civilian Administration since 2022

- Юрий Владиславович Барбашов; Юрій Владиславович Барбашов

Head of the Mykolaiv Military-Civil Administration
- In office Disputed: 13 August – 30 September 2022 (Note: Control over Mykolaiv Oblast was disputed due to the 2022 Russian invasion of Ukraine during this period. Barbashov was installed by Russia, while Vitalii Kim was loyal to the Ukrainian government.)
- Preceded by: Administration established
- Succeeded by: Administration dissolved

Personal details
- Born: 21 March 1975 (age 50) Mykolaiv, Ukrainian SSR, Soviet Union

Military service
- Allegiance: Ukraine; Russia; Donetsk People's Republic, Luhansk People's Republic

Yuriy Vladislavovich Barbashov (Note: Ukrainian: Юрій Владиславович Барбашов, romanized: Yuriy Vladyslavovych Barbashov; Russian: Юрий Владиславович Барбашов) is a Russian politician and nominal head of the collaborationist Russian Mykolaiv Military civilian administration.

== Biography ==
Yuriy Barbashov was born in Mykolaiv, Ukraine. In 1998, he graduated from the Admiral Makarov University of Shipbuilding in Mykolaiv. Since 2013, he has been involved with Anti-Maidan movements and protests as well as supporting the Novorossiya project. In 2014, he moved to the Luhansk People's Republic, where he participated in rallies with Oleg Tsarov, and later to the Donetsk People's Republic. In the latter, he joined the Militsiya and also became an employee of the public broadcaster. In 2021, he participated in peace negotiations in Minsk as part of the LPR delegation. He has appeared many times in the Russian media, he also ran his own channel on Telegram and a YouTube channel with the same name, mainly presenting pro-Russian views to the audience. Since 2017, Ukraine is investigating him in a terrorist case.

=== 2022 Russian invasion of Ukraine ===
During the 2022 Russian invasion of Ukraine, Yuriy Barbashov supported pro-Russian activity in the Mykolaiv Oblast. He created a website where he displayed pro-Russian propaganda, which was later hacked and shut down by Ukrainian hackers. After Russian forces failed to occupy Mykolaiv Oblast, the Mykolaiv Military Civilian Administration was created with its headquarters being in Snihurivka. Barbashov helped Russian forces capture small villages near Snihurivka and was appointed as governor of the Mykolaiv MCA. His administration was preparing a referendum to join Russia. On 11 September, following a major Ukrainian counteroffensive, it was announced that the proposed annexation referendum would be "indefinitely" postponed. On 11 November Ukrainian forces regained control of almost all of Mykolaiv Oblast with only the Kinburn Peninsula remaining under Russian occupation.

== See also ==
- Collaboration with Russia during the Russian invasion of Ukraine
