= Ukrainka, Halytsynove rural hromada, Mykolaiv Raion, Mykolaiv Oblast =

Village in Mykolaiv Oblast, Ukraine

Ukrainka Українка
- Location of Ukrainka Ukrainka (Ukraine)
- Coordinates: 46°49′32″N 32°08′28″E
- Country: Ukraine
- Oblast: Mykolaiv Oblast
- Raion: Mykolaiv Raion

Population (2001)
  - Total: 1,170
- Postal code: 57263
- Area code: +380 512
- Climate: Cfa

Ukrainka (Ukrainian: Українка) is a village in Mykolaiv Raion, Mykolaiv Oblast (province) of Ukraine. It belongs to Halytsynove rural hromada, one of the hromadas of Ukraine.

Until 18 July 2020, Ukrainka was located in Vitovka Raion. The raion was abolished in July 2020 as part of the administrative reform of Ukraine, which reduced the number of raions of Mykolaiv Oblast to four. The area of Vitovka Raion was merged into Mykolaiv Raion.
