= Komisarivka, Mykolaiv Oblast =

Rural locality in Mykolaiv Oblast, Ukraine

Komisarivka Комісарівка
- Village
- Location of Komisarivka within Mykolaiv Oblast#Location of Komisarivka within Ukraine Komisarivka (Ukraine)
- Coordinates: 47°01′10″N 31°18′17″E
- Country: Ukraine
- Oblast: Mykolaiv Oblast
- District: Mykolaiv Raion
- Elevation: 52 m (171 ft)

Population (2001)
  - Total: 660
- Time zone: UTC+2 (EET)
  - Summer (DST): UTC+3 (EEST)
- Postal code: 57420
- Area code: +380 5153

Komisarivka (Ukrainian: Комісарівка) is a village in Mykolaiv Raion (district) in Mykolaiv Oblast of southern Ukraine.

Until 18 July 2020, Komisarivka was located in Berezanka Raion. The raion was abolished in July 2020 as part of the administrative reform of Ukraine, which reduced the number of raions of Mykolaiv Oblast to four. The area of Berezanka Raion was merged into Mykolaiv Raion.
