= Novopetrivka, Shyroke rural hromada, Bashtanka Raion, Mykolaiv Oblast =

Rural locality in Mykolaiv Oblast, Ukraine

Novopetrivka Новопетрівка
- Village
- Location within Ukraine Novopetrivka (Ukraine)
- Coordinates: 47°03′23″N 32°40′11″E
- Country: Ukraine
- Oblast: Mykolaiv Oblast
- Raion: Bashtanka Raion
- Established: 1862
- Elevation: 44 m (144 ft)

Population
  - Total: 1,722
- Postal code: 57330

Novopetrivka (Ukrainian: Новопетрівка), formerly known as Dar-Oleksandrivka (Ukrainian: Дар-Олександрівка) is a village in Bashtanka Raion of Mykolaiv Oblast (region). It belongs to Shyroke rural hromada, one of the hromadas of Ukraine.

== Geography ==
On the southern outskirts of the village, the Krynychna Chebanka river flows into the Verevchyna river.

== History ==
As of 1886, 280 people lived in the village. It was formerly part of the Kherson governorate and there were 51 yard farms, and there were 2 benches.

Until 18 July 2020, Novopetrivka belonged to Snihurivka Raion. The raion was abolished that day as part of the administrative reform of Ukraine, which reduced the number of raions of Mykolaiv Oblast to four. The area of Snihurivka Raion was merged into Bashtanka Raion.

=== 2022 Russian invasion of Ukraine ===
Russian forces entered Mykolaiv Oblast during the 2022 Russian Invasion of Ukraine. On 27 April 2022, Ukrainian government official Anton Gerashchenko announced that Ukrainian forces had taken control of Novopetrivka and the nearby villages of Shyroke and Liubyne.
