= Serhii Khlan =

Ukrainian politician

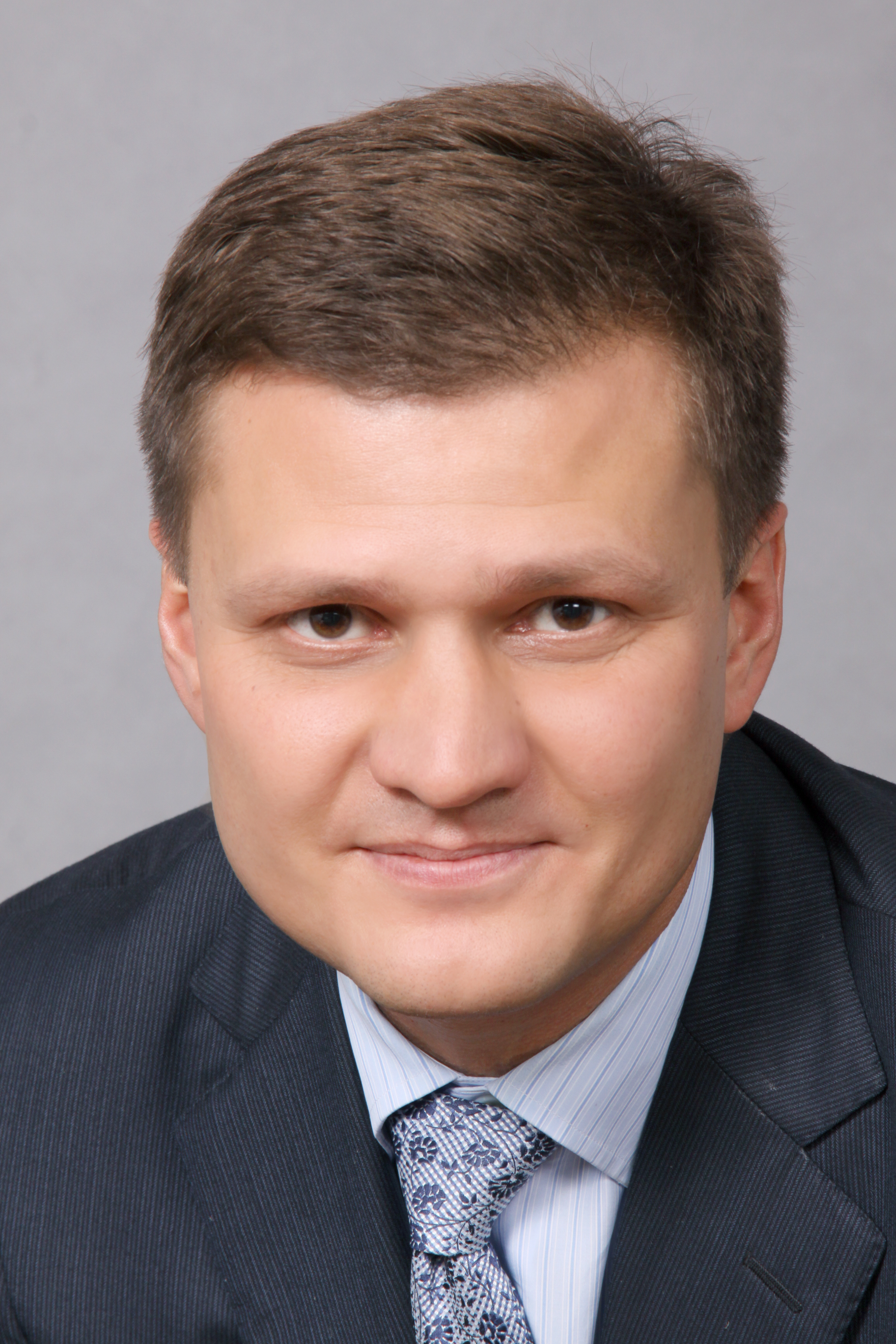

Serhii Volodymyrovych Khlan (born 29 June 1972; Ukrainian: Сергій Володимирович Хлань) is a Ukrainian politician. He was born in Snihurivka, Mykolaiv Oblast. In 2020, Khlan became a member of the Kherson Oblast Council for Petro Poroshenko's party European Solidarity. He left the party in 2023.

== Biography ==
=== Education ===
In 1994, he graduated from the Mykolayiv Pedagogical Institute specializing in mathematics and physics teacher, and in 2012 from the National University of Shipbuilding named after Admiral Makarov specializing in organizational management.

=== Career ===
From 1993 to 2004, he worked at secondary school No. 57 in Mykolaiv as a mathematics teacher. Starting in 2000, he began entrepreneurial activities, founding several agricultural enterprises, which he consolidated in 2010 into the agro-industrial complex "ZlatoDar" centered in Kakhovka, Kherson region.

=== Political activity ===
In 2010, he was a candidate for the Kherson Regional Council from the party «Strong Ukraine» Serhiy Tigipko.

In 2012, he ran for the national parliament from the party «Ukraine – Forward!» Nataliya Korolevska's in district 185. He finished second, losing to the candidate from the «Party of Regions» Mykhailo Opanaschenko with 21.23% of the votes.

Since the beginning of the Revolution of Dignity in 2013, he was part of the Kakhovka united resistance headquarters. In the 2014 early presidential elections, he was a trusted representative for P. Poroshenko in the 188 electoral district.

In 2013, he advocated for the redistribution of resources in favor of local communities, therefore supporting the decentralization by Petro Poroshenko.

In the Verkhovna Rada, he is part of the Committee on Agrarian Policy and Land Relations, focusing on the development of irrigation systems. His first legislative proposal resulted in a ban on the privatization of the Kakhovka Main Canal.

In Kakhovka in 2015, during a session of the newly elected city council, MP from the BPP, Serhiy Khlan, threw a sausage at a deputy from the "Opposition Bloc," Pavlo Filipchuk.

He campaigned against the presidential race favorite Volodymyr Zelenskyy, promising him impeachment.

During his tenure in the Verkhovna Rada, his assets increased nearly 300 times, which Serhiy Khlan explained by the difference between paper and electronic declarations.

=== Personal life ===
Divorced, raising five children.
