= Ternovi Pody =

Rural locality in Mykolaiv Oblast, Ukraine

Ternovi Pody Тернові Поди
- Interactive map of Ternovi Pody
- Location of Ternovi Pody within Ukraine Ternovi Pody (Ukraine)
- Coordinates: 46°51′32″N 32°23′7″E
- Country: Ukraine
- Oblast: Mykolaiv Oblast
- Raion: Mykolaiv Raion
- First Settled: 1876

Area
  - Total: 723.27 km^{2} (279.26 sq mi)
- Elevation: 43 m (141 ft)

Population
  - Total: 165
- Area code: +380 5162

Ternovi Pody (Ukrainian: Тернові Поди) is a settlement in Mykolaiv Raion of Mykolaiv Oblast, Ukraine. It is part of Lyubomyriv Village Council. It belongs to Shevchenkove rural hromada, one of the hromadas of Ukraine. Ternovi Pody has an elevation of 43 m. It has a population of 165 people.

Until 18 July 2020, Ternovi Pody was located in Snihurivka Raion. The raion was abolished in July 2020 as part of the administrative reform of Ukraine, which reduced the number of raions of Mykolaiv Oblast to four. The area of Snihurivka Raion was merged into Bashtanka Raion, however, Ternovi Pody was transferred to Mykolaiv Raion.
