= Blahodatne, Pervomaiske settlement hromada, Mykolaiv Raion, Mykolaiv Oblast =

Rural locality in Mykolaiv Oblast, Ukraine

Blahodatne Благодатне
- Village
- Location in Ukraine Blahodatne (Mykolaiv Oblast)
- Coordinates: 47°1′57″N 32°32′50″E
- Country: Ukraine
- Oblast: Mykolaiv Oblast
- Raion: Mykolaiv Raion
- Established: 1939

Area
  - Total: 1.64 km^{2} (0.63 sq mi)
- Elevation: 55 m (180 ft)

Population
  - Total: 474

Blahodatne (Ukrainian: Благодатне) is a village in the Mykolaiv Raion of the Mykolaiv Oblast. It belongs to Pervomaiske settlement hromada, one of the hromadas of Ukraine. There are 474 inhabitants as of 2001.

== History ==
The village was founded in 1939 under the original name Komsomolske.

On May 12, 2016, the village of Komsomolske was renamed Blahodatne.

Until 18 July 2020, Blahodatne belonged to Vitovka Raion. The raion was abolished in July 2020 as part of the administrative reform of Ukraine, which reduced the number of raions of Mykolaiv Oblast to four. The area of Vitovka Raion was merged into Mykolaiv Raion.

During the 2022 Russian Invasion of Ukraine, the village came under attack and was occupied by Russian forces on 22 August 2022.
