= Snihurivka =

City in Mykolaiv Oblast, Ukraine

Snihurivka Снігурівка
- City
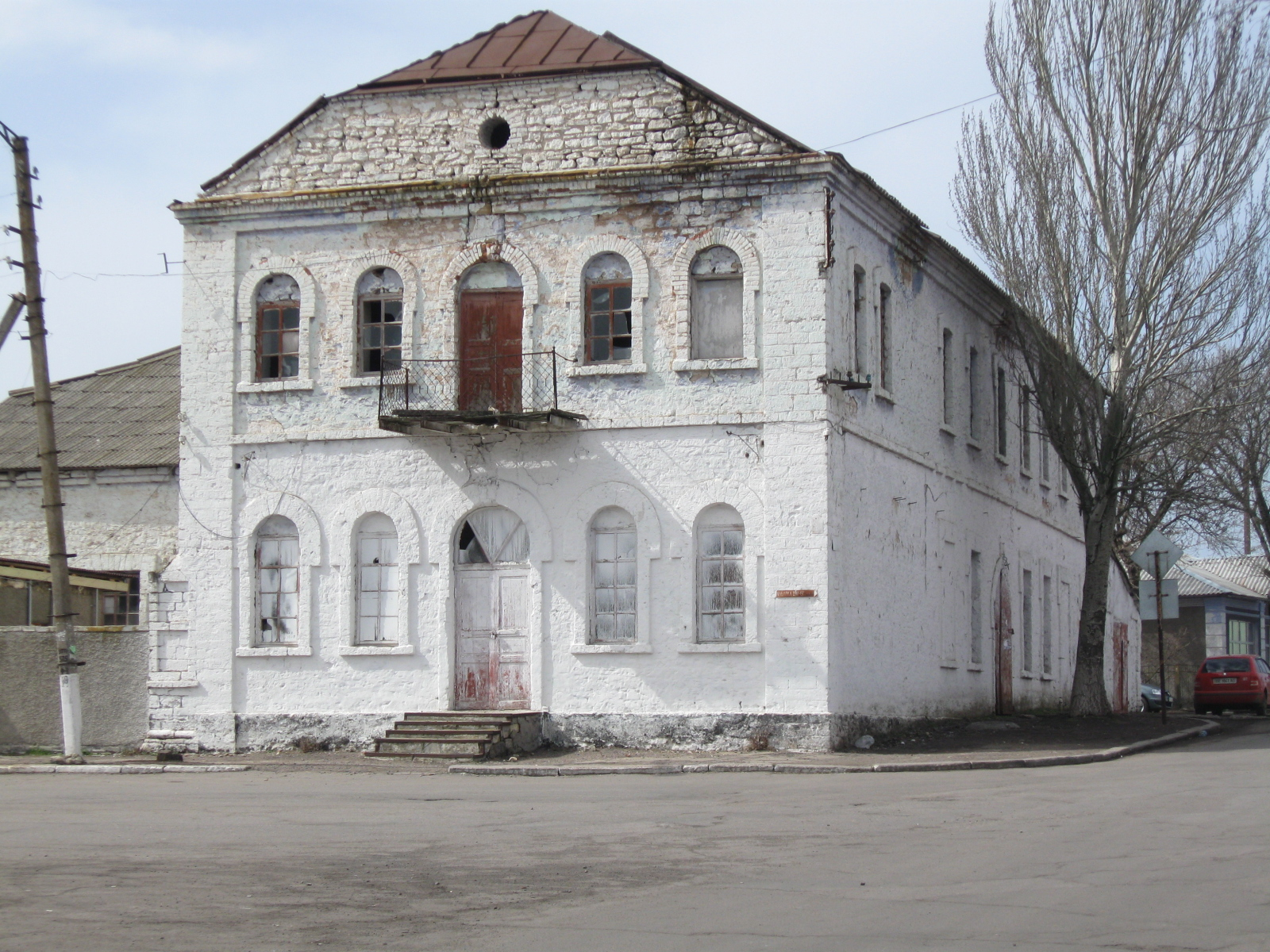
- Old mill in Snihurivka

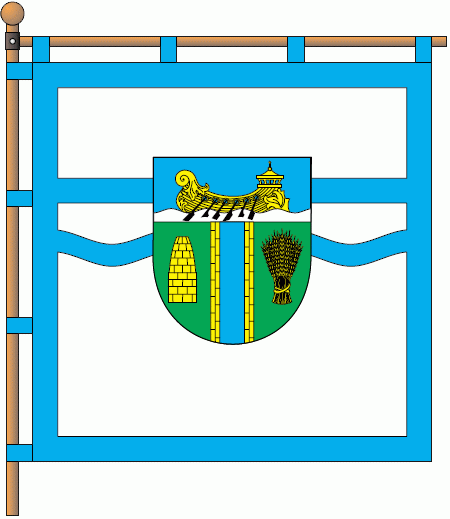
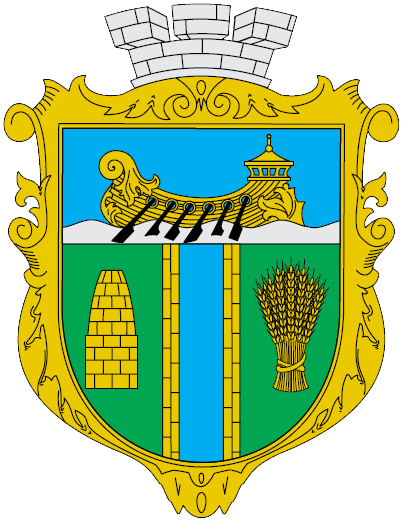
- Flag Coat of arms
- Interactive map of Snihurivka
- Location of Snihurivka Snihurivka (Ukraine)
- Coordinates: 47°4′25″N 32°48′00″E
- Country: Ukraine
- Oblast: Mykolaiv Oblast
- Raion: Bashtanka Raion
- Hromada: Snihurivka urban hromada
- Founded: 1812
- City rights: 1961

Government
  - Mayor: Oleksandr Larchenko

Area
  - Total: 7.58 km^{2} (2.93 sq mi)

Population (2022)
  - Total: 12,045
  - Estimate (2023): 5,865
  - Density: 1,590/km^{2} (4,120/sq mi)
- Postal code: 57309
- Area code: +380-5162
- Website: http://snigiryevka-rada.gov.ua/

Snihurivka (Ukrainian: Снігурівка [s⁽ʲ⁾n⁽ʲ⁾iɦʊˈr⁽ʲ⁾iu̯kɐ]) is a small city in Bashtanka Raion, Mykolaiv Oblast, in southern Ukraine. It hosts the administration of Snihurivka urban hromada. Population: 12,045 (2022 estimate).

It was occupied by Russia from 19 March 2022 until 10 November 2022.

== History ==
Snihurivka was founded in 1812 by peasant settlers from the Mogilev Province (modern-day Belarus). Located in the Mykolaiv Oblast of Ukraine, the settlement grew into a major transportation and agricultural center following the arrival of the railway in 1916, and officially received city status in 1956.

Snihurivka was a settlement in Kherson uyezd in Kherson Governorate of the Russian Empire. During the Ukrainian War of Independence, from 1917 to 1920, it passed between various factions. Afterwards it was administratively part of the Mykolaiv Governorate of Ukraine.

During World War II the settlement was captured by German troops in 1941 and liberated by Soviet forces in the Bereznegovatoye–Snigirevka offensive of March 1944. The Germans operated a Nazi prison in the settlement. Between 30 and 100 Jews from Snihurivka and nearby localities were murdered by Germans in the vicinity of the town in late September 1941.

It gained city status in 1961.

Until 18 July 2020, Snihurivka was the administrative center of Snihurivka Raion. The raion was abolished that day as part of the administrative reform of Ukraine, which reduced the number of raions of Mykolaiv Oblast to four. The area of Snihurivka Raion was merged into Bashtanka Raion.

=== 2022 Russian invasion of Ukraine ===
During the 2022 Russian invasion of Ukraine, Snihurivka was shelled and was reportedly occupied by Russian forces starting 19 March 2022. Snihurivka is a critical transportation hub with highways and railroad lines, connecting Snihurivka with the neighboring oblast capital Kherson.

In September 2022, following a referendum widely considered to have been staged, there were conflicting reports and rumors about the status of Snihurivka due to its vicinity near the front line, framing the attrition warfare as a retreat. On 5 October 2022, Mykolaiv Military Civilian Administration Head Yuriy Barbashov stated on Telegram that "Snihurivka remains under the control of Russian troops", while Mykolaiv Oblast Governor Vitalii Kim noted that officials were "seeking to confirm that Russian officers have left but there are troops still remaining there". On 9 November, the Russian Defense Minister Sergei Shoigu announced the withdrawal of Russian forces from the right bank of the Dnieper River. The next day, Ukrainian forces re-entered the town and raised the Ukrainian flag.

After liberation, Ukrainian state news agency Ukrinform reported that the bodies of 27 dead civilians had been found in individual graves in Snihurivka, all with signs of violent death such as bullet wounds or explosive injuries. Criminal investigations were initiated.

== Transportation ==
The Snihurivka railway station was built in 1911 as part of the Odesa Railway. The railway station was allegedly burned down by Russian troops in 2022 during the occupation.

== Demographics ==
Recent population estimates or census results:

Historical population
Year	Pop.	±%
1975	17,000	—
1989	17,506	+3.0%
2013	13,131	−25.0%
2021	12,307	−6.3%

According to the 2001 Ukrainian census, the town had a population of 15,396. The ethnic and linguistic composition was as follows:

Ethnic groups in Snihurivka
	percent
Ukrainians	87.85%
Russians	8.87%
Belarusians	1.51%
Moldovans	0.55%
Armenians	0.16%
Bulgarians	0.10%
Poles	0.10%

Native languages in Snihurivka
Languages	percent
Ukrainian	86.6%
Russian	14.4%
Moldovan	0.3%
Belarusian	0.3%
Armenian	0.1%
Romani	0.1%
others	0.2%

== Notable people from Snihurivka ==
- Serhii Khlan (born 1972), Ukrainian politician (European Solidarity), who serves as a member of the Kherson Oblast Council
