= Shevchenkove, Shevchenkove rural hromada, Mykolaiv Raion, Mykolaiv Oblast =

Village in Mykolaiv Oblast, Ukraine

Shevchenkove Шевченкове
- Location of Shevchenkove Shevchenkove (Ukraine)
- Coordinates: 46°51′36″N 32°11′47″E
- Country: Ukraine
- Oblast: Mykolaiv Oblast
- Raion: Mykolaiv Raion

Population (2001)
  - Total: 3,150
- Postal code: 57263
- Area code: +380 512
- Climate: Cfa

Shevchenkove (Ukrainian: Шевченкове) is a village in Mykolaiv Raion, Mykolaiv Oblast (province) of Ukraine. It hosts the administration of Shevchenkove rural hromada, one of the hromadas of Ukraine.

Until 18 July 2020, Shevchenkove was located in Vitovka Raion. The raion was abolished in July 2020 as part of the administrative reform of Ukraine, which reduced the number of raions of Mykolaiv Oblast to four. The area of Vitovka Raion was merged into Mykolaiv Raion.
