= Snihurivka Raion =

Former subdivision of Mykolaiv Oblast, Ukraine

Snihurivka Raion Снігурівський район
- Raion
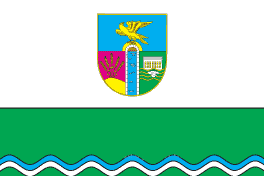
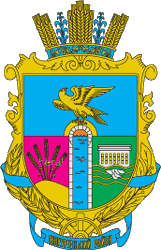
- Flag Coat of arms

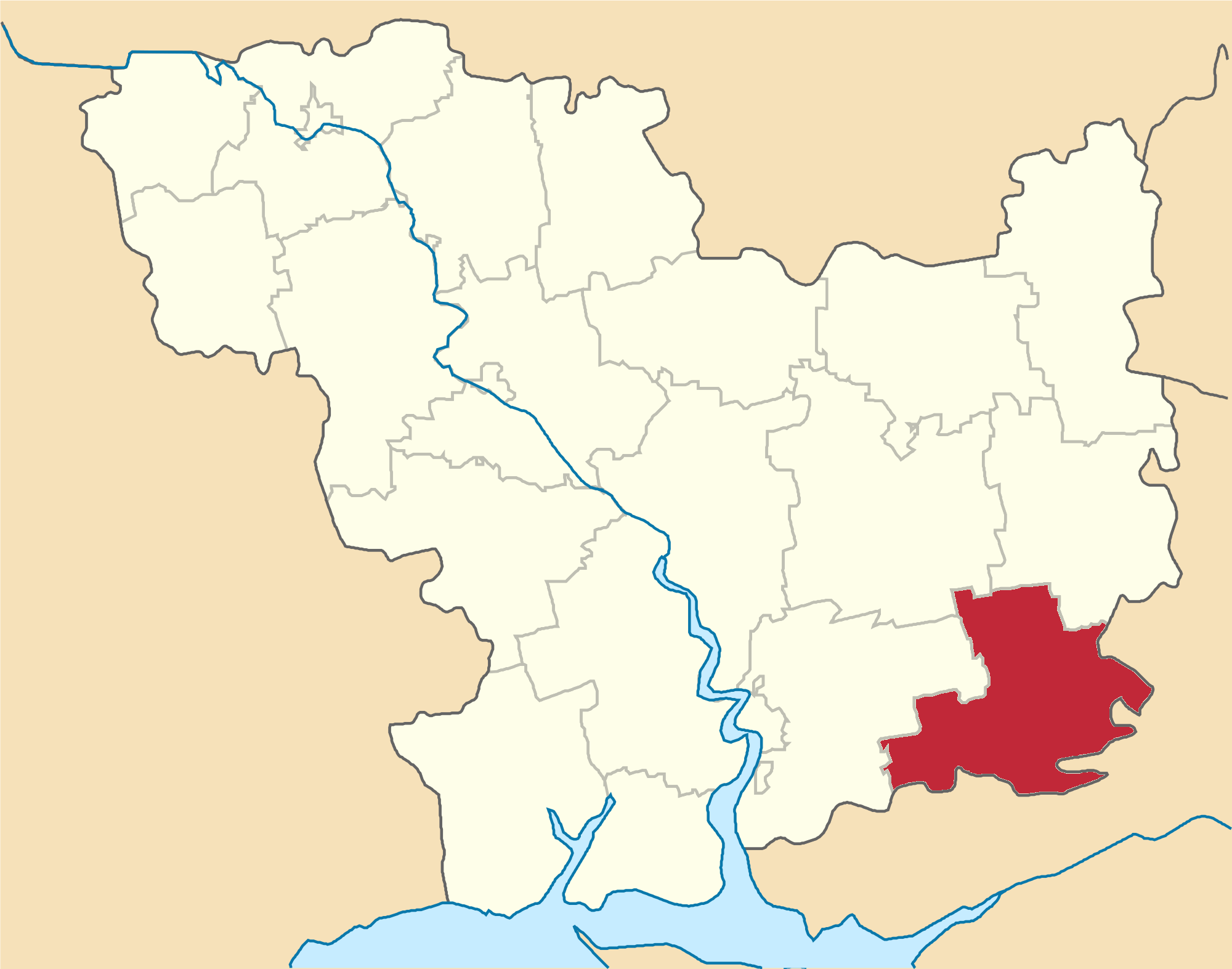
- Coordinates: 46°59′51″N 32°42′4″E
- Country: Ukraine
- Oblast: Mykolaiv Oblast
- Established: 1923
- Disestablished: 18 July 2020
- Admin. center: Snihurivka
- Subdivisions: List: 1 — city councils; 0 — settlement councils; 19 — rural councils; Number of localities: 1 — cities; 0 — urban-type settlements; 46 — villages; 12 — rural settlements

Government
  - Governor: Sergiy Kulazhin

Area
  - Total: 1,395 km^{2} (539 sq mi)

Population (2020)
  - Total: 38,849 ▼
  - Density: 27.85/km^{2} (72.13/sq mi)
- Time zone: UTC+02:00 (EET)
  - Summer (DST): UTC+03:00 (EEST)
- Postal index: 57300—57378
- Area code: +380 5162

Snihurivka Raion (Ukrainian: Снігурівський район) was a subdivision of Mykolaiv Oblast of Ukraine. Its administrative center was the town of Snihurivka. The raion was abolished on 18 July 2020 as part of the administrative reform of Ukraine, which reduced the number of raions of Mykolaiv Oblast to four. The area of Snihurivka Raion was merged into Bashtanka Raion. The last estimate of the raion population was 38,849 (2020 est.)

At the time of disestablishment, the raion consisted of three hromadas,

- Horokhivske rural hromada with the administration in the selo of Horokhivske;
- Shyroke rural hromada with the administration in the selo of Shyroke;
- Snihurivka urban hromada with the administration in Snihurivka.

== Russian re-establishment and annexation ==
During the 2022 Russian invasion of Ukraine, Snihurivka was occupied by Russian forces starting from the 19th of March 2022.

Snihurivka Raion as a raion of illegally annexed Kherson Oblast. Russian territorial claim since 30 September 2022.

In August 2022, Russia decided to re-establish Snihurivka Raion and to transfer it to Kherson Oblast, with Yuriy Barbashov being appointed as the head of the military-civilian administration of Snihurivka Raion. In this capacity, Snihurivka Raion was included in the illegal annexation referendum of Kherson Oblast in September 2022, with the local Russian-appointed authorities participating in the process. A group of locals however protested against the referendum.

On 5 October 2022, Yuriy Barbashov stated on Telegram that "Snihurivka remains under the control of Russian troops", while Mykolaiv Oblast Governor Vitalii Kim noted that officials were "seeking to confirm that Russian officers have left but there are troops still remaining there".

Snihurivka Raion as part of the illegally annexed Kherson Oblast, with the frontline at the day of the annexation by Russia.

On the 9th of November, the Russian Defense Minister Sergei Shoigu announced the withdrawal of Russian forces from the right bank of the Dnipro River. As a consequence, Snihurivka Raion was retaken by Ukrainian troops the next day. Russia however still claims the whole territory of what they consider to be Kherson Oblast.
