= Vitovka Raion =

Former subdivision of Mykolaiv Oblast, Ukraine

Vitovka Raion Вітовський район
- Raion
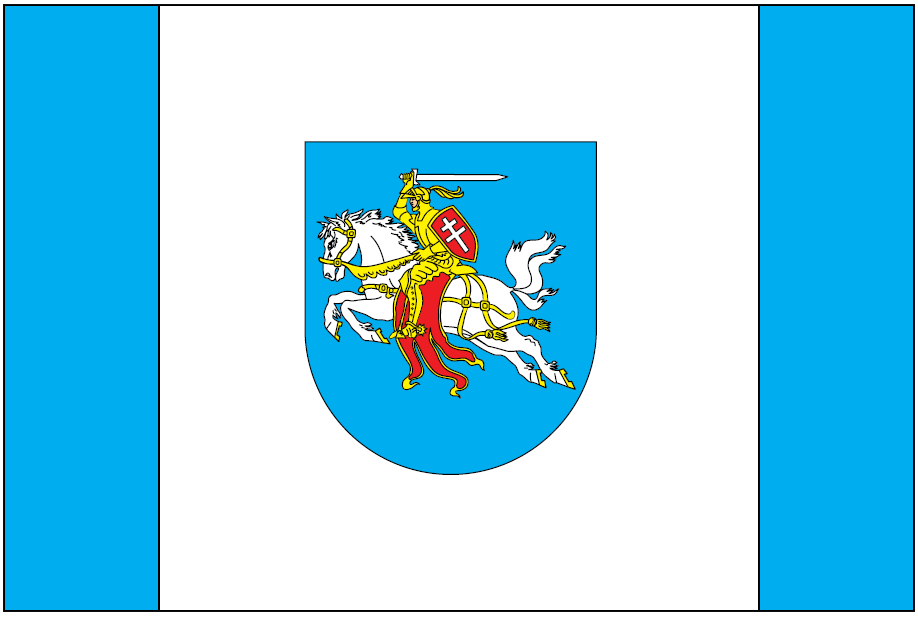
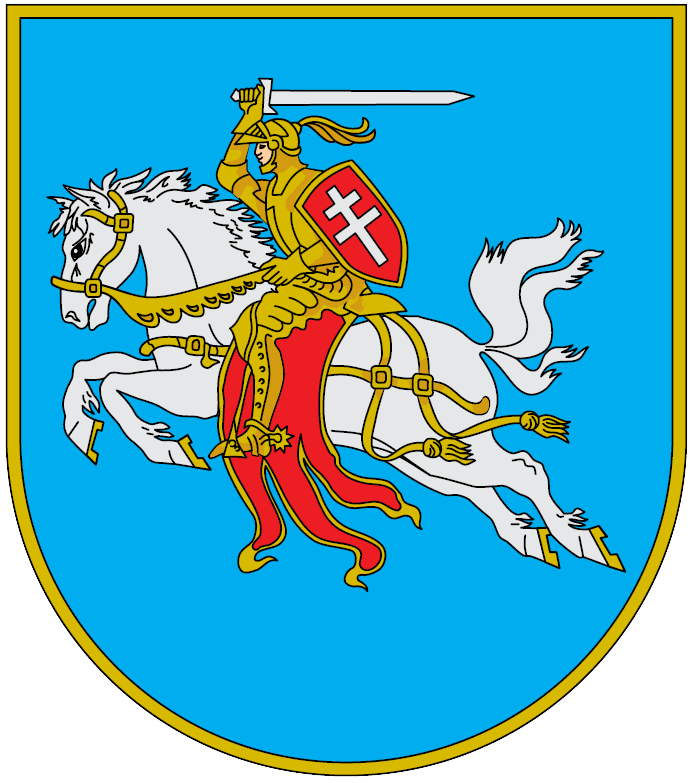
- Flag Coat of arms

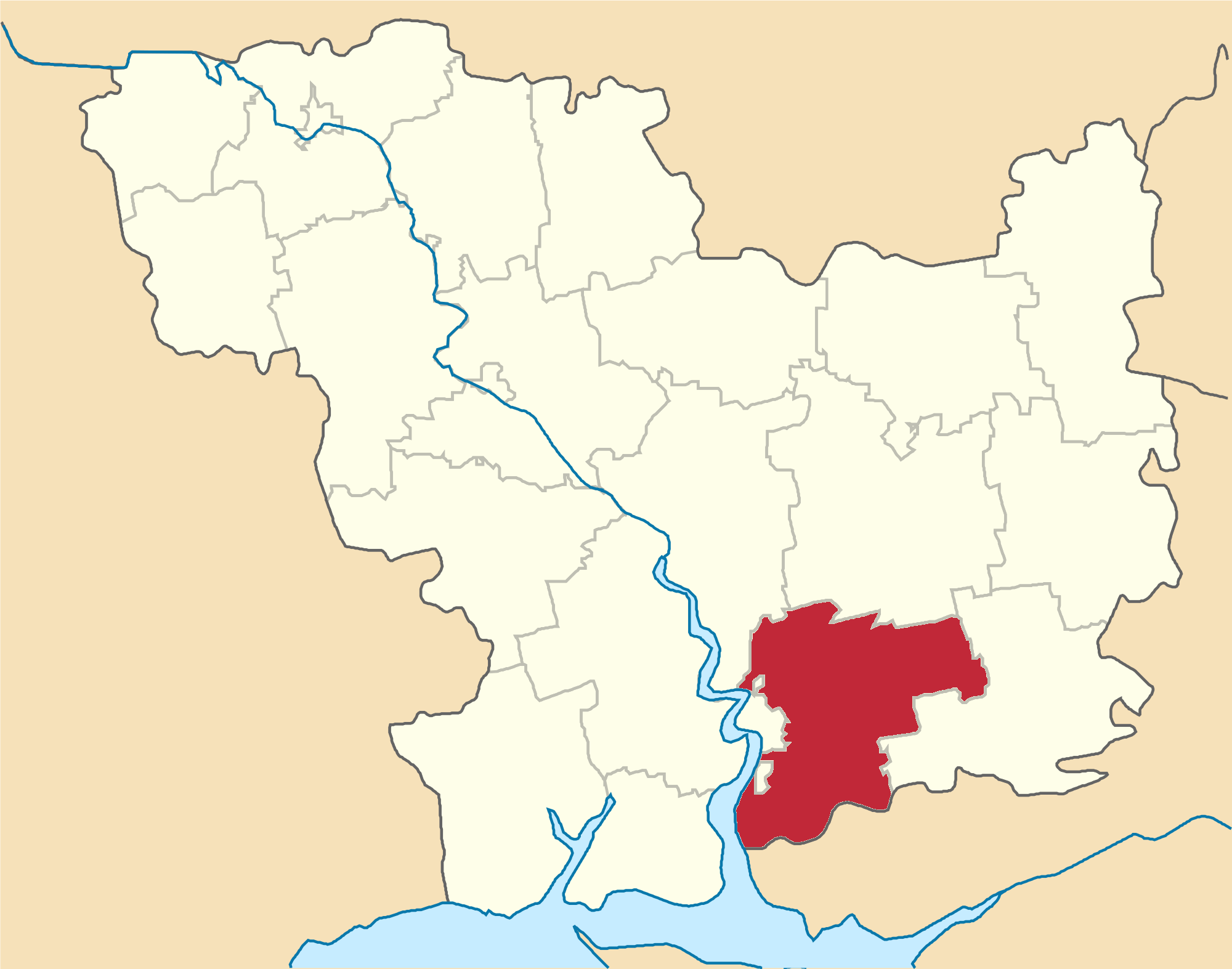
- Coordinates: 46°57′50″N 32°13′24″E
- Country: Ukraine
- Oblast: Mykolaiv Oblast
- Established: 1939
- Disestablished: 18 July 2020
- Admin. center: Mykolaiv
- Subdivisions: List: 0 — city councils; 2 — settlement councils; 19 — rural councils; Number of localities: 0 — cities; 2 — urban-type settlements; 30 — villages; 12 — rural settlements

Government
  - Governor: Oleksandr Stohrskiy

Area
  - Total: 1,460 km^{2} (560 sq mi)

Population (2020)
  - Total: 49,432 ▼
  - Density: 33.9/km^{2} (87.7/sq mi)
- Time zone: UTC+02:00 (EET)
  - Summer (DST): UTC+03:00 (EEST)
- Postal index: 57200—57287
- Area code: +380 512

Vitovka Raion (Ukrainian: Вітовський район) was a subdivision of Mykolaiv Oblast of Ukraine. Its administrative center was the city of Mykolaiv, which was incorporated separately as a city of oblast significance and did not belong to the raion. The raion was abolished on 18 July 2020 as part of the administrative reform of Ukraine, which reduced the number of raions of Mykolaiv Oblast to four. The area of Vitovka Raion was merged into Mykolaiv Raion. The last estimate of the raion population was 49,432 (2020 est.)

== History ==
In 1939, Mykolaiv Rural Raion (sometimes referred to as Mykolaiv Raion) in Mykolaiv Oblast was established with the center in the city of Mykolaiv. On 12 September 1944, Mykolaiv Rural Raion was renamed Zhovtneve Raion, and the administrative center of the raion was transferred from Mykolaiv to the city of Zhovtneve (named after October Revolution; previously known as Bohoyavlenskyi and Vitovka). On 27 December 1973, Zhovtneve was merged into the city of Mykolaiv, and therefore Mykolaiv became the administrative center of the raion. Mykolaiv Raion, which existed between 1923 and 1930, and since 1963, though has its administrative center in the city of Mykolaiv as well, was located in a different area. On 19 May 2016, Zhovtneve Raion was renamed to Vitovka Raion conform to the law prohibiting names of Communist origin.

At the time of disestablishment, the raion consisted of five hromadas,

- Halytsynove rural hromada with the administration in the selo of Halytsynove;
- Mishkovo-Pohorilove rural hromada with the administration in the selo of Mishkovo-Pohorilove;
- Pervomaiske settlement hromada with the administration in the urban-type settlement of Pervomaiske;
- Shevchenkove rural hromada with the administration in the selo of Shevchenkove;
- Voskresenske settlement hromada with the administration in the urban-type settlement of Voskresenske.
