= Administrative divisions of Mykolaiv Oblast =

Mykolaiv Oblast is subdivided into districts (raions) which are subdivided into territorial communities (hromadas).

== Current ==
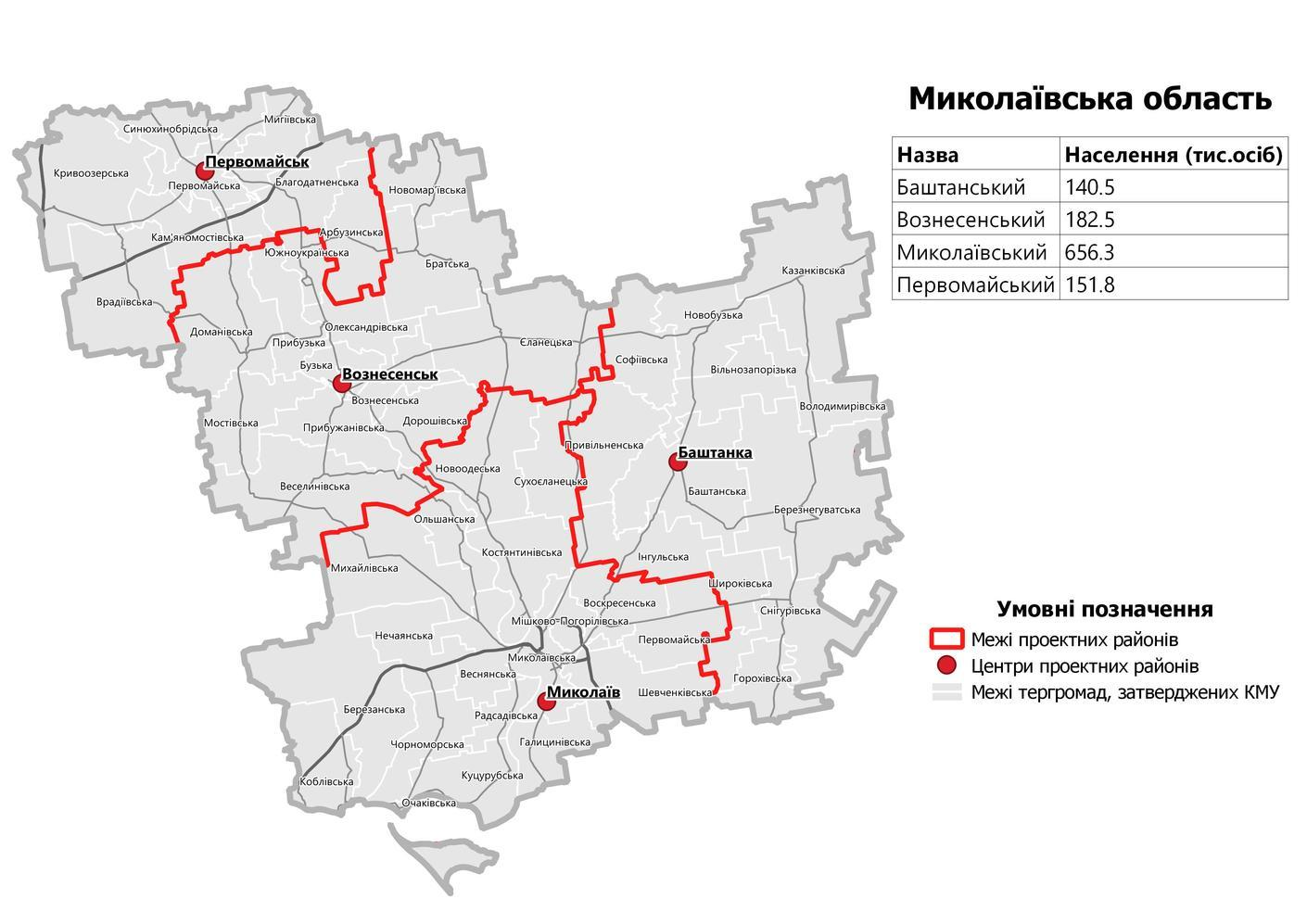
Raions of Mykolaiv Oblast as of August 2020.

On 18 July 2020, the number of districts was reduced to four. These are:

1. Bashtanka (Баштанський район), the center is in the city of Bashtanka;
2. Mykolaiv (Миколаївський район), the center is in the city of Mykolaiv;
3. Pervomaisk (Первомайський район), the center is in the city of Pervomaisk;
4. Voznesensk (Вознесенський район), the center is in the city of Voznesensk.

**Mykolaiv Oblast**
As of January 1, 2022
Number of districts (райони)	4
Number of hromadas (громади)	52

=== Communities (hromadas) per District (raion) ===
In bold are communities (hromadas) with cities

Bashtanka Raion

- **Bashtanka**
- Bereznehuvate
- Horokhivske
- Inhulka
- Kazanka
- **Novyi Buh**
- Pryvilne
- Shyroke
- **Snihurivka**
- Sofiivka
- Vilne Zaporizhia
- Volodymyrivka

Mykolaiv Raion

- Berezanka
- Chornomorka
- Halytsynove
- Kobleve
- Kostiantynivka
- Kutsurub
- Mishkovo-Pohorilove
- **Mykolaiv**
- Nechayane
- **Nova Odesa**
- **Ochakiv**
- Olshanske
- Radisnyi Sad
- Shevchenkove
- Stepove
- Sukhyi Yelanets
- Vesniane
- Voskresenske
- Zavodske

Pervomaisk Raion

- Arbuzynka
- Blahodatne
- Vradiivka
- Kamyanyi Mist
- Kryve Ozero
- Myhiya
- **Pervomaisk**
- Syniushyn Brid

Voznesensk Raion

- Bratske
- Buzke
- Domanivka
- Doroshivka
- Mostove
- Novomaryivka
- Oleksandrivka
- **Pivdennoukrayinsk**
- Prybuzhany
- Prybuzhia
- Veselynove
- **Voznesensk**
- Yelanets

== Administrative divisions until 2020 ==
Raions of Mykolaiv Oblast as of June 2020. The city of Mykolaiv is shown in dark blue.

Before July 2020, Mykolaiv Oblast was subdivided into 24 regions: 19 districts (raions) and 5 city municipalities (mis'krada or misto), officially known as territories governed by city councils.

- Cities under the oblast's jurisdiction:
  - Mykolaiv (Миколаїв), the administrative center of the oblast
  - Ochakiv (Очаків)
  - Pervomaisk (Первомайськ)
  - Voznesensk (Вознесенськ)
  - Yuzhnoukrainsk (Южноукраїнськ)
- Districts (raions):
  - Arbuzynka (Арбузинський район)
    - Urban-type settlements under the district's jurisdiction:
      - Arbuzynka (Арбузинка)
      - Kostiantynivka (Костянтинівка)
  - Bashtanka (Баштанський район)
    - Cities and towns under the district's jurisdiction:
      - Bashtanka (Баштанка)
  - Berezanka (Березанський район)
    - Urban-type settlements under the district's jurisdiction:
      - Berezanka (Березанка)
  - Bereznehuvate (Березнегуватський район)
    - Urban-type settlements under the district's jurisdiction:
      - Bereznehuvate (Березнегувате)
  - Bratske (Братський район)
    - Urban-type settlements under the district's jurisdiction:
      - Bratske (Братське)
  - Domanivka (Доманівський район)
    - Urban-type settlements under the district's jurisdiction:
      - Domanivka (Доманівка)
  - Kazanka (Казанківський район)
    - Urban-type settlements under the district's jurisdiction:
      - Kazanka (Казанка)
  - Kryve Ozero (Кривоозерський район)
    - Urban-type settlements under the district's jurisdiction:
      - Kryve Ozero (Криве Озеро)
  - Mykolaiv (Миколаївський район)
    - Urban-type settlements under the district's jurisdiction:
      - Olshanske (Ольшанське)
  - Nova Odesa (Новоодеський район)
    - Cities and towns under the district's jurisdiction:
      - Nova Odesa (Нова Одеса)
  - Novyi Buh (Новобузький район)
    - Cities and towns under the district's jurisdiction:
      - Novyi Buh (Новий Буг)
  - Ochakiv (Очаківський район)
  - Pervomaisk (Первомайський район)
    - Urban-type settlements under the district's jurisdiction:
      - Pidhorodna (Підгородна)
  - Snihurivka (Снігурівський район)
    - Cities and towns under the district's jurisdiction:
      - Snihurivka (Снігурівка)
  - Veselynove (Веселинівський район)
    - Urban-type settlements under the district's jurisdiction:
      - Tokarivka (Токарівка), formerly Kudriavtsivka
      - Veselynove (Веселинове)
  - Vitovka (Вітовський район), formerly Zhovtneve Raion
    - Urban-type settlements under the district's jurisdiction:
      - Pervomaiske (Первомайське)
      - Voskresenske (Воскресенське)
  - Voznesensk (Вознесенський район)
    - Urban-type settlements under the district's jurisdiction:
      - Oleksandrivka (Олександрівка)
  - Vradiivka (Врадіївський район)
    - Urban-type settlements under the district's jurisdiction:
      - Vradiivka (Врадіївка)
  - Yelanets (Єланецький район)
    - Urban-type settlements under the district's jurisdiction:
      - Yelanets (Єланець)
