= List of cities in Mykolaiv Oblast =

Location of cities in Mykolaiv Oblast

There are nine populated places in Mykolaiv Oblast, Ukraine, that have been officially granted city status (Ukrainian: місто, romanized: misto) by the Verkhovna Rada, the country's parliament. Settlements with more than 10,000 people are eligible for city status, although the status is typically also granted to settlements of historical or regional importance. As of 5 December 2001, the date of the first and only official census in the country since independence, (Note: As of 11 July 2023) the most populous city in the oblast was the regional capital, Mykolaiv, with a population of 514,136 people, while the least populous city was Bashtanka, with 13,146 people. In 2024, following the passage of derussification laws, Yuzhnoukrainsk was renamed Pivdennoukrainsk. For their contributions to the country's defense during the Russian invasion, three cities in the oblast were awarded with the honorary title Hero City of Ukraine: Mykolaiv in 2022, and Bashtanka and Voznesensk in 2025.

From independence in 1991 to 2020, five cities in the oblast were designated as cities of regional significance (municipalities), which had self-government under city councils, while the oblast's remaining four cities were located in nineteen raions (districts) as cities of district significance, which are subordinated to the governments of the raions. On 18 July 2020, an administrative reform abolished and merged the oblast's raions and cities of regional significance into four new, expanded raions. The four raions that make up the oblast are Bashtanka, Mykolaiv, Pervomaisk, and Voznesensk.

== List of cities ==
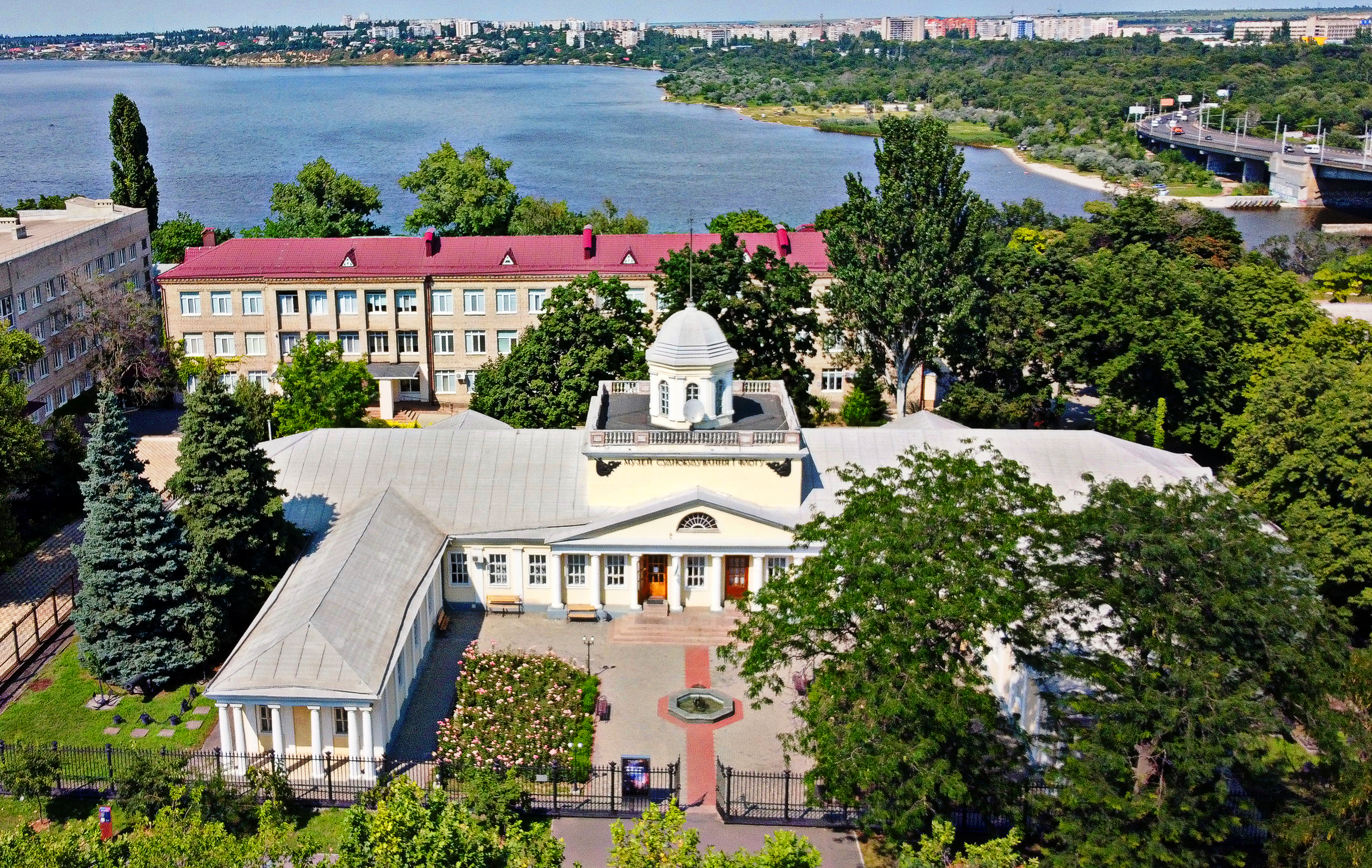
Mykolaiv, capital and most populous city in Mykolaiv Oblast

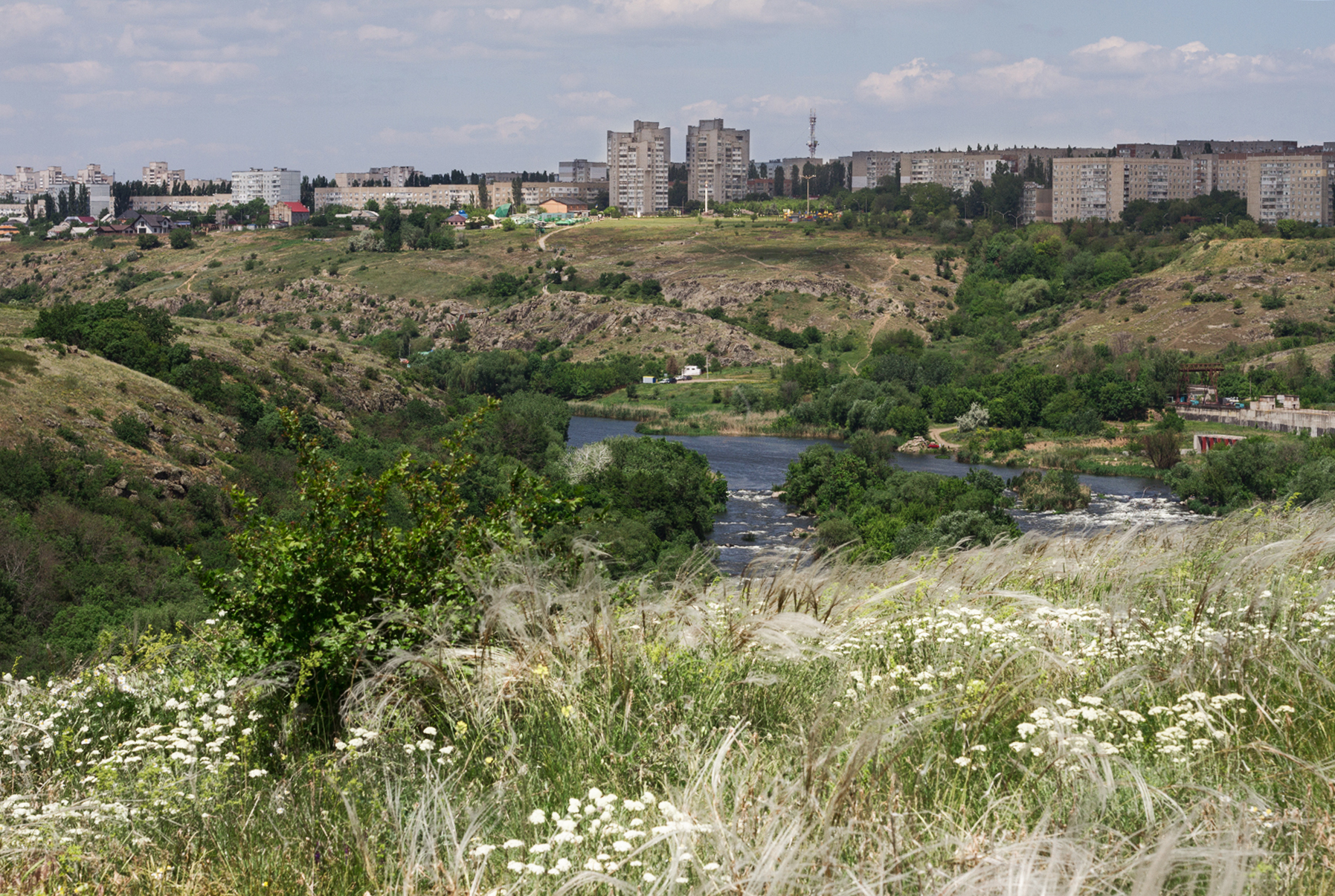
Pivdennoukrainsk, fourth most populous city in the oblast and the location of South Ukraine Nuclear Power Plant

Cities in Mykolaiv Oblast
Name	Name (in Ukrainian) (Note: Links to the Ukrainian Wikipedia articles for each city)	Raion (district)	Population (2022 estimates)	Population (2001 census)	Population change
Bashtanka	Баштанка	Bashtanka	12,180	13,146	−7.35%
Mykolaiv	Миколаїв	Mykolaiv	470,011	514,136	−8.58%
Nova Odesa	Нова Одеса	Mykolaiv	11,510	14,070	−18.19%
Novyi Buh	Новий Буг	Bashtanka	14,782	16,250	−9.03%
Ochakiv	Очаків	Mykolaiv	13,663	16,929	−19.29%
Pervomaisk	Первомайськ	Pervomaisk	62,426	70,170	−11.04%
Pivdennoukrainsk	Південноукраїнськ	Voznesensk	38,560	38,206	+0.93%
Snihurivka	Снігурівка	Bashtanka	12,045	15,447	−22.02%
Voznesensk	Вознесенськ	Voznesensk	33,442	42,634	−21.56%

== See also ==
- List of cities in Ukraine
