= Romanivka, Bereznehuvate settlement hromada, Bashtanka Raion, Mykolaiv Oblast =

Village in Mykolaiv Oblast, Ukraine

Romanivka Романівка (Ukrainian) Романовка (Russian)
- Village
- Map of Ukraine with Romanivka highlighted
- Coordinates: 47°26′07″N 32°56′41″E
- Country: Ukraine
- Oblast: Mykolaiv Oblast
- Raion: Bashtanka Raion
- Administrative Classification: KOATUU: 4821186060
- Founded: 1841

Area
  - Total: 0.462 km^{2} (0.178 sq mi)
- Elevation: 41 m (135 ft)

Population (2001)
  - Total: 188
  - Density: 406.93/km^{2} (1,053.9/sq mi)
- Time zone: UTC+2 (EET)
  - Summer (DST): UTC+3 (EEST)
- Postal code: 56221
- Area code: +380 5168

Romanivka (Ukrainian: Рома́нівка Russian: Романовка) is a village in Ukraine. It is part of Bashtanka Raion of Mykolaiv Oblast. It belongs to Bereznehuvate settlement hromada, one of the hromadas of Ukraine.

Until 18 July 2020, Romanivka belonged to Bereznehuvate Raion. The raion was abolished that day as part of the administrative reform of Ukraine, which reduced the number of raions of Mykolaiv Oblast to four. The area of Bereznehuvate Raion was merged into Bashtanka Raion.

== History ==
Romanivka was formed after a merger of Big Romanivka and Little Romanivka. It is and always was a predominantly Jewish settlement. Around 1886, many Jews of Kherson moved here. At that time, Romanivka had a population of 1476. The town was made up of 83 households and four synagogues and Jewish schools.

== Notable residents ==
- Stanisław Zaremba (1863–1942), Polish mathematician and engineer
