= Mykola Shytyuk =

Ukrainian academician and historian

Mykola Shytyuk (Ukrainian: Микола Миколайович Шитюк; 30 November 1953 – 1 September 2018) was a Ukrainian academician, historian, doctor of historical sciences. Since 2008, he was a director of the Institute of history and law of the Mykolaiv University.

Shytnyuk was born on 30 November 1953 in the village Lysa Hora, Lysa Hora Raion (today Pervomaisk Raion) in a family of construction engineer and teacher of geography. After graduating a rural school in Lysa Hora, Shytyuk enrolled in pedagogic uchilishche (junior college) in Novyi Buh, where he graduated in 1972 with a diploma of teacher of early grades. After that throughout most of the 1970s he worked in several schools of Mykolaiv Oblast with a small break when he served his military obligation in Belorussian Military District.

After being demobilized, in 1975 Shytyuk also enrolled in the history faculty of the Kyiv University.

On 1 September 2018 the scientist and researcher of Holodomor was found dead in an apartment in Mykolaiv with a knife in his back.
