= Liubomyrivka =

Liubomyrivka (Ukrainian: Любомирівка), also spelled Lyubomyrivka, may refer to the following places in Ukraine:

- Liubomyrivka, Dnipropetrovsk Oblast
- Liubomyrivka, Khmelnytskyi Oblast
- Liubomyrivka, Kyiv Oblast
- Liubomyrivka, Bereznehuvate settlement hromada, Bashtanka Raion, Mykolaiv Oblast
- Liubomyrivka, Kazanka settlement hromada, Bashtanka Raion, Mykolaiv Oblast
- Liubomyrivka, Mykolaiv Raion, Mykolaiv Oblast
- Liubomyrivka, Zaporizhzhia Oblast
