= Lysa Hora, Mykolaiv Oblast =

Village in Mykolaiv Oblast, Ukraine

Lysa Hora (Ukrainian: Лиса Гора, Russian: Лысая Гора) is a village in Pervomaisk Raion of Mykolaiv Oblast, Ukraine, located at 48°10′32″N 31°5′33″E. It belongs to Myhiia rural hromada, one of the hromadas of Ukraine.

Lysa Hora has a population of 4502 people. Body of local self-government - Lysa Hora village Rada. The village was founded in 1751 year. In those times the watch winterer of the Zaporizhzhya cossacks appeared Lysa Hora, that was the well fixed outpost.

== People ==
- Viktor Dobrovolsky
- Mykola Shytyuk
