= Stepan Dybets =

Ukrainian anarchist communist (1887–1937)

Stepan Semenovich Dybets (1887 – 26 November 1937) was a Ukrainian anarchist communist.

== Biography ==
Dybets was born in 1887, in Novyi Buh. He immigrated to the United States, where he was employed as a factory worker. In 1911, he joined the Industrial Workers of the World. He was a founding member of Golos Truda. He returned to Europe—his homelands now the Soviet Union—in 1917, and was employed to anarchist organizations of Kronstadt and Kolpino. He later worked as a bookkeeper in Berdiansk.

At some point, he realigned himself with the Bolsheviks, then claimed he experienced mental illness and did not speak for a month; he claimed he did so in fall 1918, but a writer also stated he was an anarchist during 1919. In 1919, he led the Revolutionary Insurgent Army of Ukraine. When Bill Haywood moved to the Soviet Union in the 1920s, Dybets was appointed to service Haywood by Vladimir Lenin. Throughout the 1930s, he led several automotive groups, which at some point included GAZ, as well as visiting the United States to purchase $30,000,000 worth of automotive parts from the Ford River Rouge complex. He was accused of being an American spy and of Wrecking (sabotage) by the state, and was executed on 26 November 1937. From the 1950s until his death, author Alexander Bek attempted writing a novel based on Dybets, but died before completing it. The incomplete version was published in 1972, by Sovetsky Pisatel.
