= Yelanets =

Rural locality in Mykolaiv Oblast, Ukraine

Yelanets Єланець
- Rural settlement
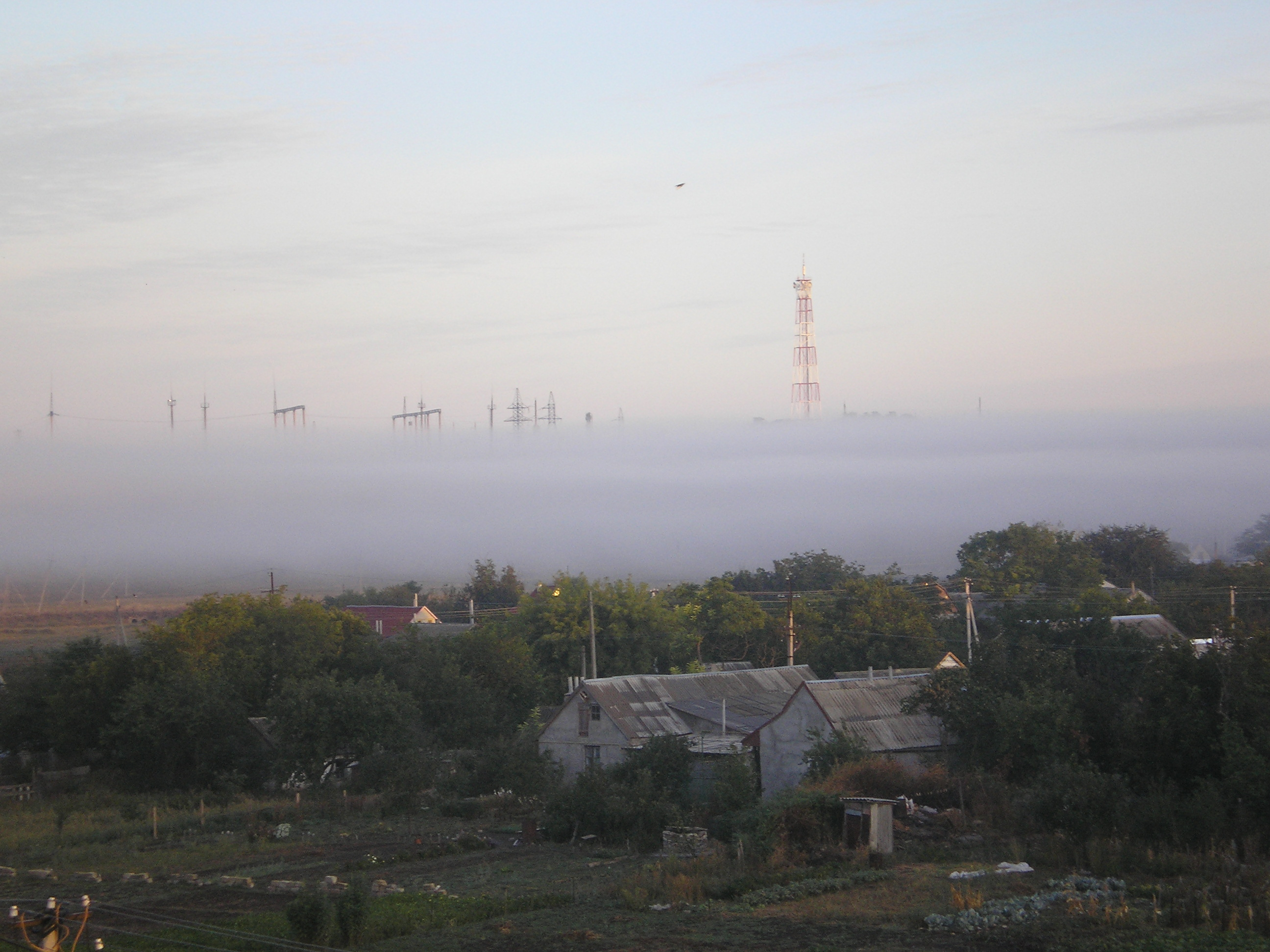
- Fog over Hnylyi Yelanets River

- Location within Mykolaiv Oblast
- Coordinates: 47°41′45″N 31°51′14″E
- Country: Ukraine
- Oblast: Mykolaiv Oblast
- Raion: Voznesensk Raion
- Hromada: Yelanets settlement hromada

Population (2022)
  - Total: 4,636
- Time zone: UTC+2 (EET)
  - Summer (DST): UTC+3 (EEST)

Yelanets (Ukrainian: Єланець; Russian: Еланец) is a rural settlement in Voznesensk Raion. Mykolaiv Oblast, Ukraine. It hosts the administration of Yelanets settlement hromada, one of the hromadas of Ukraine. Population: 4,636 (2022 estimate).

The settlement is located at the left bank of the Hnylyi Yelanets River, a right tributary of the Southern Bug.

== History ==
Yelanets was founded in the 1800s as Hnylyi Yelanets. In 1810, it was renamed Novomoskovsk, and in 1818 has become a military settlement which belonged to Yelisavetgrad uezd of Kherson Governorate. In 1828, Yelisavetgrad uezd was merged with Olviopol uezd into Bobrinets uezd. In 1857, military settlements were abolished. In 1858, Novomoskovsk was renamed Yelanets. In 1865, the administrative center of Bobrinetsky Uyezd was moved to Yelisavetgrad, and the uezd was renamed Yelisavetgrad. Yelanets was a selo and the center of Yelanets Volost of Yelisavetgrad uezd.

On 16 April 1920, Kherson Governorate was renamed Nikolayev Governorate, and on 21 October 1922, it was merged into Odesa Governorate. In 1923, uyezds were abolished, and Yelanets was included in the newly established Voznesensk Raion of Mykolaiv Okruha. In 1925, the governorates were abolished, and okruhas were directly subordinated to Ukrainian Soviet Socialist Republic. In 1926, Yelanets Raion of Mykolaiv Okruha, with the administrative center in Yelanets, was established. In 1930, okruhas were abolished. In 1935, Yelanets Raion was transferred to Odesa Oblast. On 22 September 1937, Mykolaiv Oblast was established on lands which previously belonged to Dnipropetrovsk and Odesa Oblasts, and Yelanets Raion has become a part of newly created Mykolaiv Oblast. In 1968, Yelanets was granted an urban-type settlement status.

On 18 July 2020, Yelanets Raion was abolished as part of the administrative reform of Ukraine, which reduced the number of raions of Mykolaiv Oblast to four. The area of Yelanets Raion was merged into Voznesensk Raion. On 26 January 2024, a new law entered into force which abolished the status of urban-type settlement status, and Yelanets became a rural settlement.

== Economy ==
=== Transportation ===
The closest railway station is in Voznesensk, 45 kilometres (28 mi) west of the settlement.
