= Yelanets Raion =

Former subdivision of Mykolaiv Oblast, Ukraine

Yelanets Raion Єланецький район
- Raion
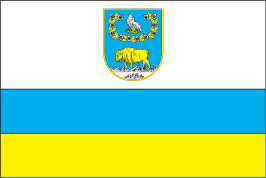
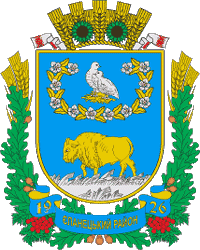
- Flag Coat of arms

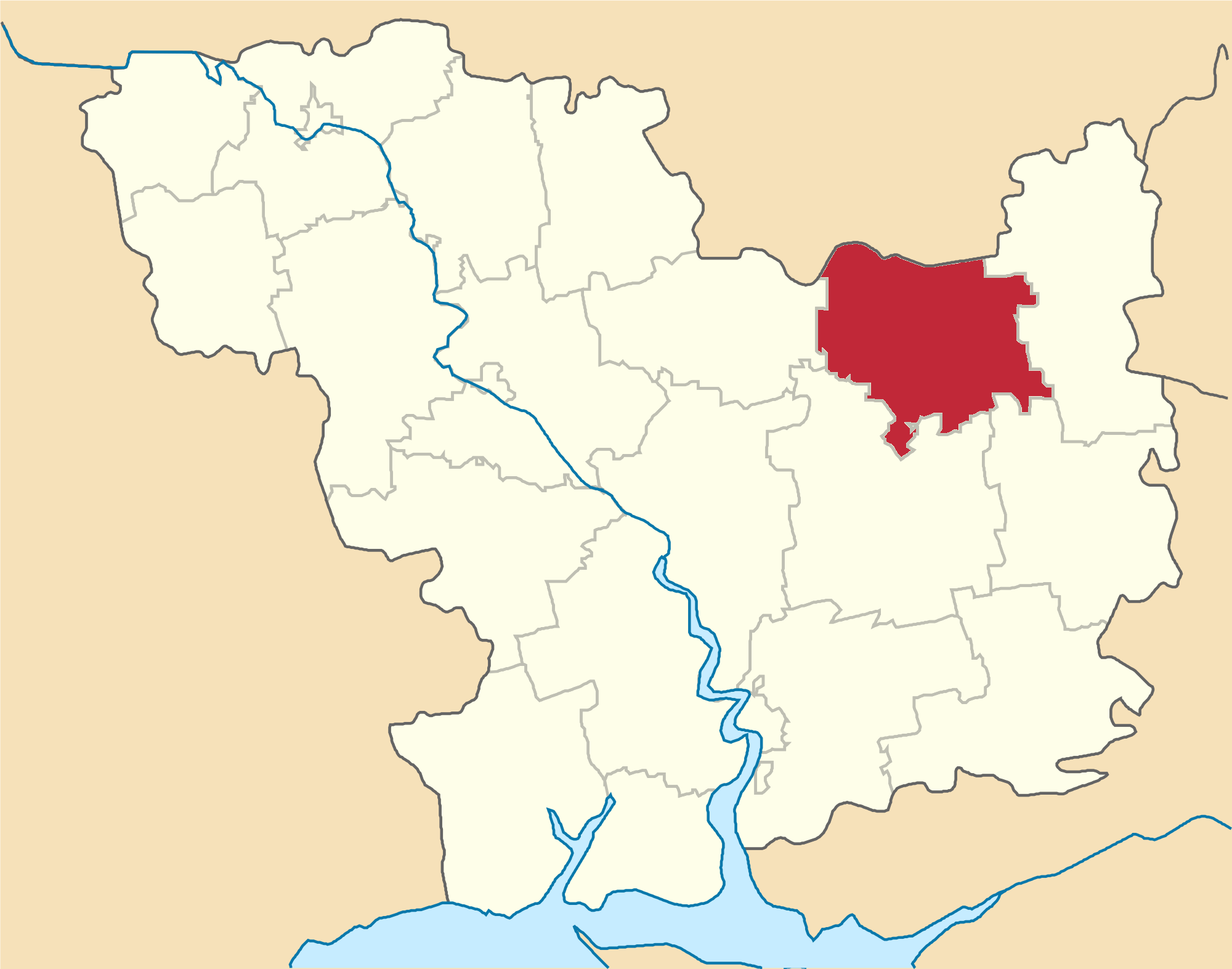
- Coordinates: 47°40′28″N 31°55′8″E
- Country: Ukraine
- Oblast: Mykolaiv Oblast
- Established: 1926
- Disestablished: 18 July 2020
- Admin. center: Yelanets
- Subdivisions: List: 0 — city councils; 1 — settlement councils; 11 — rural councils; Number of localities: 0 — cities; 1 — urban-type settlements; 36 — villages; 0 — rural settlements

Government
  - Governor: Andriy Dobrovolskiy

Area
  - Total: 1,017 km^{2} (393 sq mi)

Population (2020)
  - Total: 14,863 ▼
  - Density: 14.61/km^{2} (37.85/sq mi)
- Time zone: UTC+02:00 (EET)
  - Summer (DST): UTC+03:00 (EEST)
- Postal index: 55500—55560
- Area code: +380 5159

Yelanets Raion (Ukrainian: Єланецький район) was located in Mykolaiv Oblast of Ukraine. Its administrative center was the urban-type settlement of Yelanets. The raion was abolished on 18 July 2020 as part of the administrative reform of Ukraine, which reduced the number of raions of Mykolaiv Oblast to four. The area of Yelanets Raion was merged into Voznesensk Raion. The last estimate of the raion population was 14,863 (2020 est.)

== History ==
In 1926, Yelanets Raion of Mykolaiv Okruha, with the administrative center in Yelanets, was established. The okruhas were directly subordinated to Ukrainian Soviet Socialist Republic. In 1930, okruhas were abolished. In 1935, Yelanets Raion was transferred to Odessa Oblast. On 22 September 1937, Mykolaiv Oblast was established on lands which previously belonged to Dnipropetrovsk and Odessa Oblasts, and Yelanets Raion became part of newly created Mykolaiv Oblast. In 1968, Yelanets was granted urban-type settlement status.

At the time of disestablishment, the raion consisted of one hromada, Yelanets settlement hromada with the administration in Yelanets.
