= Nova Odesa Raion =

Former subdivision of Mykolaiv Oblast, Ukraine

Nova Odesa Raion Новоодеський район
- Raion
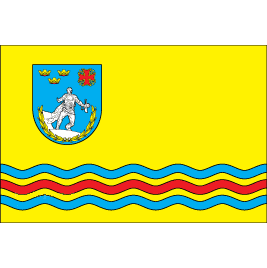
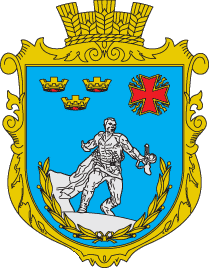
- Flag Coat of arms

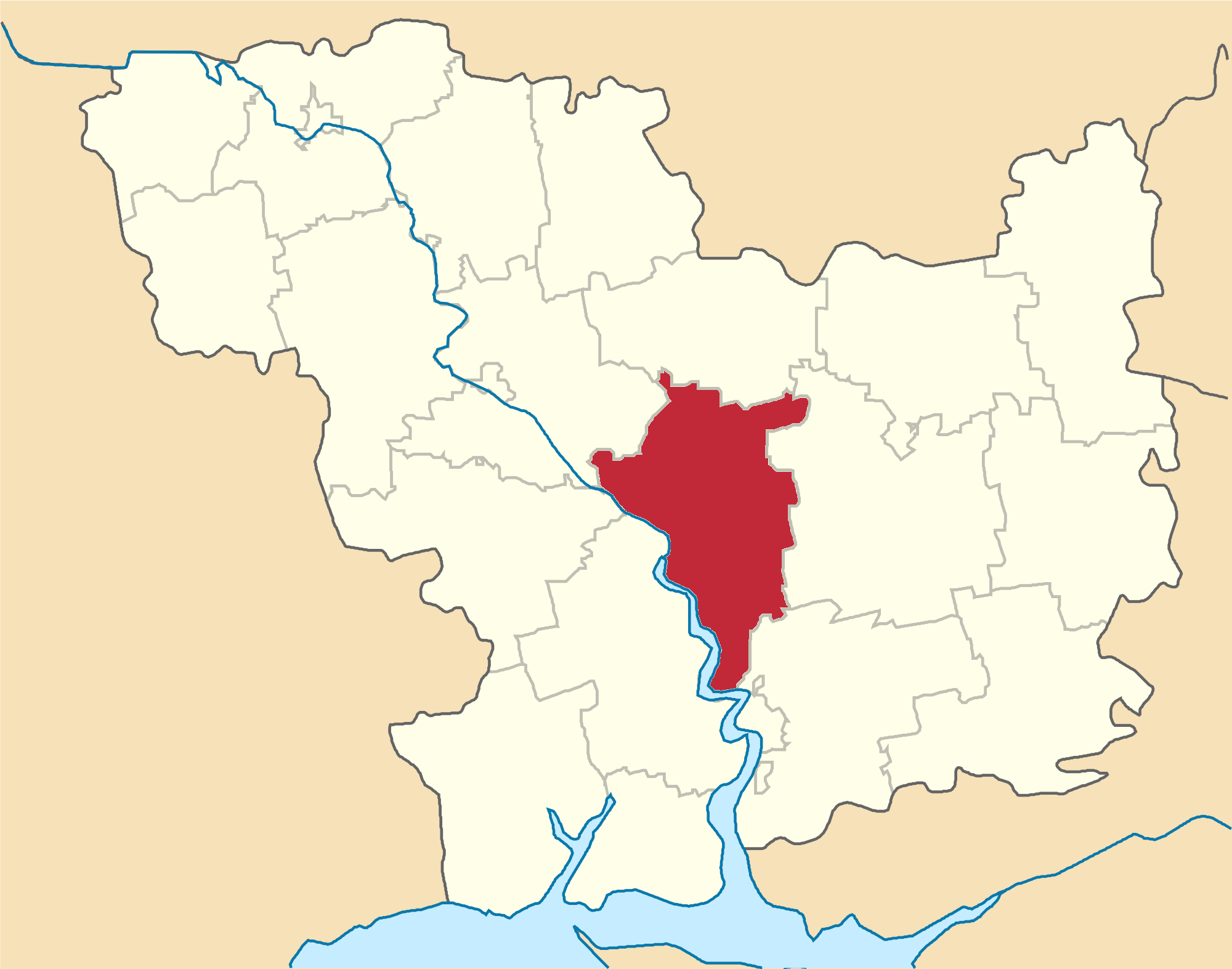
- Coordinates: 47°20′11″N 31°54′36″E
- Country: Ukraine
- Oblast: Mykolaiv Oblast
- Established: 1923
- Disestablished: 18 July 2020
- Admin. center: Nova Odesa
- Subdivisions: List: 1 — city councils; 0 — settlement councils; 17 — rural councils; Number of localities: 1 — cities; 0 — urban-type settlements; 40 — villages; 1 — rural settlements

Government
  - Governor: Ivan Vovchok

Area
  - Total: 1,428 km^{2} (551 sq mi)

Population (2020)
  - Total: 32,239 ▼
  - Density: 22.58/km^{2} (58.47/sq mi)
- Time zone: UTC+02:00 (EET)
  - Summer (DST): UTC+03:00 (EEST)
- Postal index: 56600—56664
- Area code: +380 5167

Nova Odesa Raion (Ukrainian: Новоодеський район) was a subdivision of Mykolaiv Oblast of Ukraine. Its administrative center was the town of Nova Odesa. The raion was abolished on 18 July 2020 as part of the administrative reform of Ukraine, which reduced the number of raions of Mykolaiv Oblast to four. The area of Nova Odesa Raion was merged into Mykolaiv Raion. The last estimate of the raion population was 32,239 (2020 est.)

At the time of disestablishment, the raion consisted of three hromadas,

- Kostiantynivka rural hromada with the administration in the selo of Kostiantynivka;
- Nova Odesa urban hromada with the administration in Nova Odesa;
- Sukhyi Yelanets rural hromada with the administration in the selo of Sukhyi Yelanets.
