= Bereznehuvate =

Rural locality in Mykolaiv Oblast, Ukraine

Bereznehuvate Березнегувате
- Rural settlement
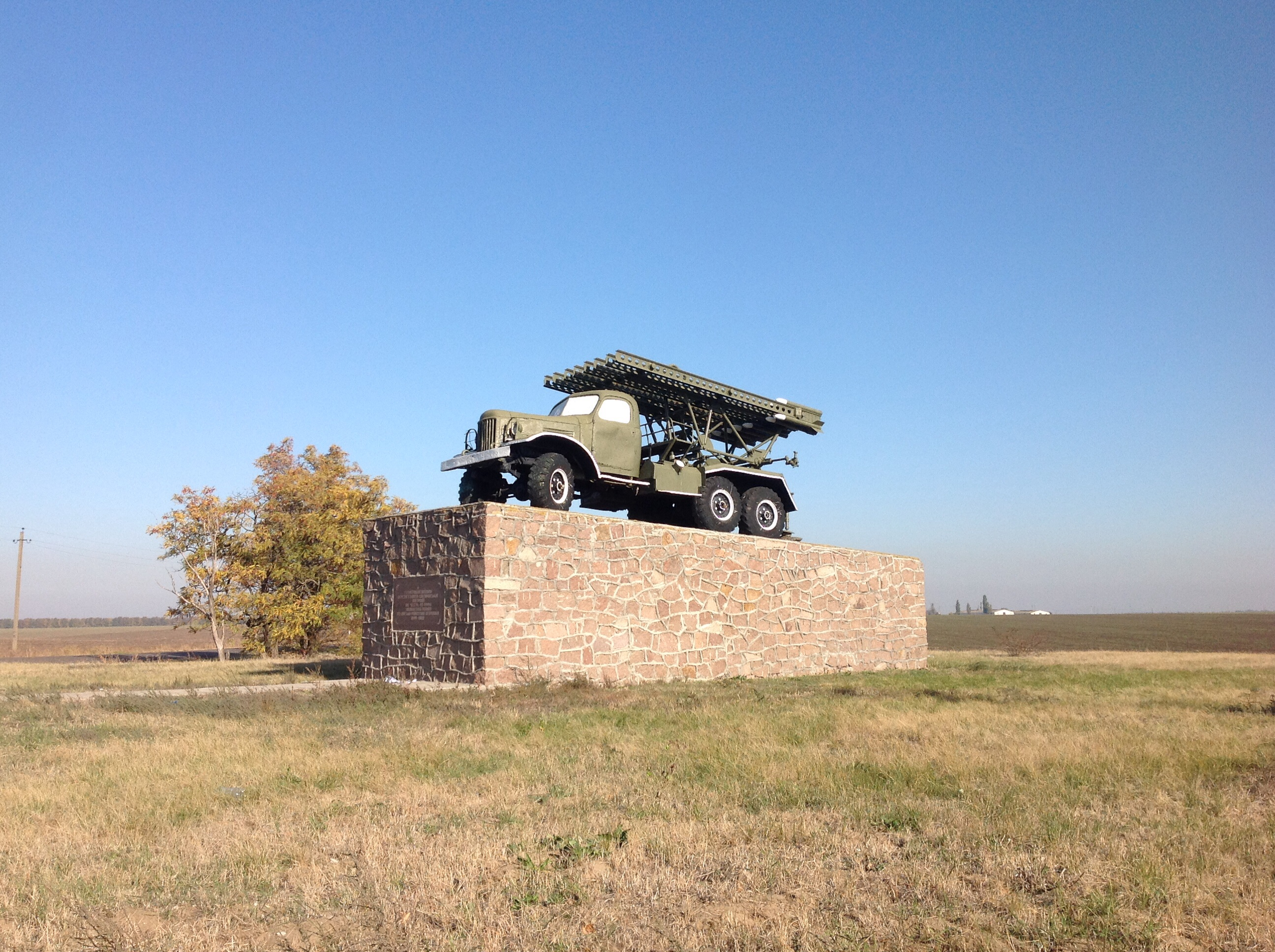

- Location of Bereznehuvate Bereznehuvate (Mykolaiv Oblast)
- Coordinates: 47°18′41″N 32°50′52″E
- Country: Ukraine
- Oblast: Mykolaiv Oblast
- Raion: Bashtanka Raion

Population (2022)
  - Total: 7,259
- Time zone: UTC+2 (EET)
  - Summer (DST): UTC+3 (EEST)

Bereznehuvate (Ukrainian: Березнегувате, Russian: Березнегова́тое) is a rural settlement in Bashtanka Raion in the east of Mykolaiv Oblast, Ukraine. It hosts the administration of Bereznehuvate settlement hromada, one of the hromadas of Ukraine. Population: 7,259 (2022 estimate).

== History ==
The settlement is located on the right bank of the Vysun, a right tributary of the Inhulets, in the basin of the Dnieper.

Bereznehuvate was founded in the 1780s by Zaporozhian Cossacks. It is first mentioned in 1787 and was used as a place to banish and resettle people from central Ukrainian lands. In 1820, Bereznehuvate became a military settlement subordinate to the Black Sea Navy. Administratively, it belonged to Khersonsky Uyezd, which belonged to different governorates of the Russian Empire: Yekaterinoslav Viceroyalty until 1795, Voznesensk Viceroyalty until 1796, Novorossiya Governorate until 1803, Kherson Governorate until 1920, Nikolayev Governorate until 1921, and Odessa Governorate until 1923, when uyezds were abolished in the Ukrainian Soviet Socialist Republic, and governorates were divided into okruhas. In 1923, Bereznehuvate Raion of Kherson Okruha, with the administrative center in Bereznehuvate, was established. In 1925, the governorates were abolished, and okruhas were directly subordinated to Ukrainian SSR. In 1930, okruhas were abolished. In 1935, Bereznehuvate Raion was transferred into Odessa Oblast. On 22 September 1937, Mykolaiv Oblast was established on lands which previously belonged to Dnipropetrovsk and Odessa Oblasts, and Bereznehuvate Raion became part of newly created Mykolaiv Oblast.

In March and April 1944, Bereznegovatoye–Snigirevka Offensive, a part of major Dnieper–Carpathian Offensive of the Soviet army during the last phase of World War II, took place around Bereznehuvate. In 1956, Bereznehuvate was granted urban-type settlement status.

On 18 July 2020, Bereznehuvate Raion was abolished as part of the administrative reform of Ukraine, which reduced the number of raions of Mykolaiv Oblast to four. The area of Bereznehuvate Raion was merged into Bashtanka Raion. On 26 January 2024, a new law entered into force which abolished the status of urban-type settlement status, and Bereznehuvate became a rural settlement.

== Economy ==
=== Transportation ===
Bereznehuvata railway station, on the railway connecting Snihurivka and Apostolove, is approximately 12 kilometres (7.5 mi) southeast of Bereznehuvate.
