= Bereznehuvate settlement hromada =

Bereznehuvate hromada Березнегуватська селищна громада
- Hromada
- Bereznehuvate settlement hromada
- Interactive map of Bereznehuvate hromada
- Country: Ukraine
- Oblast (region): Mykolaiv Oblast
- Raion (district): Bashtanka Raion
- Founded: 10 August 2018 (amalgamated hromada); 17 July 2020 (hromada)

Population (2022)
  - Total: 18,734

Bereznehuvate settlement hromada (Ukrainian: Березнегуватська селищна громада) is a hromada (territorial community) in Ukraine, in Bashtanka Raion of Mykolaiv Oblast. The administrative center is the urban-type settlement of Bereznehuvate. Population: 18,734 (2022 estimate).

From its inception until 18 July 2020, Bereznehuvate settlement hromada was located in the Bereznehuvate Raion. The raion was abolished in July 2020 as part of the administrative reform of Ukraine, which reduced the number of raions of Mykolaiv Oblast to four.
