= Novyi Buh Raion =

Former subdivision of Mykolaiv Oblast, Ukraine

Novyi Buh Raion Новобузький район
- Raion
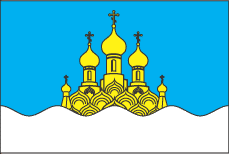
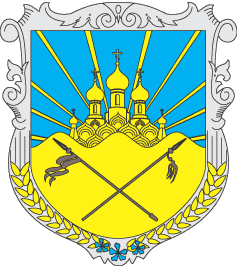
- Flag Coat of arms

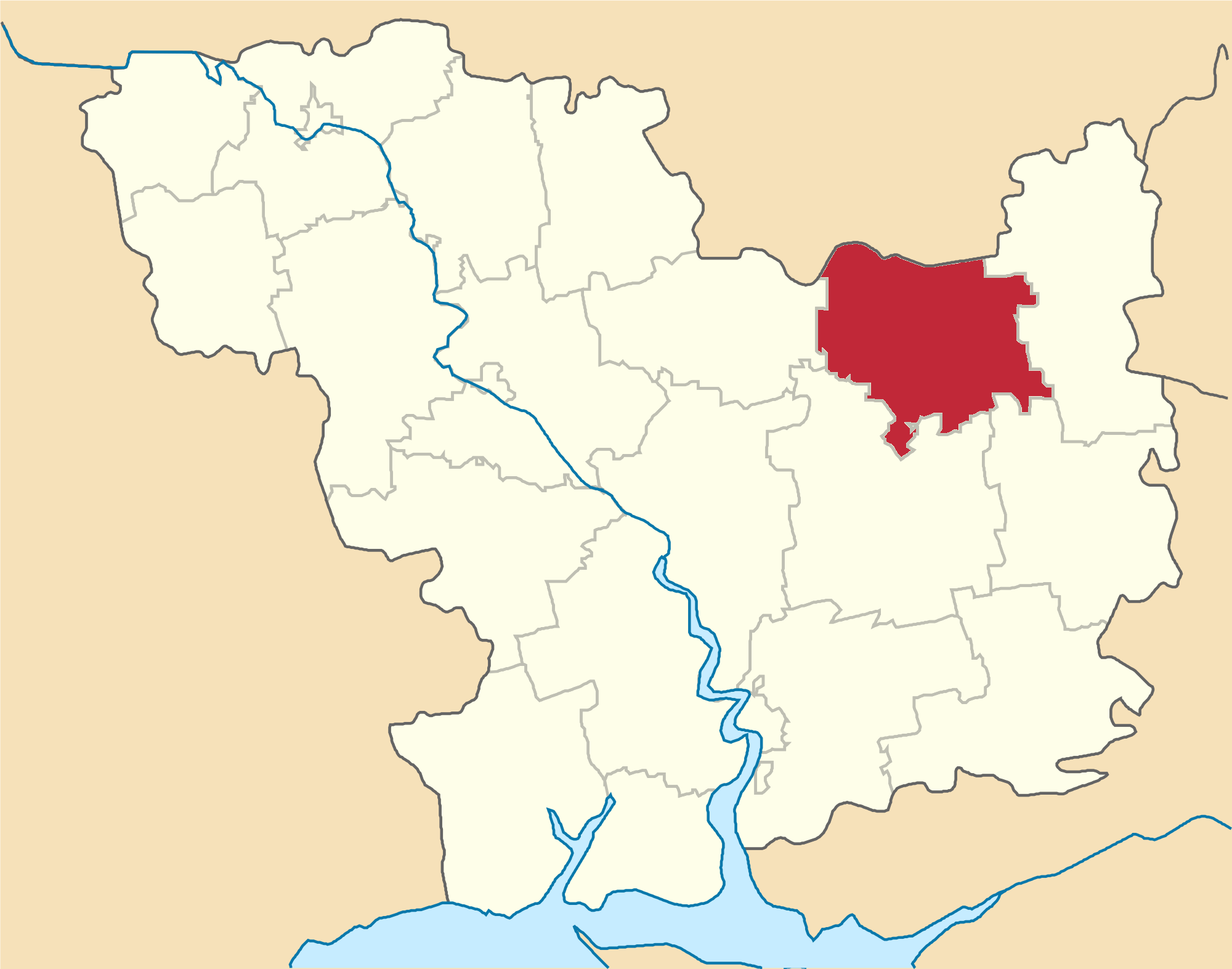
- Coordinates: 47°39′25″N 32°28′55″E
- Country: Ukraine
- Oblast: Mykolaiv Oblast
- Established: 1922
- Disestablished: 18 July 2020
- Admin. center: Novyi Buh
- Subdivisions: List: 1 — city councils; 0 — settlement councils; 12 — rural councils; Number of localities: 1 — cities; 0 — urban-type settlements; 55 — villages; 2 — rural settlements

Government
  - Governor: Viktor Serbin

Area
  - Total: 1,243 km^{2} (480 sq mi)

Population (2020)
  - Total: 29,851 ▼
  - Density: 24.02/km^{2} (62.20/sq mi)
- Time zone: UTC+02:00 (EET)
  - Summer (DST): UTC+03:00 (EEST)
- Postal index: 55600—55654
- Area code: +380 5151

Novyi Buh Raion (Ukrainian: Новобузький район) was a subdivision of Mykolaiv Oblast of Ukraine. Its administrative center was the town of Novyi Buh. The raion was abolished on 18 July 2020 as part of the administrative reform of Ukraine, which reduced the number of raions of Mykolaiv Oblast to four. The area of Novyi Buh Raion was merged into Bashtanka Raion. The last estimate of the raion population was 29,851 (2020 est.)

At the time of disestablishment, the raion consisted of three hromadas,

- Novyi Buh urban hromada with the administration in Novyi Buh;
- Sofiivka rural hromada with the administration in the selo of Sofiivka;
- Vilne Zaporizhzhia rural hromada with the administration in the selo of Vilne Zaporizhzhia.
