= Bashtanka =

City in Mykolaiv Oblast, Ukraine

Bashtanka Баштанка
- City
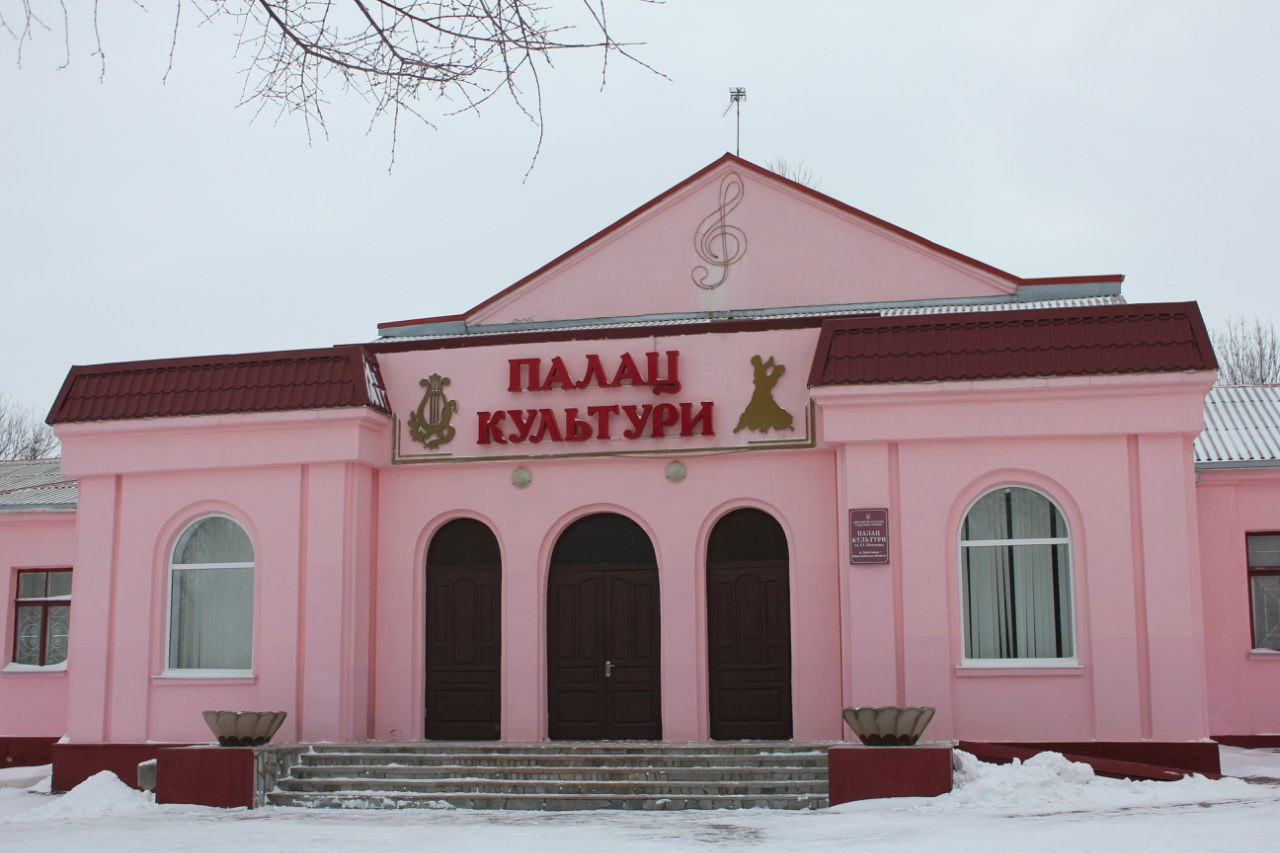
- House of Culture in Bashtanka

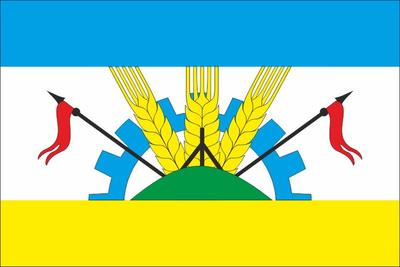
- Flag
- Interactive map of Bashtanka
- Location of Bashtanka Bashtanka (Mykolaiv Oblast)
- Coordinates: 47°24′20″N 32°26′15″E
- Country: Ukraine
- Oblast: Mykolaiv Oblast
- Raion: Bashtanka Raion
- Hromada: Bashtanka urban hromada
- Founded: 1806
- City rights: 1987

Government
  - Mayor: Volodymyr Rybachenko

Area
  - Total: 7.14 km^{2} (2.76 sq mi)

Population (2022)
  - Total: 12,180
  - Density: 1,710/km^{2} (4,420/sq mi)
- Postal code: 56100-56109
- Area code: +380-5158

Bashtanka (Ukrainian: Баштанка, pronounced [bɐʃˈtɑnkɐ]) is a city in Mykolaiv Oblast, Ukraine. It is the administrative center of Bashtanka Raion. Bashtanka hosts the administration of Bashtanka urban hromada, one of the hromadas of Ukraine. Population: 12,180 (2022 estimate). In 2001, population was 13,146.

== History ==
Originally known as Poltavka, Bashtanka was granted urban-type settlement status in 1963.

During the 2022 Russian invasion of Ukraine, on 1 March, 600 Russian soldiers in a column of about 250-300 military vehicles with the letter Z launched an offensive on Bashtanka after passing through Yavkyne. The Ukrainian Territorial Defense and local residents fired on the convoy, which retreated in disarray after entering the center of the city. Over the next few days, 28 Russian soldiers were found in and around Bashtanka hiding in basements and nearby villages.

Bashtanka was shelled with Grad missiles after the Russian retreat. One of the most serious bombardments, which involved cluster munitions, took place on the morning of 13 March 2022. As of April 2022, 176 houses in the Bashtanka urban hromada had been destroyed, and only about 30% of the pre-war population remained in the city. On 20 April, a hospital was reportedly hit by a Russian missile. In honour of the city's defense during the initial Russian invasion of Ukraine, the President of Ukraine, Volodymyr Zelenskyy, awarded Bashtanka the title of "Hero City of Ukraine" on 30 September 2025.

== Demographics ==
As of the 2001 Ukrainian census, Bashtanka had a population of 13,072, which decreased to 12,180 in early 2022. The population is ethnically overwhelmingly Ukrainian, but also contains small minority groups from the Post-Soviet Realm. The exact ethnic and linguitic composition was as follows:

Ethnic groups in Bashtanka
	percent
Ukrainians	93.67%
Russians	4.30%
Belarusians	0.86%
Moldovans	0.40%
Armenians	0.27%
Bulgarians	0.10%
others	0.40%

First languages (2001)
	percent
Ukrainian	95.0%
Russian	4.1%
Moldovan	0.3%
Armenian	0.2%
Belarusian	0.2%
others	0.1%
