= Novyi Buh =

City in Mykolaiv Oblast, Ukraine

Novyi Buh Новий Буг
- City
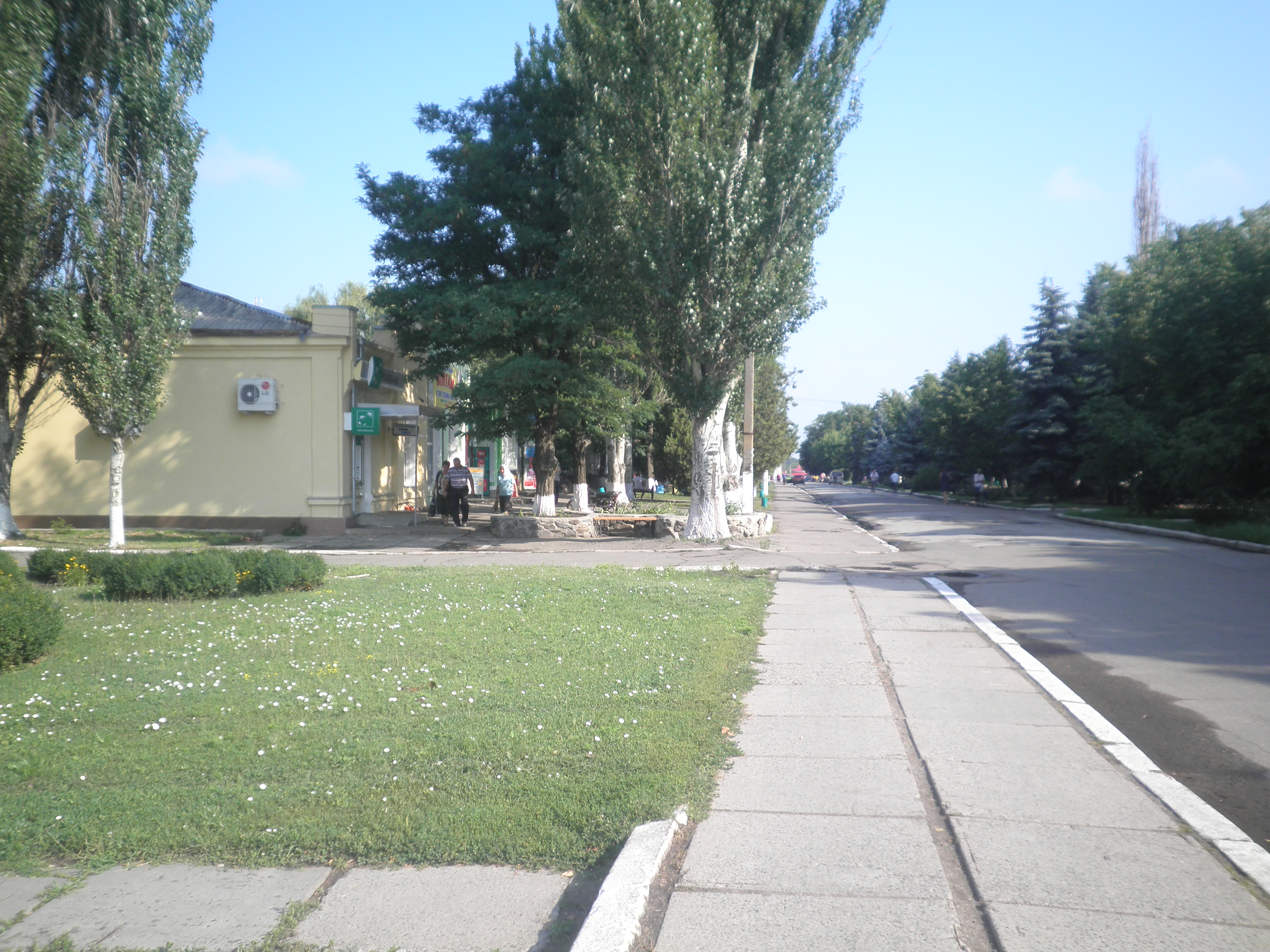
- A street

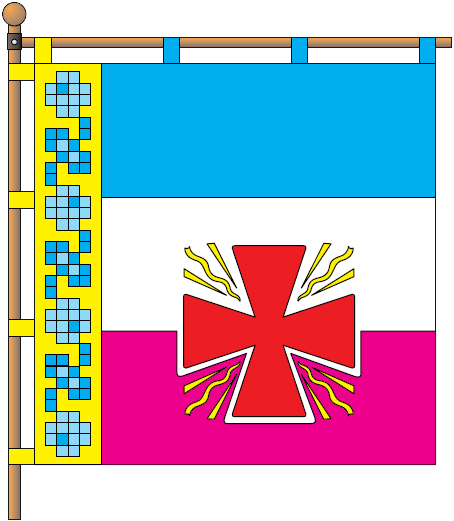
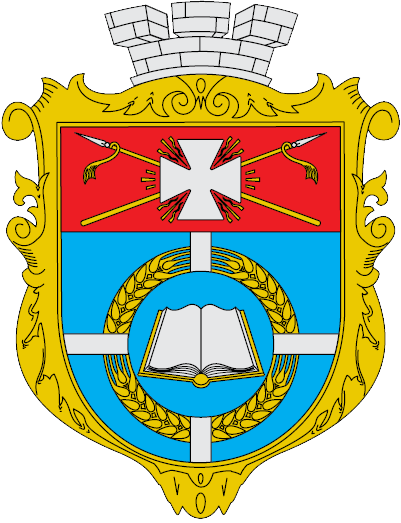
- Flag Coat of arms
- Interactive map of Novyi Buh
- Location of Novyi Buh Novyi Buh (Mykolaiv Oblast)
- Coordinates: 47°41′N 32°30′E
- Country: Ukraine
- Oblast: Mykolaiv Oblast
- Raion: Bashtanka Raion
- Metropolitan area: Kryvyi Rih metropolitan area
- Hromada: Novyi Buh urban hromada
- Founded: 1810

Government
  - Mayor: Andrij Shevchuk

Area
  - Total: 12 km^{2} (4.6 sq mi)

Population (November 2022)
  - Total: 15,000
  - Density: 1,200/km^{2} (3,200/sq mi)
- Postal code: 55600

Novyi Buh (Ukrainian: Новий Буг, pronounced [ˈnɔwɪj ˈbuɦ]) is a city in Bashtanka Raion, Mykolaiv Oblast, Bashtanka Raion, Kryvyi Rih metropolitan area, Ukraine. It hosts the administration of Novyi Buh urban hromada, one of the hromadas of Ukraine. Population: 14,782 (2022 estimate). In 2001, population was 16,250. The Inhul River Park partly falls within the town.

== History ==
During WWII Novyi Buh was occupied by German forces in August 1941.

Novopoltavka, south of Novyi Buh, was one of southern Ukraine’s largest Jewish agricultural colonies. In late 1941, its Jewish population was murdered in mass shootings. The remains of the Novopoltavka Jewish Cemetery mark the former community.

Novyi Buh was liberated on March 8, 1944 during the Bereznegovatoye–Snigirevka Offensive.

Until 18 July 2020, Novyi Buh was the administrative center of Novyi Buh Raion. In July 2020, as part of the administrative reform of Ukraine, which reduced the number of raions of Mykolaiv Oblast to four, Novyi Buh Raion was merged into Bashtanka Raion.

== Demographics ==
As of the Ukrainian national census in 2001, Novyi Buh had a population of 16,200 people. In terms of ethnic backgrounds, the overwhelming majority of the population are ethnic Ukrainians, while a number of small minorities also exists in the city. The Ukrainian language is the first language of almost 95% of the city's population. The exact ethnic and linguistic composition was as follows:

Ethnic groups in Novyi Buh
	percent
Ukrainians	93.38%
Russians	4.38%
Moldovans	0.66%
Belarusians	0.59%
Armenians	0.51%
Poles	0.08%
Azerbaijanis	0.07%
others	0.33%

Native languages (2001)
	percent
Ukrainian	94.5%
Russian	4.5%
Moldovan	0.4%
Armenian	0.4%
Belarusian	0.2%
others	0.1%

== Notable people ==
- Stepan Dybets (1887–1937), Ukrainian anarchist communist
