= Bereznehuvate Raion =

Former subdivision of Mykolaiv Oblast, Ukraine

Bereznehuvate Raion Березнегуватський район
- Raion
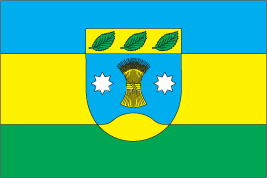
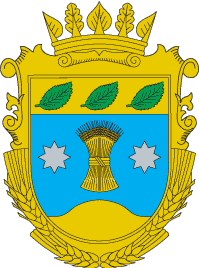
- Flag Coat of arms

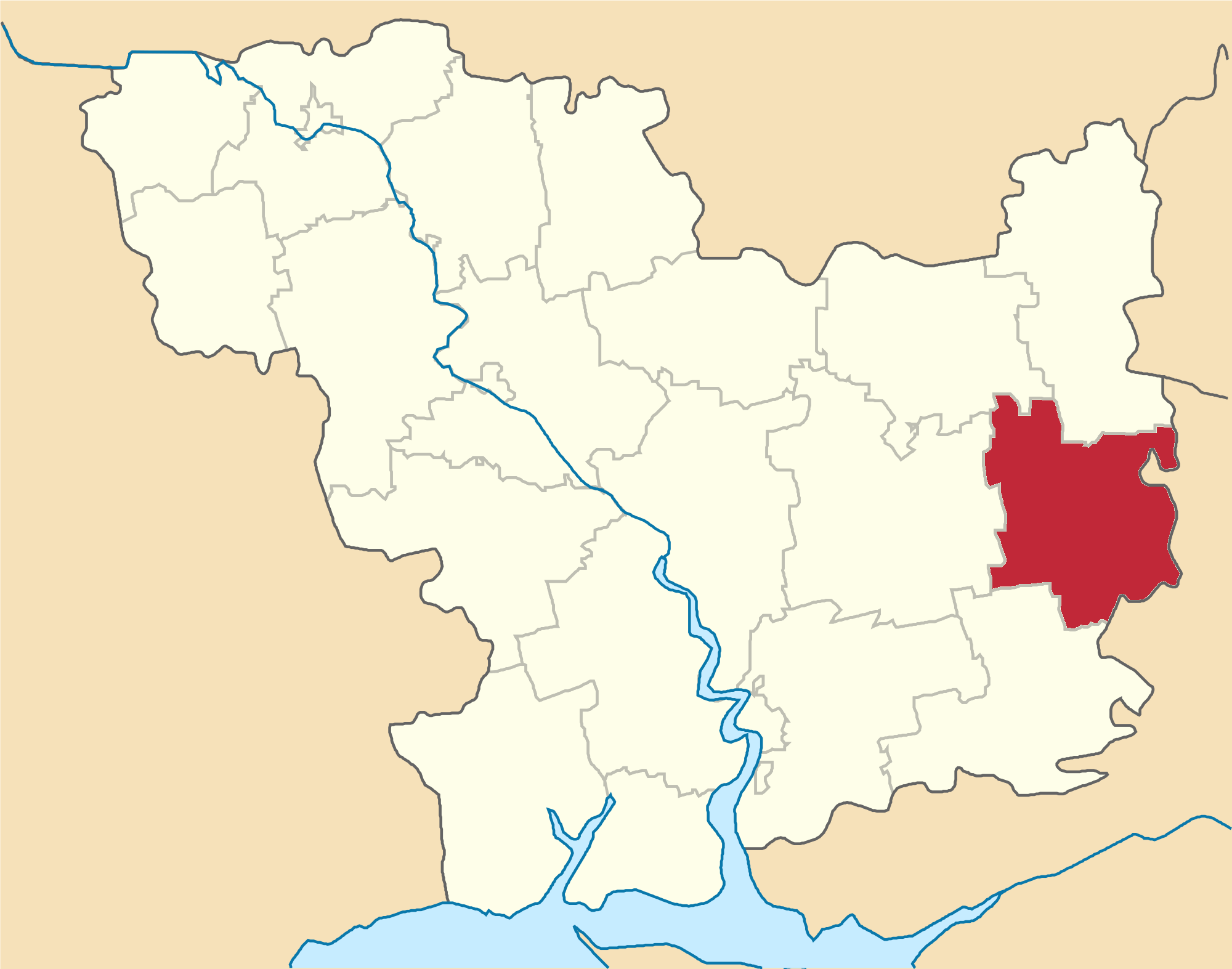
- Coordinates: 47°20′49″N 32°52′38″E
- Country: Ukraine
- Oblast: Mykolaiv Oblast
- Established: 1923
- Disestablished: 18 July 2020
- Admin. center: Bereznehuvate
- Subdivisions: List: 0 — city councils; 1 — settlement councils; 14 — rural councils; Number of localities: 0 — cities; 1 — urban-type settlements; 21 — villages; 2 — rural settlements

Government
  - Governor: Anatoliy Kruts

Area
  - Total: 1,263 km^{2} (488 sq mi)

Population (2020)
  - Total: 19,344 ▼
  - Density: 15.32/km^{2} (39.67/sq mi)
- Time zone: UTC+02:00 (EET)
  - Summer (DST): UTC+03:00 (EEST)
- Postal index: 56200—56254
- Area code: +380 5168

Bereznehuvate Raion (Ukrainian: Березнегуватський район) was a subdivision of Mykolaiv Oblast of Ukraine. Its administrative center was the urban-type settlement of Bereznehuvate. The raion was abolished on 18 July 2020 as part of the administrative reform of Ukraine, which reduced the number of raions in Mykolaiv Oblast to four. The area of Bereznehuvate Raion was merged into Bashtanka Raion. The last estimate of the raion population was 19,344 (2020 est.)

== History ==
Administratively, since 1776 the area belonged to Khersonsky Uyezd, which was shuffled between different governorates of the Russian Empire: Yekaterinoslav Viceroyalty until 1795, Voznesensk Viceroyalty until 1796, Novorossiya Governorate until 1803, Kherson Governorate until 1920, Nikolayev Governorate until 1921, and Odesa Governorate until 1923, when uyezds were abolished in the Ukrainian Soviet Socialist Republic; the governorates were divided into okruhas. In 1923, Bereznehuvate Raion of Kherson Okruha, with the administrative center in Bereznehuvate, was established. In 1925, the governorates were abolished, and okruhas were directly subordinated to the Ukrainian SSR. In 1930, okruhas were abolished. In 1935, Bereznehuvate Raion was transferred into Odesa Oblast. On 22 September 1937, Mykolaiv Oblast was established on lands that previously belonged to Dnipropetrovsk Oblast and Odesa Oblasts, and Bereznehuvate Raion became part of newly created Mykolaiv Oblast.

In March and April 1944, the Bereznegovatoye–Snigirevka Offensive, a part of the major Dnieper–Carpathian Offensive of the Soviet army during the last phase of World War II, took place around Bereznehuvate.

At the time of disestablishment, the raion consisted of one hromada, Bereznehuvate settlement hromada with the administration in Bereznehuvate.
