= Bashtanka Raion =

Subdivision of Mykolaiv Oblast, Ukraine

Bashtanka Raion Баштанський район
- Raion
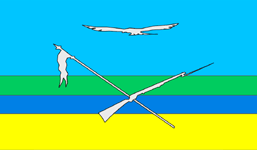
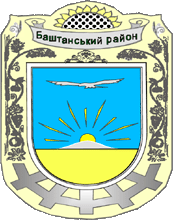
- Flag Coat of arms

- Coordinates: 47°20′59″N 32°21′49″E
- Country: Ukraine
- Oblast: Mykolaiv Oblast
- Admin. center: Bashtanka
- Subdivisions: 12 hromadas

Government
  - Governor: Natalia Oliynyk

Area
  - Total: 6,706 km^{2} (2,589 sq mi)

Population (2022)
  - Total: 134,234
  - Density: 20.02/km^{2} (51.84/sq mi)
- Time zone: UTC+02:00 (EET)
  - Summer (DST): UTC+03:00 (EEST)
- Postal index: 56100—56182
- Area code: +380 5158

Bashtanka Raion (Ukrainian: Баштанський район) is a raion (district) in Mykolaiv Oblast, Ukraine. Its administrative center is the city of Bashtanka. Population: 134,234 (2022 estimate).

On 19 July 2020, as part of Ukraine's administrative reform, the number of raions of Mykolaiv Oblast was reduced to four, and the area of Bashtanka Raion was significantly expanded. Four abolished raions, Bereznehuvate, Kazanka, Novyi Buh, and Snihurivka Raions, were merged into Bashtanka Raion. Before the reform, the raion's population was estimated at 36,507 (2020 est.).

== Subdivisions ==
=== Current ===
After the reform in July 2020, the raion consisted of 12 hromadas:

- Bashtanka urban hromada with the administration in the city of Bashtanka, retained from Bashtanka Raion;
- Bereznehuvate settlement hromada with the administration in the rural settlement of Bereznehuvate, transferred from Bereznehuvate Raion;
- Horokhivske rural hromada with the administration in the selo of Horokhivske, transferred from Snihurivka Raion;
- Inhulka rural hromada with the administration in the selo of Inhulka, retained from Bashtanka Raion;
- Kazanka settlement hromada with the administration in the rural settlement of Kazanka, transferred from Kazanka Raion;
- Novyi Buh urban hromada with the administration in the city of Novyi Buh, transferred from Novyi Buh Raion;
- Pryvilne rural hromada with the administration in the selo of Pryvilne, retained from Bashtanka Raion;
- Shyroke rural hromada with the administration in the selo of Shyroke, transferred from Snihurivka Raion;
- Snihurivka urban hromada with the administration in the city of Snihurivka, transferred from Snihurivka Raion;
- Sofiivka rural hromada with the administration in the selo of Sofiivka, transferred from Novyi Buh Raion;
- Vilne Zaporizhzhia rural hromada with the administration in the selo of Vilne Zaporizhzhia, transferred from Novyi Buh Raion;
- Volodymyrivka rural hromada with the administration in the selo of Volodymyrivka, transferred from Kazanka Raion.

=== Before 2020 ===
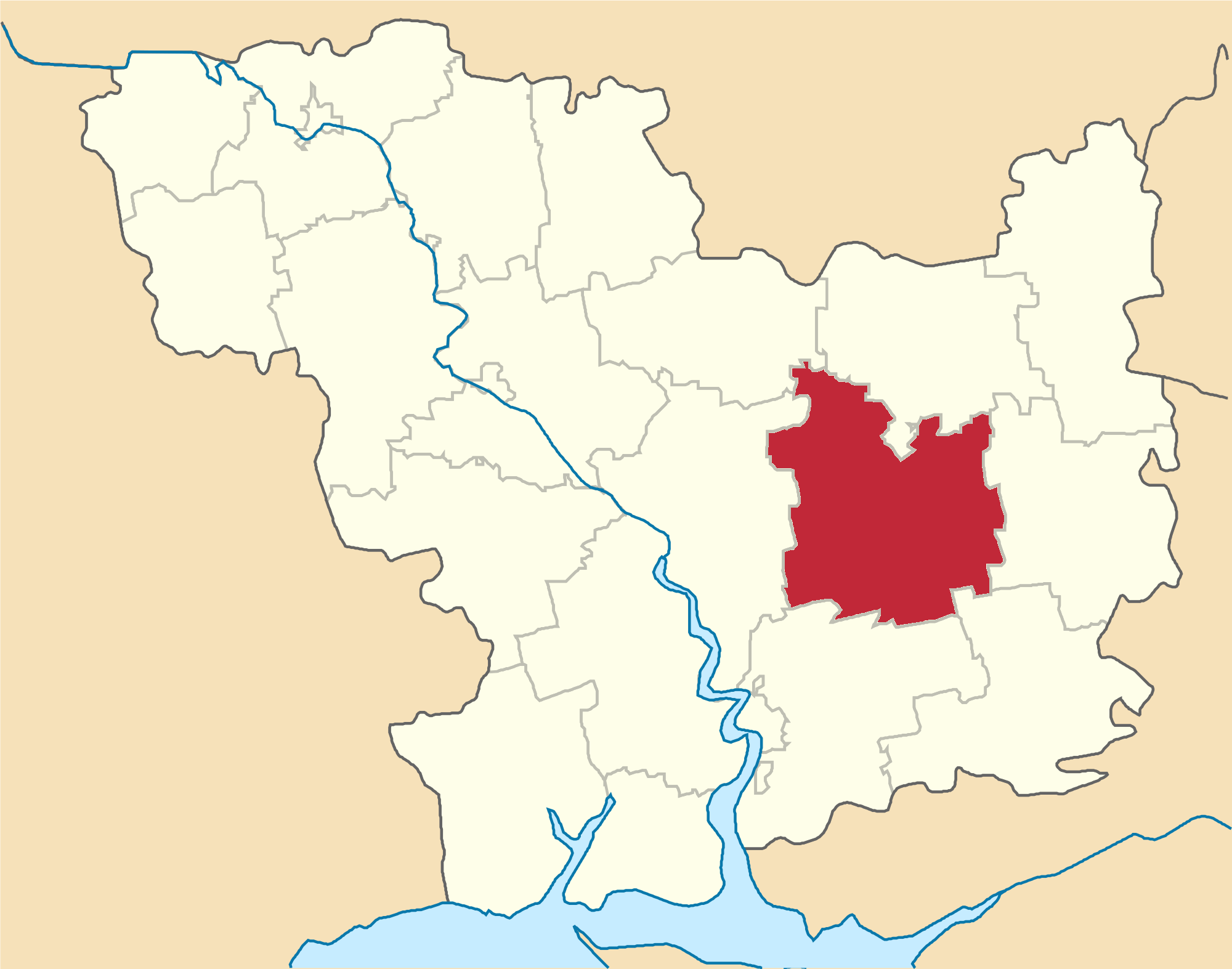
Bashtanka Raion in Mykolaiv Oblast before 2020

Before the 2020 reform, the raion consisted of three hromadas,

- Bashtanka urban hromada with the administration in Bashtanka;
- Inhulka rural hromada with the administration in Inhulka;
- Pryvilne rural hromada with the administration in Pryvilne.
