= Mykolaiv Oblast =

Oblast (region) of Ukraine

Mykolaiv Oblast Миколаївська область
- Oblast
- Mykolaivska oblast
- Flag Coat of arms
- Nickname: Миколаївщина (Mykolaivshchyna)
- Interactive map of Mykolaiv Oblast in Ukraine
- Coordinates: 47.43°N 31.80°E
- Country: Ukraine
- Administrative center: Mykolaiv

Government
  - Governor: Heorhiy Reshetilov (acting)
  - Oblast council: 64 seats
  - Chairperson: Anton Tabunshchyk

Area
  - Oblast: 24,598 km^{2} (9,497 sq mi)
  - Rank: Ranked 14th

Population (2022)
  - Oblast: 1,091,821
  - Rank: Ranked 18th
  - Density: 44.387/km^{2} (114.96/sq mi)
  - Urban: 750,698
  - Rural: 341,123

GDP
  - Total: ₴ 124 billion (€3.2 billion)
  - Per capita: ₴ 112,864 (€2,900)
- Time zone: UTC+2 (EET)
  - Summer (DST): UTC+3 (EEST)
- Postal code: 54000-56999
- Area code: +380-51
- ISO 3166 code: UA-48
- Raions: 4
- Cities: 10
- Settlements: 17
- Villages: 820
- HDI (2022): 0.740 high
- FIPS 10-4: UP16
- NUTS statistical regions of Ukraine: UA41
- Website: www.mk.gov.ua www.mk-oblrada.gov.ua

Mykolaiv Oblast (Ukrainian: Миколаївська область, romanized: Mykolaivska oblast, IPA: [mɪkoˈlɑjiu̯sʲkɐ ˈɔblɐsʲtʲ]), also referred to as Mykolaivshchyna (Ukrainian: Миколаївщина, IPA: [mɪkoˈlɑjiu̯ʃtʃɪnɐ]), is an oblast (province) of Ukraine. The administrative center of the oblast is the city of Mykolaiv. At the most recent estimate, the population of the oblast stood at 1,091,821 (2022 estimate).

== History ==
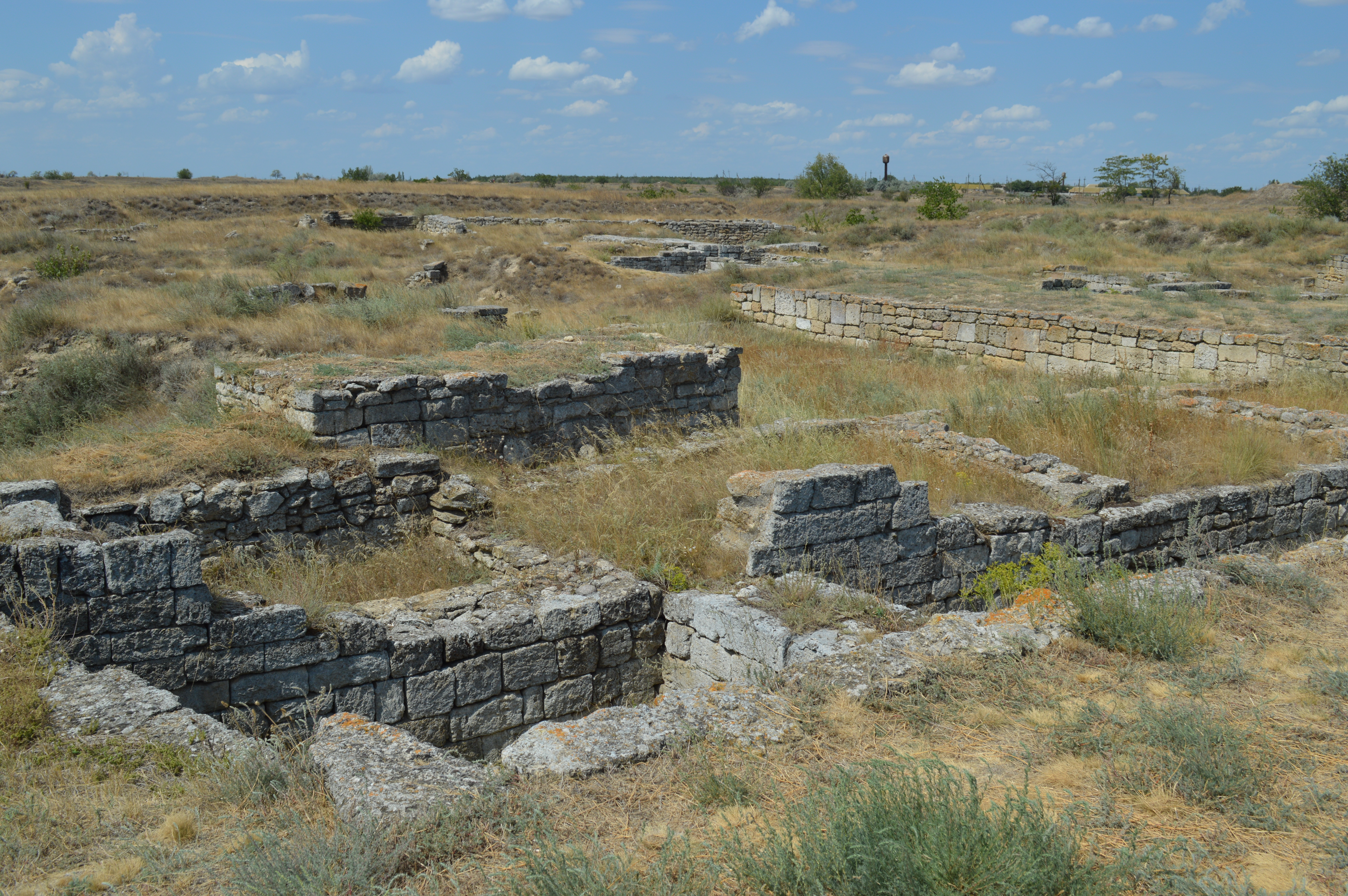
Ruins of Olbia

Historically, at various times, the territory was ruled either entirely or partly by Scythia, the ancient Greeks, Old Great Bulgaria, the Khazars, the Kipchaks, the Mongol Empire, the Grand Duchy of Lithuania, the Crimean Khanate, the Ottoman Empire, the Kingdom of Poland and the Russian Empire. Historic cities of particular importance included ancient Olbia and the late medieval port city of Ochakiv.

In the late 17th and 18th centuries, the tripoint of three early modern great powers, the Polish–Lithuanian Commonwealth, the Ottoman Empire and Russia, was located at the site of present-day Pervomaisk, now the second-largest city in Mykolaiv Oblast. The modern city was formed by the merger of the former Polish town of Bohopol, the Russian town of Olviopol and the Ottoman settlement of Holta, later known as Golta.

The eastern part of the modern oblast encompassed the Bugo-Hard Palanka, where, according to the 1756 Zaporozhian Host Register, only 8,000 people resided; due to frequent Crimean Tatar raids, they lived predominantly on remote, fortified farmsteads for defensive reasons.

=== Jewish history ===
Jewish communities developed in the region during the period of the Russian Empire, when much of the territory formed part of the Pale of Settlement. Jews participated extensively in commerce, crafts and the economic development of the region. The port and shipbuilding city of Mykolaiv, founded in 1789, developed one of the area's largest Jewish communities. Jews were present there from the city's earliest years, many having migrated from Galicia.

The Russian government prohibited most Jews from residing in Mykolaiv in 1829 because of its status as an important naval base, although implementation of the expulsion was delayed. Restrictions were gradually relaxed beginning in the 1850s and were removed in 1866, after which the Jewish population grew rapidly. There were 8,325 Jews in Mykolaiv in 1880. By the 1897 census, the number had increased to 20,109, representing 21.8 percent of the city's population. The community maintained synagogues, houses of prayer, schools and charitable organizations. Jews suffered during outbreaks of anti-Jewish violence in 1881 and 1899, while Jewish self-defence organizations helped prevent a pogrom in the city during the Revolution of 1905.

Jewish communities also existed in towns and villages throughout what is now Mykolaiv Oblast, particularly in the western districts adjoining the Southern Bug. Under Soviet rule, traditional Jewish religious and communal institutions were restricted, while Jews increasingly participated in industry and urban life. In 1926, Mykolaiv itself had 21,786 Jewish residents, approximately 20.8 percent of its population. The city supported Yiddish-language educational and judicial institutions during the 1920s. By 1939, 25,280 Jews lived in Mykolaiv, constituting approximately 15.2 percent of the city's population.

=== World War II and the Holocaust ===
Following the Axis invasion of the Soviet Union in June 1941, the territory of present-day Mykolaiv Oblast was divided between German and Romanian occupation zones. Mykolaiv and the eastern part of the present-day oblast came under German administration, while the territory west of the Southern Bug was incorporated into the Romanian-administered Transnistria Governorate. The latter included Golta County, centred on the Golta section of present-day Pervomaisk. Transnistria became one of the principal sites of the Holocaust perpetrated by Romanian authorities, German units and local auxiliaries.

German forces occupied Mykolaiv in August 1941. In September, approximately 7,000 Jews were murdered in the vicinity of the city. The prewar Jewish community, which had numbered more than 25,000 in 1939, was largely destroyed during the German occupation.

In the Romanian occupation zone, Golta County became a major centre of mass murder. Romanian authorities concentrated local Ukrainian Jews together with tens of thousands of Jews deported from Bessarabia, Bukovina and elsewhere in Transnistria. The three principal killing camps in the county were Bogdanovka, Domanovka and Akhmechetka. Other ghettos, camps and forced-labour sites operated throughout the county.

Bogdanovka, located at a large state farm near the Southern Bug, became the largest of these killing sites. Romanian authorities confined Jews deported from Odesa, other parts of Transnistria, Bessarabia and Bukovina there. Between 25,000 and 30,000 Jews were forced to march from Odesa toward Bogdanovka beginning in October 1941. Thousands died from hunger, disease and exposure after reaching the camp. Beginning on 21 December 1941, tens of thousands of prisoners were murdered in a series of mass killings carried out by Romanian-controlled local police and ethnic German auxiliaries operating under German authority. Prisoners who were elderly or too weak to walk to the killing sites were among those burned alive in buildings.

At Domanovka, approximately 20,000 Ukrainian and Bessarabian Jews were confined between November 1941 and January 1942. About 18,000 were murdered by Romanian soldiers and police, Ukrainian auxiliaries and ethnic German units by February 1942. Survivors were subjected to starvation, disease and forced labour, and Jewish prisoners were later forced to exhume and burn the bodies of victims.

Akhmechetka, situated between Bogdanovka and Domanovka, was established at an isolated former Soviet pig farm. Romanian authorities used the camp particularly for Jews considered incapable of work. Prisoners were confined under lethal conditions with inadequate food, shelter and medical care, and thousands died or were murdered there.

The Golta section of Pervomaisk itself contained a ghetto. By the autumn of 1942 approximately 450 Jews, including deportees from Bessarabia and Bukovina, were concentrated there. Local Jews were subsequently sent to Bogdanovka, Akhmechetka and other camps, although some were later returned to Golta. Jews considered incapable of labour faced murder or transfer to Akhmechetka.

Numerous smaller detention and forced-labour sites also operated in territory now belonging to Mykolaiv Oblast. These included the Bobric camp and Slivina. At Slivina, now Slyvyne, Jewish prisoners were used for forced labour in 1943, including construction work associated with a bridge across the Southern Bug toward Mykolaiv.

Romanian authorities also carried out deportations of Roma to Transnistria, including locations in and around Golta County. Across Transnistria, the Romanian government deported an estimated 25,000 Roma, of whom at least 11,000 died from deprivation and maltreatment or were murdered.

The Red Army recaptured the region in the spring of 1944. Mykolaiv was liberated in March 1944, ending the German and Romanian occupations of the territory of the present-day oblast.

=== Postwar period ===
The oblast had been established within Soviet Ukraine in 1937. Following the end of World War II, it remained part of the Ukrainian SSR. Jewish survivors and evacuees returned to Mykolaiv after the war. The city had approximately 15,800 Jewish residents in 1959, although Soviet restrictions on Jewish religious life continued and the last synagogue was closed by the authorities in 1962. The Jewish population subsequently declined as a result of assimilation and, particularly from the late Soviet period onward, emigration.

In the 1991 referendum, 89.45% of votes in Mykolaiv Oblast were in favor of the Declaration of Independence of Ukraine. A survey conducted in December 2014 by the Kyiv International Institute of Sociology found 2.1% of the oblast's population supported their region joining Russia, 95.5% did not support the idea, and the rest were undecided or did not respond.

During the 2022 Russian invasion of Ukraine, the Russian army invaded the oblast from Kherson Oblast, advancing as far northwest as Voznesensk. Russian forces were repulsed at Voznesensk, and their attempt to capture Mykolaiv failed. From April 2022, almost all of the oblast remained under Ukrainian control, apart from the extreme southeast and the Kinburn Peninsula. When Russia announced the annexation of Kherson Oblast in September 2022, its claims incorporated Russian-occupied areas of Mykolaiv Oblast. A Ukrainian military official announced the Russian withdrawal from Mykolaiv Oblast on 10 November 2022.

On 4–5 July 2022, during the international Ukraine Recovery Conference in Lugano, Switzerland pledged to support the reconstruction of Mykolaiv Oblast.

== Geography ==
Mykolaiv Oblast is in the southern half of Ukraine. It has an area of 24,598 km², which is 4.1% of Ukraine.

Mykolaiv Oblast borders Odesa Oblast in the west-southwest, Kirovohrad Oblast in the north, Dnipropetrovsk Oblast in the northeast, and Kherson Oblast on the southeast. To the south, the oblast is also bordered by the Black Sea. Discontiguous parts of Mykolaiv Oblast include the western half of Kinburn Peninsula, Berezan Island in the Black Sea, and Pervomaisky Island in Dnieper Estuary.

Historically, it is located in Yedisan (the central and southern parts), Zaporizhzhia (the northern part) and Podolia (the north-western part). Pervomaisk, the second largest city of the province, is at the tripoint of the three historic regions.

Mykolaiv Oblast is on a plain that slopes gently to the south. Most of it is in the Black Sea Lowland. To the north there are spurs of the Podolian and Dnieper uplands. There are eighty-five rivers, which are in the Black Sea catchment. The main ones there are the Southern Bug (Boh), which splits the oblast into eastern and western parts, the Inhulets, and Berezan. Among major valuable deposits and minerals there are nickel, uranium ores, granite, gneiss, quartzites.

The climate is moderately continental, with mild winters of little snow, and hot arid summers.

== Points of interest ==
The following historic-cultural sites were nominated for the Seven Wonders of Ukraine or Seven Natural Wonders of Ukraine.

- Olbia, an ancient ruins of Greek colony near Parutyne
- Black Sea Biosphere Reserve, located near Kinburn Peninsula
- Granite-steppe lands of Buh, a landscape park located up north towards Podolia
- Inhul River Park, a landscape park in eastern part of the region
- Tylihul landscape park, on the administrative border with Odesa Oblast
- Dykyi Sad archaeological site (Wild Garden) in the city of Mykolaiv

There are 41 monuments of national significance in Mykolaiv Oblast.

== Demographics ==
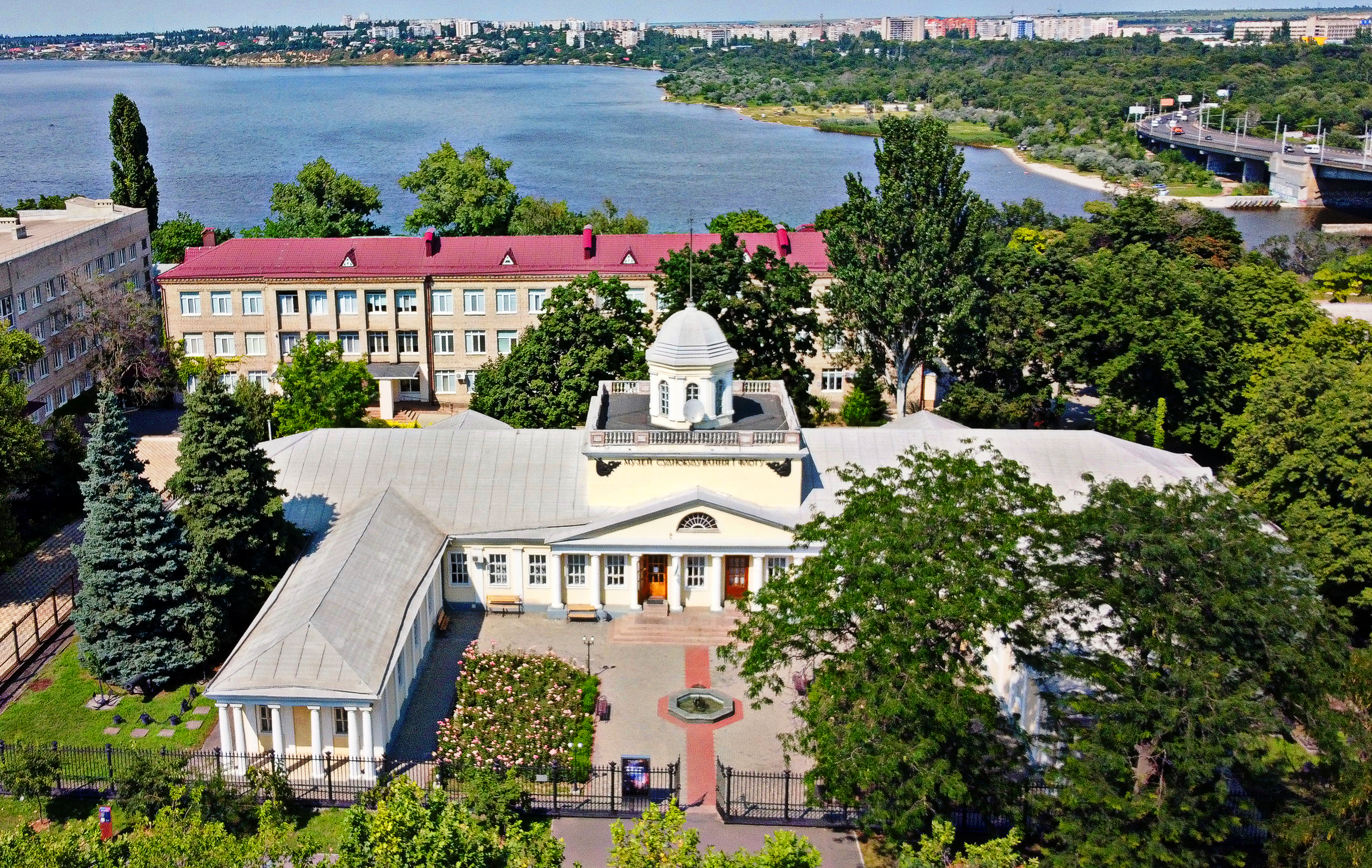
Mykolaiv, capital and largest city of the oblast and a major port city

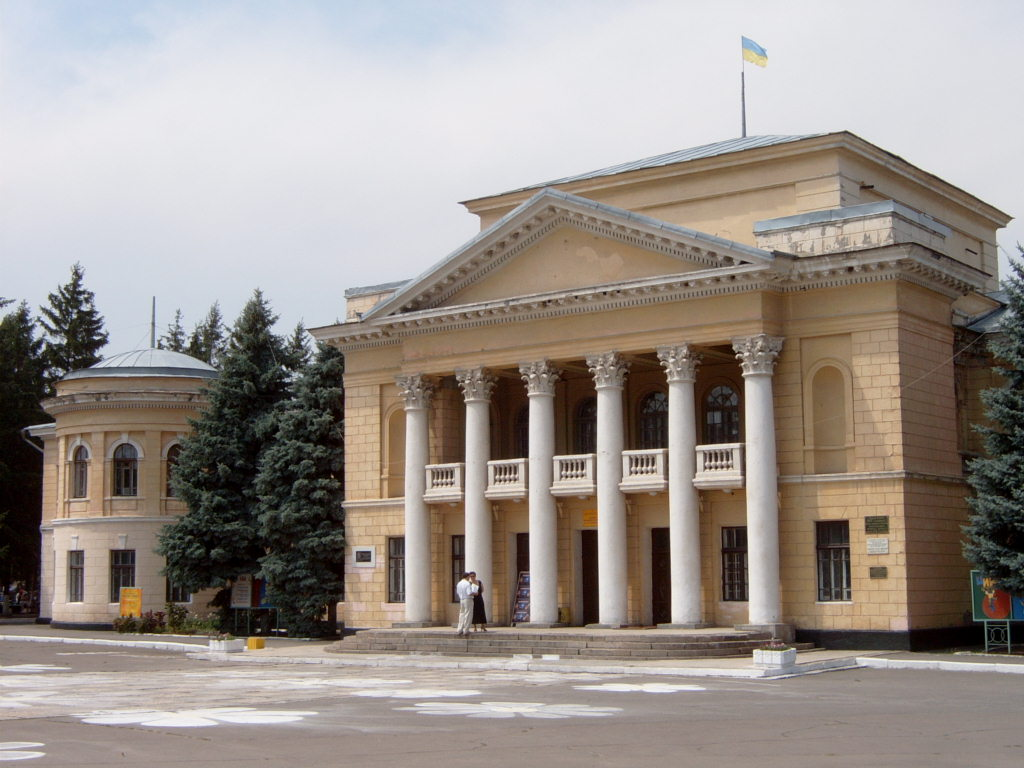
Pervomaisk, second largest city of the oblast, created by merger of the towns of Bohopil, Holta and Olviopol

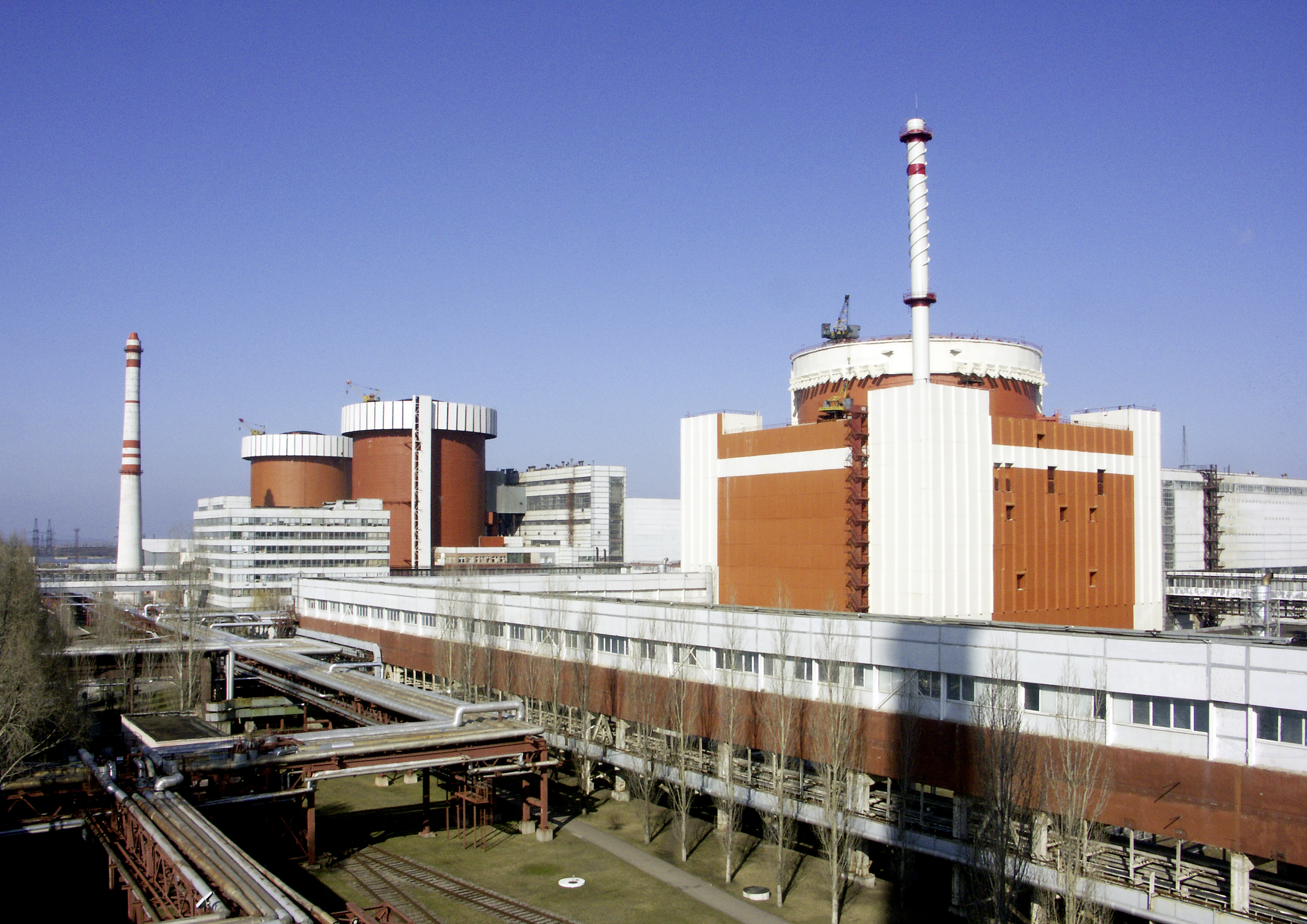
Pivdennoukrainsk, third largest city of the oblast, home to the South Ukraine Nuclear Power Plant

The estimated population was 1.2 million people in 2005. The greater part of the oblast's population resided in urban type settlements (66%), with the remainder residing in agricultural areas. Also, almost 60% of the urban population resided in Mykolaiv, the industrial, cultural and administrative center of Mykolaiv Oblast.

As of 2021, the total population of the oblast was estimated at 1,108,394 inhabitants, with 761,278 (68.7%) residing in urban areas and the remaining 347,116 (31.3%) living in rural areas. The city of Mykolaiv, home to 341,123 residents, constituted 68.8% of the urban population of Mykolaiv Oblast.

The oblast's population density is one of the lowest in Ukraine – 45 inhabitants per square kilometre (120/sq mi). Mykolaiv Oblast contains 2.7% of the population of Ukraine, by percentage share ranking 19th among Ukrainian oblasts and territories.

=== Age structure ===
0-14 years: 14.7% ▲ (male 88,668/female 83,434)
15-64 years: 70.7% ▼ (male 396,342/female 432,808)
65 years and over: 14.6% (male 56,527/female 114,987) (2013 official)

=== Median age ===
total: 39.7 years ▲
male: 36.3 years ▲
female: 42.9 years ▲ (2013 official)

=== Ethnicity, language and citizenship ===
The oblast has a multi-ethnic composition; people of more than 100 ethnicities (national groups) live in the oblast. As of 2001, Ukrainian was the most common native language in the oblast, while Russian was the second most common. In the city of Mykolaiv, the most common native language was Russian.

At the time of the 2001 census, the oblast had 1,269,900 permanent residents. Of these:

- 1,251,100 (99.1%) had Ukrainian citizenship.
- 6,400 had citizenship of CIS countries.
- 10,200 had citizenship of other countries.
- 4,200 were without citizenship.
- 1,000 who did not specify their citizenship.

Ethnicity ("Nationality")	Permanent residents 2001		Mother Tongue 2001		Permanent residents 1989	Mother Tongue 1989	
Ethnicity ("Nationality")	Number	%	Ukrainian	Russian	%	Ukrainian	Russian
All ethnicities	1,269,900	100.0%	69.2%	29.3%	100.0%	64.2%	33.8%
Ukrainian	1,034,400	81.9%	82.4%	17.5%	75.6%		
Russian	177,500	14.1%	6.2%	93.7%	19.4%		
Moldovan	13,200	1.0%	28.5%	16.8%	1.3%		
Belarusian	8,400	0.7%	21.8%	58.5%	1.1%		
Bulgarian	5,600	0.4%	16.9%	53.2%	0.5%		
Armenian	4,300	0.3%	7.1%	35.8%	0.1%		
Jewish	3,300	0.3%	10.1%	87.4%	0.9%		
Korean	1,800	0.1%	6.3%	70.8%	0.0%		
Azerbaijani	1,500	0.1%	8.1%	33.3%	0.1%		
Gypsy (Roma)	1,400	0.1%	38.7%	15.2%	0.1%		
Polish	1,300	0.1%	47.4%	44.1%	0.2%		
Tatar	1,300	0.1%	7.3%	73.5%	0.1%		
German	1,200	0.1%	26.8%	67.7%	0.1%		
Other	7,700	0.7%	13.8%	37.3%	0.5%		

== Administrative divisions ==
Mykolaiv Oblast formed in September 1937. it is subdivided into various areas, mostly raions. The subdivisions changed in 2020.

=== Administrative divisions (18 July 2020 to present) ===
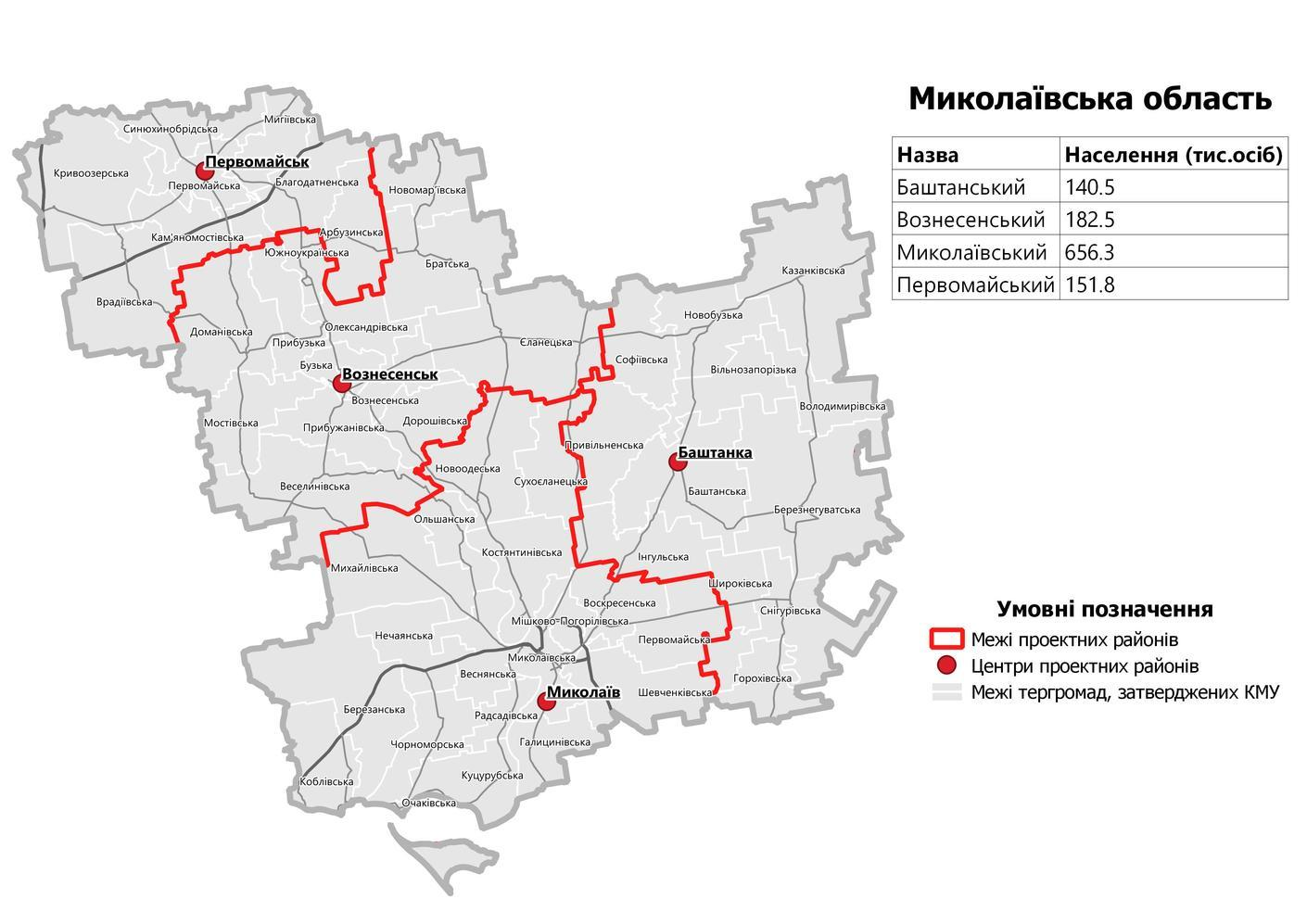
Raions of Mykolaiv Oblast since July 2020

On 18 July 2020, the number of Mykolaiv Oblast subdivisions was reduced to four raions. These are:

1. Bashtanka (Баштанський район), the center is in the town of Bashtanka;
2. Mykolaiv (Миколаївський район), the center is in the city of Mykolaiv;
3. Pervomaisk (Первомайський район), the center is in the town of Pervomaisk;
4. Voznesensk (Вознесенський район), the center is in the town of Voznesensk.

=== Administrative divisions (to 17 July 2020) ===
Former raions of Mykolaiv Oblast as of June 2020. The city of Mykolaiv is shown in dark blue. (The border betweeen Snihurivka Raion and Kherson Oblast is shown incorrectly.)

Before July 2020, Mykolaiv Oblast was subdivided into 24 regions: 19 raions (administrative districts) and 5 city municipalities (mis'krada or misto), officially known as territories governed by city councils which are directly subordinate to the oblast government.

Name	Ukrainian Name	Area (km^{2})	Population census 2015	Admin.center	Urban Population Only
Mykolaiv	Миколаїв	260	493,860	Mykolaiv	493,860
Pervomaisk	Первомайськ	25	66,677	Pervomaisk	66,677
Voznesensk	Вознесенськ	23	35,520	Voznesensk	35,520
Yuzhnoukrainsk	Южноукраїнськ	24	40,353	Yuzhnoukrainsk	40,353
Arbuzynka Raion	Арбузинський район	969	20,198	Arbuzynka	8,543
Bashtanka Raion	Баштанський район	1,706	37,721	Bashtanka	12,640
Berezanka Raion	Березанський район	1,378	23,409	Berezanka	4,120
Bereznehuvate Raion	Березнегуватський район	1,264	20,387	Bereznehuvate	7,742
Bratske Raion	Братський район	1,129	18,037	Bratske	5,325
Domanivka Raion	Доманівський район	1,458	25,500	Domanivka	6,137
Kazanka Raion	Казанківський район	1,349	19,745	Kazanka	7,207
Kryve Ozero Raion	Кривоозерський район	814	24,905	Kryve Ozero	7,823
Mykolaiv Raion	Миколаївський район	1,430	30,448	Mykolaiv	N/A *
Novyi Buh Raion	Новобузький район	1,243	31,199	Novyi Buh	15,566
Nova Odesa Raion	Новоодеський район	1,428	33,602	Nova Odesa	12,108
Ochakiv Raion	Очаківський район	1,500	29,949	Ochakiv	14,489
Pervomaisk Raion	Первомайський район	1,319	30,275	Pervomaisk	N/A *
Snihurivka Raion	Снігурівський район	1,350	40,420	Snihurivka	12,870
Veselynove Raion	Веселинівський район	1,245	23,161	Veselynove	8,060
Vitovka Raion	Вітовській район	1,460	50,565	Mykolaiv	N/A *
Voznesensk Raion	Вознесенський район	1,392	30,562	Voznesensk	N/A *
Vradiivka Raion	Врадіївський район	801	17,611	Vradiivka	8,391
Yelanets Raion	Єланецький район	1,018	15,530	Yelanets	4,912
Mykolaiv Oblast (total)	Миколаївська область	24,585	1,159,634		791,227

Note: Asterisks (*) Though the administrative center of the rayon is housed in the city/town that it is named after, cities do not answer to the rayon authorities only towns do; instead they are directly subordinated to the oblast government and therefore are not counted as part of rayon statistics.

At a lower level of administration, these district-level administrations are subdivided into:

- Settlements — 922, including:
  - Villages — 896;
  - Cities/Towns — 21, including:
    - Cities of raion subordinance — 4 (Bashtanka, Novyi Buh, Nova Odesa and Snihurivka);
    - Urban-type settlement — 17;
- Selsovets — 287.

The local administration of the oblast is controlled by the Mykolaiv Oblast Council. The governor of the oblast is the Mykolaiv Oblast Council speaker, appointed by the President of Ukraine.

== Infrastructure and economy ==
- Along the coast, there are several ports and the Mykolaiv International Airport.
- The region's railway network and infrastructure is part of the Odesa Railways.
- Through the region passes European route E58 and European route E95.
- The city of Mykolaiv is known for several of its shipyards that existed since the 19th century.
- South Ukraine Nuclear Power Plant
- Agrarian company Nibulon
- Mykolaiv Observatory

== Gallery ==
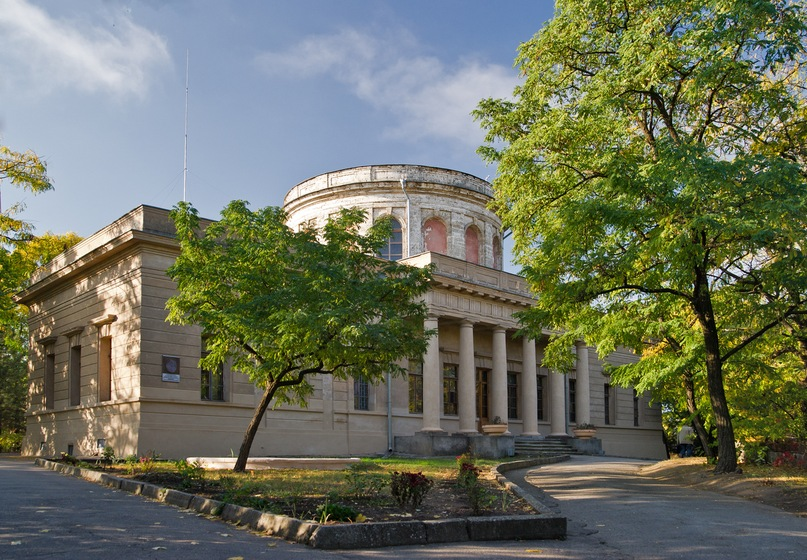
Mykolaiv Observatory

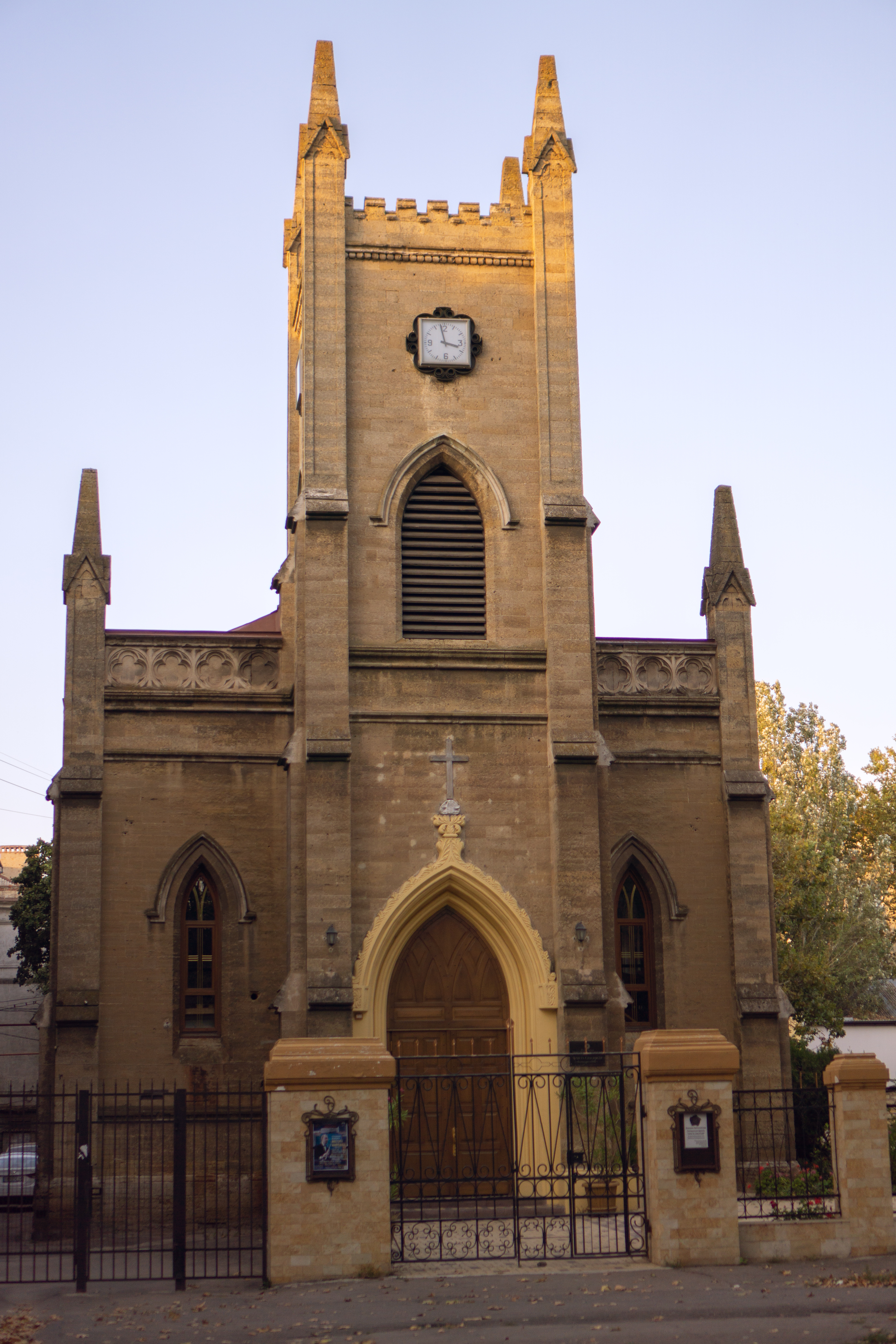
Lutheran church in Mykolaiv

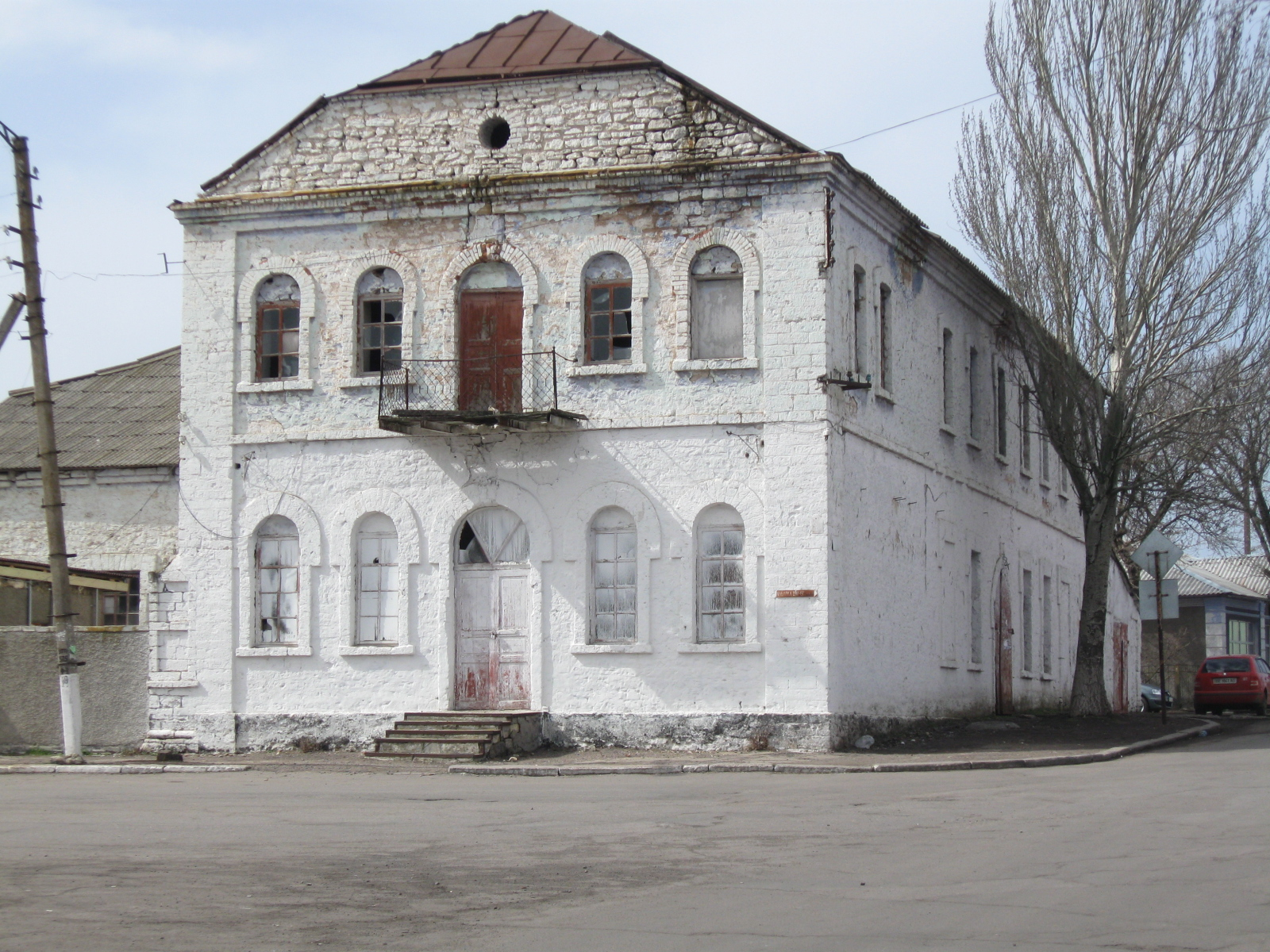
Old mill in Snihurivka

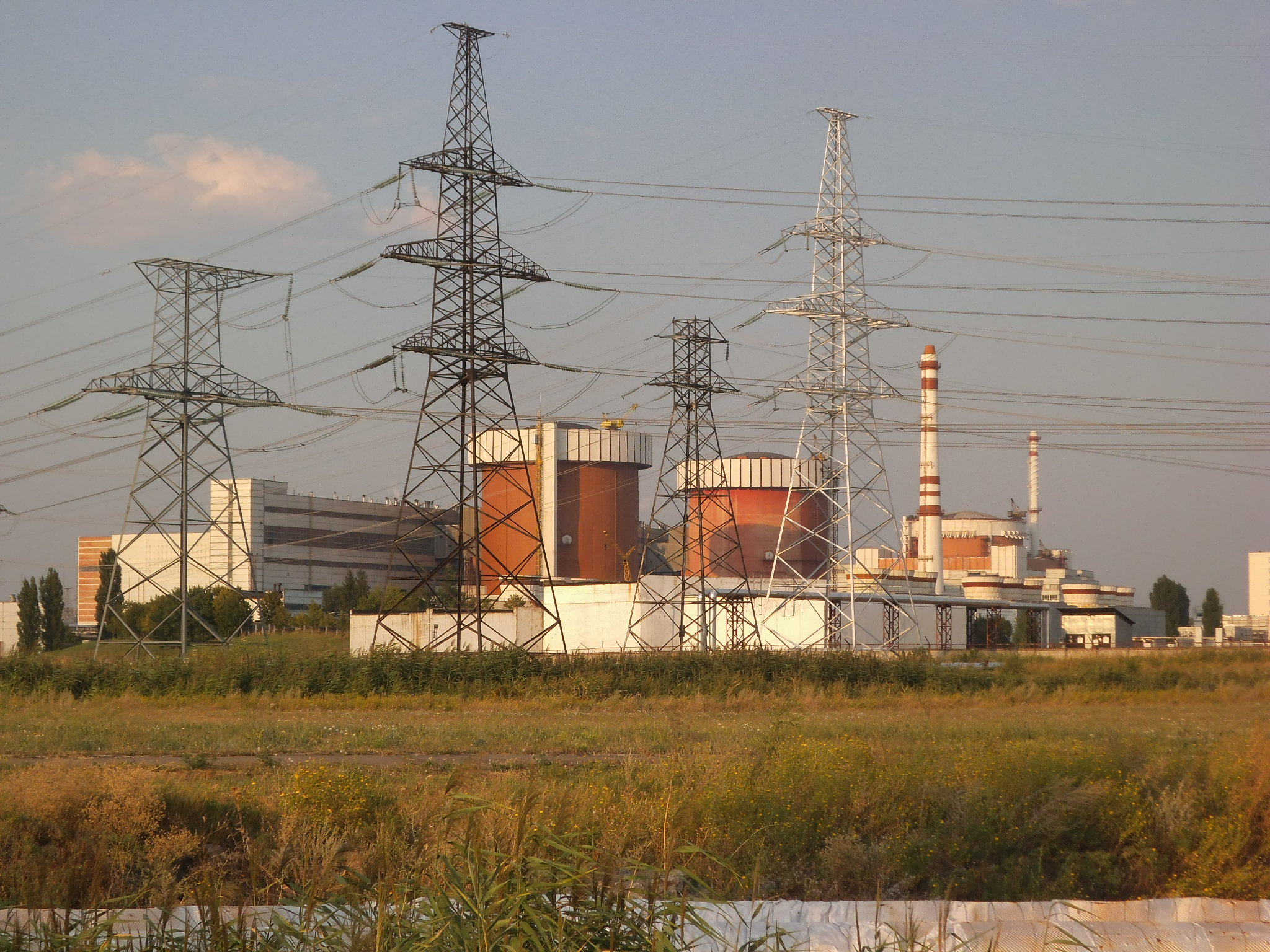
South Ukraine Nuclear Power Plant

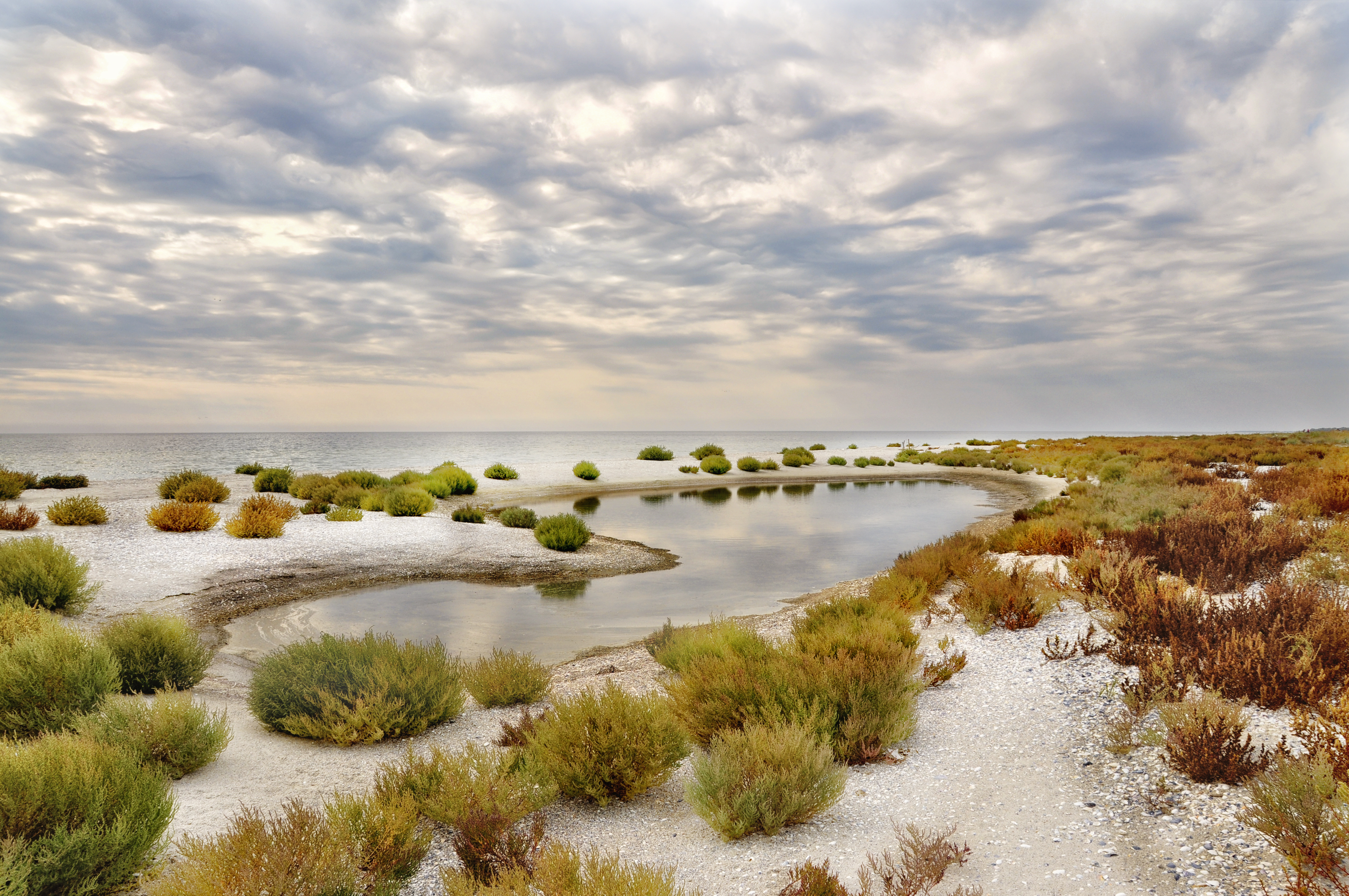
Kinburn Spit

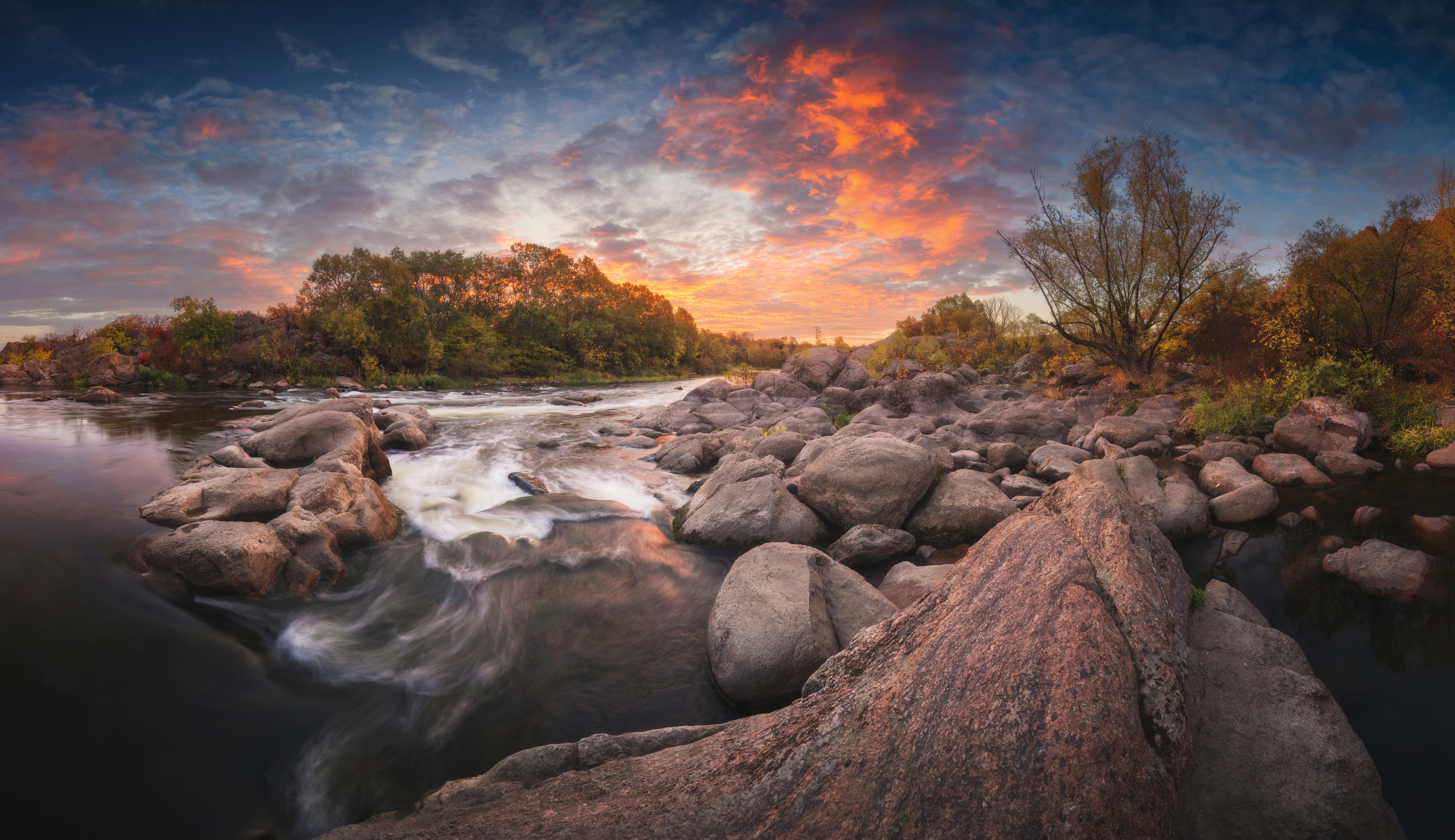
Bug River rapids

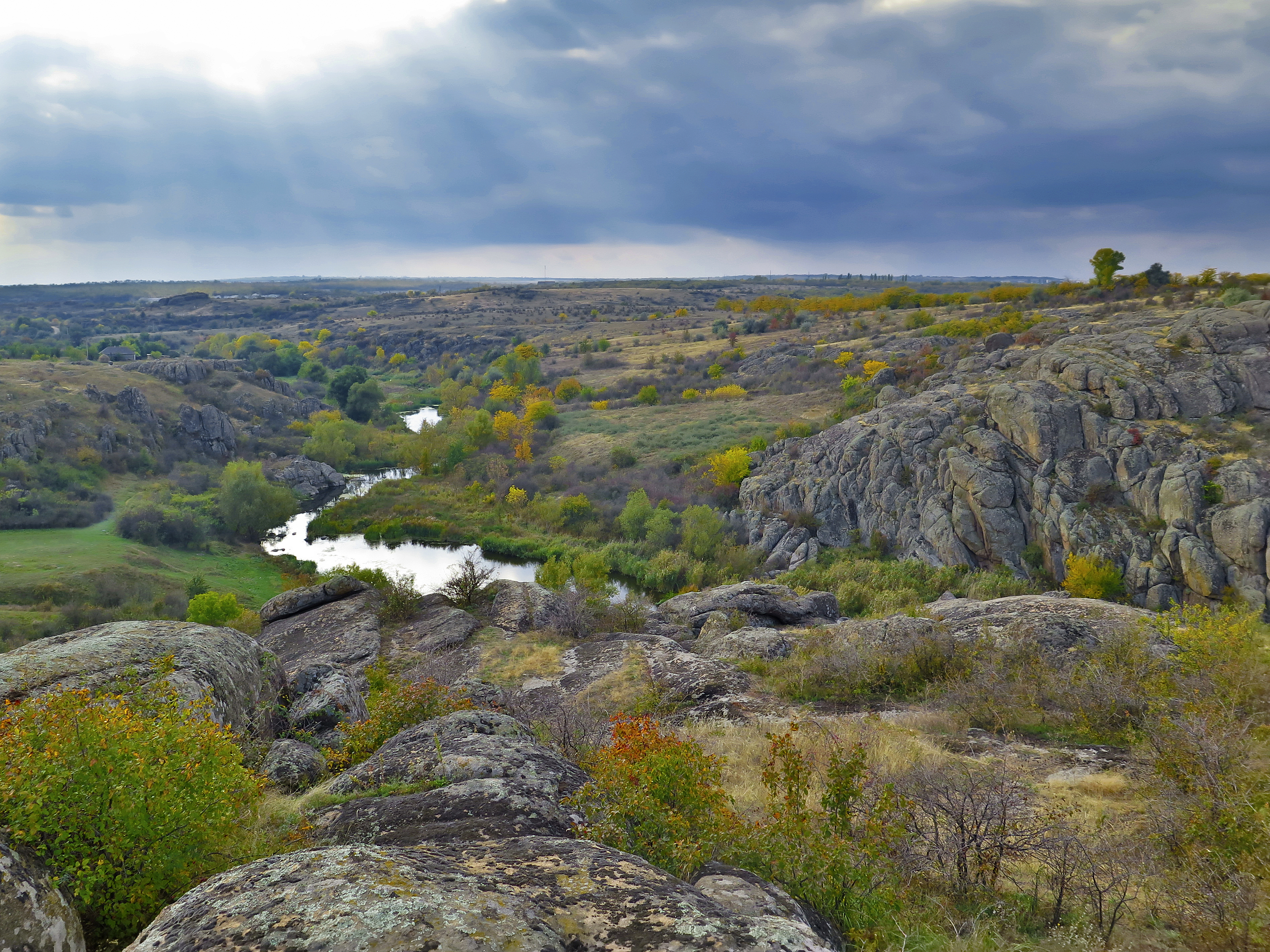
Aktove canyon

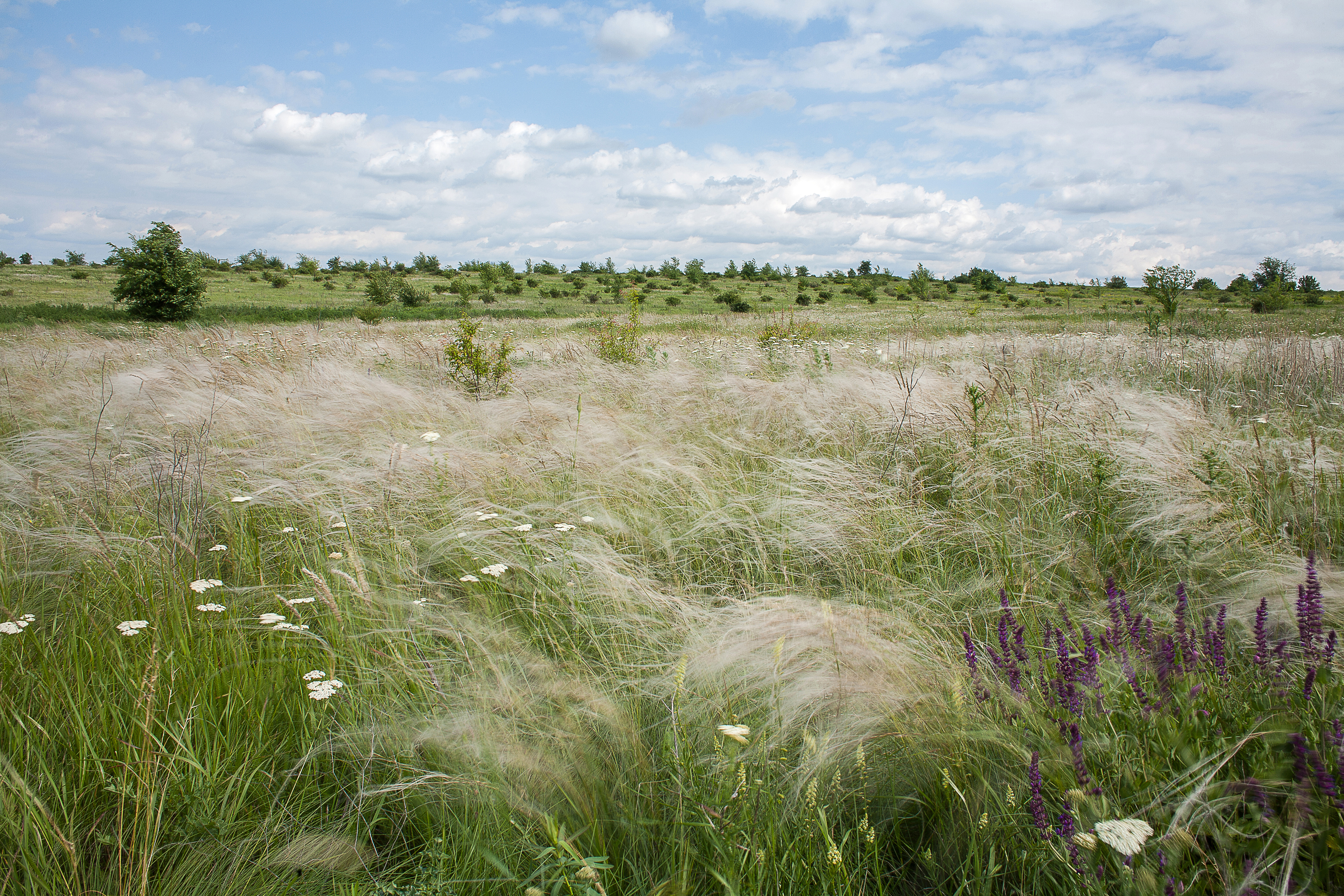
Yelanets Steppe Nature Reserve

== See also ==
- Subdivisions of Ukraine
- Kherson Governorate
- Lysa Hora
