= Pontic Olbia =

Archaeological site of Miletian Black Sea colony

- Ὀλβία Ποντική (Ancient Greek); Ольвія (Ukrainian)
- Olbia
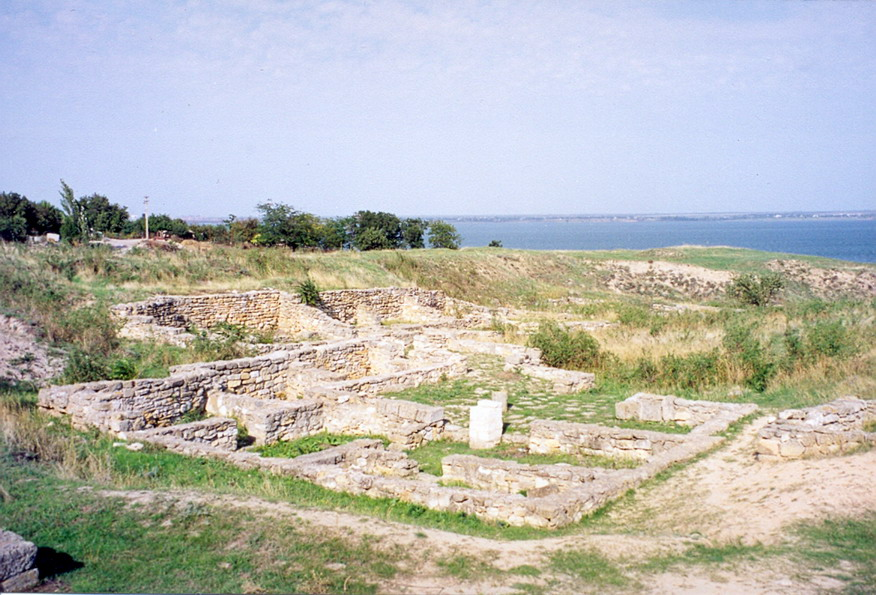
- The ruins of Olbia

- Location within Mykolaiv Oblast
- 46°41′33″N 31°54′13″E
- Type: Settlement
- Periods: Archaic Greek to Roman Imperial
- Cultures: Greek, Roman
- Location: Parutyne, Mykolaiv Oblast, Ukraine

History
- Built: 7th century BC
- Built by: Settlers from Miletus
- Abandoned: 4th century AD

Site notes
- Length: 1 mi (1.6 km)
- Width: 0.5 mi (0.80 km)
- Area: 50 ha (120 acres)
- Excavation dates: 1901–1915, 1924–1926
- Archaeologists: Boris Farmakovsky
- Condition: Ruined

Immovable Monument of National Significance of Ukraine
- Official name: Стародавнє місто Ольвія (Ancient city of Olbia)
- Type: Archaeology
- Reference no.: 140027-Н

Pontic Olbia (Ancient Greek: Ὀλβία Ποντική; Ukrainian: Ольвія, romanized: Olviia) or simply Olbia is an archaeological site of an ancient Greek city on the shore of the Southern Bug estuary (Hypanis or Ὕπανις) in Ukraine, near the village of Parutyne. The archaeological site is protected as the National Historic and Archaeological Reserve. The reserve constitutes a research and science institute of the National Academy of Sciences of Ukraine. In 1938–1993 it was part of the NASU Institute of Archaeology as a department.

The Hellenic city was founded in the 7th century BC by colonists from Miletus. Its harbour was one of the main emporia on the Black Sea for the export of cereals, fish, and slaves to Greece, and for the import of Attic goods to Scythia.

== Layout ==
Olbia and other Greek colonies along the north coast of the Black Sea (Euxine Sea), 8th to 3rd century BCE

The site of the Greek colony covers the area of fifty hectares and its fortifications form an isosceles triangle about a mile long and half a mile wide. The region was also the site of several villages (modern Victorovka and Dneprovskoe) which may have been settled by Greeks.

As for the town itself, the lower town (now largely submerged by the Bug river) was occupied chiefly by the dockyards and the houses of artisans. The upper town was a main residential quarter, composed of square blocks and centered on the agora. The town was ringed by a defensive stone wall with towers. The upper town was also the site of the first settlement on the site in the archaic period. There is evidence that the town itself was laid out over a grid plan from the 6th century – one of the first after the town of Smyrna.

By the later period of settlement, the city also included an acropolis and, from the 6th century BCE, a religious sanctuary. In the early 5th century, a temple to Apollo Delphinios was also built on the site.

== History ==
=== Archaic and Classical periods ===
The Greek colony was highly important commercially and endured for a millennium. The first evidence of Greek settlement at the site comes from Berezan Island where pottery has been found dating from the late 7th century. The name in Greek means "happy" or "rich". It is possible that it had been the site of an earlier native settlement and may even have been a peninsula rather than an island in antiquity. It is now thought that the town of Berezan survived until the 5th century BCE when it was possibly absorbed into the growing Olbian settlement on the mainland.

During the 5th century BCE, the colony was visited by Herodotus, who provides our best description of the city and its inhabitants from antiquity.

It produced distinctive cast bronze money during the 5th century BCE in both the form of circular tokens with Gorgon heads and unique coins in the shape of leaping dolphins. These are unusual considering the struck, round coins common in the Greek world. This form of money is said to have originated from sacrificial tokens used in the Temple of Apollo Delphinios.

M. L. West speculated that early Greek religion, especially the Orphic Mysteries, was heavily influenced by Central Asian shamanistic practices. A significant amount of Orphic graffiti unearthed in Olbia seems to testify that the colony was one major point of contact.

=== Hellenistic and Roman periods ===
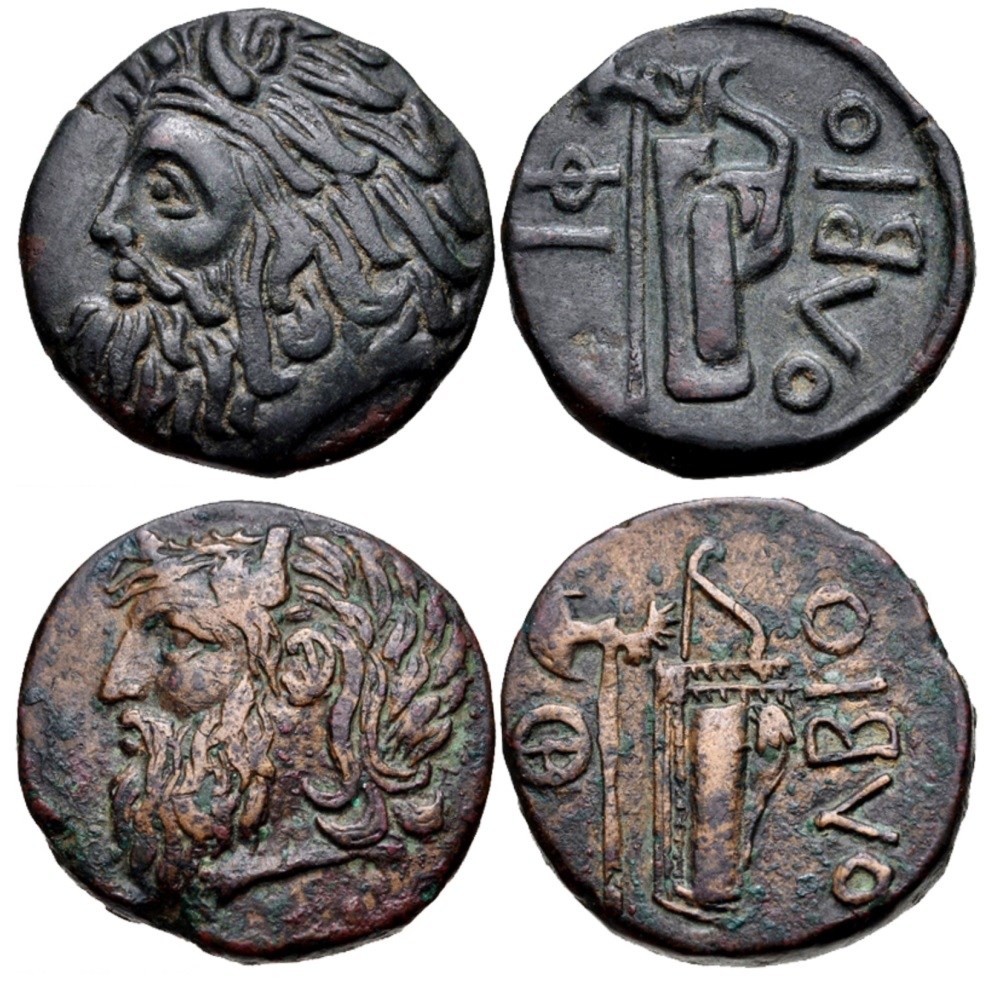
Two coins from Olbia (3rd-1st century BC) depicting the bearded head of the river-god Borysthenes

After the town adopted a democratic constitution in the 4th century BCE, its relations with Miletus were regulated by a treaty, which allowed both states to coordinate their operations against Alexander the Great's general Zopyrion in the 4th century BCE. By the end of the 3rd century, the town declined economically (Note: A board of food commissioners was set up to distribute cereals among the population.) and accepted the overlordship of King Skilurus of Scythia. It flourished under Mithridates Eupator but was sacked by the Getae under Burebista, a catastrophe which brought Olbia's economic prominence to an abrupt end.

Having lost two-thirds of its settled area, Olbia was restored by the Romans, albeit on a small scale and probably with a largely barbarian population. Dio of Prusa visited the town and described it in his Borysthenic Discourse (the town was often called Borysthenes, after the river).

The settlement, incorporated into the Roman province of Lower Moesia, was eventually abandoned in the 4th century CE, when it was burnt at least twice in the course of the Gothic Wars.

== Excavation ==
Distinctive Olbian "Dolphin" coin, circa 5th–4th century BC

Olbian dolphin coins – early forms of money shaped like dolphins, cast in bronze and used in Olbia Pontica. Four specimens, shown from both sides.

The site of Olbia, designated an archaeological reservation, is situated near the village of Parutyne in Mykolaiv Raion. Before 1902, the site was owned by the Counts Musin-Pushkins, who did not allow any excavations on their estate. Professional excavations were conducted under Boris Farmakovsky from 1901 to 1915 and from 1924 to 1926. As the site was never reoccupied, archaeological finds (particularly inscriptions and sculpture) proved rich. Today archaeologists are under pressure to explore the site, which is being eroded by the Black Sea. At 2016 started in Olbia excavations of the Polish Archaeological Mission "Olbia" of the National Museum in Warsaw headed by Alfred Twardecki. Many of the more notable finds from the period are visible in the Hermitage Museum in Saint Petersburg, Russia.

Notable finds from the town include an archaic Greek house in a good state of preservation from the area of the later acropolis and a private letter (written on a lead tablet) dating to around 500 BCE, complaining about an attempt to claim a slave.

== See also ==
- List of ancient Greek cities
