= Aktove canyon =

Canyon in Ukraine

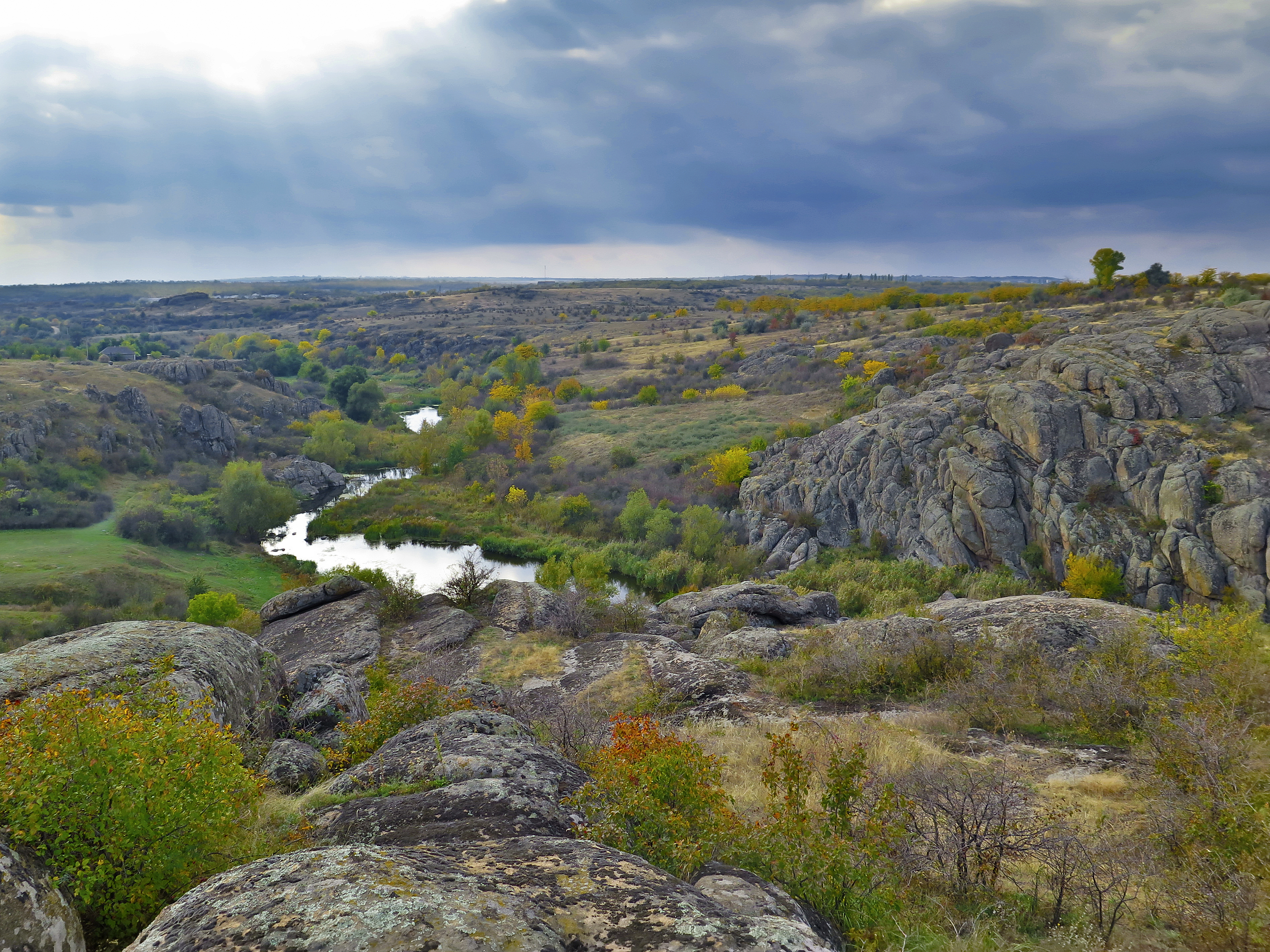

- Location within Mykolaiv Oblast Location within Ukraine

Naming
- Native name: Актівський канйон (Ukrainian)

Geography
- State: Ukraine
- Region: Mykolaiv Oblast
- Coordinates: 47.711°N 31.476°E
- Interactive map of Aktove canyon

Aktove Canyon is a canyon near the Aktove village, on the Mertvovod river in the Voznesensk Raion of Mykolaiv Oblast of Ukraine. It is a part of the regional landscape park Granite-steppe lands of Buh. It is also a well-known place of pilgrimage. In the past it was a separate reserve "Aktove".

Aktove Canyon consists of ancient weathered granite, cut by Mertvovid river on the depth of more than 50 meters. Area of the canyon outreaches 250 hectares. Being a unique complex of granite rocks, boulders and water/steppe ecosystems, canyon is located on one of the oldest parts of Eurasian land.

The canyon is a part of the Bug Gard National Nature Park and the regional land park Granite-steppe lands of Buh.

== Gallery ==
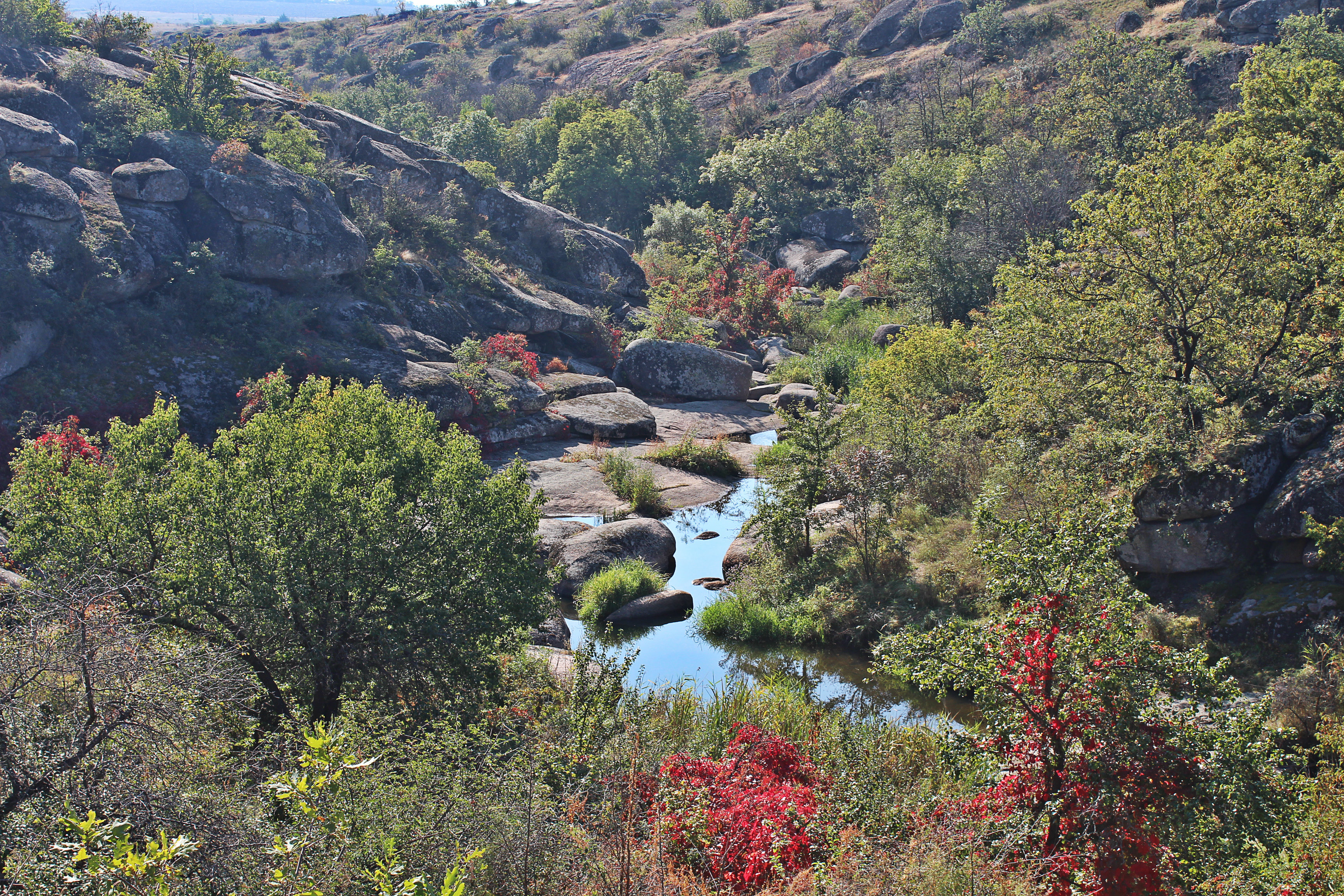
Aktove Canyon

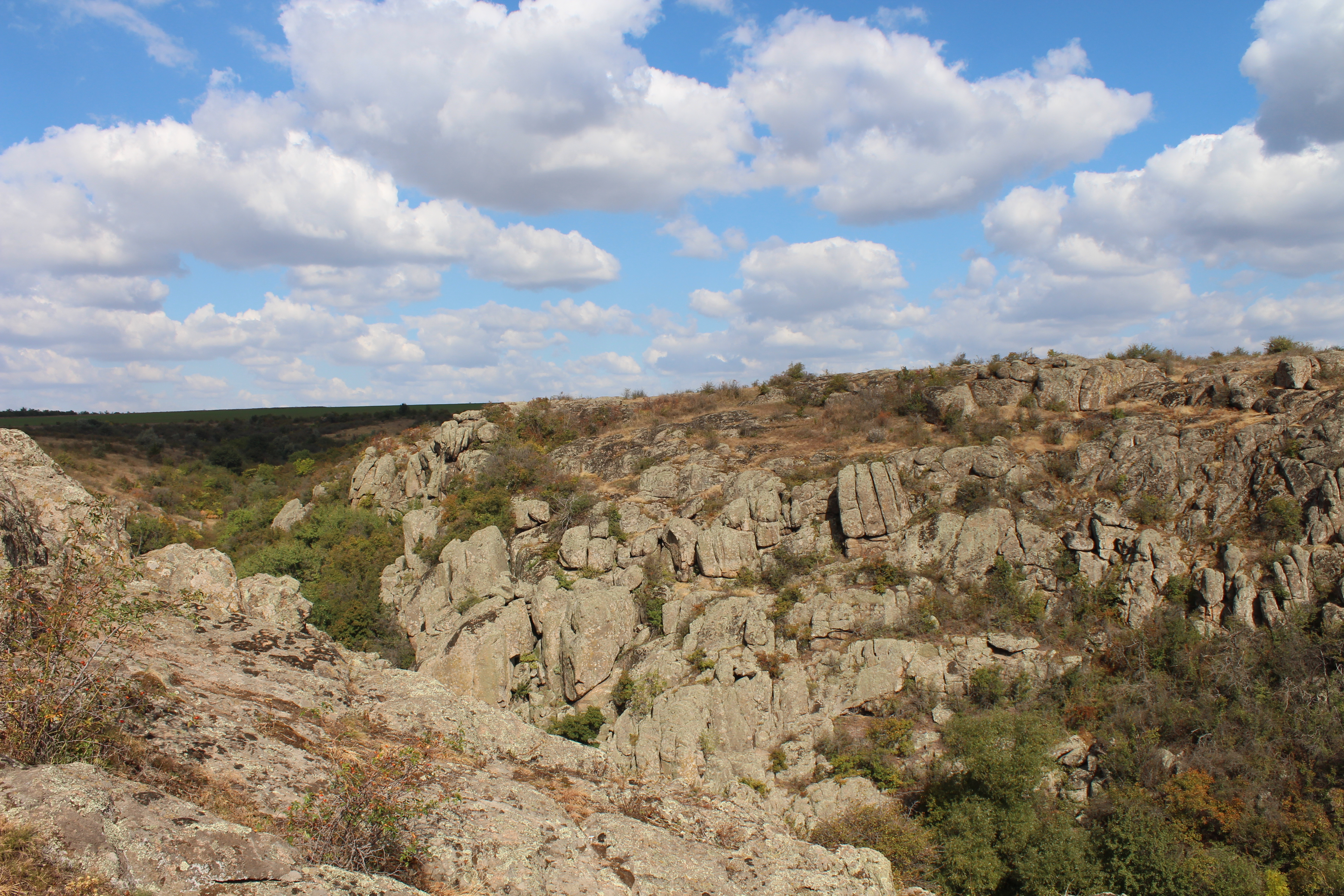
Aktove Canyon, Trikraty

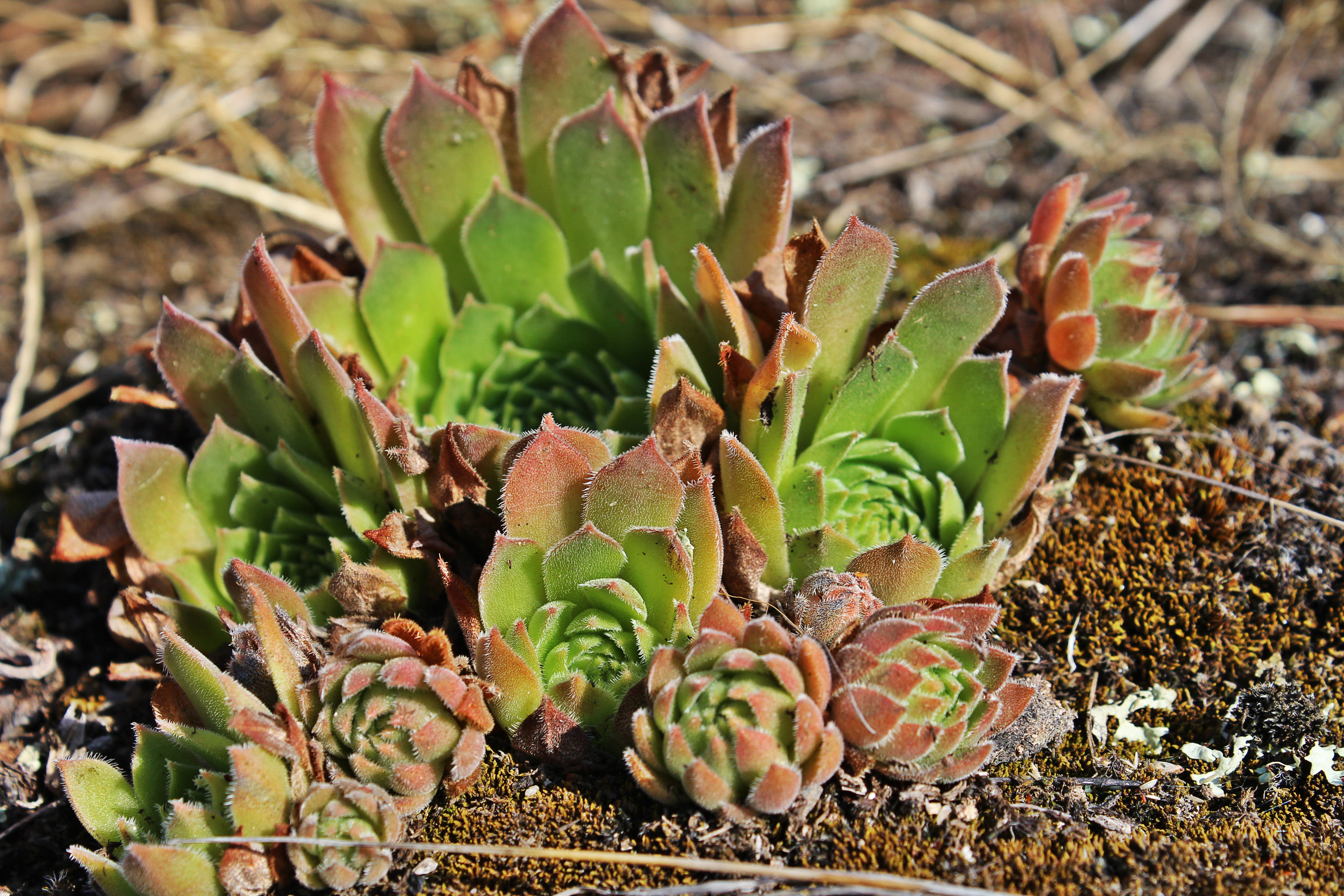
Flora in Aktove Canyon

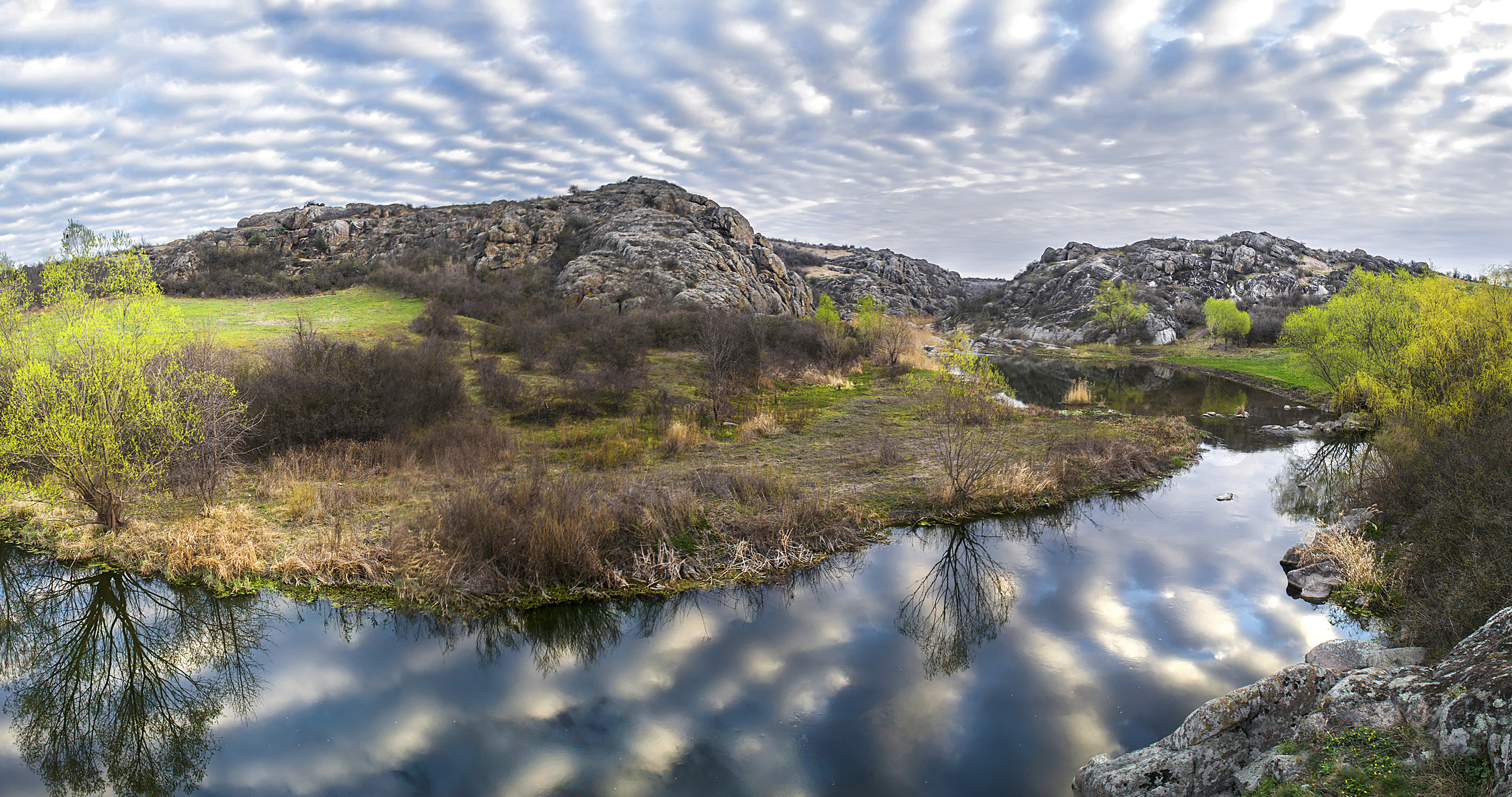
Canyon in 2014

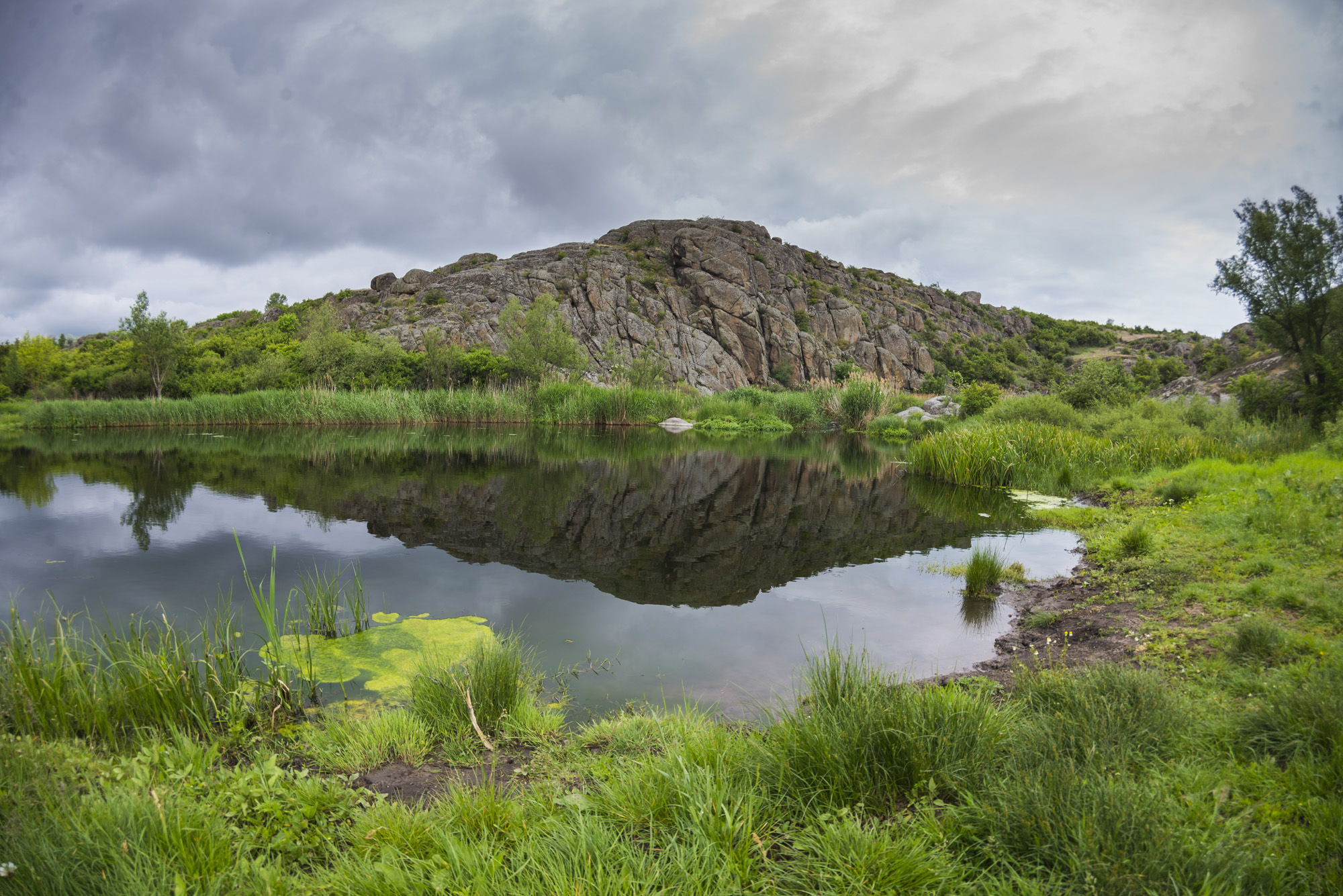
Canyon in 2017

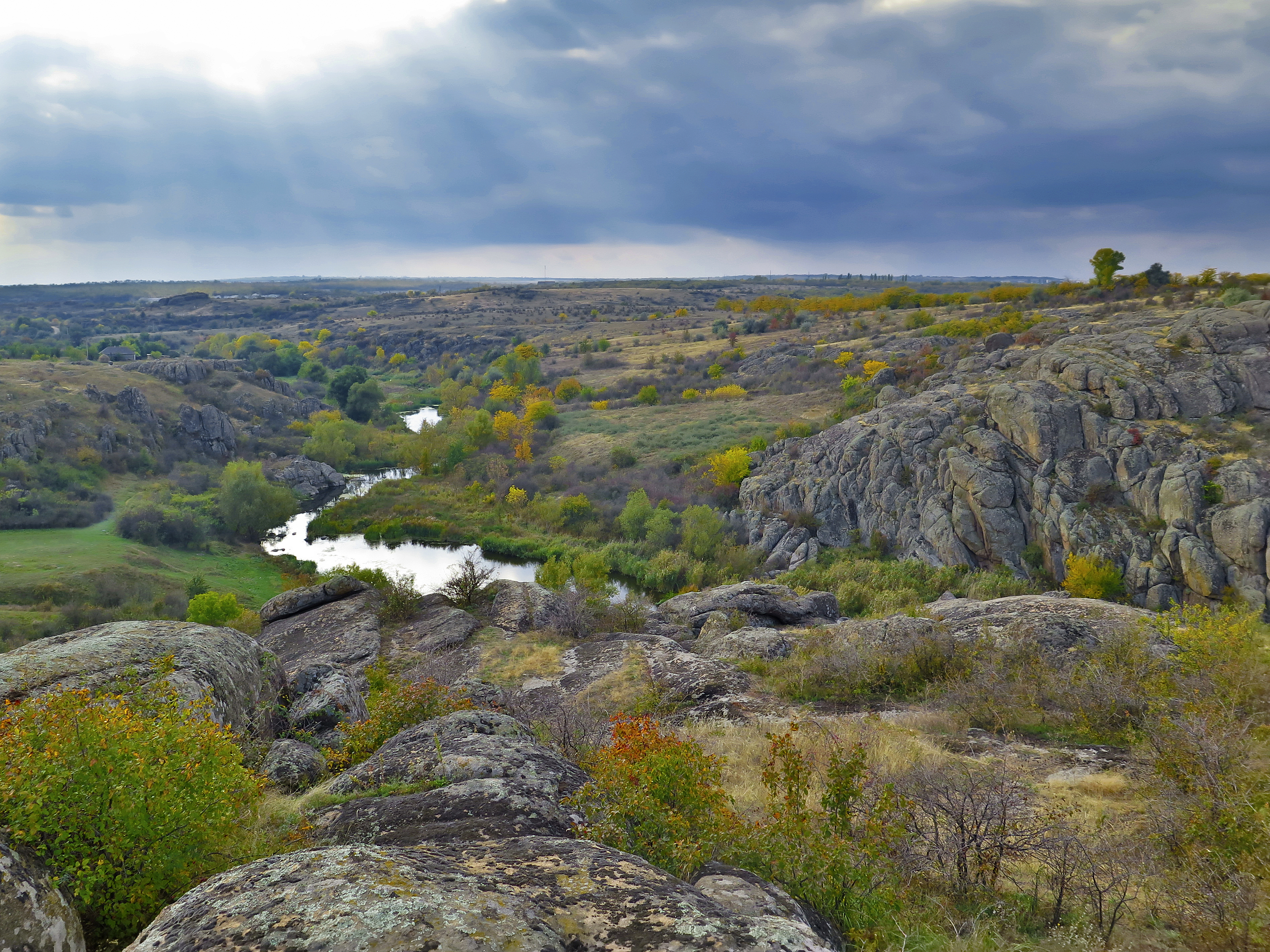
Canyon in Autumn 2016
