= Bug Gard National Nature Park =

National nature park in Mykolaiv Oblast, Ukraine

- Ukrainian: Національний природний парк «Бузький Гард»
- IUCN category II (national park)
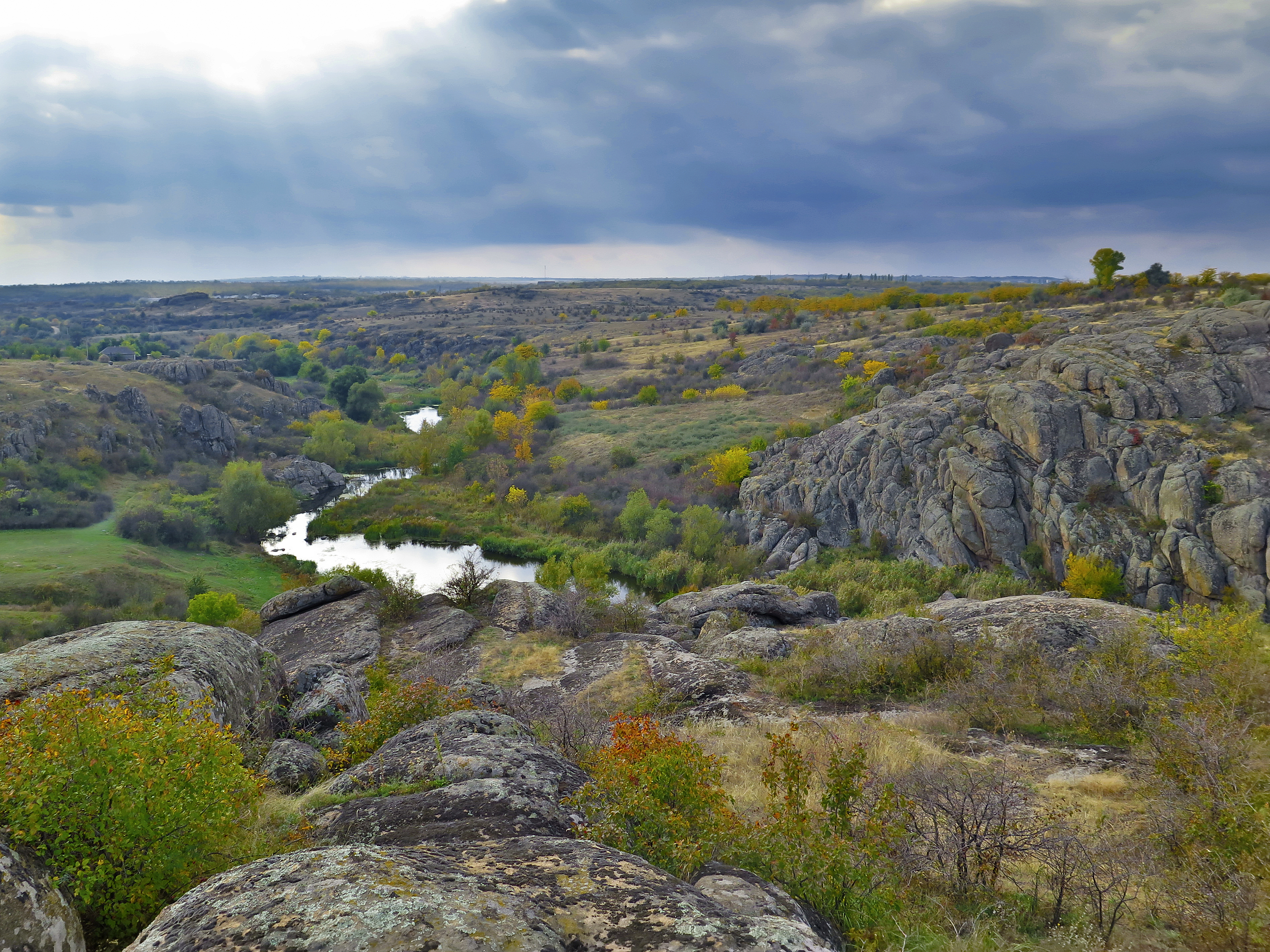
- Aktove Canyon, Bug Gard National Nature Park

- Location within Ukraine
- Location: Mykolaiv Oblast, Ukraine
- Nearest city: Pervomaisk, Pivdennoukrainsk
- Coordinates: 48.03972°N 30.94667°E
- Area: 6,138 hectares (15,167 acres; 61 km^{2}; 24 sq mi)
- Established: 2009
- Governing body: Ministry of Ecology and Natural Resources (Ukraine)
- Website: http://buzkiy-gard.org/

The Bug Gard National Nature Park (Ukrainian: Національний природний парк «Бузький Гард», romanized: Buz'kyj Hard) covers an area along the Southern Bug River in south-central Ukraine. At this point, the Southern Bug River cuts through the southern edge of the Ukrainian Shield (a block of Archean basement rock). The national park is therefore a canyon that transitions the river from the upland plateau to the steppe region. The word 'gard' in the name refers to a type of fishing structure used in the Cossack era. The park is spread in sections over Voznesensk and Pervomaisk raions of Mykolaiv Oblast. The major portions are about 140 km upstream from the estuary of the Southern Bug at the Black Sea.

== History ==
The information about the unique natural landscape of the current NNP was known far beyond the borders of Ukraine as early as 1920. In 1929, the journal “Kraevedenie” (Leningrad) published the List of sites and individual objects of nature in need of protection, which was kept at that time in the file of the Commission for the Protection of Nature, Monuments of Art, Life and Antiquity at the Leningrad Group of the Central Bureau of Local Lore. An extract for all units of the then USSR was prepared for printing by A. P. Vasylkivsky. The information about the tract is also included in the article in the list of 250 most important natural objects in need of protection in the USSR.

== Topography ==
The park coincides with the "Granite-steppe lands of Buh" Regional Landscape Park, a designation which has high status as an area of scenic importance, but which does not provide as strong a set of protections as the National Park status. The park, which is a collection of nearby tracts, is mostly centered on the Southern Bug River where the river transitions from the uplands to the steppe. The drop occurs in a relatively narrow canyon with granite outcrops and numerous ledges, rapids, and islands.

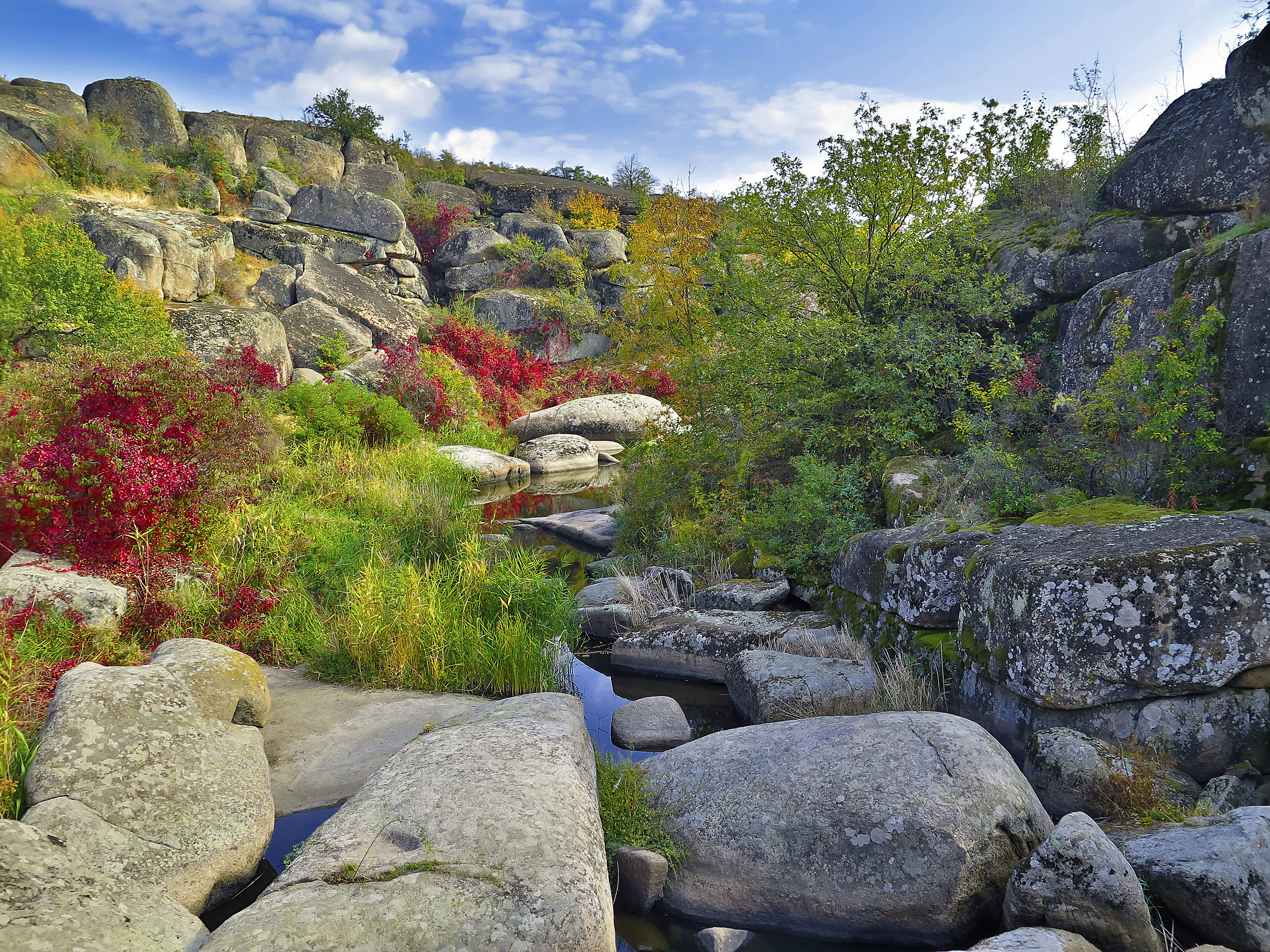
Arbuzynka Canyon in fall

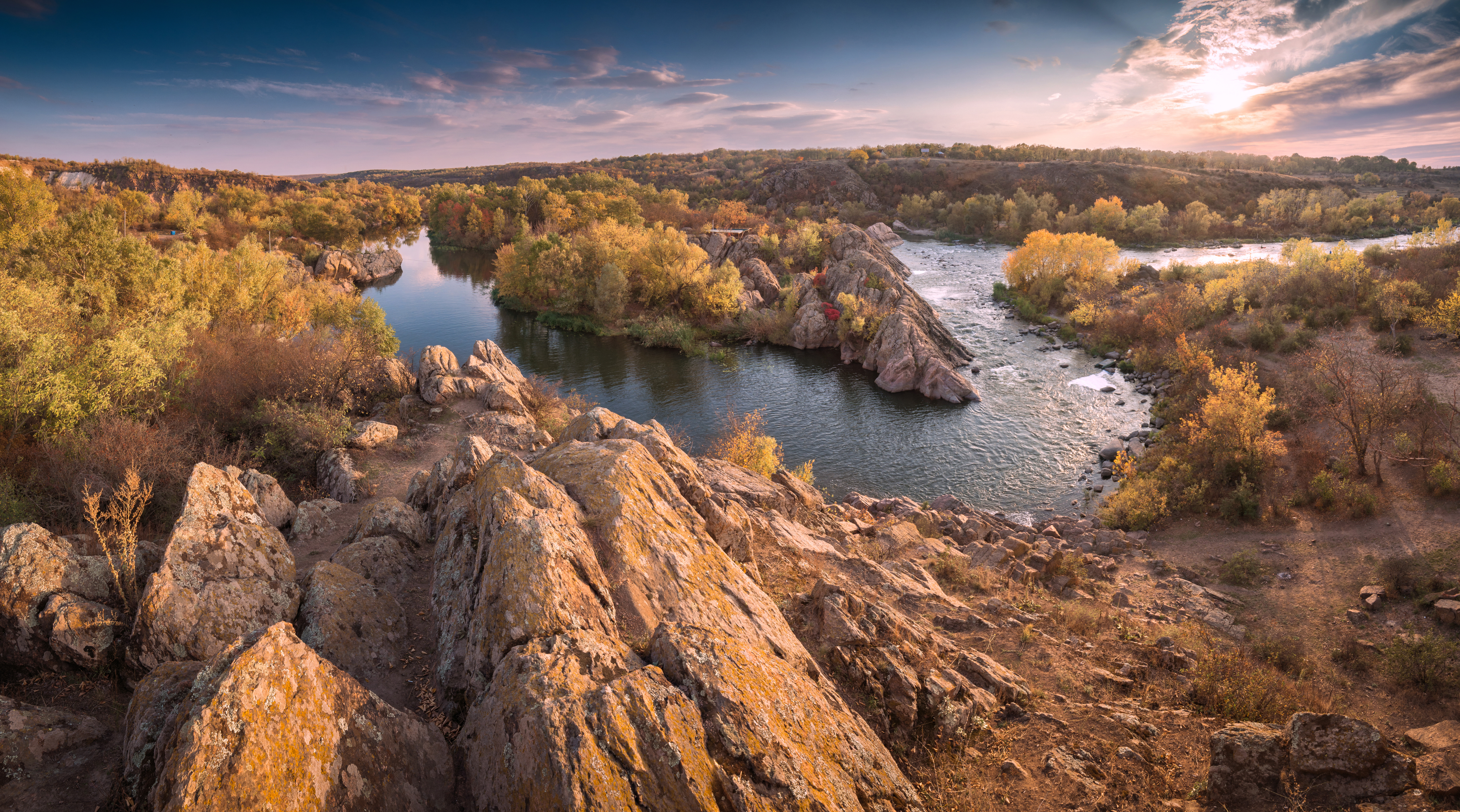
Panorama

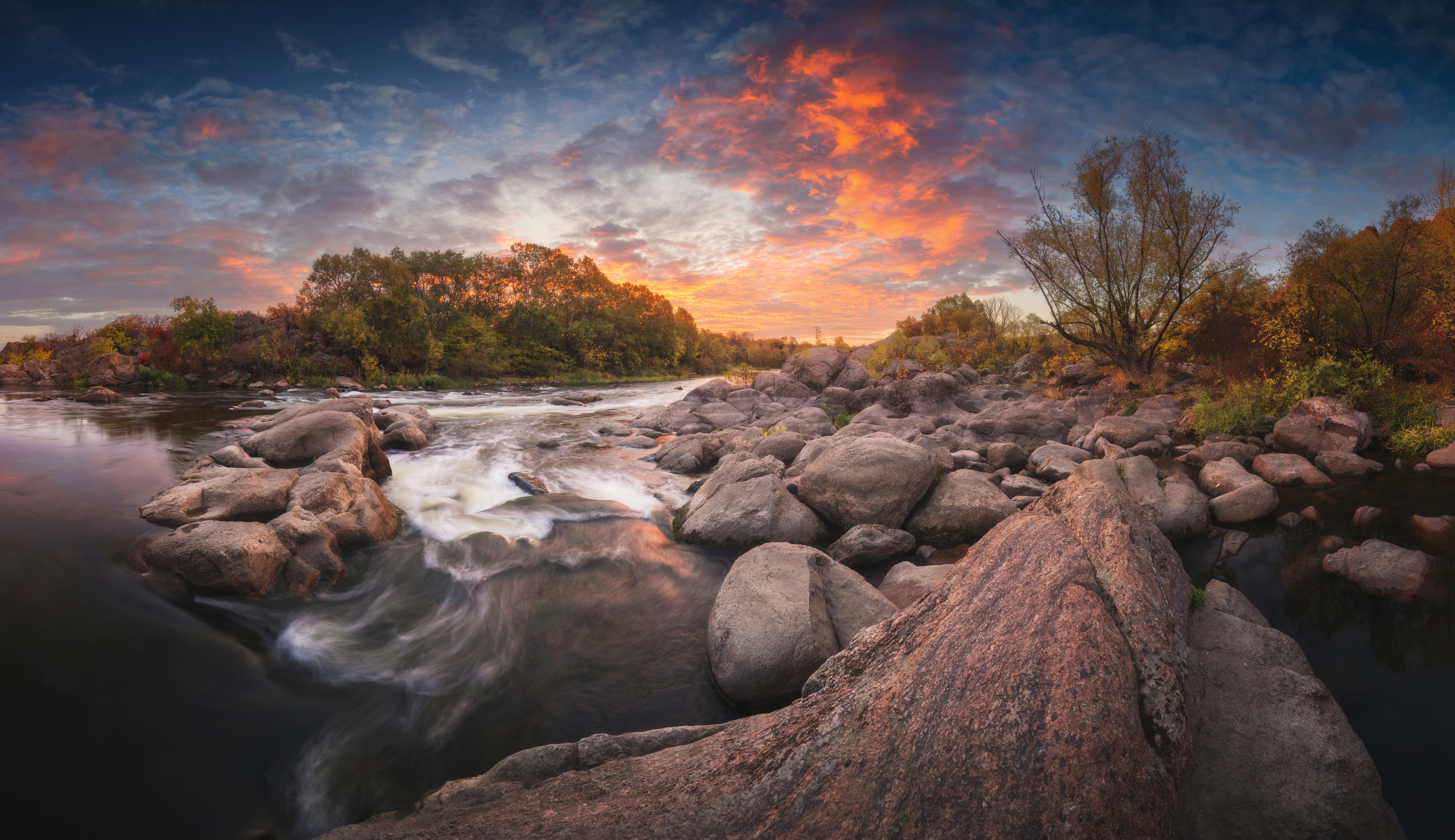
Panorama

== Ecoregion and climate ==
Bug Gard is located towards the western edge of the Pontic–Caspian steppe ecoregion. The climate classified as Humid continental climate, warm summer (Köppen climate classification (Dfb)). This climate is characterized by large swings in temperature, both diurnally and seasonally, with mild summers and cold, snowy winters. Precipitation averages 450 – 500 mm/year.

== Flora and fauna ==
Biodiversity is high as the park stands at a transition point between upland forest and lowland steppe. Scientists on the park have recorded 900 species of plants, and 300 species of vertebrates. The upper plateau is partially forested, the fall zone features rocky terrain of brush and sedges transitioning to steppe vegetation.

== Public use ==
Most visitors to the park arrive as part of sponsored tour groups, or those with lodging arrangements. Individuals wishing to visit are to expected to contact the administrative offices in advance to obtain information on park rules. The park offers public ecotrails and tours.

== See also ==
- National Parks of Ukraine
