= Parutyne =

Village in Mykolaiv Oblast, Ukraine

Parutyne Парутине
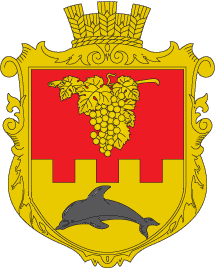
- Coat of arms
- Interactive map of Parutyne
- Location within Ukraine Location within Mykolaiv Oblast
- Coordinates: 46°42′23″N 31°53′48″E
- Country: Ukraine
- Oblast: Mykolaiv Oblast
- Raion: Mykolaiv Raion
- Hromada: Kutsurub rural hromada
- Founded: 1789

Area
  - Total: 2.17 km^{2} (0.84 sq mi)
- Elevation: 24 m (79 ft)

Population
  - Total: 1,996
  - Density: 919.82/km^{2} (2,382.3/sq mi)
- Time zone: UTC+2 (EET)
  - Summer (DST): UTC+3 (EEST)
- Postal code: 57540
- Area code: +380 5154

Parutyne (Ukrainian: Парутине) is a village of Mykolaiv Raion, Mykolaiv Oblast, in Southern Ukraine.

The ruins of the Ancient Greek polis of Olbia are located on territory of the village.

The settlement was founded in 1789 at Parutyne balka (gulch) near location known as "Sto Mohyl" (Hundred of Graves) by former Nekrasov Cossacks–Lipovans who resettled here from Cioburciu (Chobruchi).

Following the Siege of Ochakov during the 1787–1792 Russo-Turkish War, in 1792 over 12,000 desiatinas (~32.5 thousands of acres) of land with Parutyne at the right bank of Boh liman (Southern Bug estuary) near Ochakiv were given by Catherine the Great to "Malorossian" landowner and son of former Cossack Hetmanate official, Count Illia Bezborodko.

After that Nekrassov Cossacks left Parutyne and returned to Dniester banks, while Bezborodko resettled the area with own serfs primarily from Chernigov Governorate (former Cossack Hetmanate). The settlement was renamed as Ilinske. During the 1795 revision in Ilyinske lived 324 males. At first the village belonged to Kherson uezd of Novorossiysk Governorate, and since 1827 to Odessa uezd of Kherson Governorate. In 1858 Ilyinske is mentioned in historical sources as a town (mistechko) which accounted for over 100 households with 864 serfs.
