= Borysthenes =

Ancient Greek river and river god

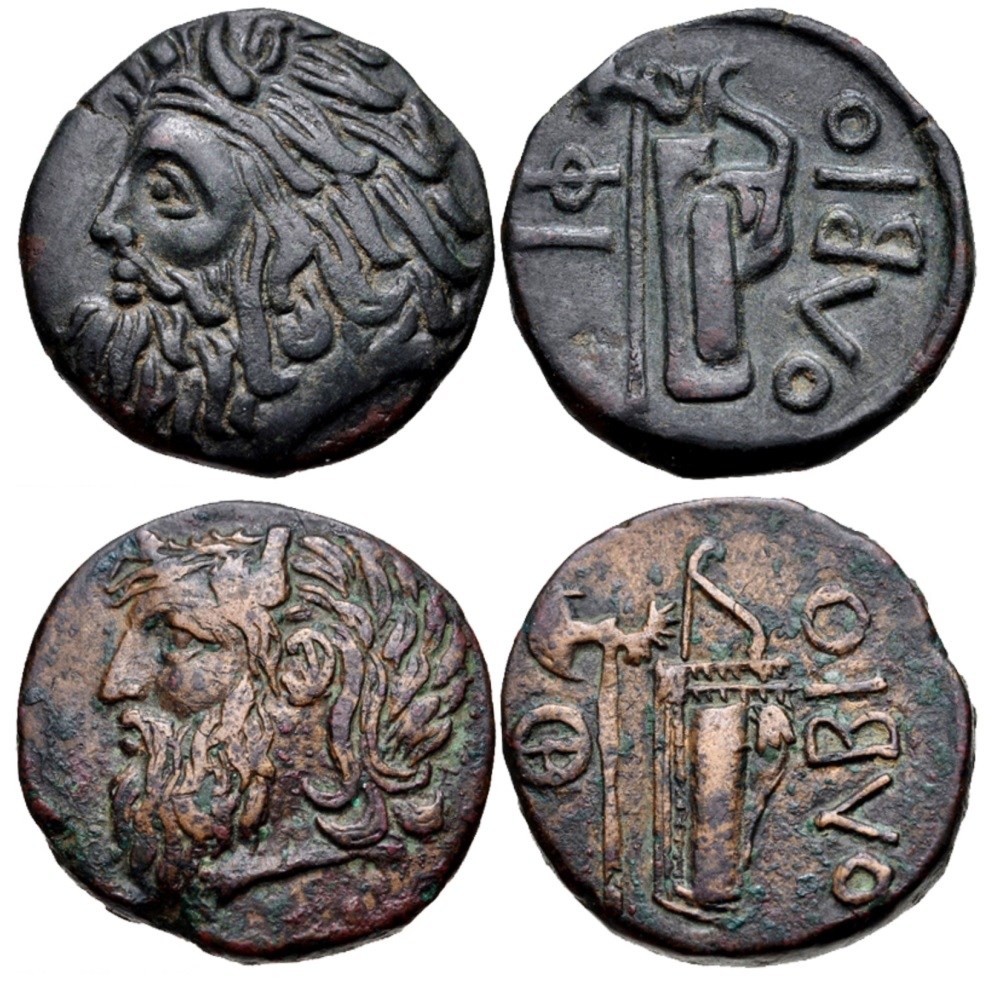
Two coins from Pontic Olbia (3rd-1st century BC) depicting the bearded head of the river-god Borysthenes

Borysthenes (English pronunciation: /bə'rɪsθəniːz/; Ancient Greek: Βορυσθένης, romanized: Borysthénēs) is a geographical name from classical antiquity. The term usually refers to the Dnieper River and its eponymous river god, but also seems to have been an alternative name for Pontic Olbia, a town situated near the mouth of the same river on the Black Sea coast, or the earlier settlement on Berezan Island.

== History ==
The Greek historian Herodotus describes both the river and the town in some detail in the fourth book of his Histories:

The Borysthenes, the second largest of the Scythian rivers, is, in my opinion, the most valuable and productive not only of the rivers in this part of the world, but anywhere else, with the sole exception of the River Nile...It provides the finest and most abundant pasture, by far the richest supply of the best sorts of fish and the most excellent water for drinking - clear and bright... no better crops grow anywhere than along its banks, and where grain is not sown the grass is the most luxuriant in the world. (IV.53)

This is the name that Herodotus in his Histories chooses to talk about Olbia. Supposedly, it was originally the name of another settlement located on Berezan island which is located at the mouth of the Dnipro and in the vicinity of Olbia.

In Greek mythology, Borysthenes fathered a nymph daughter Borysthenis, and a son Thoas, who became a king of the Taurians.

The Borysthenes is mentioned numerous times in The History of the Decline and Fall of the Roman Empire by Edward Gibbon. It was used as a route to the Black Sea by, among others, the Goths.

The Roman emperor Hadrian (A.D. 76–138) wrote an epitaph to his prized horse "Borysthenes" upon the latter's death; the epitaph survives.
