= Berezan Island =

Island in Mykolaiv Raion, Mykolaiv Oblast, Ukraine

Berezan
Native name: Березань
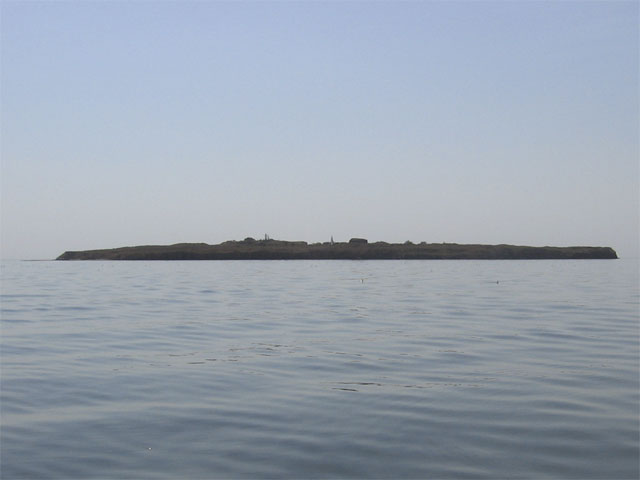
- Berezan Island as seen from a distance.

- Location within Mykolaiv Oblast
- Interactive map of Berezan

Geography
- Location: Black Sea
- Coordinates: 46°36′N 31°24.6′E
- Total islands: 1
- Area: 0.24 km^{2} (0.093 sq mi)
- Length: 0.9 km (0.56 mi)
- Width: 0.4 km (0.25 mi)

Administration
- Ukraine
- Region: Mykolaiv Oblast
- District: Mykolaiv Raion
- Administered by: Olbia Reserve

Demographics
- Population: uninhabited (2001)

The Berezan (Note: Ukrainian: Березань; Ancient Greek: Borysthenes; former Turkish: Pirezin) island is situated in the Black Sea at the entrance of the Dnieper-Bug Estuary, Mykolaiv Raion, Mykolaiv Oblast, Ukraine. Located 8 kilometers from the city of Ochakiv and 4 kilometers from the resort village of Rybakivka. It is often confused with the artificial island of Pervomaisky that is located within Dnieper-Bug Estuary. The Berezan island measures approximately 900 metres in length by 320 metres in width, the height of the northern part is 3-6 metres, the southern part is 21 metres. It is separated from the mainland (to which it may have been connected long ago) by about a mile and a half of shallow water. Berezan is an integral part of the historical and archaeological reserve of the National Academy of Sciences of Ukraine "Olbia". The island is uninhabited. In the summer, archaeological expeditions of the IA NASU and the State Hermitage Museum used to work here. The archaeological site is regularly destroyed as a result of unauthorized excavations.

== History ==
Berezan was home to one of the earliest Greek colonies (possibly known as Borysthenes, after the Greek name of the Dnieper) in the northern Black Sea region. The island was first settled in the mid-7th century B.C. and was largely abandoned by the end of the 5th century B.C., when Olbia became the dominant colony in the region. In the 5th century BC, Herodotus visited it to gather information about the northern course of the eponymous river. The colony thrived on wheat trade with the Scythian hinterland.

In the Middle Ages, the island was of high military importance because it commanded the mouth of the Dnieper. During the period of Kievan Rus’ there was an important station on the trade route from the Varangians to the Greeks. It was there that Varangians first came into contact with the Greeks.

Greek colonies in the north coast of the Black Sea (Euxine Sea), 8th to 3rd century BCE. Borysthenes is shown to be located on the Berezan island (near Olbia)

The only Runic inscription in Southern Ukraine, the Berezan' Runestone, was found on the island in 1905, now on exhibit in the Odesa Historical Museum. The inscription seems to have been part of a gravestone over the grave of a Varangian merchant from Gotland. The text reads: "Grani made this vault in memory of Karl, his partner."

The control of the estuary (known in East Slavic sources as Beloberezhye, or White Shores) was disputed between Kievan Rus and Byzantium during the multiple Rus'–Byzantine Wars. At last the Rus'–Byzantine Treaty of 944 stipulated that the Rus' could use the island in the summertime, without establishing winter camps in the estuary or oppressing the citizens of Chersonesos fishing off shore. Nevertheless, at the conclusion of Sviatoslav I's war against Byzantium, this overking of Rus was allowed to evacuate his forces from Dorostolon to Beloberezhye, where his troops spent the hungry winter of 971/972.

During the 14th and 15th centuries, when the entire Bug-Dniester interfluve was part of the Grand Duchy of Lithuania, there is little information about the island, and already at the turn of the 15th and 16th centuries the island was ruled by the Crimean Khanate, but was not inhabited. At the same time, the Zaporozhian Cossacks knew about the island and used it for anchorage of ships and rest during numerous sea voyages.

Zaporozhian Cossacks revived Berezan as a fort during their campaigns against the Crimean Tatars and the Ottoman Empire in the 16th and 17th centuries. After the fall of neighbouring Ochakov to the Russians, the island was incorporated with the remainder of New Russia into the Russian Empire.

The site of the Greek colony and its necropolis have been periodically excavated since the 19th century; even though the site has suffered from erosion (and the tombs also from looting), the digs produced rich findings (archaic ceramics, inscriptions, etc.).

In March 1906, Pyotr Schmidt was executed on Berezan.

During World War II, the island became part of the Romanian Transnistria Governorate, along with all of the raion and city of Ochakiv.

In 2013, archaeologists found an encolpion cross on the island, dating from the late 11th - early 12th centuries, which is evidence of the existence of a settlement here, presumably designed to protect the trade route from the Varangians to the Greeks.

In 2023, the Ukrainian government constructed an underground munitions supply depot on the island in response to the Russian invasion amid concerns of bombing by the Russian air force.

== Gallery ==
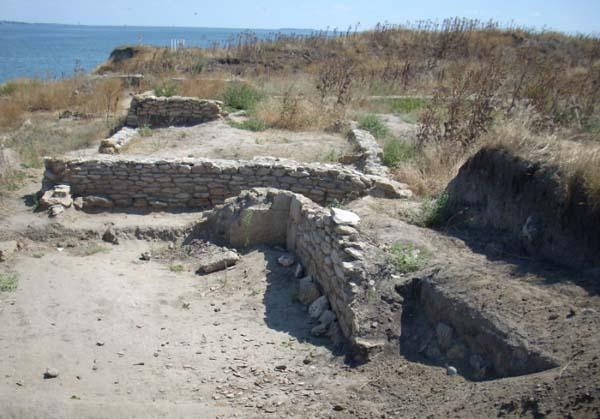
Archaeological excavations of Borysthenida on the island

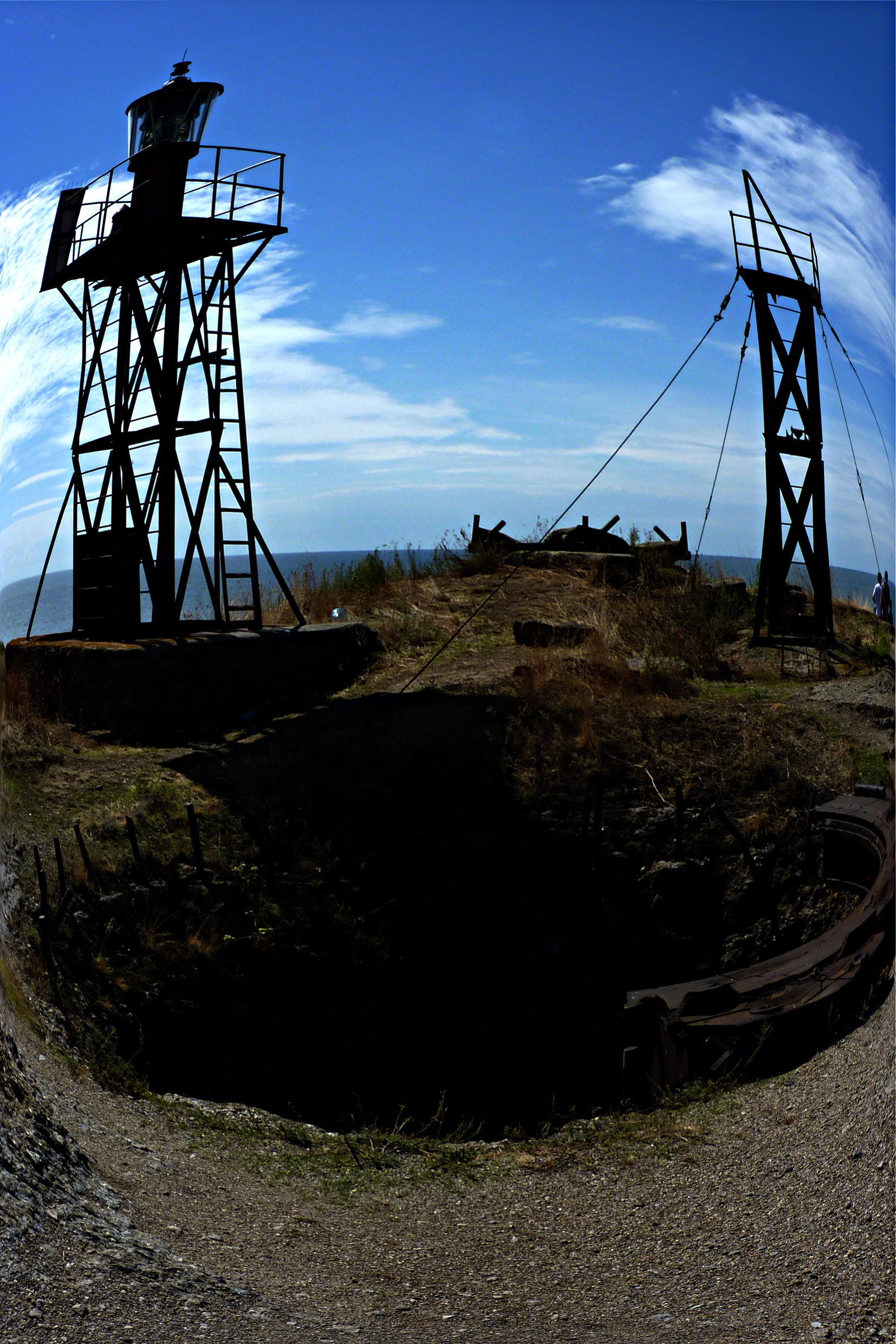
Abandoned lighthouses

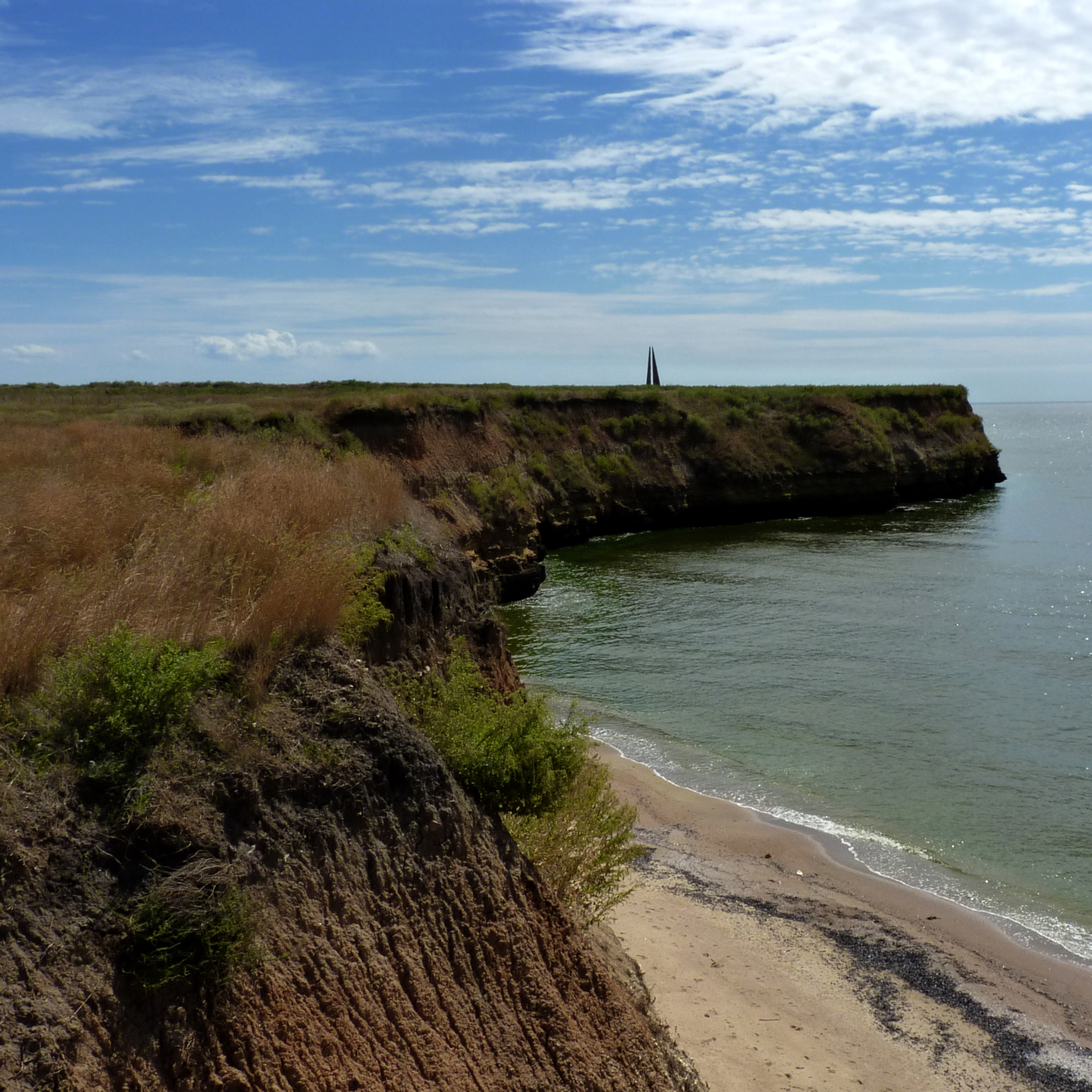
Obelisk to commemorate Lieutenant Schmidt

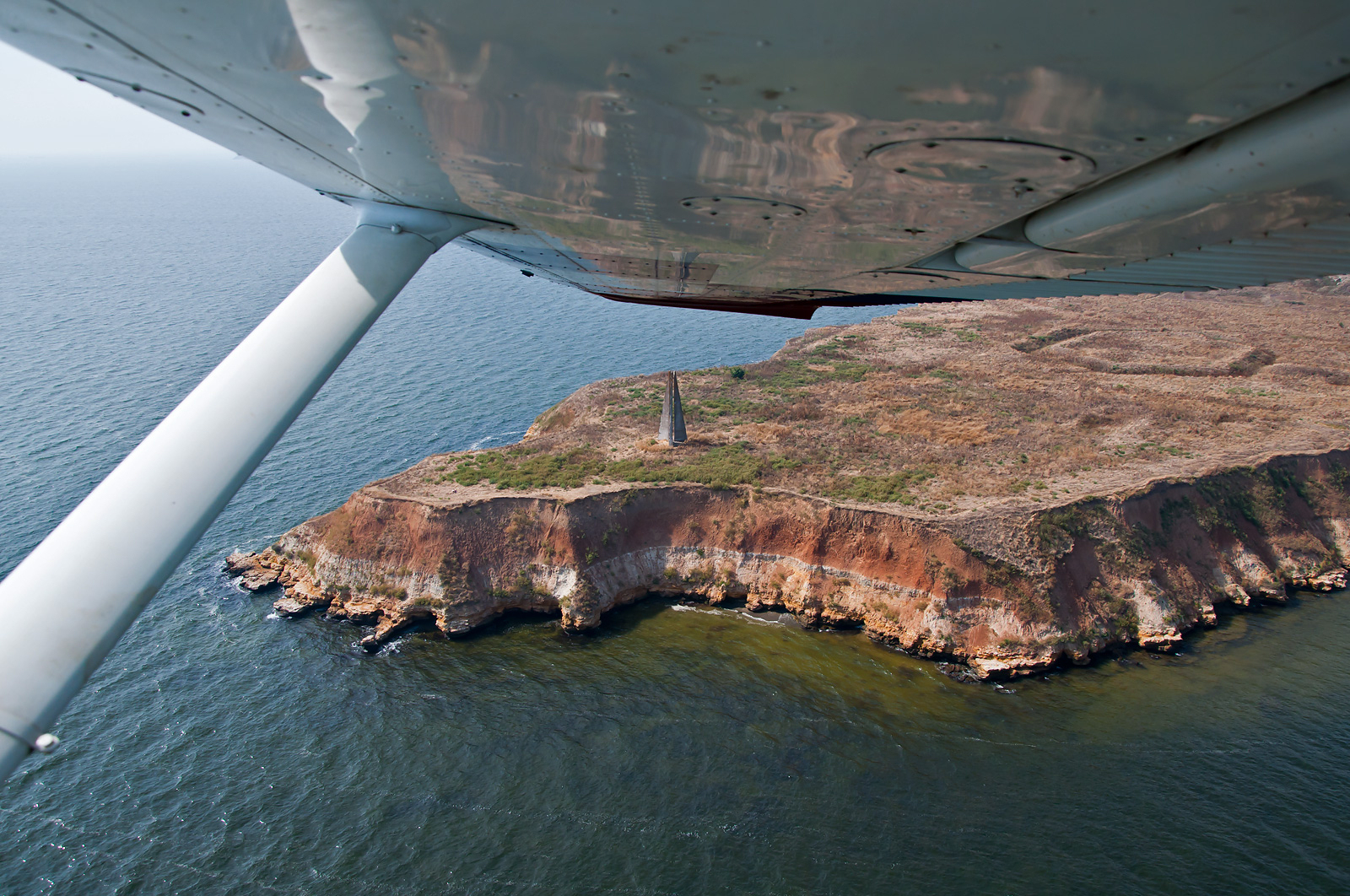
Flying over Berezan Island in a Cessna 150L

== See also ==
- Khortytsia Island
- Snake Island
- List of islands of Ukraine
