= Boris Farmakovsky =

Russian archaeologist

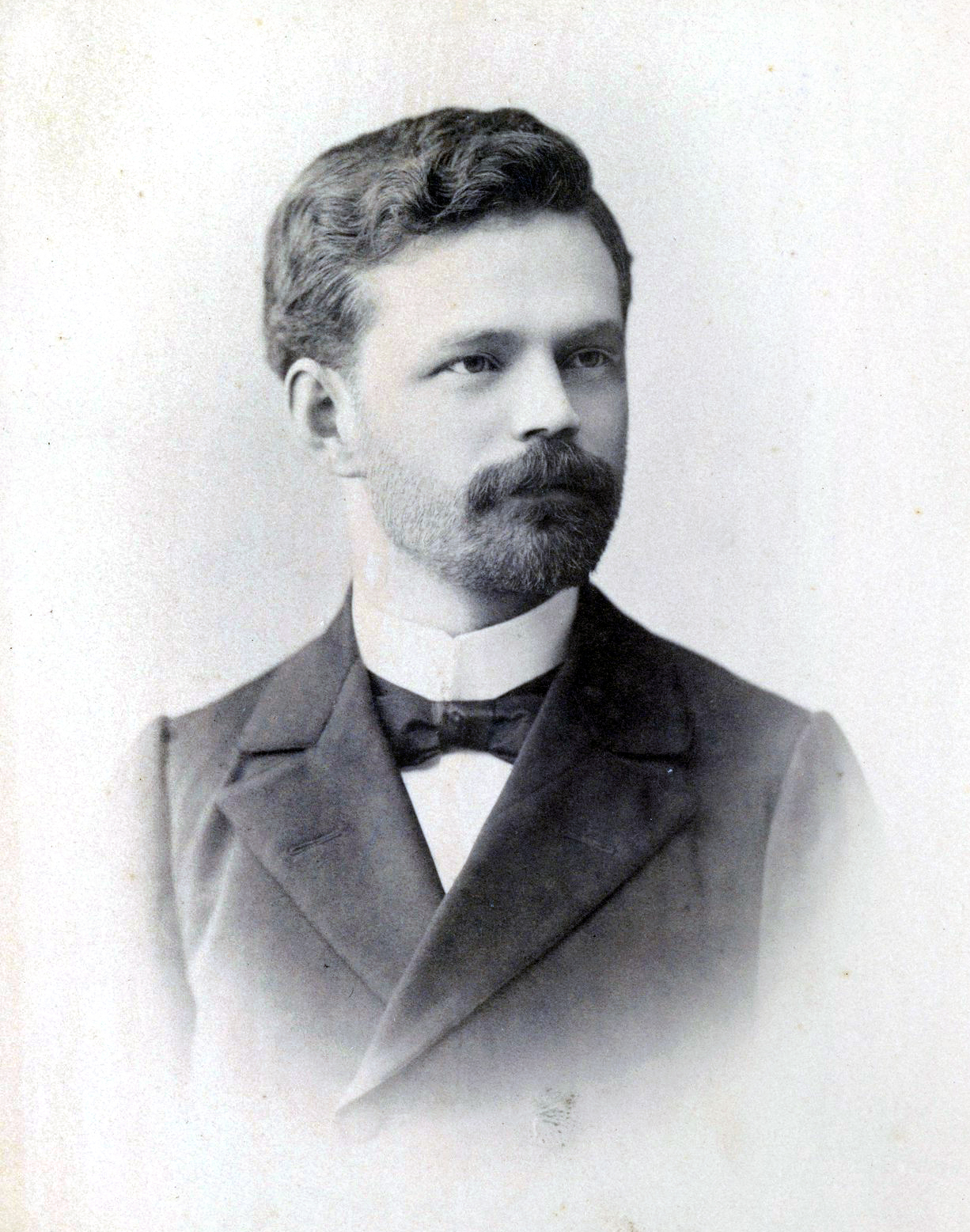

Boris Vladimirovich Farmakovsky (Russian: Борис Владимирович Фармаковский; 12 February 1870, Vyatka — 29 July 1928, Pargolovo, Leningrad Oblast) was a Russian archaeologist, who began professional excavations of the ancient Greek colony of Olbia in Ukraine.

Farmakovsly served on many archeological commissions and was the curator of antiquities at the Hermitage from 1924-1928. His excavations at Olbia in 1896, 1901–1915, 1924-1926 provided significant insights into the ancient history of South Ukraine.
