= Southern Bug =

River in Ukraine

Coordinates: 46°59′N 31°58′E

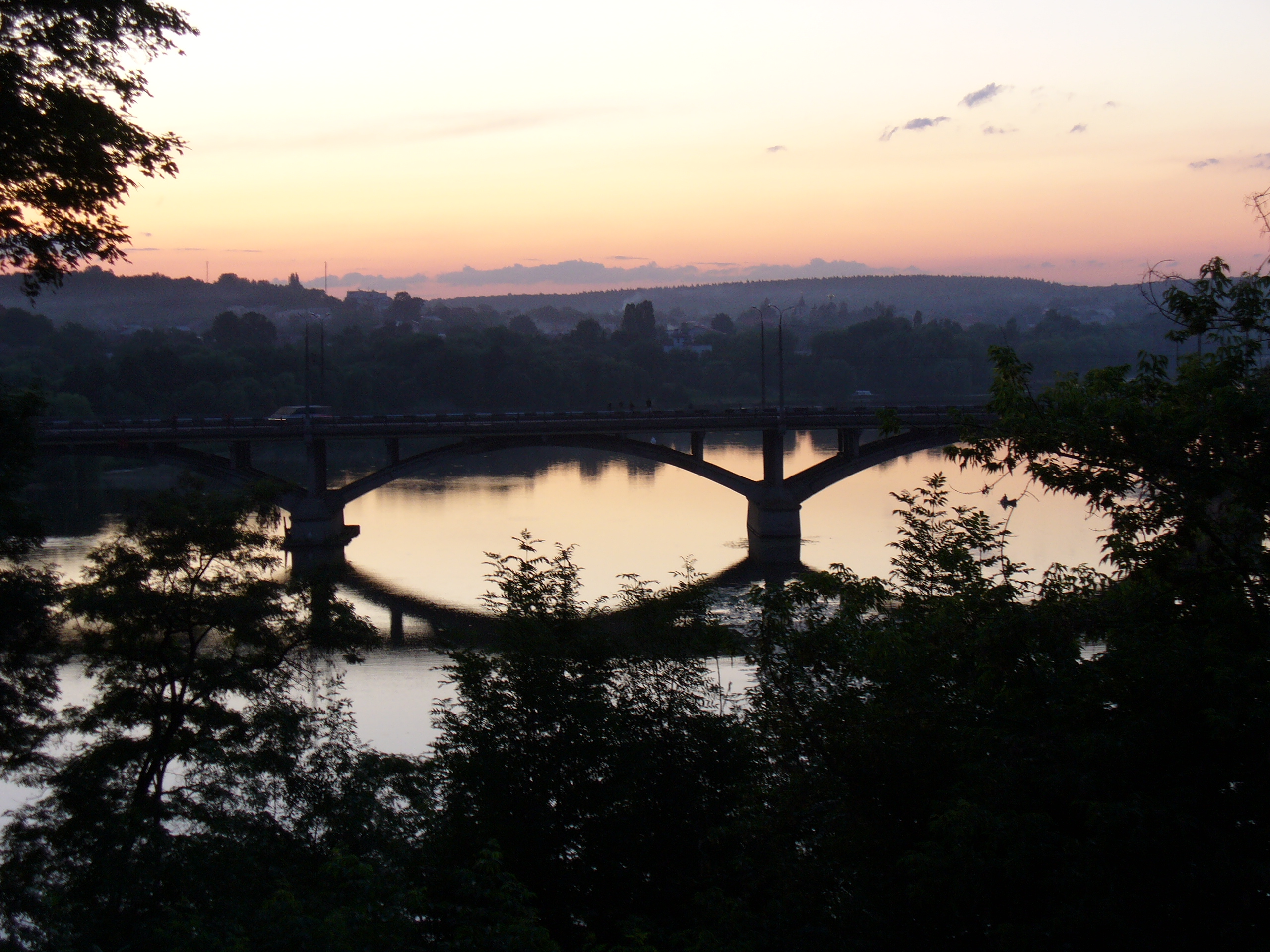
- The Southern Bug in the vicinity of Vinnytsia, Ukraine

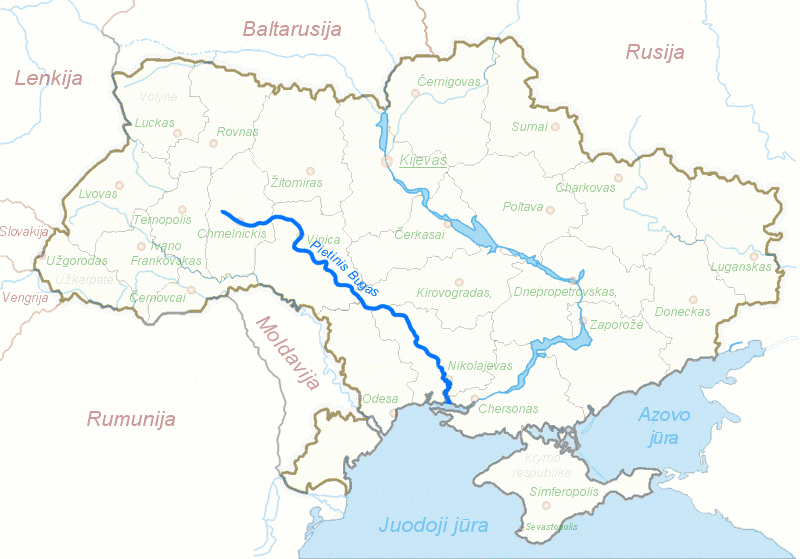
- Southern Bug through Ukraine
- Etymology: the Slavic hydronym *bugъ/*buga
- Native name: Південний Буг (Ukrainian)

Location
- Country: Ukraine
- Cities: Khmelnytskyi, Khmilnyk, Vinnytsia, Haivoron, Pervomaisk, Voznesensk, Mykolaiv

Physical characteristics
- Source
  - location: Khmelnytskyi Oblast, Ukraine
- Mouth
  - location: Bug estuary, Ukraine
- Length: 806 km (501 mi)
- Basin size: 63,700 km^{2} (24,600 sq mi)
- Discharge
  - average: 108 m3/s

Basin features
- Progression: Dnieper–Bug estuary→ Black Sea

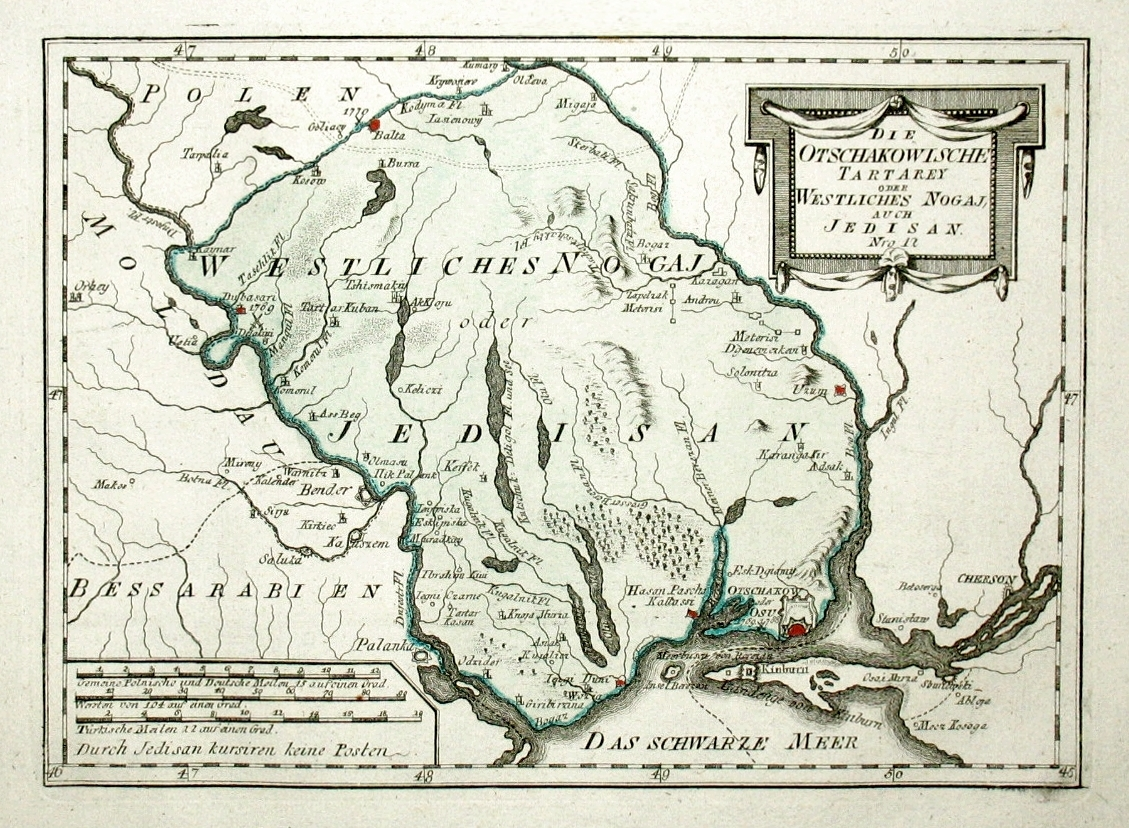
The river is named as Bog Fl[uss] on this 1791 Austrian map (in German).

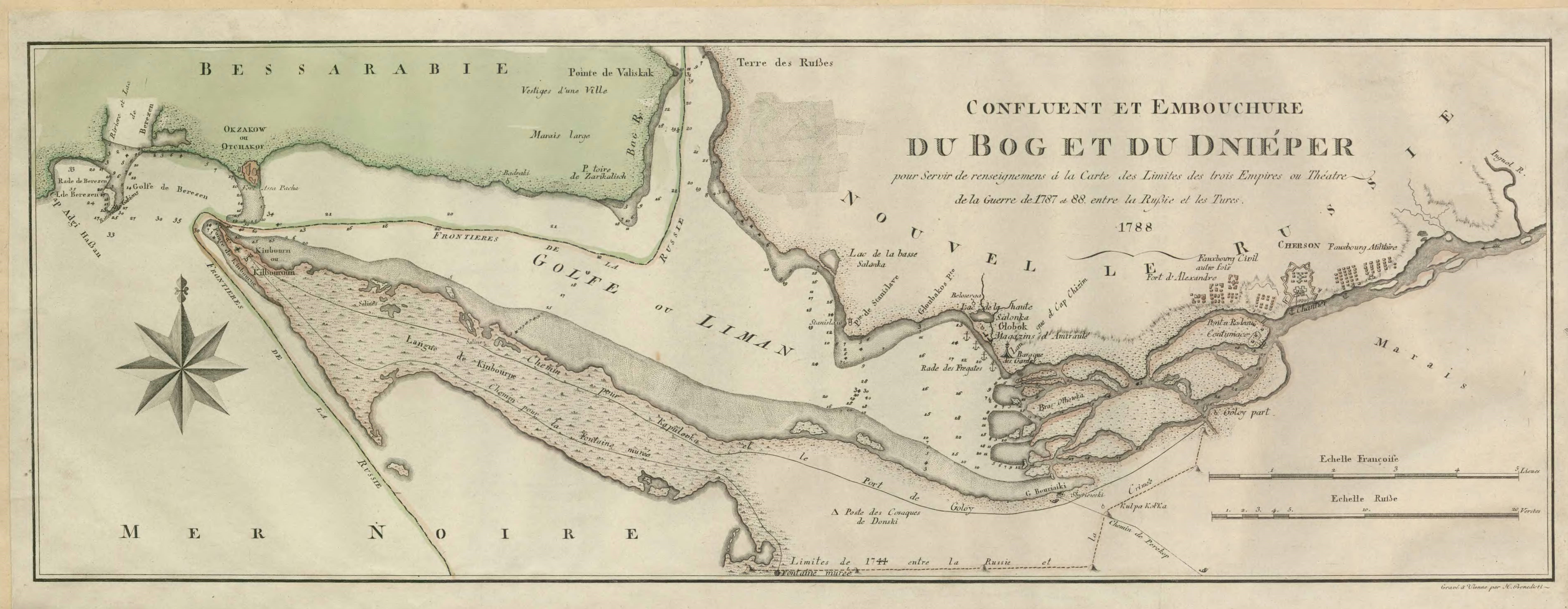
The river is named as Bog on this 1788 French map showing the Dnieper–Bug estuary (Liman).

The Southern Bug, also called Southern Buh (Ukrainian: Південний Буг, romanized: Pivdennyi Buh; Russian: Южный Буг, romanized: Yuzhny Bug; Crimean Tatar: Aq Suv; Romanian: Bugul de Sud or just Bug), and sometimes Boh River (Ukrainian: Бог; Polish: Boh), is a navigable river located in Ukraine. It is the longest river flowing exclusively in Ukraine, second only to the Ukrainian part of the Dnieper.

While located in relatively close proximity, the river should not be confused with the Western Bug or Bug, which flows in the opposite direction towards the Baltics. The source of the Southern Bug is in the west of Ukraine, in the Volhynian-Podolian Upland, about 145 kilometres (90 miles) from the Polish border, from where it flows southeasterly into the Bug Estuary (Black Sea basin) through the southern steppes (see Granite-steppe lands of Buh park). It is 806 kilometres (501 miles) long and drains 63,700 square kilometres (24,600 sq mi).

Several regionally important cities and towns in Ukraine are located on the Southern Bug. Beginning in Western Ukraine and moving downstream, in a southeasterly direction, they are: Khmelnytskyi, Khmilnyk, Vinnytsia, Haivoron, Pervomaisk, Voznesensk and Mykolaiv.

On several occasions the river served as an international border. At least following the 1768–1774 Russo-Turkish War, and more narrowly the Chyhyryn campaigns, the river became a border between the Imperial Russia and Ottomans. Some 200 years later between 1941 and 1944 during World War II the Southern Bug formed the border between German-occupied Ukraine (Reichskommissariat Ukraine) and the Romanian-occupied part of Ukraine, called Transnistria.

== Nomenclature and etymology ==
- Ukrainian: Південний Буг, romanized: Pivdennyi Buh
- Polish: Boh
- Romanian: Bugul de Sud or just Bug
- Russian: Южный Буг, romanized: Yuzhny Bug
- Ottoman Turkish: Aksu

Herodotus (c. 484–425 BCE) refers to the river using its ancient Greek name: Hypanis. During the Migration Period of the 5th to the 8th centuries CE the Southern Bug represented a major obstacle to all the migrating peoples in the area. In his work Getica, Jordanes calls the river Bogossola. Mentioning of Bogossola could also be found in works of Guido of Pisa.

The long-standing local Slavic name of the river, Boh (Cyrillic: Бог), according to Zbigniew Gołąb as *bugъ/*buga derives from Indo-European verbal root *bheug- (having cognates in old Germanic word *bheugh- etc. with meaning of "bend, turn, moves away"), with hypothetical original meaning of "pertaining to a (river) bend", and derivatives in Russian búga ("low banks of a river, overgrown with bushes"), Polish bugaj ("bushes or woods in a river valley or on a steep river bank"), Latvian bauga ("marshy place by a river"). The Polish linguist Jan Michał Rozwadowski was explaining that the name derived from the Indo-European root "water", "source", "swamp". The 17th-century French military engineer and geographer Guillaume Le Vasseur de Beauplan recorded the name of the river as Bog.

== History ==
From the 16th to the 18th centuries, most of the south of Ukraine was under Turkish imperial domination and the colonists renamed the river using their language to the Aq-su, meaning the "White river". Indigenous Slavic toponyms were re-established after the conquest of the Pontic region from Turkish domination in the 17th and 18th centuries.

On March 6, 1918, the Central Council of the Ukrainian People's Republic adopted a law on the "administrative-territorial division of Ukraine", dividing it into regional districts. One of these, Pobozhia (meaning lands of the Boh, Ukrainian: Побожжя), was in the upstream lands of the Southern Bug, near the source of the river.

== Tributaries ==
The main tributaries of the Southern Bug are, from source to mouth (length in parentheses):

- Left: Buzhok (75), Ikva (57), Snyvoda (58), Desna (80), Sob (115), Udych (56), Synytsia (78), Syniukha (111), Velyka Korabelna (45), Mertvovid (114), Hnylyi Yelanets (103), Inhul (354)
- Right: Vovk (71), Zghar (95), Riv, (104), Silnytsia (67), Dokhna (68), Savran (97), Kodyma (149), Bakshala (57), Chychyklia (156)

== Ecology ==
In October 2020, the Southern Bug was stocked with 350 kilograms (770 lb) of Hungarian carp and 50 kilograms (110 lb) of silver carp at Khmelnytskyi.

== Bridges and ferries ==
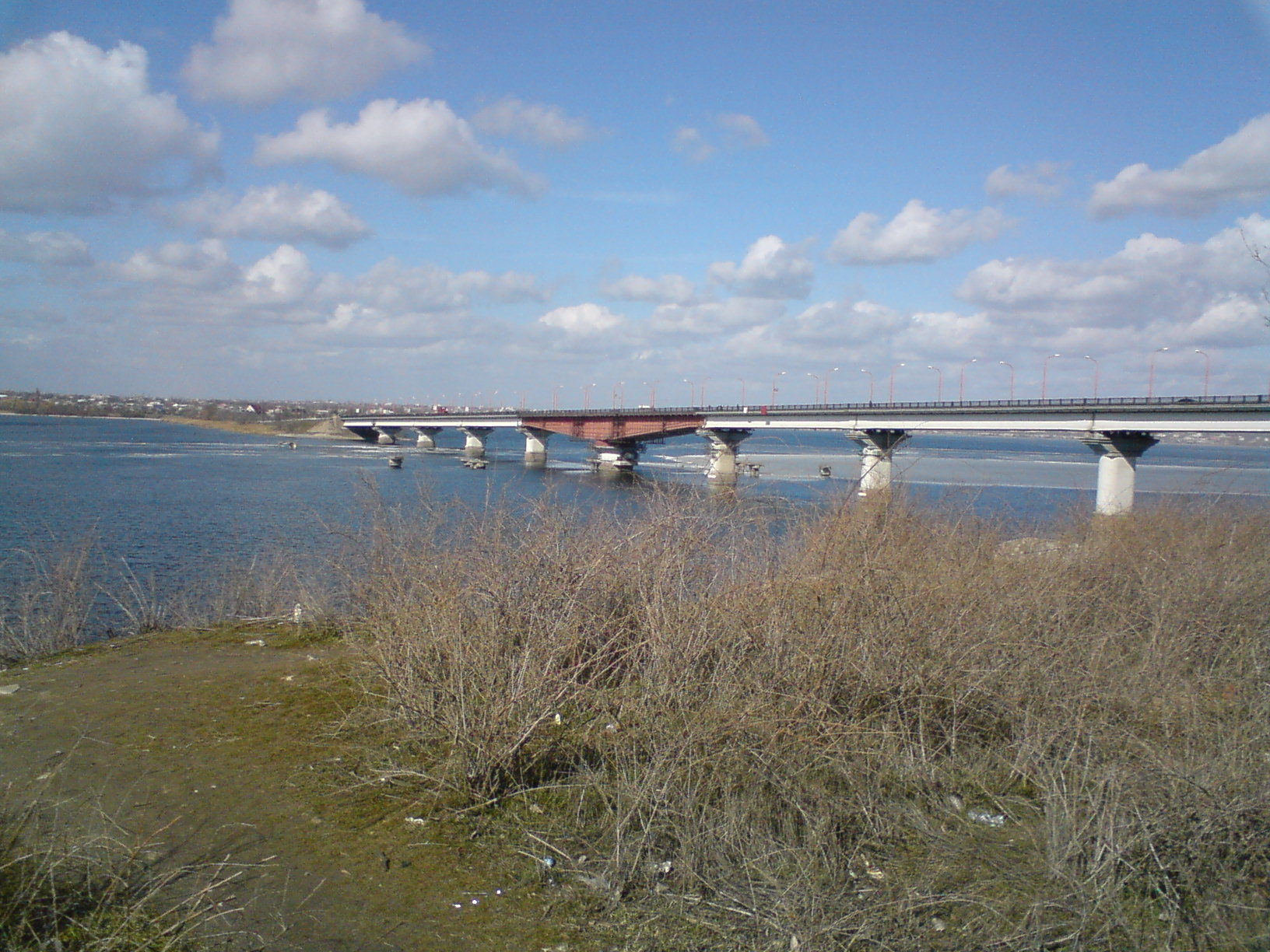
Varvarivskyi Bridge in Mykolaiv

The Varvarivskyi Bridge over Southern Bug in Mykolaiv is a swing bridge (facilitating ship building) with Europe's largest span (134 m; 440 ft). It is also the southernmost bridge over the river.

== Navigation ==
The river is technically navigable for dozens of kilometers up from its mouth; several river ports (such as Mykolaiv) exist.

In 2011, plans were announced to revive commercial freight navigation on the Southern Bug upstream of Mykolaiv, to facilitate the increasing grain export from Ukraine. As of April 2018, freight navigation was renewed between the estuary and a newly built grain terminal in the village of Prybuzhany, Voznesensk Raion, in the center of the Mykolaiv Oblast.

== Gallery ==
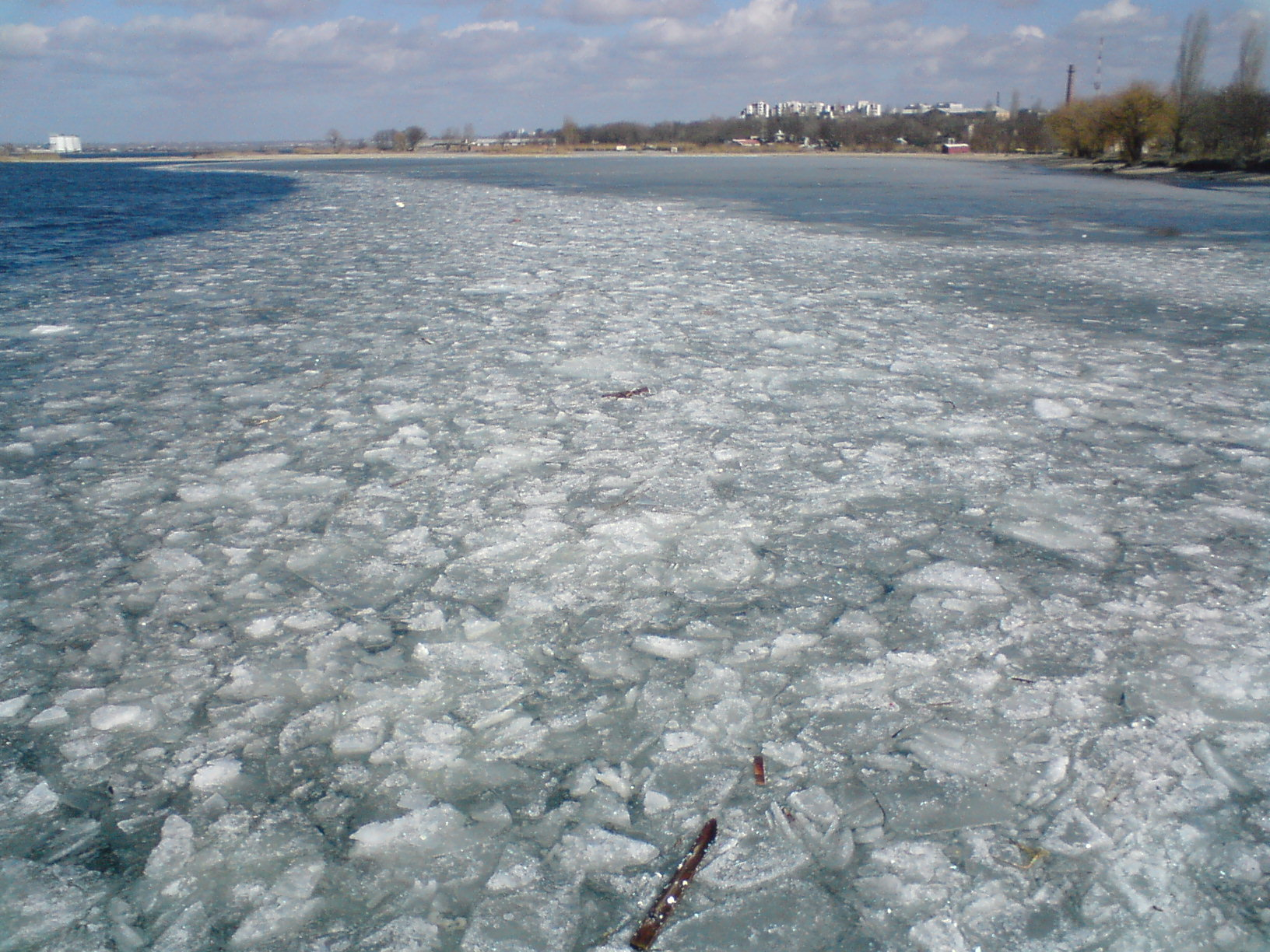
Winter-frozen Southern Bug in Mykolaiv

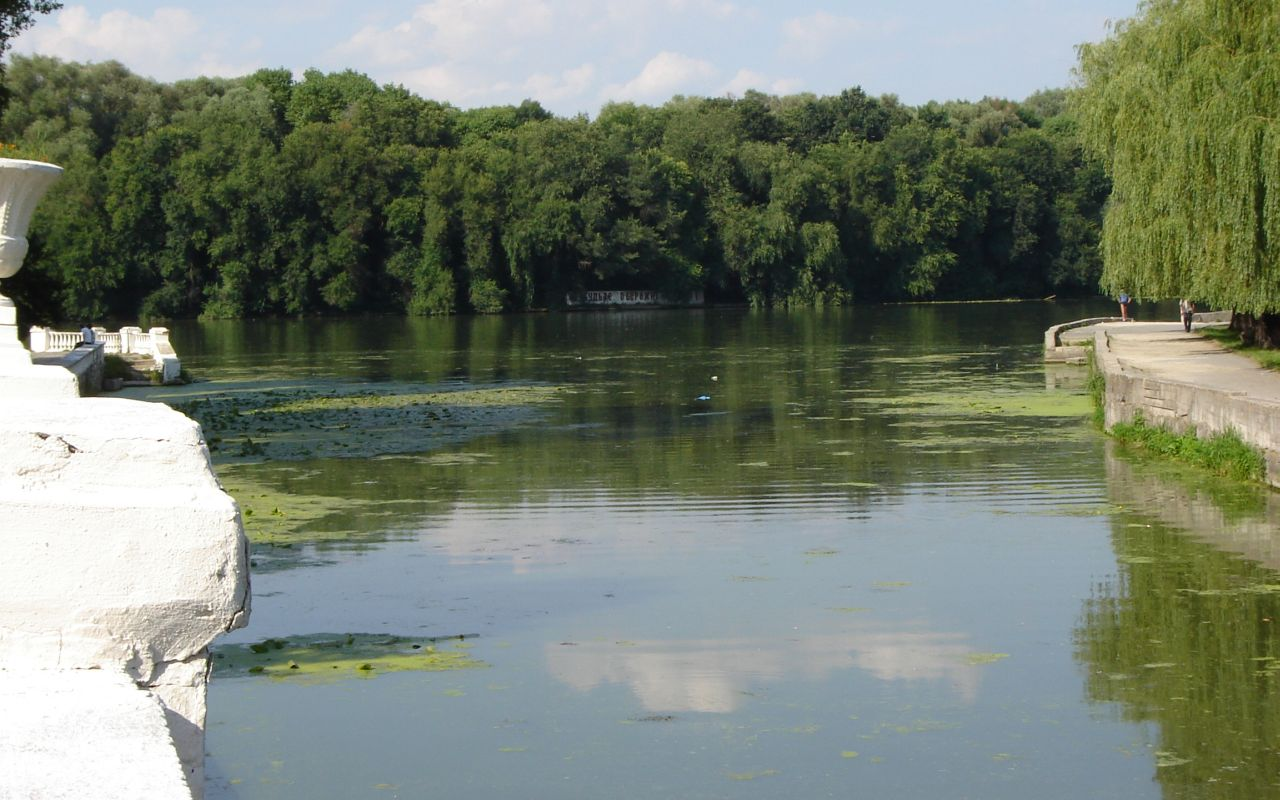
The Ploska River emptying into the Southern Bug

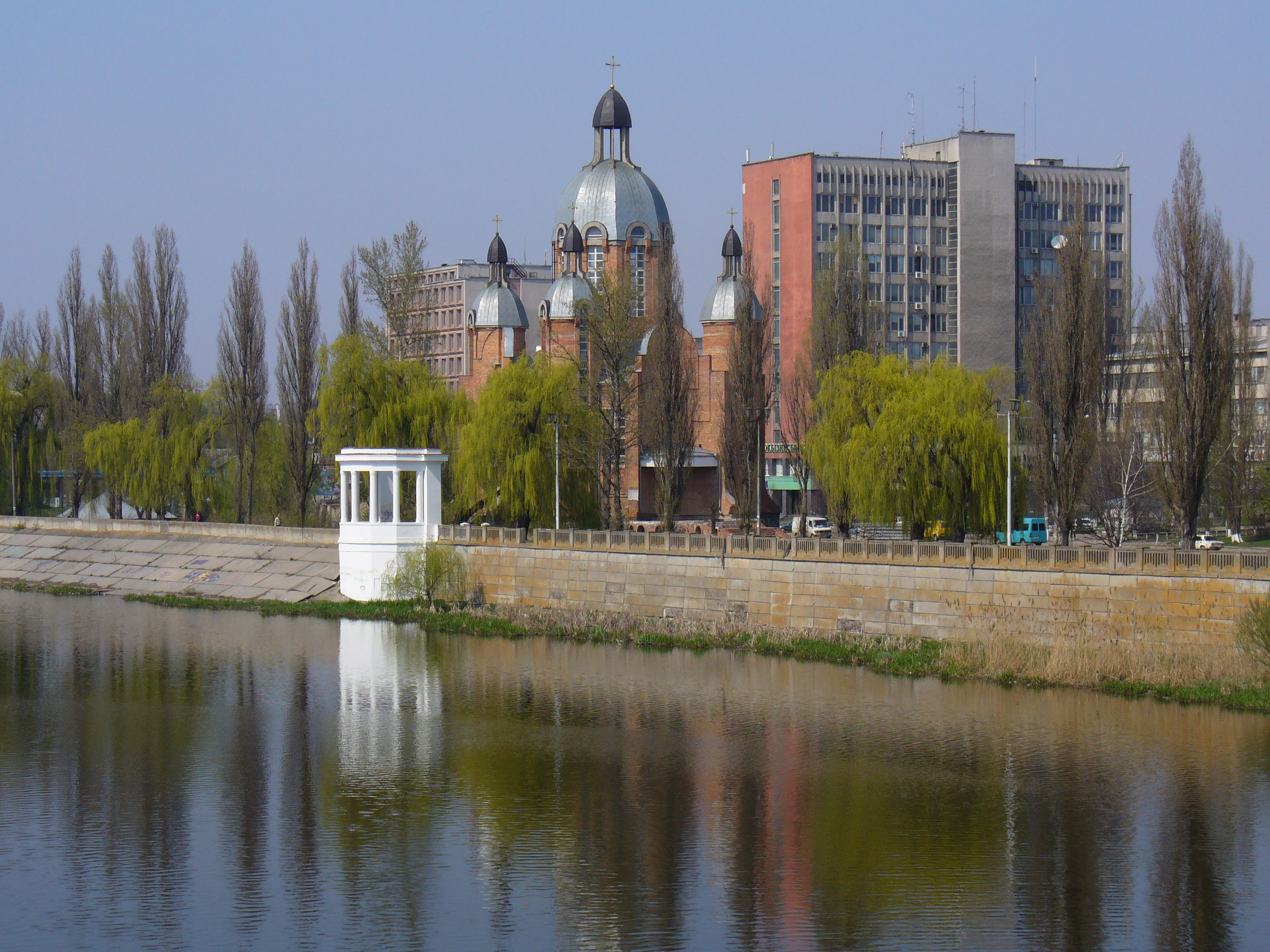
Southern Bug in Vinnytsia

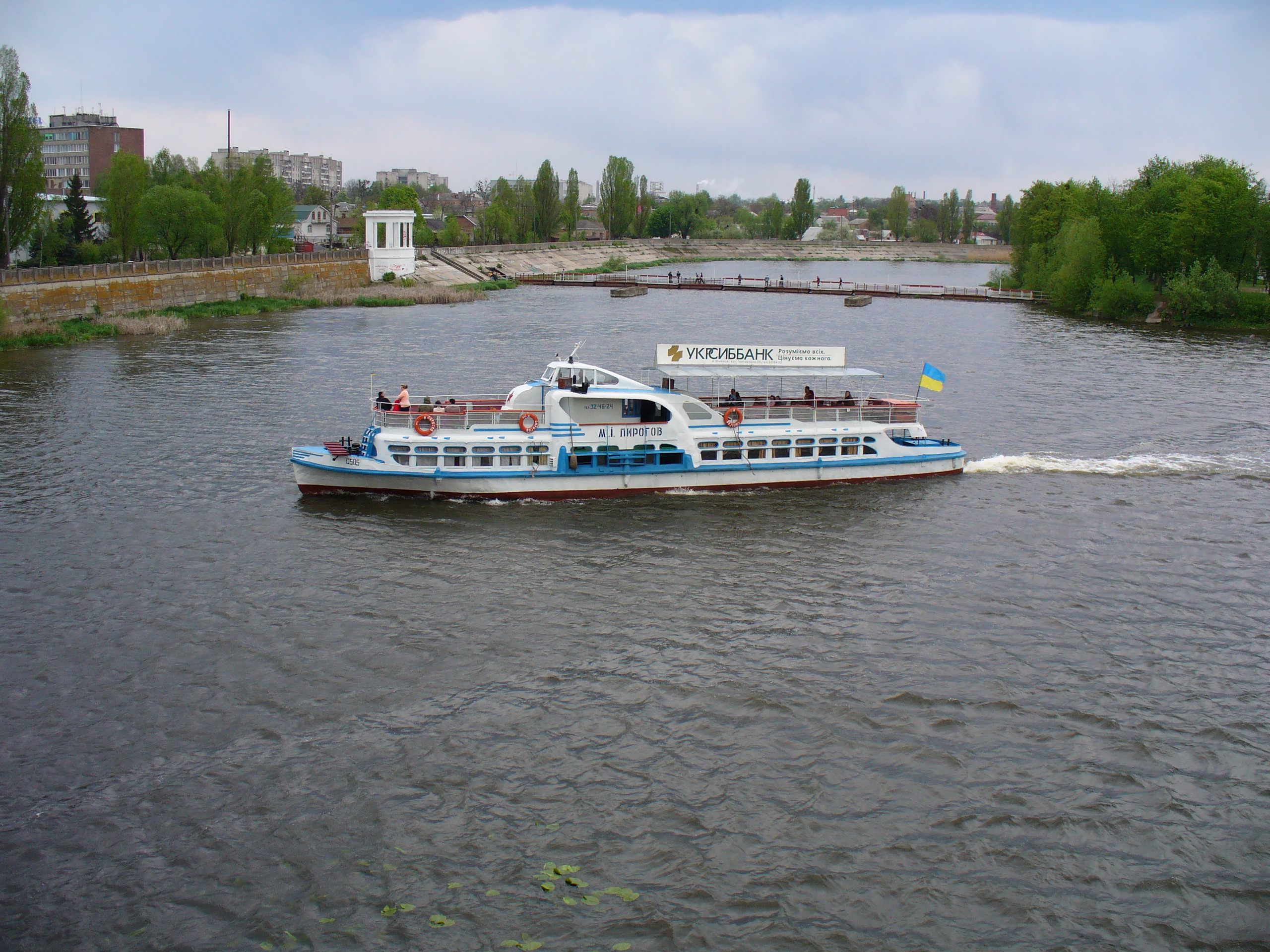
A riverboat on the river in Vinnytsia (2006)

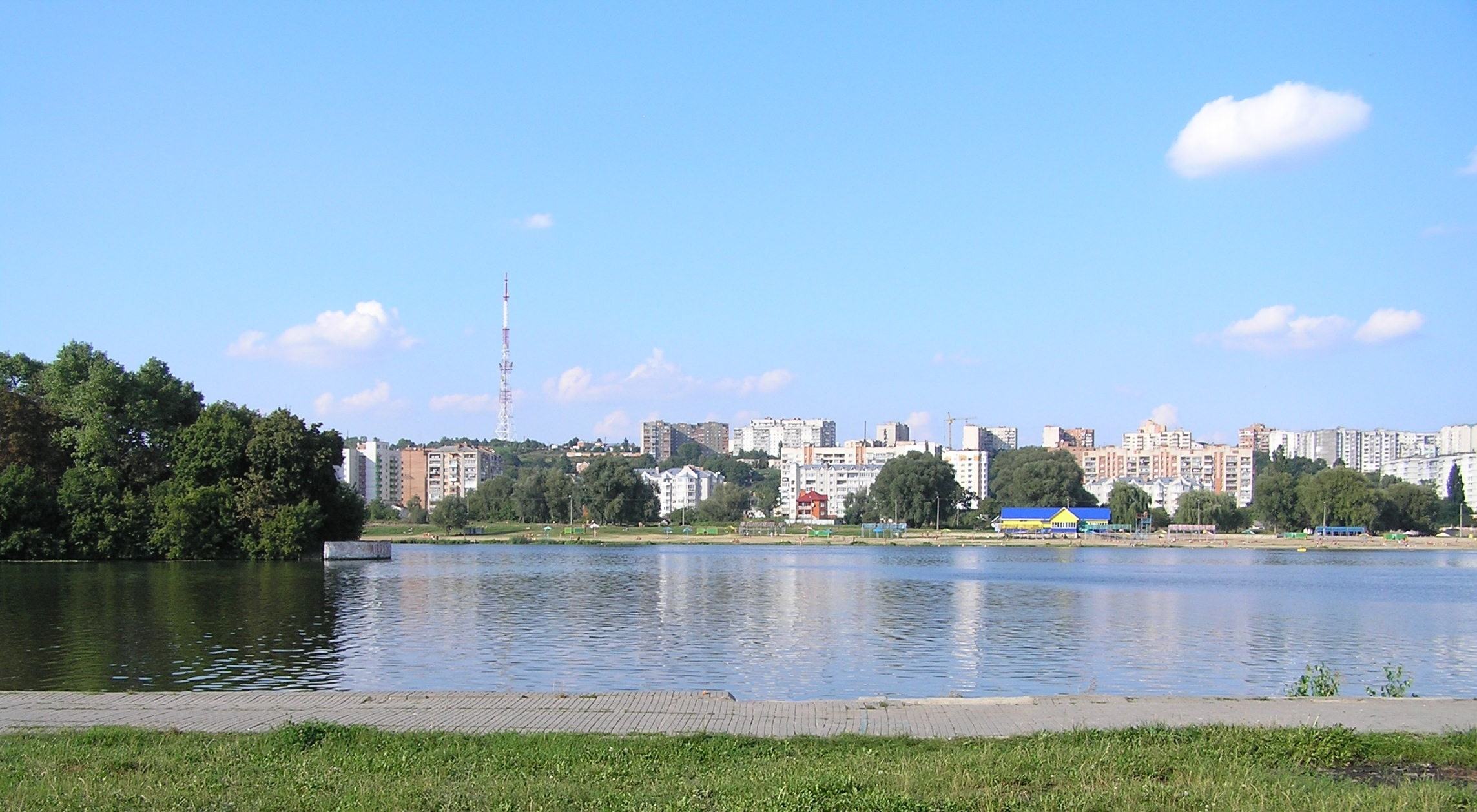
Riverside skyline of Khmelnytskyi

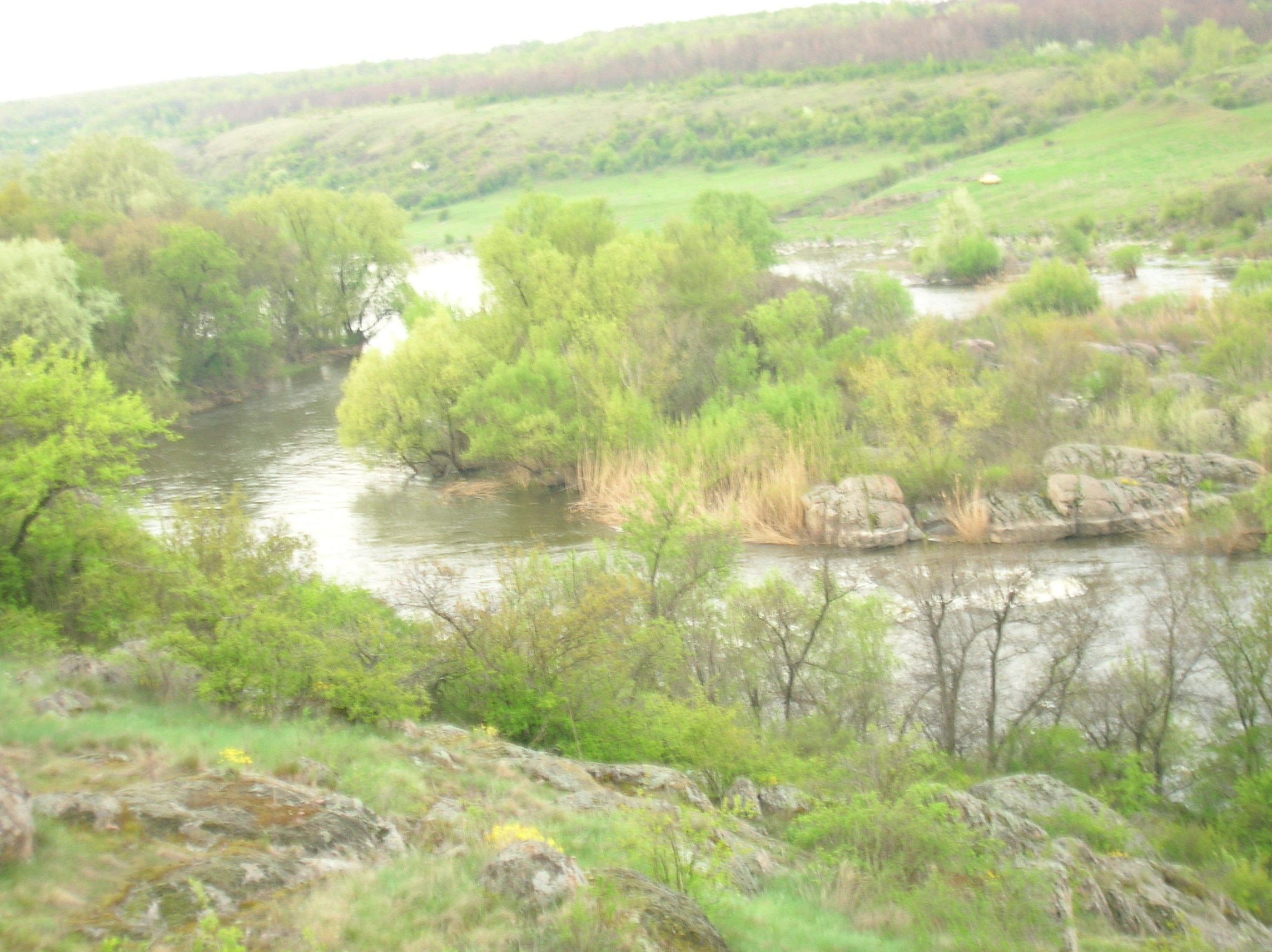
Southern Bug in vicinity of the Granite-steppe lands of Bug landscape park

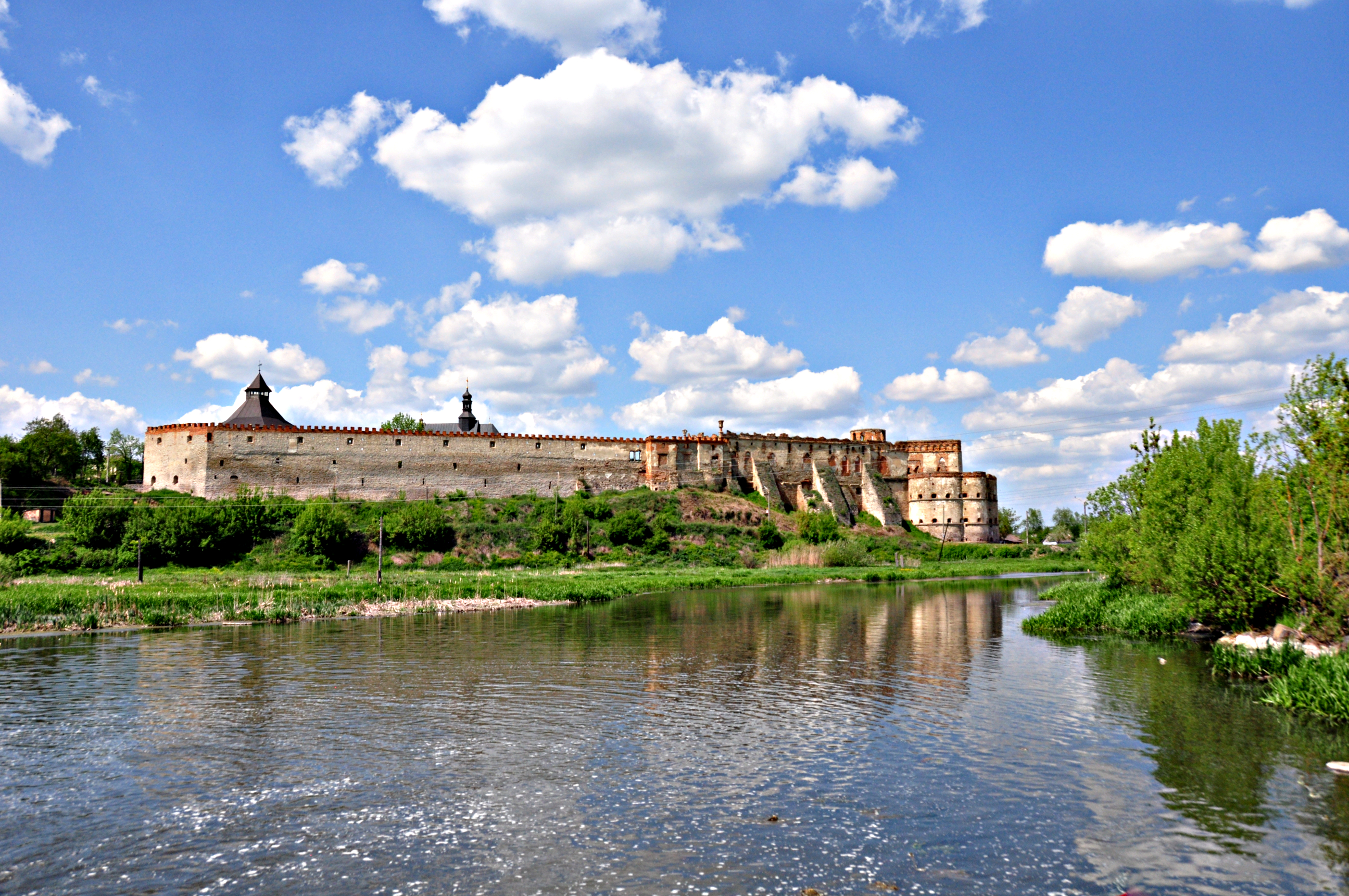
Southern Bug in Medzhybizh

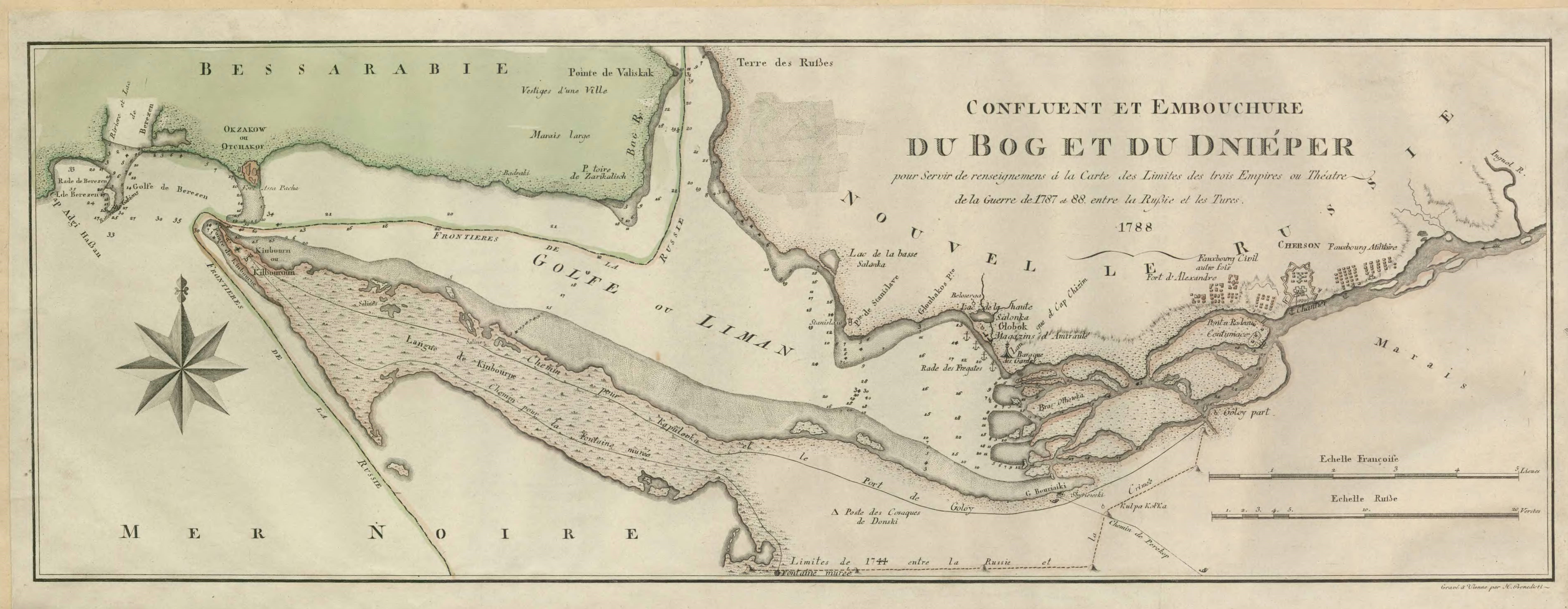
Historical map of the confluence of the rivers Southern Bug and Dnieper
