= Granite-steppe lands of Buh =

Protected landscape park in Mykolaiv Oblast, Ukraine

Granite steppes of Buh
- IUCN category V (protected landscape/seascape)
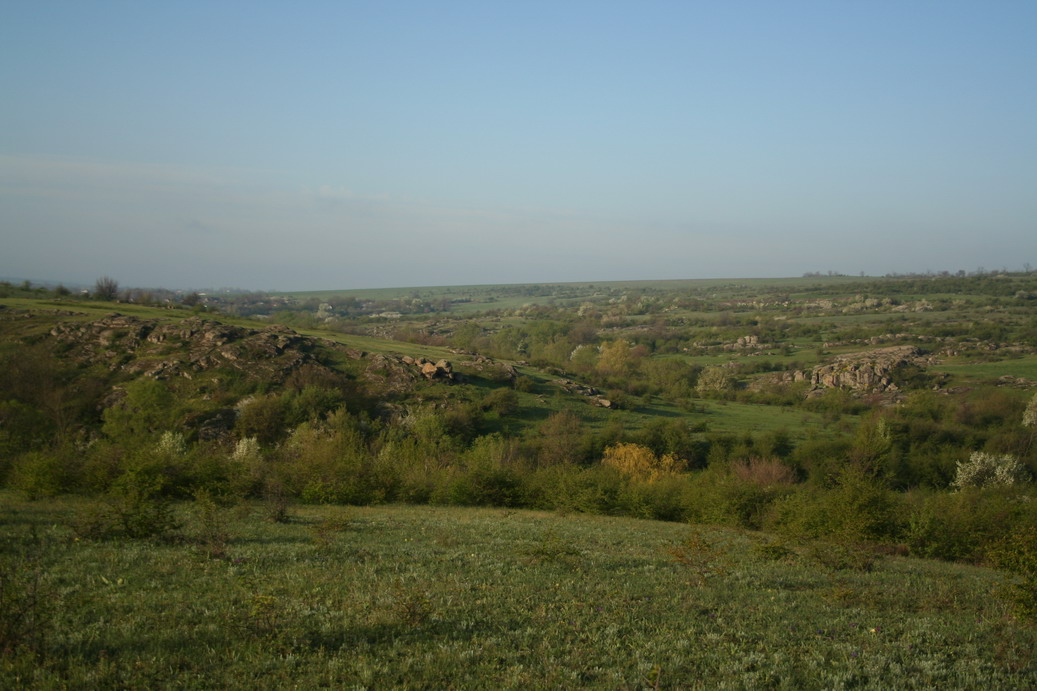
- Valley of Mertvovod
- Interactive map of Granite steppes of Buh
- Location: Mykolaiv Oblast, Ukraine
- Coordinates: 47°52′08″N 31°07′00″E
- Length: 70 km (43 mi)
- Area: 62.67 km^{2} (24.20 sq mi)
- Established: 1994
- Governing body: Mykolaiv Region State Administration

The Granite-steppe lands of Buh (Ukrainian: Регіональний ландшафтний парк «Гранітно-степове Побужжя») is a regional landscape park in the north-west of Mykolaiv Oblast in Ukraine.

The park includes the river valley of Southern Buh and the ravine-like valleys of its tributaries: Velyka Korabelna, Bashkala, and Mertvovod. The park stretches on 70 km (43 mi) from the southern part of Pervomaisk to the rural settlement of Oleksandrivka in Voznesensk Raion. It was established in 1994 by the decision of the Mykolaiv Oblast council and is located on the territory of Pervomaisk and Voznesensk raions. The area of the park is 6,267 ha (15,490 acres).

== Geology ==
The park is located at the southern edge of the Ukrainian crystalline shield in the spurs of the Podolian and Near-Dnipro Uplands. On the territory of the park the Southern Buh cuts into the crystalline massif (array) of the Ukrainian shield the outcome of which produced many rapids in the river. On the rocky banks are apparent types of the igneous rock that reveal granite.

The Granite-steppe lands of Buh represent the leftover spur of the ancient mountains once extending for 1000 km north-west to south-east from the Slovechansk-Ovruch mountain range to the Near-Azov Upland. As the result of the denudation process only the base of those mountains were left represented by the solid crystalline type of rock. Over the last 60 million years this part of land was not subjected to flooding.

== Environment ==
The most predominant are the Chernozem type of soil that occupies 95% of the territory. The floodplain of the Southern Buh valley and the islands partially covered by the floodplain woods and meadows. The slopes of the valley retained the parts of the rocky (petrofit) steppe and leftovers of the grass-rich of the Gramineae- type and shrub-rich steppes.

On the territory of the landscape park grows around 900 species of vascular plants, with 26 of them listed in the Red Book of Ukraine. Also, the park is inhabited by no less than 9000 species of insects (56 are in the Red Book) and about 300 species of vertebrate animals (46 - in the Red Book).

== History ==
On the territory of the landscape park in the valley of the Southern Bug, between villages Mihiya and Oleksandrivka are found almost 100 archeological monuments that present a continuous chronological series of Paleolithic (dating 30,000 years BCE) to the times of the formation of the Slavic ethnos. The particular interest present the remains of various people: Cimmerians, Trypillians, Sarmatians, ancient Slavic peoples, Romans.

In the park is a well-known tract Buh Gard, a historic landscape of local cultural heritage (ref#173/0/16-06) and what remains from the Cossacks settlement and a former seat of one of the districts (palanka) of the Zaporizhian Host. In 2006 due to construction of the Tashlyk HAES the tract was unlawfully flooded without any known prosecutions followed.

In 19th century, Viktor Skarzhynsky created in the place of the future landscape park an arboretum.

In 2008, the Granite steppes of Buh became of the Seven Natural Wonders of Ukraine and later was nominated as the world wonder candidate.
