= Bug estuary =

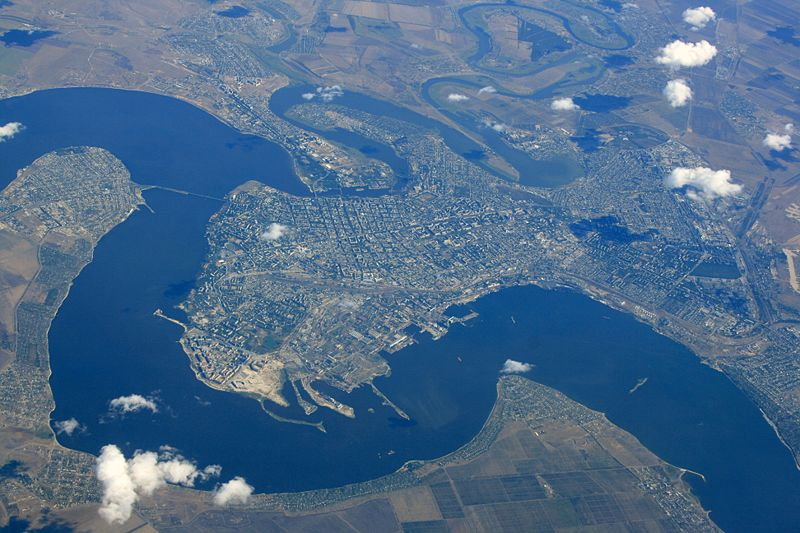
- Satellite view of the Bug estuary

- Location within Ukraine
- Location: Ukraine
- Coordinates: 46°52′N 31°59′E
- Type: estuary
- Primary inflows: Southern Bug
- Basin countries: Ukraine
- Max. length: 82 km (51 mi)
- Max. width: 11 km (6.8 mi)
- Settlements: Mykolaiv

The Bug estuary (Ukrainian: Бузький лиман, romanized: Buz'kyi lyman) is an estuary of the Southern Bug. It is 82 kilometres (51 mi) long and up to 11 kilometres (6.8 mi) wide. Together with the Dnieper estuary it makes the Dnieper–Bug estuary on the northern coast of the Black Sea. The city of Mykolaiv is located on the Bug estuary.
