= Porichchia, Mykolaiv Oblast =

Village in Mykolaiv Oblast, Ukraine

Coordinates: 47°23′10″N 31°7′5″E

Porichchia (Ukrainian: Поріччя) is a village in Voznesensk Raion, Mykolaiv Oblast, Ukraine. It belongs to Veselynove settlement hromada, one of the hromadas of Ukraine. During the 19th and early 20th century, the village was known as Rastatt.

== Geography ==
Porichchia lies on the Chychyklia River. It is 3 km from the village of Hradivka, 10 km from the village of Veselynove, and 35 km from Voznesens'k.

== History ==
=== Population ===
- 1811: 470
- 1817: 415
- 1859: 1,307
- 1881: 2,422
- 1885: 2,458
- 1890: 1,690
- 1894: 2,543
- 1900: 3,691
- 1913: 3,807
- 1924: 2,676
- 1942: 3,000

=== German colonist era ===
The village was settled in spring of 1810 by ethnic German colonists at the invitation of Alexander I of Russia. It was named Rastatt after the town in Baden. The residents entered Russia in 1809, but wintered at Odessa before settling there in 1810. While the adobe houses were being constructed during the first summer, the colonists had to live in hastily constructed reed huts. The colonists received food rations and a loan from the Russian government to buy farm equipment.

The founding families included 41 families from the Palatinate, 32 from Baden, and 21 from Alsace. The population faced a typhoid epidemic in October 1811 that killed 150 people.

The first schoolmaster in Rastadt was Peter Eberts, who immigrated from Rülzheim, in the Palatinate, in 1811, and ultimately became wealthy by grinding grain in the four grist mills he built in the area. The village's first mayor Mathias Koffler from Durmershiem.

=== Modern era ===
Until 18 July 2020, Porichchia belonged to Veselynove Raion. In July 2020, as part of the administrative reform of Ukraine, which reduced the number of raions of Mykolaiv Oblast to four, Veselynove Raion was merged into Voznesensk Raion.

== Religion ==
From the 1810 settlement until the Second World War, most of the residents of the village spoke German day to day, and the dominant religion in the village was Roman Catholicism.

A Catholic church was built in Rastatt in 1812 under the direction of the first pastor of Rastatt, Johannes Koervers. A new larger church was built in 1872, dedicated to St. Francis Xavier, made of quarried stone with two towers that were 130 feet tall. It was built under the leadership of Father Hieronymus Swienzizsky, at a cost of over 35,000 rubles.
