= Volodymyrivka =

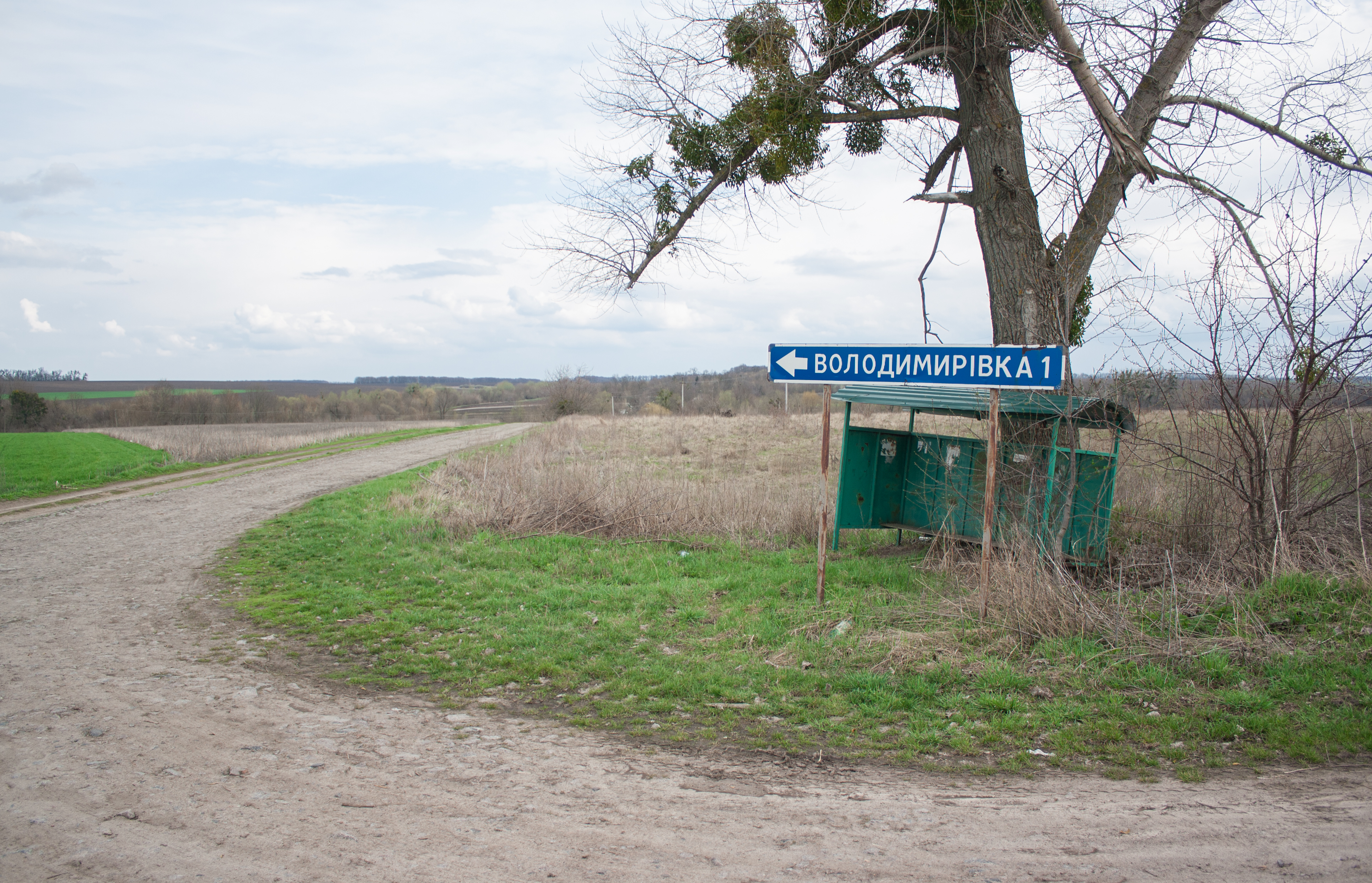
road sign with the name

Volodymyrivka (Ukrainian: Володимирівка) is a name of places often in Ukraine, and particularly east of Zbruch river. It is a derivative of the name Volodymyr. It may refer to the following places:

== Cherkasy Oblast ==
- Volodymyrivka, Cherkasy Oblast, rural settlement in Uman Raion

== Chernihiv Oblast ==
- Volodymyrivka, Chernihiv Raion, Chernihiv Oblast, village in Chernihiv Raion
- Volodymyrivka, Novhorod-Siverskyi Raion, Chernihiv Oblast, village in Novhorod-Siverskyi Raion
- The former name of Dymyrivka, a village in Pryluky Raion

== Crimea ==
- Volodymyrivka, Bilohirsk Raion, Crimea, village in Bilohirsk Raion, formerly Köneçi
- Volodymyrivka, Chornomorske Raion, Crimea, village in Chornomorske Raion, formerly Bay Qıyat
- Volodymyrivka, Saky Raion, Crimea, village in Saky Raion

== Dnipropetrovsk Oblast ==
- Volodymyrivka, Krynychky settlement hromada, Kamianske Raion, Dnipropetrovsk Oblast, village in Krynychky settlement hromada, Kamianske Raion
- Volodymyrivka, Lykhivka settlement hromada, Kamianske Raion, Dnipropetrovsk Oblast, village in Lykhivka settlement hromada, Kamianske Raion
- Volodymyrivka, Apostolove urban hromada, Kryvyi Rih Raion, Dnipropetrovsk Oblast, village in Apostolove urban hromada, Kryvyi Rih Raion
- Volodymyrivka, Devladove rural hromada, Kryvyi Rih Raion, Dnipropetrovsk Oblast, village in Devladove rural hromada, Kryvyi Rih Raion
- Volodymyrivka, Sofiivka settlement hromada, Kryvyi Rih Raion, Dnipropetrovsk Oblast, village in Sofiivka settlement hromada, Kryvyi Rih Raion
- Volodymyrivka, Synelnykove Raion, Dnipropetrovsk Oblast, village in Synelnykove Raion

== Donetsk Oblast ==
- Volodymyrivka, Bakhmut Raion, Donetsk Oblast, village in Bakhmut Raion
- Volodymyrivka, Pokrovsk Raion, Donetsk Oblast, village in Pokrovsk Raion
- Volodymyrivka, Volnovakha Raion, Donetsk Oblast, urban-type settlement in Volnovakha Raion

== Kharkiv Oblast ==
- Volodymyrivka, Bohodukhiv Raion, Kharkiv Oblast, rural settlement in Bohodukhiv Raion
- Volodymyrivka, Natalyne rural hromada, Berestyn Raion, Kharkiv Oblast, village in Natalyne rural hromada, Krasnohrad Raion
- Volodymyrivka, Sakhnovshchyna settlement hromada, Berestyn Raion, Kharkiv Oblast, village in Sakhnovshchyna settlement hromada, Krasnohrad Raion
- Volodymyrivka, Kupiansk Raion, Kharkiv Oblast, village in Kupiansk Raion

== Kherson Oblast ==
- Volodymyrivka, Henichesk Raion, Kherson Oblast, village in Henichesk Raion
- Volodymyrivka, Kakhovka Raion, Kherson Oblast, village in Kakhovka Raion
- Volodymyrivka, Skadovsk Raion, Kherson Oblast, village in Skadovsk Raion

== Kirovohrad Oblast ==
- Volodymyrivka, Holovanivsk Raion, Kirovohrad Oblast, village in Holovanivsk Raion
  - Volodymyrivka (excavation site), archaeological site in the above village
- Volodymyrivka, Katerynivka rural hromada, Kropyvnytskyi Raion, Kirovohrad Oblast, village in Katerynivka rural hromada, Kropyvnytskyi Raion
- Volodymyrivka, Kompaniivka settlement hromada, Kropyvnytskyi Raion, Kirovohrad Oblast, village in Kompaniivka settlement hromada, Kropyvnytskyi Raion
- Volodymyrivka, Subottsi rural hromada, Kropyvnytskyi Raion, Kirovohrad Oblast, village in Subottsi rural hromada, Kropyvnytskyi Raion
- Volodymyrivka, Novoukrainka Raion, Kirovohrad Oblast, village in Novoukrainka Raion
- Volodymyrivka, Oleksandriia Raion, Kirovohrad Oblast, village in Oleksandriia Raion

== Kyiv Oblast ==
- Volodymyrivka, Bila Tserkva urban hromada, Bila Tserkva Raion, Kyiv Oblast, village in Bila Tserkva urban hromada, Bila Tserkva Raion
- Volodymyrivka, Tashan rural hromada, Bila Tserkva Raion, Kyiv Oblast, village in Tashan rural hromada, Bila Tserkva Raion
- Volodymyrivka, Volodarka settlement hromada, Bila Tserkva Raion, Kyiv Oblast, village in Volodarka settlement hromada, Bila Tserkva Raion
- Volodymyrivka, Vyshhorod Raion, Kyiv Oblast, village in Vyshhorod Raion, Kyiv Oblast

== Luhansk Oblast ==
- Volodymyrivka, Luhansk Oblast, village in Svatove Raion

== Mykolaiv Oblast ==
- Volodymyrivka, Sofivka rural hromada, Bashtanka Raion, Mykolaiv Oblast, village in Sofivka rural hromada, Bashtanka Raion, Mykolaiv Oblast
- Volodymyrivka, Volodymyrivka rural hromada, Bashtanka Raion, Mykolaiv Oblast, village in Volodymyrivka rural hromada, Bashtanka Raion, Mykolaiv Oblast
- Volodymyrivka, Mykolaiv Raion, Mykolaiv Oblast, village in Mykolaiv Raion, Mykolaiv Oblast
- Volodymyrivka, Shchaslyvka Starostyn district, Domanivka settlement hromada, Voznesensk Raion, Mykolaiv Oblast, village in Shchaslyvka Starostyn district, Domanivka settlement hromada, Voznesensk Raion
- Volodymyrivka, Volodymyrivka Starostyn district, Domanivka settlement hromada, Voznesensk Raion, Mykolaiv Oblast, village in Volodymyrivka Starostyn district, Domanivka settlement hromada, Voznesensk Raion

== Odesa Oblast ==
- Volodymyrivka, Berezivka Raion, Odesa Oblast, village in Berezivka Raion
- Volodymyrivka, Bilhorod-Dnistrovskyi Raion, Odesa Oblast, village in Bilhorod-Dnistrovskyi Raion
- Volodymyrivka, Bolhrad Raion, Kirovohrad Oblast, village in Bolhrad Raion
- Volodymyrivka, Okny settlement hromada, Podilsk Raion, Odesa Oblast, village in Okny settlement hromada, Podilsk Raion
- Volodymyrivka, Zelenohirske settlement hromada, Podilsk Raion, Odesa Oblast, village in Zelenohirske settlement hromada, Podilsk Raion
- Volodymyrivka, Rozdilna urban hromada, Rozdilna Raion, Odesa Oblast, village in Rozdilna urban hromada, Rozdilna Raion
- Volodymyrivka, Zatyshshia settlement hromada, Rozdilna Raion, Odesa Oblast, village in Zatyshshia settlement hromada, Rozdilna Raion

== Poltava Oblast ==
- Volodymyrivka, Myrhorod Raion, Poltava Oblast, village in Myrhorod Raion
- Volodymyrivka, Poltava Raion, Poltava Oblast, village in Poltava Raion

== Sumy Oblast ==
- Volodymyrivka, Khmeliv rural hromada, Romny Raion, Sumy Oblast, village in Khmeliv rural hromada, Romny Raion
- Volodymyrivka, Nedryhailiv settlement hromada, Romny Raion, Sumy Oblast, village in Nedryhailiv settlement hromada, Romny Raion
- Volodymyrivka, Sumy Raion, Sumy Oblast, village in Sumy Raion

== Vinnytsia Oblast ==
- Volodymyrivka, Khmilnyk Raion, Vinnytsia Oblast, village in Khmilnyk Raion
- Volodymyrivka, Mohyliv-Podilskyi Raion, Vinnytsia Oblast, village in Mohyliv-Podilskyi Raion
- Volodymyrivka, Vinnytsia Raion, Vinnytsia Oblast, village in Vinnytsia Raion
- Volodymyrivka, Zhmerynka Raion, Vinnytsia Oblast, rural settlement in Zhmerynka Raion

== Volyn Oblast ==
- Volodymyrivka, Volyn Oblast, village in Volodymyr Raion

== Zaporizhzhia Oblast ==
- Volodymyrivka, Pryazovske settlement hromada, Melitopol Raion, Zaporizhzhia Oblast, village in Pryazovske settlement hromada, Melitopol Raion
- Volodymyrivka, Yakymivka settlement hromada, Melitopol Raion, Zaporizhzhia Oblast, village in Yakymivka settlement hromada, Melitopol Raion
- Volodymyrivka, Vasylivka Raion, Zaporizhzhia Oblast, village in Vasylivka Raion
- Volodymyrivka, Zaporizhzhia Raion, Zaporizhzhia Oblast, village in Zaporizhzhia Raion

== Zhytomyr Oblast ==
- Volodymyrivka, Baranivka urban hromada, Zviahel Raion, Zhytomyr Oblast, village in Baranivka urban hromada, Zviahel Raion
- Volodymyrivka, Yemilchyne settlement hromada, Zviahel Raion, Zhytomyr Oblast, village in Yemilchyne settlement hromada, Zviahel Raion

== See also ==
- Volodymyrivka (excavation site)
- Vladimirovka (disambiguation), the Russian language cognate
- uk:Володимирівка, a more extensive list in Ukrainian Wiki
