= Berezan =

Berezan may refer to:

- Berezan, Kyiv Oblast, a city in Ukraine
- Berezan Island, an island in the Black Sea
- Berezan' Runestone, discovered in 1905
- Berezan River
  - Berezan Estuary, open estuary on the northern coast of the Black Sea

== People ==
- Jennifer Berezan (born 1961), Canadian singer-songwriter, producer, and activist
- Perry Berezan (born 1964), Canadian ice hockey centre
