= Berezan (river) =

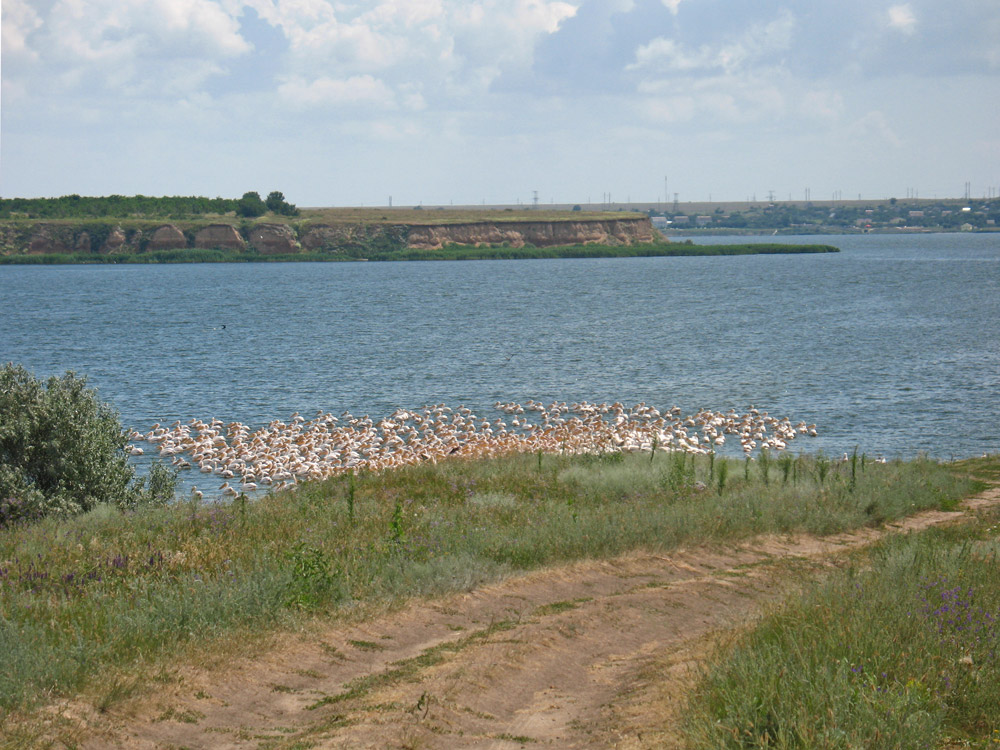
- River estuary
- Native name: Березань (Ukrainian)

Location
- Country: Ukraine

Physical characteristics
- Mouth
  - coordinates: 46.8363°N 31.5868°E

The Berezan is a Ukrainian river flowing into the Berezan Estuary of the Black Sea. The river is 49 km long, and the catchment area is 890 km^{2}. Slope 1.5 m / km. The trapezoidal river valley is 2 km wide. The channel is meandering, in the upper reaches 5 m wide, 1.2–1.5 m deep. In the summer it partially dries up. It is used for irrigation.

The river originates from the village of Stepove and flows through the territory of the Voznesensk and Mykolaiv raions of Mykolaiv Oblast.

In 1974, near the village of Yablonya, in the Berezan River basin, burial 11 of mound 11 was investigated, which belongs to the Sivashovka-type monuments of the 2nd half of the 7th century - early 8th century.

== Etymology ==
Vladimir Nikonov (1904–1988) indicates that the name may be derived from the Avestan berezant, Scythian bresant, which means high.

== History ==
In ancient times, the river was in Sarmatia and was named Sagaris. The Beresan District of Black Sea German colonists was located on the Berezan in the 19th century, when the area was known as South Russia. From 1809 to 1820, eleven German-Russian "mother colonies" were founded in the Beresan Valley: seven Catholic (Karlsruhe, Katharinental, Landau, München, Rastatt, Speyer, and Sulz) and four Lutheran (Johannestal, Rohrbach, Waterloo, and Worms).

== See also ==
- Berezan Estuary
- Berezan Island
- Berezan' Runestone
