= Mykolaivka, Mykolaiv Oblast =

Mykolaivka Микола́ївка
- Location within Ukraine
- Coordinates: 47°47′40″N 31°28′24″E
- Country: Ukraine
- Raion: Voznesensk Raion
- Oblast: Mykolaiv Oblast
- Hromada: Bratske settlement hromada
- Established: 1782

Area
  - Total: 1.03 km^{2} (0.40 sq mi)
- Elevation: 99 m (325 ft)

Population (2001)
  - Total: 497
  - Density: 483/km^{2} (1,250/sq mi)
- Postal code: 55460
- Area code: +380 5131

Mykolaivka (Ukrainian: Микола́ївка) is a village in the Voznesensk Raion of Mykolaiv Oblast, in Ukraine. The population is 497 people. The body of local self-government is the Mykolaiv Village Council.

== Geography ==
The village of Mykolaivka is located 29 km from Voznesensk and 14 km from Bratske. The Balka Solona river flows through the village.

== History ==
The village was founded in 1782 under the original name Skarzhinka (Ukrainian: Скаржинка). According to data for 1859, 309 people (150 men and 159 women) lived in the village, and there were 45 farmsteads.

As of 1886, 442 people lived in the former proprietary village of the Trikrat Volost, there were 70 yards, and there was an inn.

On 12 June 2020, in the course of decentralization, the Mykolaiv Village Council was merged with the Bratsk settlement community. On 17 July 2020, as a result of the administrative-territorial reform and liquidation of Bratsky District, the village became part of Voznesensk Raion.

== Demographics ==
According to the 1989 Soviet Census, the population of the village was 538 people, of whom 253 were men and 285 were women.

According to the 2001 Ukrainian Census, 500 people lived in the village, and their native language was distributed as such:

Language	Percentage
Ukrainian	93.36%
Moldovan	3.62%
Russian	2.21%
Gagauz	0.80%
