= Ukrainka =

Ukrainka (meaning "Ukrainian woman") may refer to:

== People ==
- Lesya Ukrainka (1871–1913), Ukrainian poet and writer
  - Lesya Ukrainka Boulevard, a street in Kyiv named after her in 1961

== Places ==
Russia

- Ukrainka, Seryshevsky District, Amur Oblast
- Ukrainka (air base), military air base in Russian Far East

Ukraine

- Ukrainka, Kherson Oblast, a village in Beryslav Raion, Kherson Oblast
- Ukrainka, Halytsynove rural hromada, Mykolaiv Raion, Mykolaiv Oblast, a village in Mykolaiv Raion, Mykolaiv Oblast
- Ukrainka, Kobleve rural hromada, Mykolaiv Raion, Mykolaiv Oblast, a village in Mykolaiv Raion, Mykolaiv Oblast
- Ukrainka, Kyiv Oblast, a city in Kyiv Oblast
