= Hradivka =

Hradivka (Ukrainian: Гра́дівка) may refer to two places in Ukraine:

- Hradivka, Lviv Oblast, village in Horodok Raion, Lviv Oblast
- Hradivka, Mykolaiv Oblast, village in Veselynove Raion, Mykolaiv Oblast
