= Novosvitlivka, Mykolaiv Oblast =

Village in Mykolaiv Oblast, Ukraine

Novosvitlivka Новосвітлівка
- Village
- Location of Novosvitlivka in Mykolaiv Oblast Location of Novosvitlivka in Ukraine
- Coordinates: 47°11′50″N 31°11′06″E
- Country: Ukraine
- Oblast: Mykolaiv Oblast
- Raion: Voznesensk Raion
- Founded: 1809
- Elevation: 77 m (253 ft)

Population (2001)
  - Total: 1,410
- Time zone: UTC+2 (EET)
  - Summer (DST): UTC+3 (EEST)
- Postal code: 57055
- Area code: +380 5163

Novosvitlivka (Ukrainian: Новосвітлівка) is a village in Voznesensk Raion, Mykolaiv Oblast in Southern Ukraine. It was originally founded as Rohrbach, South Russia by German settlers in 1809.

== History ==
In 1886, 2,485 people lived in the German colony of Worms, Rohrbach Volost, Odesa County, Kherson Province, there were 260 farmsteads, 2 prayer houses, 2 schools, 8 benches, and a steam mill. From 1925 to 1939, the village (under the name Rohrbach) was part of the Karl-Liebknecht German National District of the Mykolaiv District (since 1932, Odesa Oblast).

Until 18 July 2020, Novosvitlivka was located in Veselynove Raion. The raion was abolished in July 2020 as part of the administrative reform of Ukraine, which reduced the number of raions in Mykolaiv Oblast to four. The area of Veselynove Raion was merged into Voznesensk Raion.

Novosvitlivka was originally settled by German settlers as Rohrbach, which is located 90 versts or approximately 61 miles northeast of the city of Odessa (a port city on the Black Sea and now part of Ukraine) or 130 versts or 86 miles northwest of Kherson which served as the center of District Government for the Beresan German Russian Colonies. The Beresan District lies between the Bug River and the Tiligul River and is bordered on the south by the north shore of the Black Sea. Its closest neighbor is the village of Worms, located six versts or four miles from Rohrbach.

Rohrbach, located four miles southeast of Worms, was founded in 1809 as was Worms. The original group of settlers totaled 26 families, and given its proximity to Worms, the colonists from both villages may have traveled together to the Black Sea area.

In 1810, an additional 69 families arrived. As in Worms, construction of houses was not completed until 1810. According to Dr Karl Stumpp, of the 100-plus families that settled in Rohrbach, 33 came from Baden, 4 from Württemberg, 12 from the Pfalz, 7 from Prussian Poland, and 44 from Alsace. Other sources lump the colonists from the Pfalz and Alsace together since both were French territory.

Additional families continued to arrive in 1813: 22 from Prussian Poland and 4 from Württemberg. Between 1817 and 1819, 16 additional families from Baden and six additional families from other colonies settled in Rohrbach. By 1838 the population of Rohrbach totaled 683 individuals, comprising 148 families.

According to the 1848 Schoolmaster's Report for Rohrbach, written by Schoolmaster Fritschle, two colonists who had originated in Rohrbach, Germany, gave the Russian village of Rohrbach its name. They were Peter Schmidt and Peter Nuss.

Most of the German colonists of this region came to the Russian Empire to seek economic and religious freedom and to escape the devastation that was raging in Western Europe as the result of the French Revolution and the Napoleonic Wars. Most of the western German states bordering on the Rhine River were overrun by French occupation forces, and German youth were being conscripted into the French army. Taxation to support Napoleon’s exploits was extreme. As political boundaries shifted as a result of military invasions, these oppressed people were eager to leave Western Europe. They were offered free land, freedom of religion, and exemption from military service in the Black Sea region. This region had been acquired by the Russian Empire from the Ottoman Turkish Empire through a series of wars. There were numerous German villages all along the north shore of the Black Sea.

The Schoolmaster's Report lists several people coming from Alsace and none from the Pfalz, but the census of 1816 indicates that several individuals came from the Pfalz. This confusion is the result of France having annexed the Pfalz west of the Rhine River before 1809; it was considered French territory. Then, too, the villages from which these immigrants came are within 30 to 40 miles of the current Alsace French border.

Names of Colonists included Heinrich Ackermann, Ludwig Bachmann, Philipp Bohler (Boehler), Johann Bonekemper, Nikolaus Ehli (later spelled Ehly), Abraham Gemar, Konrad Herzel, Heinrich Hoffmann, Dietrich Huber, Valentin Hust, Frederick Klein, Johann Klundt, Johann Krieger, Andreas Rauscher, Andreas Reichert, Georg Riedinger, Georg Schneider, Jakob Schneider, Frederick Schwartz, Georg Trautmann, Dietrich Weikum, Daniel Peter Wiest, and Jakob and Karl Zimpelmann (also spelled Zimbelmann). Two of the original colonists were from Edenkoben and eight were from Rohrbach in the Pfalz.
