= Oksana Kushnir =

Kushnir Oksana
- Born: July 9, 1976 (age 49); Veselynove, Mykolaiv Oblast, Ukraine
- Education: Odessa Food Technology Academy
- Occupations: Businesswoman, Mountaineer
- Known for: First Cypriot woman to summit Mount Everest

Oksana Kushnir (born July 9, 1976, in Veselynove, Mykolaiv Oblast, Ukraine) is a Cypriot entrepreneur, investor and mountaineer of Ukrainian heritage. She is the first Cypriot woman to summit Mount Everest.

== Biography ==
Oksana Kushnir was born July 9, 1976, in Veselynove, Mykolaiv Oblast, Ukraine. She graduated from the Odesa Food Technology Academy in Ukraine in 2003. Kushnir has worked in various sectors, including real estate, renewable energy, and hospitality. She has been involved in real estate development and investment, managing and overseeing projects in Ukraine, Cyprus, Lithuania, Latvia, and Hungary. In renewable energy, Kushnir invested in sustainable projects, primarily in Ukraine. She has also participated in the hospitality industry, investing in restaurant businesses and development projects. In 2015, Kushnir founded Koksiholding. Through her company, she has been involved in real estate and business development projects, primarily focused on the construction and development of real estate and business centers located in Ukraine, the Baltic countries, Cyprus, and Hungary. Her company also operates renewable energy facilities with a focus on sustainable energy projects in Ukraine.

Kushnir is married and has two children.

== Mountaineering ==
Kushnir became the first Cypriot woman to summit Mount Everest, the world's tallest mountain.

She has also climbed other peaks, including Lhotse (8,516 meters), Manaslu (8,163 meters), Elbrus (5,642 meters), Aconcagua (6,962 meters), Kilimanjaro (5,895 meters). Kushnir has participated in climbing expeditions under various programs, including the Seven Summits and Eight-Thousanders. Some of her notable climbs include Everest, Lhotse, Manaslu, Kilimanjaro, Aconcagua and Elbrus.
