= Volodymyrivka, Shchaslyvka starosta okruh, Domanivka settlement hromada, Voznesensk Raion, Mykolaiv Oblast =

Village in Mykolaiv Oblast, Ukraine

Volodymyrivka Володимирівка
- Village
- Location of Volodymyrivka in Mykolaiv Oblast Location of Novosvitlivka in Ukraine
- Coordinates: 47°49′48″N 30°59′18″E
- Country: Ukraine
- Oblast: Mykolaiv Oblast
- Raion: Voznesensk Raion
- Founded: 1922
- Elevation: 132 m (433 ft)

Population (2001)
  - Total: 431
- Time zone: UTC+2 (EET)
  - Summer (DST): UTC+3 (EEST)
- Postal code: 56415
- Area code: +380 5152

Volodymyrivka (Ukrainian: Володимирівка) is a village in Voznesensk Raion, Mykolaiv Oblast in Southern Ukraine. A part of Shchaslyvka Starostyn district, it belongs to Domanivka settlement hromada, one of the hromadas of Ukraine.

Until 18 July 2020, Volodymyrivka was located in Domanivka Raion. The raion was abolished in July 2020 as part of the administrative reform of Ukraine, which reduced the number of raions of Mykolaiv Oblast to four. The area of Domanivka Raion was merged into Voznesensk Raion.
