= Nikolai Kabak =

Nikolai Panteleyevich Kabak
- Николай Пантелеевич Кабак
- Born: 3 May 1904; Novopoltavka village, Yeniseysk Governorate, Russian Empire
- Died: 12 June 1979 (aged 75); Kyzyl, Soviet Union
- Military career
- Allegiance: Soviet Union
- Branch: Red Army
- Service years: 1938–1945
- Rank: Sergeant
- Unit: 89th Guards Rifle Division
- Conflicts: Battle of Lake Khasan; World War II; Winter War; Eastern Front; Battle of the Dnieper
- Awards: Hero of the Soviet Union

Nikolai Panteleyevich Kabak (Russian: Николай Пантелеевич Кабак; 3 May 1904 – 27 June 1979) was a Red Army sergeant and Hero of the Soviet Union. He was awarded the title for ferrying troops and equipment during the Battle of the Dnieper in October 1943. Postwar, Kabak was chairman of the local village council and worked for a brick factory and a shipping company.

== Early life ==
Kabak was born on 3 May 1904 in the village of Novopoltavka in Yeniseysk Governorate to a peasant family. He graduated from fourth grade at a rural school. He worked as a forest ranger and chief of the forest section in a Krasnoyarsk glassworks. He later became the purchaser for the Yermakovsky Consumer's Union. In 1938 he was drafted into the Red Army and fought in the Battle of Lake Khasan and the Winter War.

== World War II ==
Kabak was drafted into the Red Army in October 1941 and sent to the front. In 1943, he joined the Communist Party of the Soviet Union. Kabak became a squad leader in the 104th Guards Separate Sapper Battalion of the 89th Guards Rifle Division. He fought in the Battle of the Dnieper. During early October 1943, Kabak helped ferry 5 guns, 20 mortars, heavy machine guns and nine infantry battalions across the Dnieper near the Konoplyanka farm in Poltava Oblast. On 3 October, Kabak transported 23 wounded soldiers across the Dnieper with their weapons. For this action he received the Order of the Red Banner on 17 October. On 20 December 1943, Kabak was awarded the title Hero of the Soviet Union and the Order of Lenin for his actions. In the summer of 1945, Kabak fought in the Soviet invasion of Manchuria.

== Postwar ==
In 1945 Kabak was discharged from the military. He worked as chairman of the Nizhnesuetuksky Village Council in the Yermakovsky District. From 1955 he worked in a brick factory in Kyzyl and later worked for the Yenisei Shipping Company in Kyzyl. Kabak died on 12 June 1979 and was buried in Kyzyl.
