= Kuznetsove =

Kuznetsove Кузнецове
- Country: Ukraine
- Raion: Voznesensk Raion
- Oblast: Mykolaiv Oblast
- Established: 1870

Population (2001)
  - Total: 706
- Postal code: 56418
- Area code: 5152

Kuznetsove is a village in Voznesensk Raion (district) of Mykolaiv Oblast, Ukraine. It founded in 1870, the population is 706.

== Demographics ==
According to the 2001 Ukrainian Census, 706 people lived in the village.

Language	Percentage
Ukrainian	94.62 %
Romanian	3.12 %
Russian	1.98 %
Other	0.29 %
