= Joseph Kessler =

Joseph Kessler may refer to:

- Josef Alois Kessler (1862–1933), Roman Catholic archbishop
- Joseph Christoph Kessler (1800–1872), German pianist and composer
