= Stepove, Stepove rural hromada, Mykolaiv Raion, Mykolaiv Oblast =

Rural locality in Mykolaiv Oblast, Ukraine

Stepove Степове
- Village
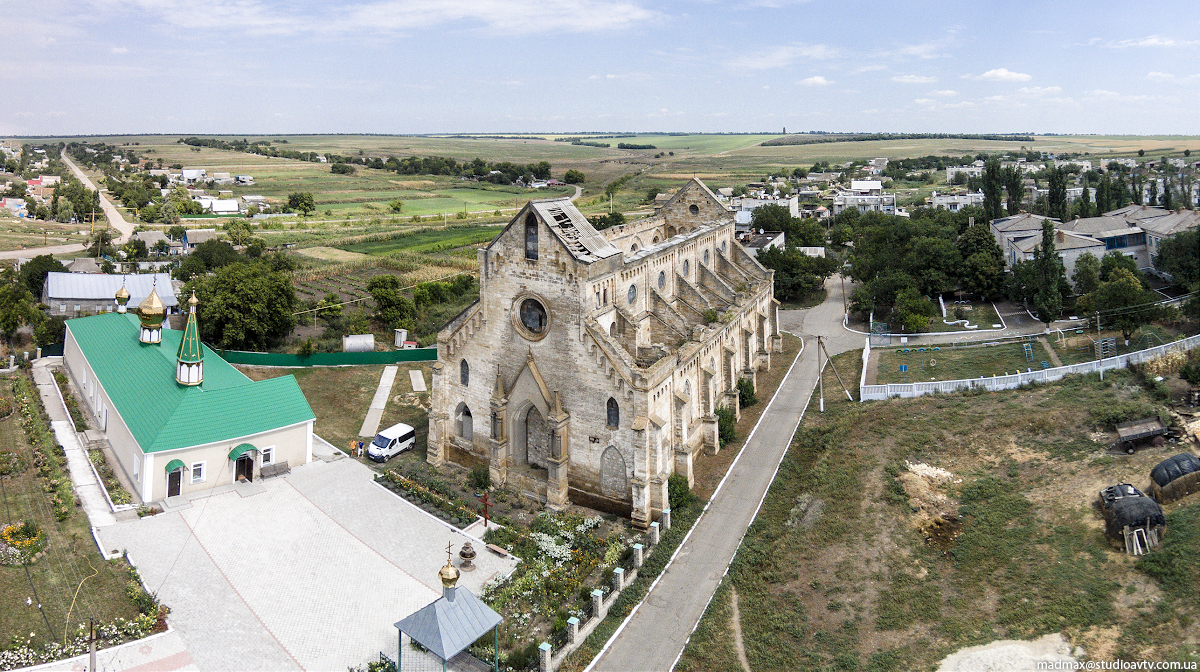

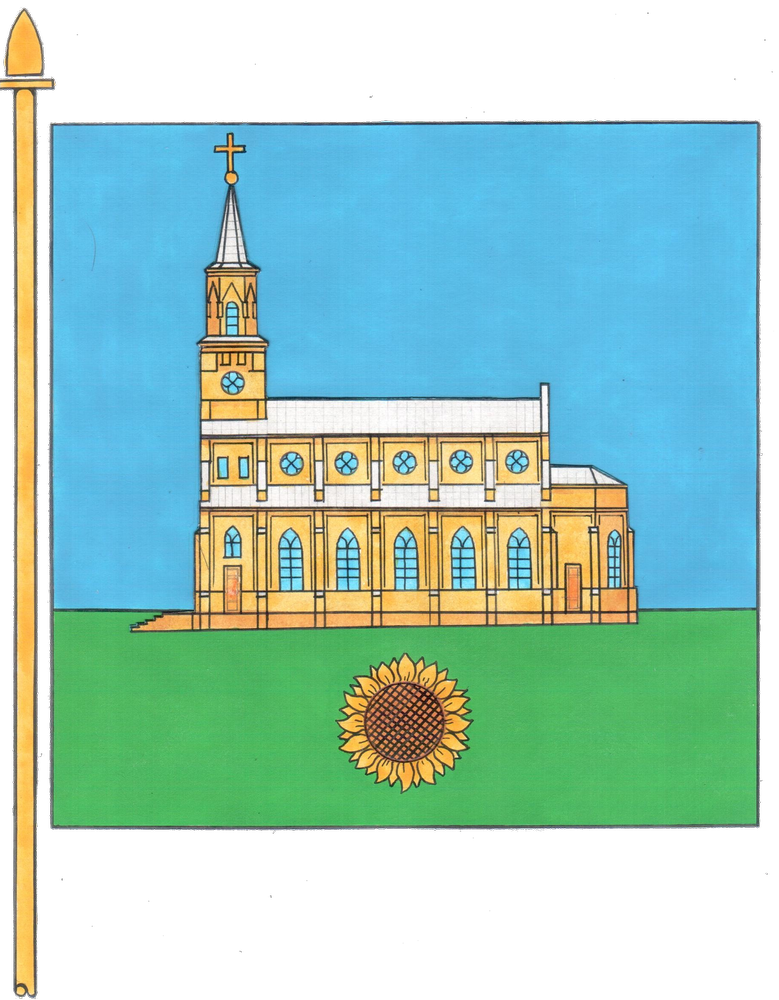
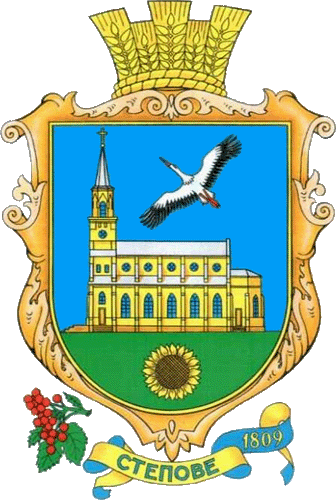
- Flag Coat of arms

- Location of Stepove in Mykolaiv Oblast Stepove (Ukraine)
- Coordinates: 47°11′04″N 31°31′12″E
- Country: Ukraine
- Oblast: Mykolaiv Oblast
- District: Mykolaiv Raion
- Community: Stepove rural council
- Founded: 1809
- Former name: Karlsruhe (1809—1944)

Area
  - Total: 85.116 km^{2} (32.863 sq mi)

Population (2001)
  - Total: 1,869
  - Density: 21.96/km^{2} (56.87/sq mi)
- Time zone: UTC+2 (EET)
  - Summer (DST): UTC+3 (EEST)
- Postal code: 57107
- Area code: +380 512
- Climate: Dfa
- Website: http://rada.gov.ua/

Stepove (Ukrainian: Степове) is a village in Mykolaiv Raion, Mykolaiv Oblast in Southern Ukraine. Its population was 1869 in the 2001 Ukrainian Census. Along with another village of Zelenyi Hai, it forms a rural community: Stepivska Silska Rada. Stepove hosts the administration of Stepove rural hromada, one of the hromadas of Ukraine.

== History ==
The village was founded as Karlsruhe (after Karlsruhe, Germany) in 1809 by Catholic Germans. The settlement was part of the Beresan Colonial District of Odessa region, Kherson Governorate. In 1886, the population of the German colony of Karlsruhe was 2,132 people; at which time it was part of the Landau parish, Odessa district, Kherson Governorate. There were 190 farmsteads, a Roman Catholic church, and a high school. The Roman Catholic Church of St. Peter and Paul was designed by the architect Korfu (Corfu) and was constructed from 1881 to 1885.

In 1925–1939, the Karlsruhe colony was part of Karl-Liebknechtovsky's German National District of Mykolaiv region (from Odessa Oblast since 1932).

Today, the ruins of the 19th-century neo-gothic style Roman Catholic church still remain. It is somewhat bricked up and its wooden roof and original steeple are gone. Several pictures of the church dated from the 1930s and 40s were published in a German language book called “Die Kirchen und das Religiöse Leben der Russlanddeutsche”. Pictures from 1942 and 1943 show the steeple missing the peak and cross but still with the stone base. The steeple was destroyed by the Soviets as they removed crosses from churches all over Ukraine. It is reported that the steeple was destroyed in 1934. It was rebuilt during the German occupation and destroyed yet again when Soviet forces advanced in mid-1944. Today, the main stone body of the steeple is completely gone. The church could have been battle damaged during the Nazi's advance through the area in 1941 or their retreat a few years later. Battle damage is present on its exterior from small-arms fire and shrapnel from undated events.

== See also ==
- Beresan Colony of the Black Sea Germans
- History of German settlement in Central and Eastern Europe
- Karlsruhe, North Dakota, settled by German Russians from the Beresan District
- Sulz, Ukraine, an abandoned village, once part of the same Beresan Colony
