= Hradivka, Mykolaiv Oblast =

Village in Mykolaiv Oblast, Ukraine

Hradivka Градівка
- Village
- Location of Hradivka in Mykolaiv Oblast Location of Hradivka in Ukraine
- Coordinates: 47°23′21″N 31°4′50″E
- Country: Ukraine
- Oblast: Mykolaiv Oblast
- Raion: Voznesensk Raion
- Founded: 1810
- Elevation: 20 m (66 ft)

Population (2001)
  - Total: 546
- Time zone: UTC+2 (EET)
  - Summer (DST): UTC+3 (EEST)
- Postal code: 57012
- Area code: +380 5163

Hradivka (Ukrainian: Градівка) is a village in Voznesensk Raion, Mykolaiv Oblast, Ukraine. It belongs to Veselynove settlement hromada, one of the hromadas of Ukraine. During the 19th and early 20th century, the village was known as München.

== Geography ==
Hradivka lies on the Chychyklia River. It is 3 km from the village of Porichchya, 8 km from the village of Mostove, and 36 km from Voznesens'k.

== History ==
=== Population ===
- 1811: 208
- 1817: 228
- 1828: 277
- 1859: 713
- 1881: 1,128
- 1885: 1,175
- 1890: 1,446
- 1894: 1,434
- 1900: 1,928
- 1914: 1,828
- 1926: 1,172
- 1942: 1,200

=== German colonist era ===
The village was settled in spring of 1810 by ethnic German colonists at the invitation of Alexander I of Russia. The village had evidence of prior settlement in the form of stone foundations and pottery when the German colonists arrived. The colonist Heinrich Adler named the village München (Munich), after his birthplace, the capital of Bavaria, although he did not stay long as a resident. In the 1811 census of the village, the colony had a population of 208 people, belonging 48 Catholic families and 8 Lutheran families.

=== Modern era ===
Until 18 July 2020, Hradivka belonged to Veselynove Raion. In July 2020, as part of the administrative reform of Ukraine, which reduced the number of raions of Mykolaiv Oblast to four, Veselynove Raion was merged into Voznesensk Raion.

== Religion ==
From the 1810 settlement until after the Second World War, most of the residents of the village spoke German day to day, and the dominant religion in the village was Roman Catholicism. Due to proximity, the Catholic residents of München belonged to the Catholic parish in the neighboring village of Rastadt (Porichchya) in the earlier years.

A Catholic church was built in München in 1872. It was built of quarried stone, 130 feet long and 45 feet wide, with a tower 56 feet high. The church was consecrated by Bishop Zerr on 27 May 1890 and was dedicated to St. Nicolaus.
