= Bratske Raion =

Former subdivision of Mykolaiv Oblast, Ukraine

Bratske Raion Братський район
- Raion
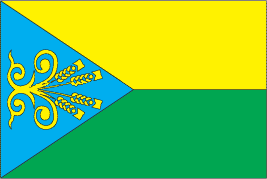
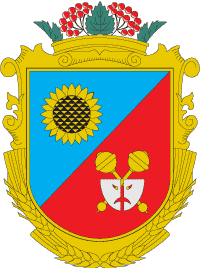
- Flag Coat of arms

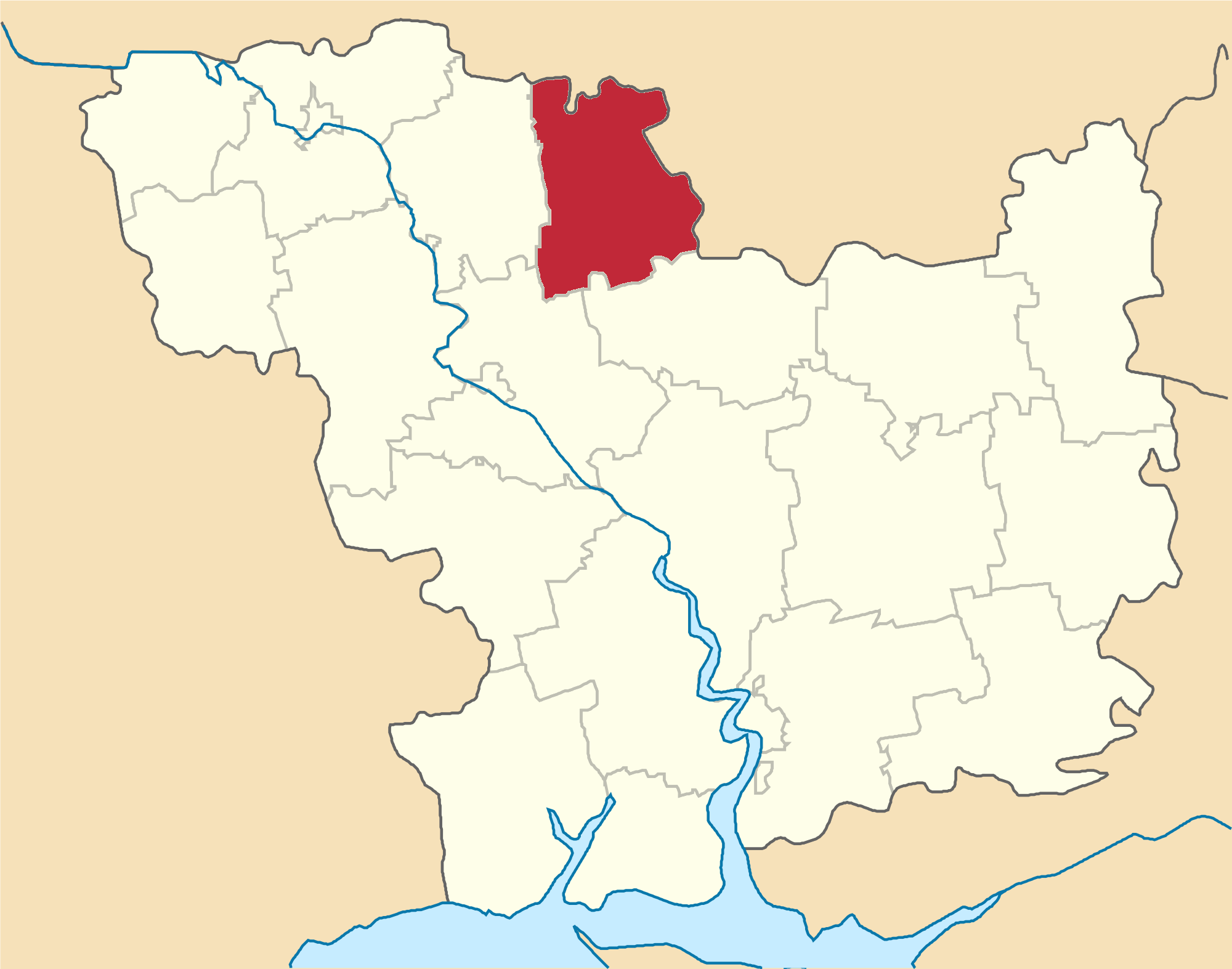
- Coordinates: 47°55′11″N 31°37′26″E
- Country: Ukraine
- Oblast: Mykolaiv Oblast
- Established: 1923
- Disestablished: 18 July 2020
- Admin. center: Bratske
- Subdivisions: List: 0 — city councils; 1 — settlement councils; 15 — rural councils; Number of localities: 0 — cities; 1 — urban-type settlements; 58 — villages; 1 — rural settlements

Government
  - Governor: Tetyana Pidborska

Area
  - Total: 1,100 km^{2} (420 sq mi)

Population (2020)
  - Total: 17,129 ▼
  - Density: 16/km^{2} (40/sq mi)
- Time zone: UTC+02:00 (EET)
  - Summer (DST): UTC+03:00 (EEST)
- Postal index: 55400—55485
- Area code: +380 5131
- Website: http://bratske.mk.gov.ua

Bratske Raion (Ukrainian: Братський район) was a subdivision of Mykolaiv Oblast of Ukraine. Its administrative center was the urban-type settlement of Bratske. The raion was abolished on 18 July 2020 as part of the administrative reform of Ukraine, which reduced the number of raions of Mykolaiv Oblast to four. The area of Bratske Raion was merged into Voznesensk Raion. The last estimate of the raion population was 17,129 (2020 est.)

== History ==
In the beginning of the 19th century, the current area of the district belonged to Yelisavetgradsky Uyezd of Kherson Governorate. In 1828, Yelisavetgradsky Uyezd was merged with Olviopolsky Uyezd into Bobrinetsky Uyezd. In 1865, the administrative center of Bobrinetsky Uyezd was moved to Yelisavetgrad, and the uyezd was renamed Yelisavetgradsky. On 16 April 1920, Kherson Governorate was renamed Nikolayev Governorate, and on 21 October 1922, it was merged into Odessa Governorate. In 1923, uyezds in Ukrainian Soviet Socialist Republic were abolished, and the governorates were divided into okruhas. In 1923, Bratske Raion with the administrative center located in Bratske was established. It belonged to Lyzavethrad Okruha (in 1924 renamed Zinovievsk Okruha). In 1925, the governorates were abolished, and okruhas were directly subordinated to Ukrainian SSR. In 1930, okruhas were abolished, and on 27 February 1932, Odessa Oblast was established, and Bratske Raion was included into Odessa Oblast. In 1944, Bratske Raion was transferred to Mykolaiv Oblast.

== Subdivisions ==
At the time of disestablishment, the raion consisted of two hromadas,

- Bratske settlement hromada with the administration in Bratske;
- Novomarivka rural hromada with the administration in the selo of Novomarivka.
