= Sulz, Ukraine =

Village in Mykolaiv Oblast, Ukraine

Coordinates: 47.0925000°N 31.4900000°E

Sulz (Ukrainian or Russian: Шульцово, Shultsovo) was a village in Mykolaiv Raion of Mykolaiv Oblast in southern Ukraine. It was located along the east bank of the Berezan River just to the southeast of the village of Landau.

The village was established in 1809 by Roman Catholic German immigrants to the Berezaner Valley, then part of the Kherson Governorate of the Russian Empire. It was abandoned after the remaining German residents were driven from the area by the advancing Soviet army in 1944.

== See also ==
- Black Sea Germans
- German evacuation from Central and Eastern Europe
- Josef Alois Kessler
- Shyrokolanivka
- Stepove, Mykolaiv Raion
