= Berezan Estuary =

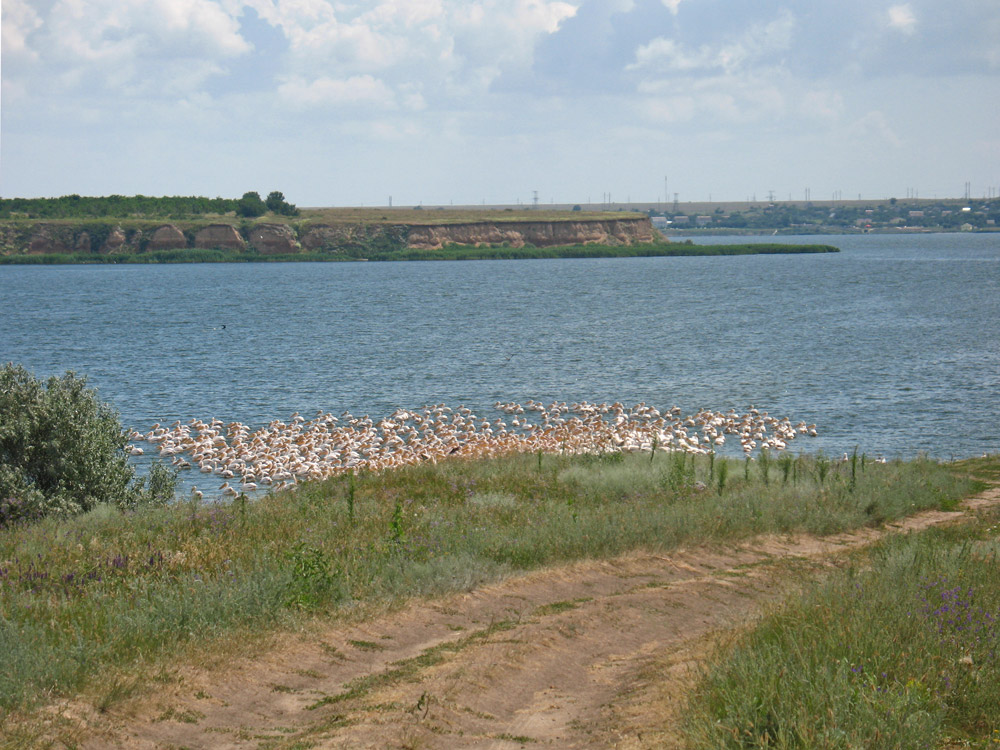

- Location within Ukraine
- Location: Black Sea
- Coordinates: 46°42′N 31°30′E
- River sources: Berezan River, Sasyk River
- Ocean/sea sources: Atlantic Ocean
- Basin countries: Ukraine
- Max. length: 26 km (16 mi)
- Max. width: 0.6–4 km (0.37–2.49 mi)
- Surface area: 60 km^{2} (23 sq mi)
- Average depth: 3.3 m (11 ft)
- Max. depth: 15 m (49 ft)
- Water volume: 0.2 km^{3} (0.048 cu mi)
- Settlements: Ochakiv

The Berezan Estuary, or Berezanskyi Liman (Ukrainian: Березанський лиман, Turkish: Büzülu liman), is an open estuary on the northern coast of the Black Sea, western from the town Ochakiv. In length of 26 km, and 4 km-wide in south, it is separated from the sea by sandbar, which has a 640-meter canal. Its coasts are high. Two rivers, Berezan and Sasyk, inflow into the estuary.

== See also ==
- Dniester Estuary
- Small Adzhalyk Estuary
- Khadzhibey Estuary
- Tylihul Estuary
- Sukhyi Estuary
