= Volodymyrivka, Holovanivsk Raion, Kirovohrad Oblast =

Rural locality in Kirovohrad Oblast, Ukraine

Volodymyrivka Володимирівка
- Village
- Location within Ukraine Kirovohrad Oblast Location within Ukraine
- Coordinates: 48°34′14″N 30°43′53″E
- Country: Ukraine
- Oblast: Kirovohrad Oblast
- Raion: Holovanivsk Raion
- Hromada: Pidvysoke rural hromada
- Elevation: 104 m (341 ft)

Population (2001 census)
  - Total: 118
- Time zone: UTC+2 (EET)
  - Summer (DST): UTC+3 (EEST)
- Postal code: 26122
- Area code: +380 5255

Volodymyrivka (Ukrainian: Володимирівка) is a village in Holovanivsk Raion of Kirovohrad Oblast, Ukraine. It belongs to Pidvysoke rural hromada, one of the hromadas of Ukraine.

== History ==
A major archaeological site of the Neolithic Trypillia culture is located in the village. Throughout its existence, the settlement was very large, covering an area of 100 hectares. This proto-city is just one of 2,440 Cucuteni-Trypillia settlements discovered so far in Moldova and Ukraine. 194 (8%) of these settlements had an area of more than 10 hectares between 5000 and 2700 BC and more than 29 settlements had an area in the range of 100 to 450 hectares.

Until 18 July 2020, Volodymyrivka belonged to Novoarkhanhelsk Raion. The raion was abolished in July 2020 as part of the administrative reform of Ukraine, which reduced the number of raions of Kirovohrad Oblast to four. The area of Novoarkhanhelsk Raion was merged into Holovanivsk Raion.

== Demographics ==
According to the 1989 census, the population of the village was 196 people, of whom 81 were men and 115 were women. According to the 2001 census of Ukraine, 118 people lived in the village.

=== Languages ===
Native language as of the Ukrainian Census of 2001:

Language	Percentage
Ukrainian	93.22 %
Moldovan (Romanian)	5.54 %
Russian	0.85 %
