= Ukrainka, Seryshevsky District, Amur Oblast =

Ukrainka Украинка
- Selo
- Location within Amur Oblast Location within Russia
- Coordinates: 51°08′N 128°30′E
- Country: Russia
- Region: Amur Oblast
- District: Seryshevsky District
- Time zone: UTC+9:00

Ukrainka (Russian: Украинка) is a rural locality (a selo) and the administrative center of Ukrainsky Selsoviet of Seryshevsky District, Amur Oblast, Russia. The population was 1,160 as of 2018. There are 6 streets.

== Geography ==
Ukrainka is located 14 km northeast of Seryshevo (the district's administrative centre) by road. Belonogovo is the nearest rural locality.
