= Josef Alois Kessler =

Catholic archbishop (1862–1933)

Joseph Aloysius Kessler
- Archbishop
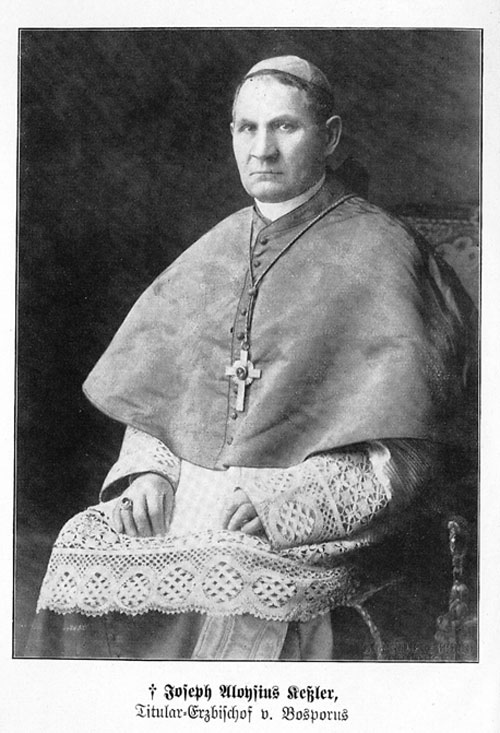
- Church: Roman Catholic Church
- See: Roman Catholic Diocese of Tiraspol (Russia)
- In office: 1904-1918
- Predecessor: Eduard Baron von der Ropp
- Successor: none
- Previous post(s): Priest

Orders
- Ordination: 1889

Personal details
- Born: August 12, 1862; Louis (Ostrogovka), Russia
- Died: December 10, 1933 (aged 71); Zinnowitz, Germany

Joseph Aloysius Kessler (German: Josef Alois Kessler, Russian: Иосиф Алоиз Кесслер; August 12, 1862 – December 10, 1933) was the last bishop of the Diocese of Tiraspol in Russia and the last Volga German bishop until Bishop Joseph Werth, SJ.

== Biography ==
Joseph Kessler was born 12 August 1862 in Louis (Ostrogovka) Government Samara. After he finished his studies in the Saratov Seminary, he was ordained in 1889. He graduated from Roman Catholic Theological Academy in St. Petersburg with a degree of Master of Theology. In 1889, he became a vicar of a parish in Saratov, and at the same time he taught in the Saratov Seminary. After that, his life entered a period of transition. He took the following positions during the next 13 years: 1892 Simferopol parish vicar, 1895 Sulz parish priest, 1899 Chişinău (today Moldova) parish priest, 1903 Saratov Seminary inspector, and in 1904 canon lawyer. He was appointed Bishop of Tiraspol on 1 April 1904. He was consecrated the 5th Bishop of the Diocese of Tiraspol on 28 October 1904 and took residence in the diocesan headquarters in Saratov. While Josef Kessler was Bishop of Tiraspol, the pastoral life of the diocese became successful and vital. Bishop Kessler expanded the seminary, founded a publishing house, supported the work of male and female religious orders, visited all parishes of the giant diocese, and conducted 75,000 confirmations.

On 14 August 1918, before the Bolsheviks captured Saratov during the Russian Civil War, Bishop Kessler fled the city on foot, and went to Odessa. When the Soviet secret police, or CHEKA, searched the seminary, they found a message from the Bishop, where he declared the power of the Bolsheviks to be the power of Antichrist. The message further warned local Catholics that, if they cooperated in any way with Soviet power, they would be excommunicated. In response, the CHEKA conducted a Russia-wide manhunt for Bishop Kessler. The Bishop secretly left Russia for Bessarabia (today divided between Moldova and Ukraine), where he was a priest in the village of Krasne near Tarutino. In 1921, he visited Kansas and made a trip throughout the United States to raise funds for the famine-stricken Volga German and Black Sea German farming colonies. The rest of his life was spent in the Weimar Republic, at Zinnowitz on the Baltic Sea.

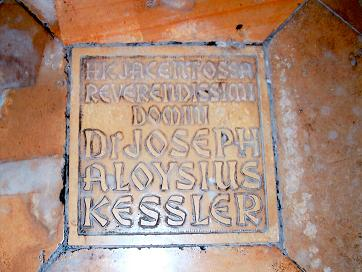
Grave stone of Josef Kessler in Ornbau, Germany

He died on 10 December 1933 and was buried in Ornbau, Bavaria, next to another Bishop of Tiraspol, Franz Zottmann, who was born in Ornbau.
