= Novopoltavka =

Village in Mykolaiv Oblast, Ukraine

Novopoltavka Новополтавка
- Village
- Location within Ukraine Location within Mykolaiv Oblast
- Coordinates: 47°32′54″N 32°30′04″E
- Country: Ukraine
- Oblast: Mykolaiv Oblast
- Raion: Bashtanka Raion
- Hromada: Vilne Zaporizhzhia rural hromada
- Administrative Classification: KOATUU: 4824582601

Area
  - Total: 1.68 km^{2} (0.65 sq mi)
- Elevation: 82 m (269 ft)

Population (21 October 2011)
  - Total: 1,115
  - Density: 663.69/km^{2} (1,718.9/sq mi)
- Time zone: UTC+2 (EET)
  - Summer (DST): UTC+3 (EEST)
- Postal code: 55642
- Area code: +380 5151

Novopoltavka (Ukrainian: Новополтавка) – is a village in Ukraine. It is part of the Mykolaiv Oblast. Its local government is the Novopoltavska Village Council. It is located 20 km south of the district center Novyi Buh.

== History ==
Novopoltavka was established in 1840.

As of 1886, a colony of Jews from somewhere in the Kherson Oblast inhabited the village. There were 120 farms, two synagogues, schools and shops.

During World War II, 227 villagers fought the Nazi invaders, 78 of which were killed. 146 were decorated with government awards. In September 1941, The Nazis shot 837 people in the village.

== Economy ==
The village possesses 4524 hectares of agricultural land, including 3475 hectares of rich, unused land. Winter wheat, barley, maize, sunflowers and sugar beets are all products of the village. The village also specializes in fattening cattle.

== See also ==
- Russian invasion of Ukraine
