= Veselynove =

Rural locality in Mykolaiv Oblast, Ukraine

Veselynove Веселинове
- Rural settlement
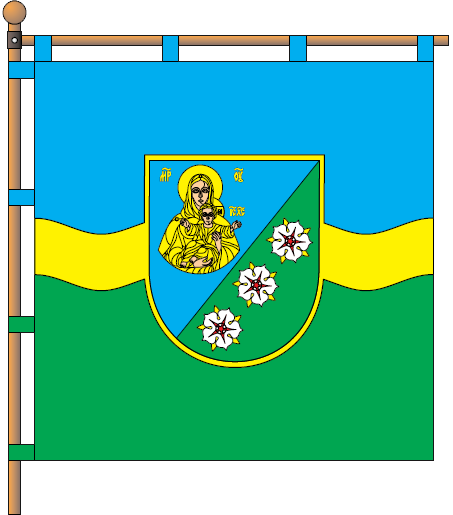
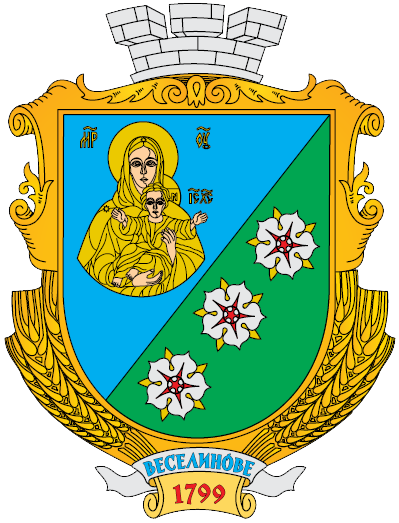
- Flag Coat of arms

- Location of Veselynove Veselynove (Ukraine)
- Coordinates: 47°21′N 31°14′E
- Country: Ukraine
- Oblast: Mykolaiv Oblast
- Raion: Voznesensk Raion

Population (2022)
  - Total: 5,566
- Time zone: UTC+2 (EET)
  - Summer (DST): UTC+3 (EEST)

Veselynove (Ukrainian: Веселинове; Russian: Веселиново) is a rural settlement in Voznesensk Raion of Mykolaiv Oblast in southern Ukraine. It is located in the Chychyklia. Veselynove hosts the administration of Veselynove settlement hromada, one of the hromadas of Ukraine. Population: 5,566 (2022 estimate).

== History ==
Veselynove was settled in the end of the 18th century and got its name from the landowner Veselinov. Since the beginning of the 19th century, it belonged to Kherson Governorate, after 1834 to Ananyevsky Uyezd. In January 1918, Veselynove became a center of a volost. On 16 April 1920, Odessa Governorate split off, and the area was moved to Voznesensky Uyezd of Odessa Governorate. In 1923, uyezds in Ukrainian Soviet Socialist Republic were abolished, and the governorates were divided into okruhas. In 1930, okruhas were abolished, and on 27 February 1932, Odessa Oblast was established, and Veselynove was included into Odessa Oblast.

Veselynove Raion with the administrative center in Veselynove was established in 1939 and belonged to Odessa Oblast. In 1944, Veselynove Raion was transferred to Mykolaiv Oblast. In 1960, Veselynove was granted urban-type settlement status. In 1963, during the abortive Khrushchyov administrative reform, the raion was abolished. In 1965, it was re-established.

On 18 July 2020, Veselynove Raion was abolished as part of the administrative reform of Ukraine, which reduced the number of raions of Mykolaiv Oblast to four. The area of Veselynove Raion was merged into Voznesensk Raion. On 26 January 2024, a new law entered into force which abolished the status of urban-type settlement status, and Veselynove became a rural settlement.
