= Bratske =

Rural locality in Mykolaiv Oblast, Ukraine

Bratske Братське
- Rural settlement
- Location within Mykolaiv Oblast Location within Ukraine
- Coordinates: 47°51′58″N 31°34′24″E
- Country: Ukraine
- Oblast: Mykolaiv Oblast
- Raion: Voznesensk Raion

Population (2022)
  - Total: 4,953
- Time zone: UTC+2 (EET)
  - Summer (DST): UTC+3 (EEST)

Bratske (Ukrainian: Братське, Russian: Бра́тское) is a rural settlement in Voznesensk Raion in the north of Mykolaiv Oblast, Ukraine. It hosts the administration of Bratske settlement hromada, one of the hromadas of Ukraine. Population: 4,953 (2022 estimate).

Bratske is located on the banks of the Mertvovid, a right tributary of the Southern Bug.

== History ==
Bratske was founded by Zaporozhian Cossacks in the 18th century. In the 1860s, it belonged to Yelisavetgradsky Uyezd of Kherson Governorate On 16 April 1920, Kherson Governorate was renamed Nikolayev Governorate, and on 21 October 1922, it was merged into Odessa Governorate. In 1923, uyezds in Ukrainian Soviet Socialist Republic were abolished, and the governorates were divided into okruhas. In 1923, Bratske Raion with the administrative center located in Bratske was established. It belonged to Lyzavethrad Okruha (in 1924 renamed Zinovievsk Okruha). In 1925, the governorates were abolished, and okruhas were directly subordinated to Ukrainian SSR. In 1930, okruhas were abolished, and on 27 February 1932, Odessa Oblast was established, and Bratske Raion was included into Odessa Oblast. In 1944, Bratske Raion was transferred to Mykolaiv Oblast. In 1956, Bratske was granted urban-type settlement status.

On 18 July 2020, Bratske Raion was abolished as part of the administrative reform of Ukraine, which reduced the number of raions of Mykolaiv Oblast to four. The area of Bratske Raion was merged into Voznesensk Raion. On 26 January 2024, a new law entered into force which abolished the status of urban-type settlement status, and Bratske became a rural settlement.

== Demographics ==
As of the 2001 Ukrainian census, Bratske had a population of 6,148 inhabitants. The linguistic composition of the population was as follows:

Native languages in Bratske
	percent
Ukrainian	94.9%
Russian	4.1%
Romanian	0.6%
Armenian	0.1%
Bulgarian	0.1%
others	0.1%

== Economy ==
=== Transportation ===
The closest railway station, about 25 kilometres (16 mi) northwest of the settlement, is in Liudmilivka, on the railway line connecting Odessa and Pomichna.
