= Jennifer Berezan =

Canadian musician, producer, and activist

Jennifer Berezan (born January 19, 1961) is a Canadian singer-songwriter, producer, and activist. A native of Alberta, she has released ten albums, which explore themes in environmental, women's, and other justice movements. Her work spans several musical genres and often includes other artists, and large-scale multicultural events. Berezan's 1993 album, Borderlines, was nominated for a NAIRD Award for independent music.

== Life and career ==
=== Origins and musical beginnings ===
Berezan was born in Edmonton, Alberta. When she was in second grade, a woman selling guitar lessons gave her an aptitude test and convinced Berezan's parents that she had musical ability. Her parents enrolled her in guitar lessons. Her first musical influence was the 1950s music of her parents and later the music that played from her radio in the 1960s. In her teenage years, she began to write music "as an outlet for the emotional stuff that was going on in my life."

Attending a progressive Catholic high School, her religion classes included discussions of music such as Simon & Garfunkel's "I Am a Rock" and this sort of introspective music influenced her. In 1978, in her senior year in high school, an English teacher introduced her to the music of Bob Dylan. Her discovery of Dylan, led her to rediscover the "60s experience through the music." Canadian folk music at that time had its own set of introspective folk singers, such as Joni Mitchell, (also from Alberta), Neil Young, Ferron, Bruce Cockburn, The Band, Heather Bishop and Connie Kaldor, each of whom influenced her music.

Berezan studied comparative religion at the University of Calgary. After her first year, she took a break to travel in Europe and had her first experience of playing in public on the street corners of France and Germany. She completed her degree at the University of Calgary while playing in her spare time at clubs and cafes throughout Alberta. During this period, she discovered feminism and liberation theology and began playing at political events. She also became interested in the treatment of women by the major religions in patriarchal societies. She became involved in a number of groups working for justice in Latin America and other solidarity movements, anti nuclear efforts, and feminist causes.

Berezan moved to Oakland in 1986 to take a master's degree at the Institute of Culture and Creation Spirituality at Holy Names College. The school, run by renegade Catholic priest Matthew Fox, had a staff that included Starhawk, Luisah Teish and Charlene Spretnak. In addition to academic study, the program included experiential learning, artistic spiritual practices and political consciousness-raising. in her second year there, Berezan began to make connections in the Bay Area music scene and began playing at local clubs and restaurants.

=== Musical career ===
Berezan's 1988 debut album In the Eye of The Storm was an early example of a musical style that has come to be called "Americana." Her more rock-oriented Borderlines was nominated for a 1993 NAIRD Award (the Grammy of the indie record industry). She Carries Me (1995) marked the beginning of Berezan’s journey into the realm of meditative and trance music. The album featured Olympia Dukakis in a spoken word part. Refuge (1997) combined acoustic arrangements with personal themes.

In 2000, Berezan released Returning, a cross-cultural work using chants. This was her first work to create a long playing, layered composition. It was recorded in Malta in a 6000-year-old temple with an oracular underground sound chamber. Praises for the World (2002), featured Alice Walker and singers from various cultural and spiritual traditions. It developed into a large-scale theatrical production with nearly 60 musicians, dancers, poets, actors and activists. Other guest artists included Gloria Steinem, Olympia Dukakis, Eve Ensler, Wilma Mankiller, and Tuck and Patti. The individual performances have been used for fundraisers and educational events for various causes.

The acoustic End of Desire, in 2005, showed Berezan's wide-ranging musical influences and interests. It included folk, rock, chant and pop with Buddhist themes, love songs, and works about the struggle for global justice. It includes vocal appearances by Bruce Cockburn and Emily Saliers of Indigo Girls.

In 2011, Berezan released In these Arms, A Song for all Beings, a long-playing musical meditation based on two of the Buddhist "sublime attitudes," loving kindness and compassion. In Korea, Berezan and co-producer Don Benedictson recorded 250 Buddhist nuns from Un-munsa monastery. The nun's chants are inter-mixed with voices from around the world, including Dechen Shak-Dagsay (Tibet), Rita Sahai (India), Katia Cardenal (Nicaragua), Buddhist teacher Jack Kornfield and others. Her recent release "Home" continues her mix of music and a collection of musical friends with themes that focus on "home as everywhere"—California, Beijing, the Yukon and the "internal realms of the heart."

In 2013 Berezan released the album Home. She co-produced it with Jon Evans (bass player with Tori Amos). And in 2023 she released Belonging. She co-produced it with Don Benedictson. It features her rousing anthem Plant a Tree and a reworking of her renowned song She Carries Me featuring guest artists sharing the verses-Chris Webster, Melanie DeMore, and Damond Moodie. The album also features Nicky Mehta(Wailin' Jennys) on backup vocals. A virtuosic band from Winnipeg creates the atmospheric sounds on the album including guitarist Murray Pulver (Crash Test Dummies).

== Musical style and reception ==
Berezan's work spans musical styles and crosses artistic boundaries, blurring the distinctions between music, politics, and spirituality. While her songs often confront universal issues, her perspective is personal and reflects her upbringing in the prairies of Alberta and the transformative power of nature. She is known as a producer of large scale multicultural ecstatic musical events. Her "sprawling multimedia happenings" have gained her a loyal following. These "Praises for the World," events may involve as many as sixty musicians, dancers, poets, actors, activists and spiritual leaders. The first such event orchestrated by her was held at the Scottish Rite Temple in Oakland, in 2000, "drawing hundreds of people to experience prayerful incantations and creative celebrations."

Larry Kelp, writing in the Oakland Tribune has compared Berezan's Borderlines (1993) to that of folk rock singer-songwriters ranging from Nanci Griffith to Shawn Colvin and says that none, "has come close to the overall quality of... Berezan's second album." Edmonton Journal music critic Roger Levesque, said of Berezan "Some artists are really able to encapsulate the thoughts or experiences of many." Stephen Ide, writing in Dirty Linen has called Berezan "a rising star on the folk scene with her keen observations of life, love, politics and injustice."

== Personal life ==
Berezan resides in Berkeley, California when not on tour. She teaches at the California Institute of Integral Studies in San Francisco in the department of Philosophy and Religion. Since 1997, she has taught a course entitled "the Healing Ecstasy of Sound" which explores music as a spiritual practice from cross cultural, traditional and contemporary perspectives.
