= Domanivka Raion =

Former subdivision of Mykolaiv Oblast, Ukraine

Domanivka Raion Доманівський район
- Raion
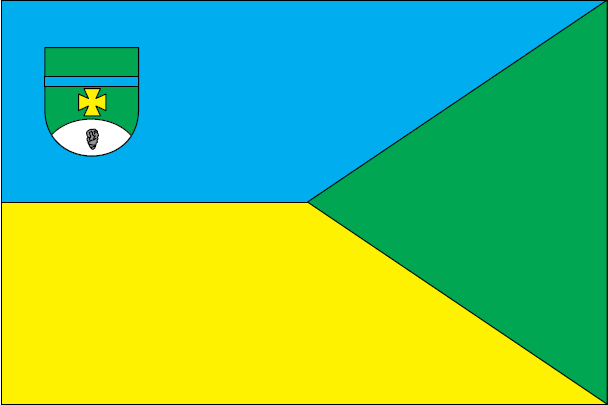
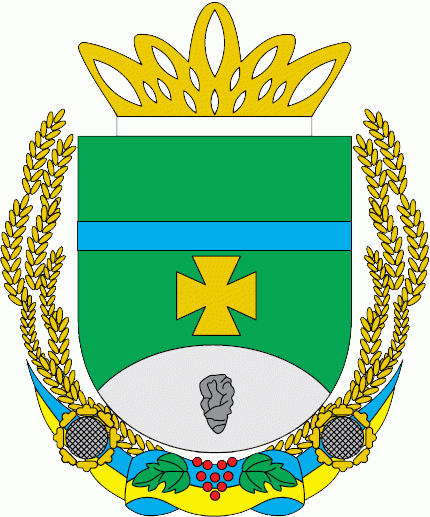
- Flag Coat of arms

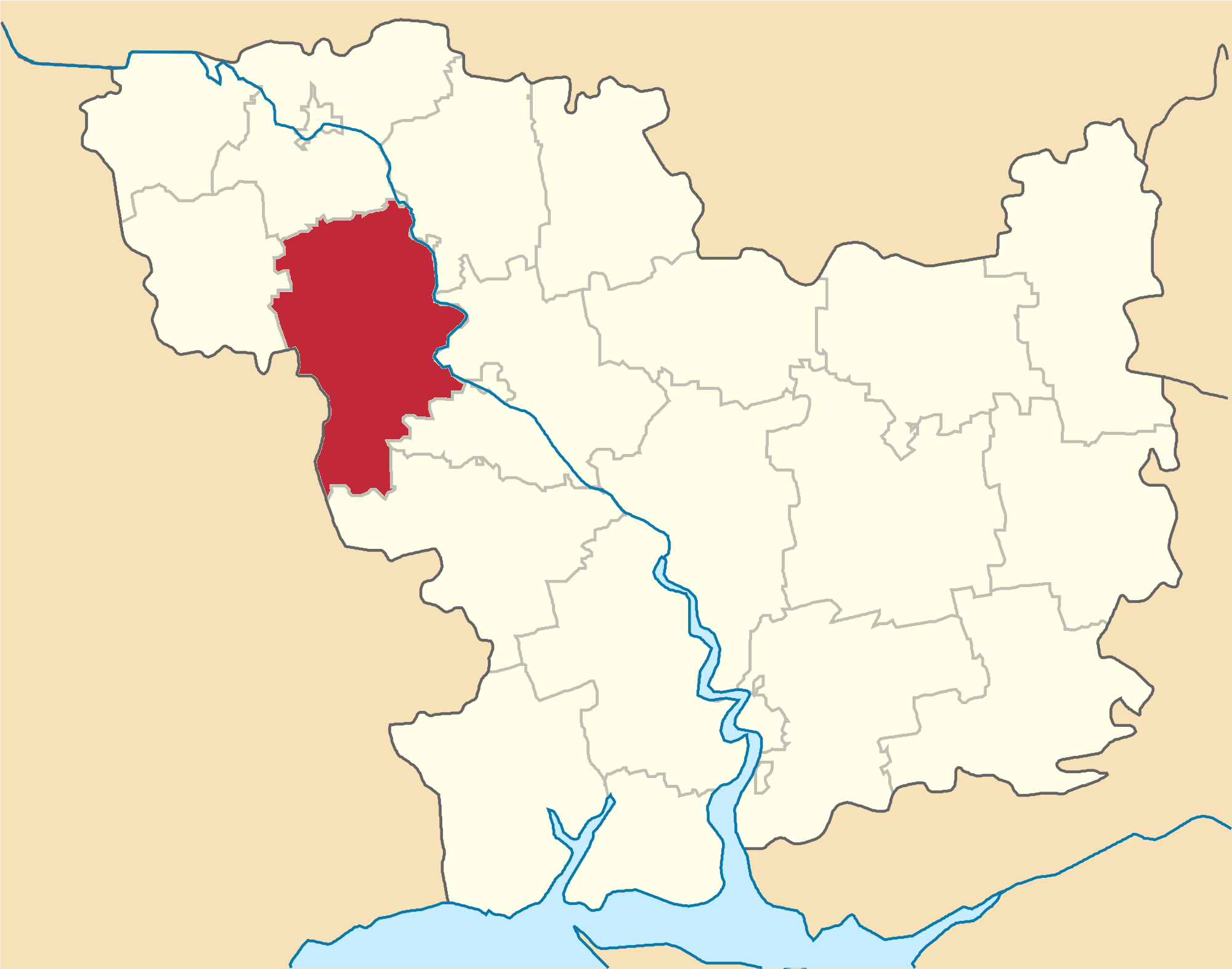
- Coordinates: 47°38′41″N 30°59′24″E
- Country: Ukraine
- Oblast: Mykolaiv Oblast
- Established: 1923
- Disestablished: 18 July 2020
- Admin. center: Domanivka
- Subdivisions: List: 0 — city councils; 1 — settlement councils; 13 — rural councils; Number of localities: 0 — cities; 1 — urban-type settlements; 61 — villages; 0 — rural settlements

Government
  - Governor: Taras Kushnir

Area
  - Total: 1,458 km^{2} (563 sq mi)

Population (2020)
  - Total: 24,447 ▼
  - Density: 16.77/km^{2} (43.43/sq mi)
- Time zone: UTC+02:00 (EET)
  - Summer (DST): UTC+03:00 (EEST)
- Postal index: 56400—56470
- Area code: +380 5152

Domanivka Raion (Ukrainian: Доманівський район) was a subdivision of Mykolaiv Oblast of Ukraine. Its administrative center was the urban-type settlement of Domanivka. The raion was abolished on 18 July 2020 as part of the administrative reform of Ukraine, which reduced the number of raions of Mykolaiv Oblast to four. The area of Domanivka Raion was merged into Voznesensk Raion. The last estimate of the raion population was 24,447 (2020 est.)

== History ==
In the 1920s, the current area of the district belonged to Odessa Governorate. In 1923, uyezds in Ukrainian Soviet Socialist Republic were abolished, and the governorates were divided into okruhas. In 1923, Kantakuzynka Raion with the administrative center in the selo of Kantakuzynka was established. It belonged to Pervomaisk Okruha. In 1925, the governorates were abolished, and okruhas were directly subordinated to Ukrainian SSR. On 3 February 1926, Katakuzynka Raion was renamed Domanivka Raion, and the center was moved to Domanivka. In 1930, okruhas were abolished, and on 27 February 1932, Odessa Oblast was established, and Domanivka Raion was included into Odessa Oblast. In February 1954, Domanivka Raion was transferred to Mykolaiv Oblast.

== Subdivisions ==
At the time of disestablishment, the raion consisted of three hromadas,

- Domanivka settlement hromada with the administration in Domanivka;
- Mostove rural hromada with the administration in the selo of Mostove;
- Prybuzhzhia rural hromada with the administration in the selo of Prybuzhzhia.

== People ==
- Maxim Grabovenko (1923-1980)
