= Veselynove Raion =

Former subdivision of Mykolaiv Oblast, Ukraine

Veselynove Raion Веселинівський район
- Raion
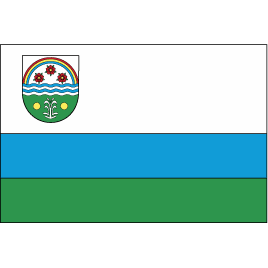
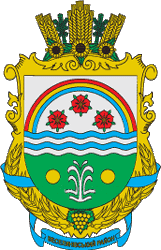
- Flag Coat of arms

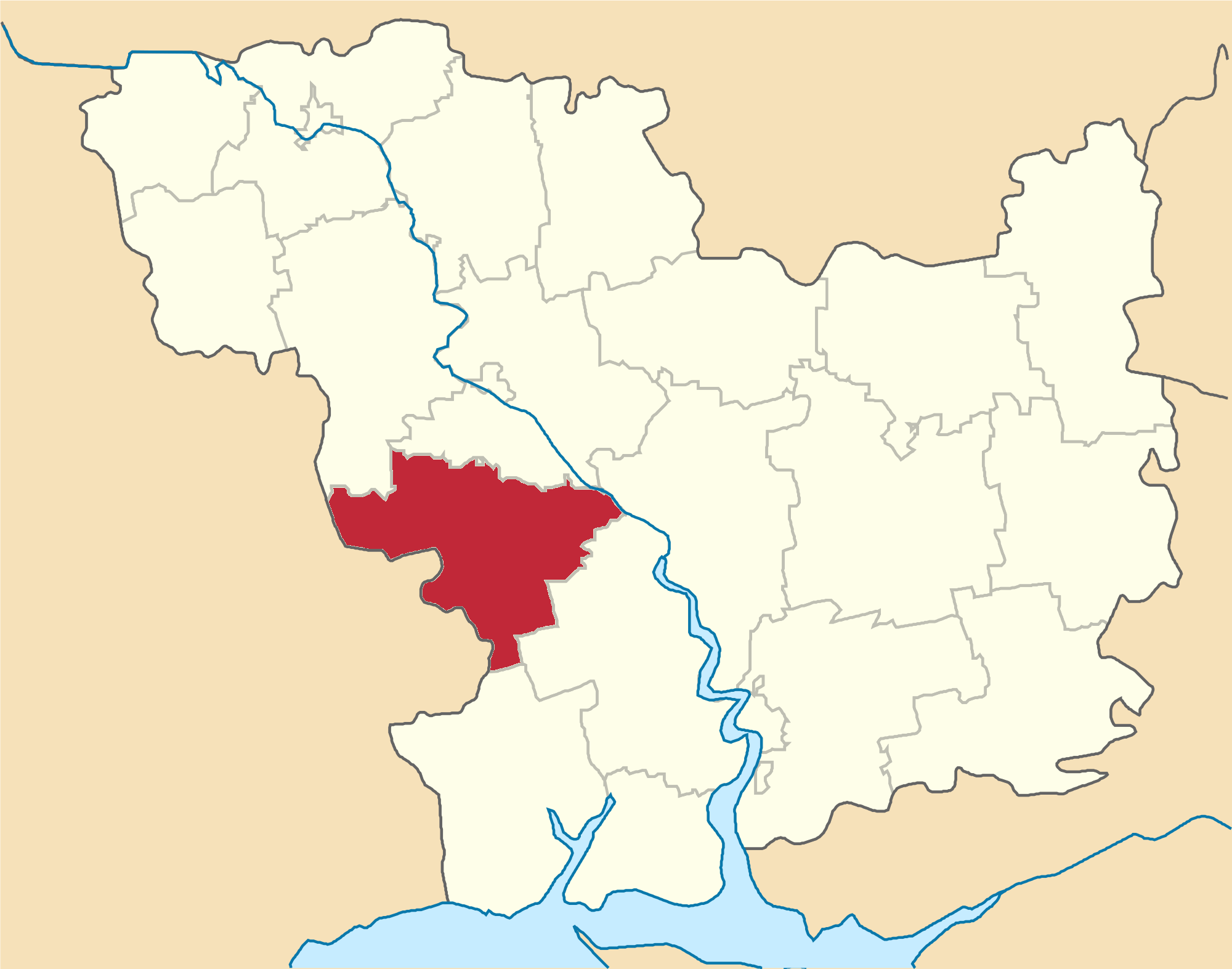
- Coordinates: 47°17′13″N 31°16′43″E
- Country: Ukraine
- Oblast: Mykolaiv Oblast
- Established: 1939
- Disestablished: 18 July 2020
- Admin. center: Veselynove
- Subdivisions: List: 0 — city councils; 2 — settlement councils; 12 — rural councils; Number of localities: 0 — cities; 2 — urban-type settlements; 50 — villages; 2 — rural settlements

Government
  - Governor: Oleksandr Koval

Area
  - Total: 1,200 km^{2} (460 sq mi)

Population (2020)
  - Total: 22,091 ▼
  - Density: 18/km^{2} (48/sq mi)
- Time zone: UTC+02:00 (EET)
  - Summer (DST): UTC+03:00 (EEST)
- Postal index: 57000—57070
- Area code: +380 5163

Veselynove Raion (Ukrainian: Веселинівський район) was a subdivision of Mykolaiv Oblast of Ukraine. Its administrative center was the urban-type settlement of Veselynove. The raion was abolished on 18 July 2020 as part of the administrative reform of Ukraine, which reduced the number of raions of Mykolaiv Oblast to four. The area of Veselynove Raion was merged into Voznesensk Raion. The last estimate of the raion population was 22,091 (2020 est.) In 2001, population was 27,046.

== History ==
The area was settled in the end of the 18th century. After 1834, the current area of the district belonged to Ananyevsky Uyezd of Kherson Governorate. On 16 April 1920, Odessa Governorate split off, and Ananyevsky Uyezd was moved to Odessa Governorate. In 1920, the area was moved to Voznesensky Uyezd. In 1923, uyezds in Ukrainian Soviet Socialist Republic were abolished, and the governorates were divided into okruhas. In 1930, okruhas were abolished, and on 27 February 1932, Odessa Oblast was established, and the area was included into Odessa Oblast.

Veselynove Raion with the administrative center in the selo of Veselynove was established in 1939 and belonged to Odessa Oblast. In 1944, Veselynove Raion was transferred to Mykolaiv Oblast. In 1960, Veselynove was granted urban-type settlement status. In 1963, during the abortive Khrushchyov administrative reform, the raion was abolished. In 1965, it was re-established.

At the time of disestablishment, the raion consisted of one hromada, Veselynove settlement hromada with the administration in Veselynove.

== Localities ==
- Hradivka
