= Chychyklia =

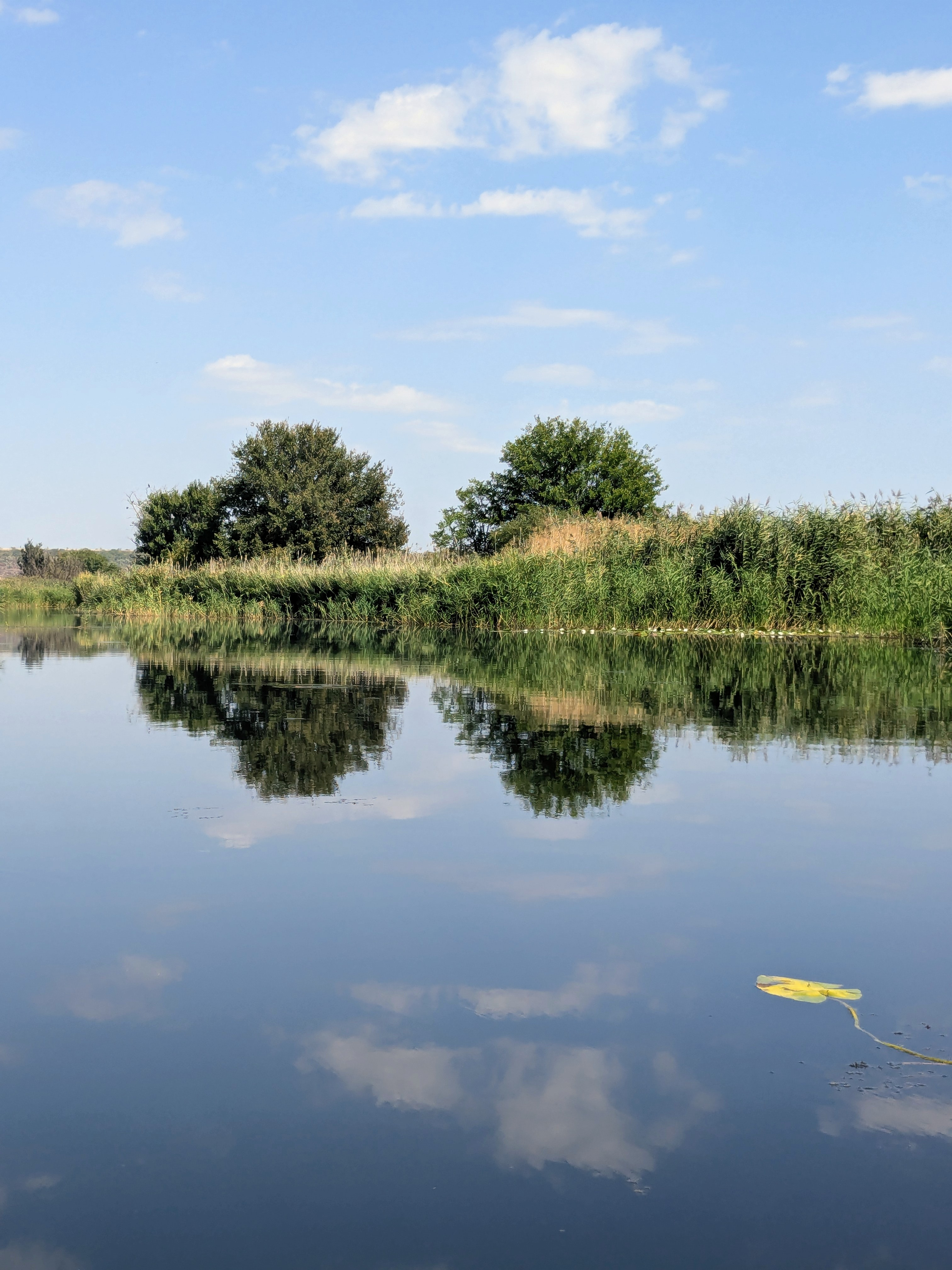
- Chychyklia in Mykolaiv Oblast

Location
- Country: Ukraine

Physical characteristics
- Source
  - location: Liubashivka, Odesa Oblast
  - coordinates: 47°51′07″N 30°09′07″E
- Mouth: Southern Bug
  - coordinates: 47.3765°N 31.568°E
- Length: 156 km (97 mi)
- Basin size: 2,120 km^{2} (820 sq mi)

Basin features
- Progression: Southern Bug→ Dnieper–Bug estuary→ Black Sea

The Chychyklia (Ukrainian: Чичиклія) is a river in Ukraine and a right tributary of the Southern Bug that flows through Odesa Oblast and Mykolaiv Oblast at the border between the Podolian Upland and Black Sea Lowland within the Ukrainian steppe. The river often dries away for up to six months.

It is 156 kilometres (97 mi) long and its basin area is 2,120 square kilometres (819 sq mi).

In the 18th century, a star fortress, Zickzaley, was located at the river mouth. Not far from Zickzaley was also located Andrew's redout (redoubt).

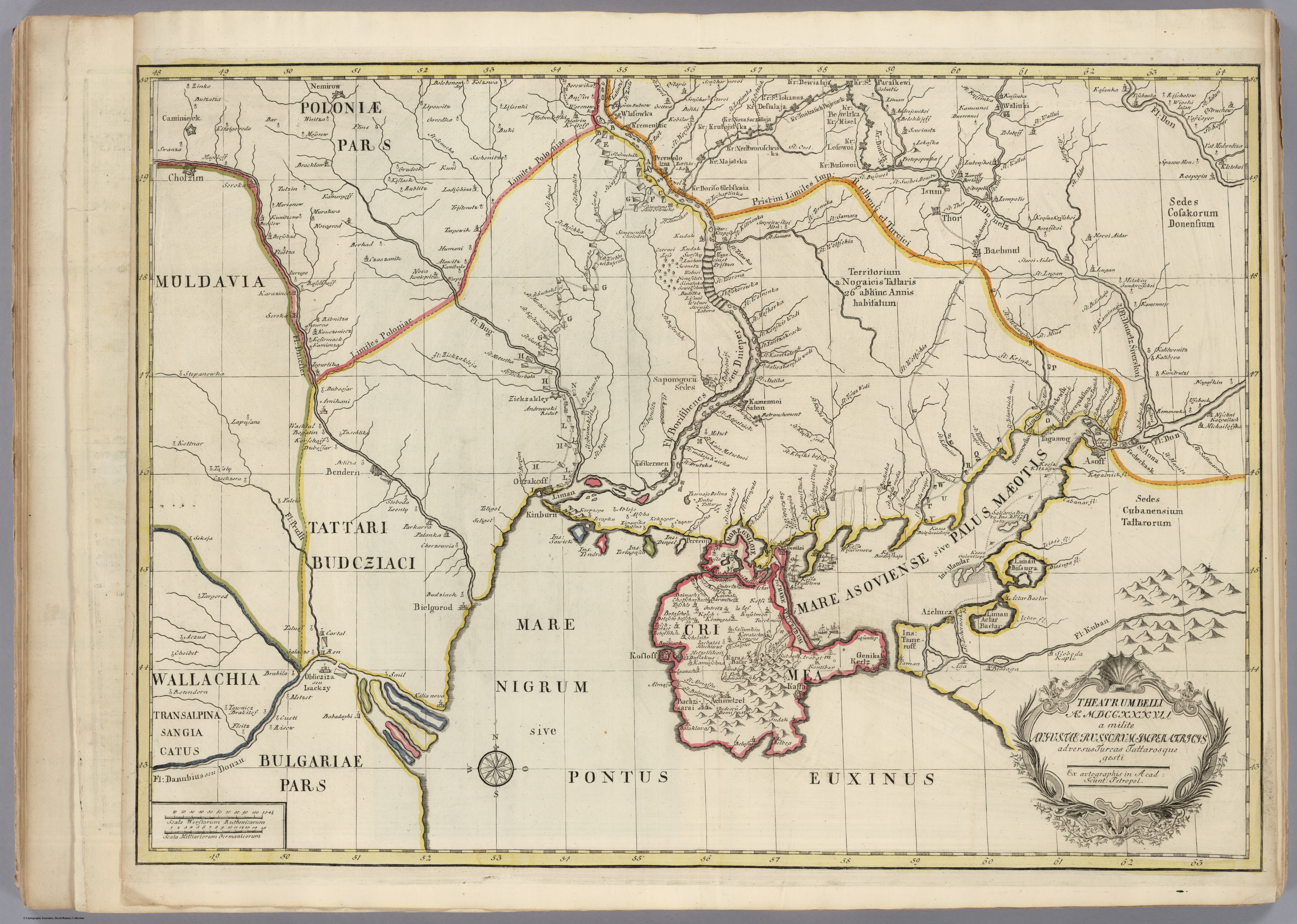
The 18th-century map where the river is named as Zickzakleja
