= Voznesensk Raion =

Subdivision of Mykolaiv Oblast, Ukraine

Voznesensk Raion Вознесенський район
- Raion
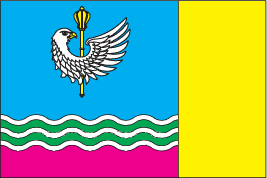
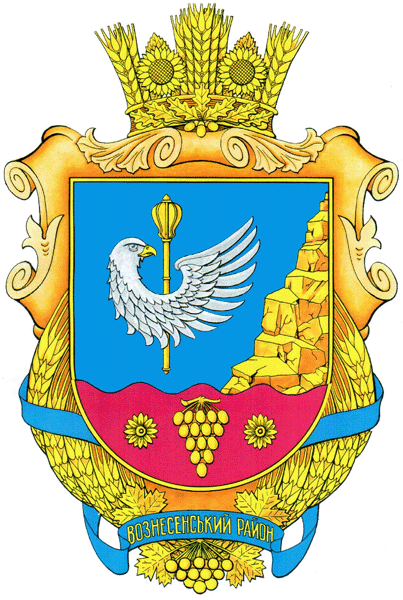
- Flag Coat of arms

- Coordinates: 47°33′35″N 31°26′21″E
- Country: Ukraine
- Oblast: Mykolaiv Oblast
- Established: 1923
- Admin. center: Voznesensk
- Subdivisions: 13 hromadas

Government
  - Governor: Oleksandr Kucher

Area
  - Total: 6,152 km^{2} (2,375 sq mi)

Population (2022)
  - Total: 175,542
  - Density: 28.53/km^{2} (73.90/sq mi)
- Time zone: UTC+02:00 (EET)
  - Summer (DST): UTC+03:00 (EEST)
- Postal index: 56519—56576
- Area code: +380 5134
- Website: https://voznesensk.mk.gov.ua

Voznesensk Raion (Ukrainian: Вознесенський район) is a raion (district) in Mykolaiv Oblast, Ukraine. Its administrative center is the town of Voznesensk. Population: 175,542 (2022 estimate).

== History ==
In 1923, uezds in Ukrainian Soviet Socialist Republic were abolished, and the governorates were divided into okruhas. In 1923, Voznesensk Raion with the administrative center located in Voznesensk was established. It belonged to Mykolaiv Okruha of Odessa Governorate. In 1925, the governorates were abolished, and okruhas were directly subordinated to Ukrainian SSR. In 1930, okruhas were abolished, and on 27 February 1932, Odessa Oblast was established, and Voznesensk Raion was included into Odessa Oblast. In 1944, Voznesensk Raion was transferred to Mykolaiv Oblast. In 1975, Voznesensk became the city of oblast significance.

On 18 July 2020, as part of the administrative reform of Ukraine, the number of raions of Mykolaiv Oblast was reduced to four, and the area of Voznesensk Raion was significantly expanded. Four abolished raions, Bratske, Domanivka, Veselynove, and Yelanets Raions, as well as the cities of Voznesensk and Pivdennoukrainsk, which were previously incorporated as a city of oblast significance and did not belong to any raion, were merged into Voznesensk Raion. The January 2020 estimate of the raion population was 29,241 (2020 est.)

== Subdivisions ==
=== Current ===
After the reform in July 2020, the raion consisted of 13 hromadas:

- Bratske settlement hromada with the administration in the rural settlement of Bratske, transferred from Bratske Raion;
- Domanivka settlement hromada with the administration in the rural settlement of Domanivka, transferred from Domanivka Raion;
- Buzke rural hromada with the administration in the selo of Buzke, retained from Voznesensk Raion;
- Doroshivka rural hromada with the administration in the selo of Doroshivka, retained from Voznesensk Raion;
- Mostove rural hromada with the administration in the selo of Mostove, transferred from Domanivka Raion;
- Novomarivka rural hromada with the administration in the selo of Novomarivka, transferred from Bratske Raion;
- Oleksandrivka settlement hromada with the administration in the rural settlement of Oleksandrivka, retained from Voznesensk Raion;
- Prybuzhany rural hromada with the administration in the selo of Prybuzhany, retained from Voznesensk Raion;
- Prybuzhzhia rural hromada with the administration in the selo of Prybuzhzhia, transferred from Domanivka Raion;
- Veselynove settlement hromada with the administration in the rural settlement of Veselynove, transferred from Veselynove Raion;
- Voznesensk urban hromada with the administration in the city of Voznesensk, transferred from the city of oblast significance of Voznesensk;
- Yelanets settlement hromada with the administration in the rural settlement of Yelanets, transferred from Yelanets Raion;
- Yuzhnoukrainsk urban hromada with the administration in the city of Pivdennoukrainsk, transferred from the city of oblast significance of Yuzhnoukrainsk.

=== Before 2020 ===
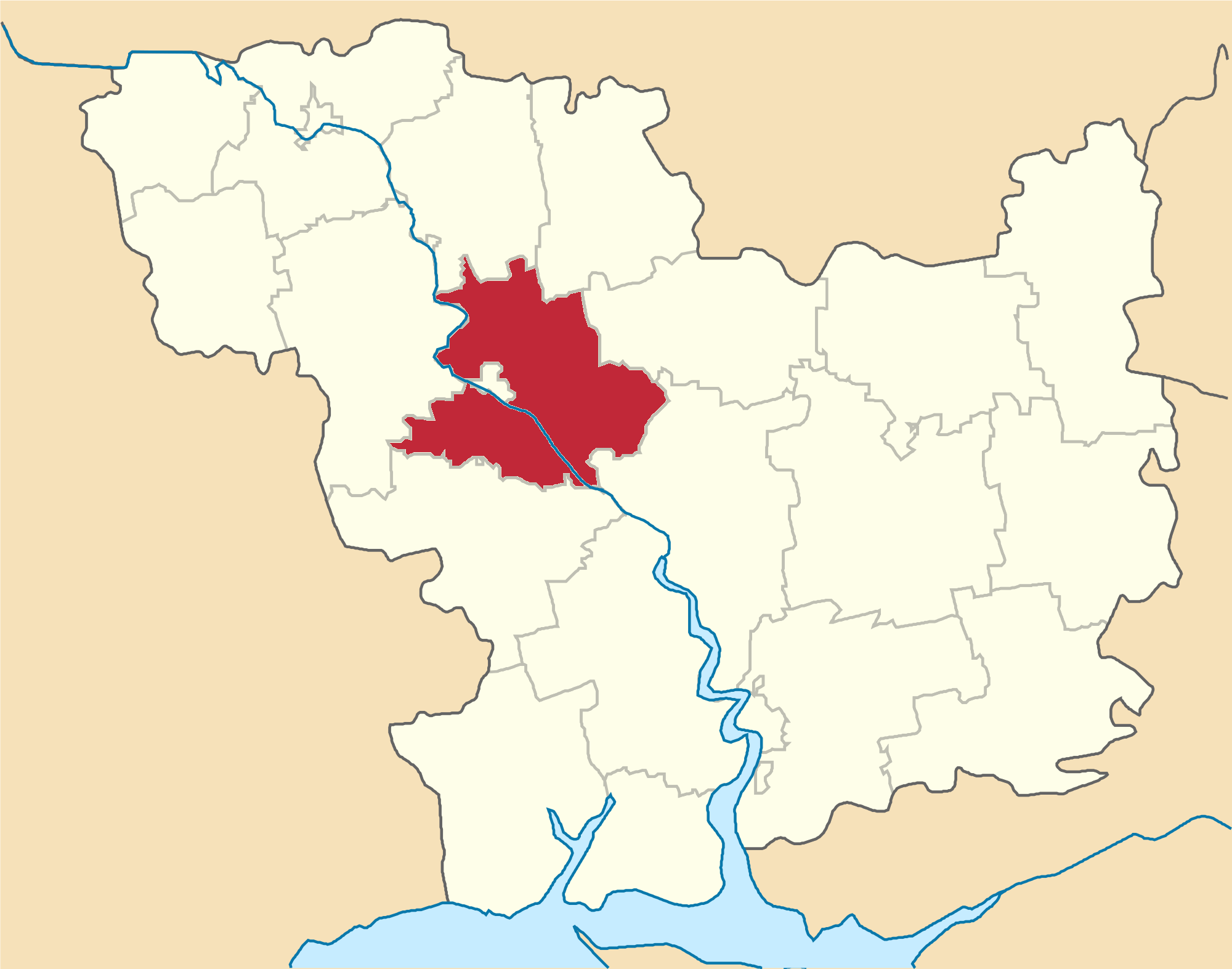
Voznesensk Raion in Mykolaiv Oblast before 2020

Before the 2020 reform, the raion consisted of four hromadas,

- Buzke rural hromada with the administration in Buzke;
- Doroshivka rural hromada with the administration in Doroshivka;
- Oleksandrivka settlement hromada with the administration in Oleksandrivka;
- Prybuzhany rural hromada with the administration in Prybuzhany.
